= Select Committee on the Criminal Law in England =

United Kingdom House of Commons select committee

- Formation: March 16, 1824
- Founder: Dr Lushington MP
- Dissolved: May 7, 1824
- Purpose: To consider consolidating and amending England's criminal law
- Key people: See § membership
- Parent organization: House of Commons
- Website: Report

The Select Committee on the Criminal Law in England was a select committee of the House of Commons of the Parliament of the United Kingdom appointed to consider consolidating and amending the criminal law of England and Wales.

== Background ==
In the United Kingdom, acts of Parliament remain in force until expressly repealed. Blackstone's Commentaries on the Laws of England, published in the late 18th century, raised questions about the system and structure of the common law and the poor drafting and disorder of the existing statute book.

In 1806, the Commission on Public Records passed a resolution requesting the production of a report on the best mode of reducing the volume of the statute book. From 1810 to 1825, The Statutes of the Realm was published, providing for the first time the authoritative collection of acts. In 1816, both Houses of Parliament, passed resolutions that an eminent lawyer with 20 clerks be commissioned to make a digest of the statutes, which was declared "very expedient to be done." However, this was never done.

== Establishment ==
On 16 March 1824, Dr Stephen Lushington MP proposed a motion in the House of Commons to appoint a select committee to consider consolidating and amending England's criminal law. The primary motivation for that criminal statutes had accumulated since Magna Carta without systematic organization, these laws were scattered and in "the greatest possible confusion", and had contributed to considerable increase in the bulk of the statute book. Dr Lushington proposed approach was to:

- Group existing criminal statutes under specific categories (e.g., all forgery laws together, all larceny laws together).
- Initially focus only on consolidation without changing the substance of laws or their punishments.
- Address any law reforms or alterations in a later stage, likely in the next session.
- Ensure any future changes would be clearly presented to Parliament.

The Motion was seconded by John Smith MP and was approved, without objection.

=== Membership ===
The committee was appointed on 16 March 1824, consisting of 27 members with a quorum of five and the power to "send for persons and paper":

Name	Party	Commentary
Dr Stephen Lushington	Whig	Proposed the committee.
Robert Peel	Tory	Home Secretary
John Singleton Copley	Tory	Attorney General
Sir Charles Wetherell	Tory	Solicitor General
Edward Littleton	Tory	–
John Hensleigh Allen	Whig	–
Sir Edward Knatchbull, 9th Baronet	Tory	–
Sir George Chetwynd, 2nd Baronet	None	–
Thomas Spring Rice	Whig	
Sir John Newport	Whig	–
Thomas Courtenay	Tory	–
Sir James Mackintosh	Whig	–
John Smith	Tory	Seconded the committee.
George Lamb	Whig	–
George Abercromby, 3rd Baron Abercromby	Whig	–
Thomas Fowell Buxton (Note: The Journals of the House of Commons incorrectly reads "Powell Buxton".)	Whig	–
Charles Western	Whig	–
Thomas Barrett-Lennard	Whig	–
Sir Edward Hyde East	Whig	–
William Manning	Tory	–
George Robert Dawson	Tory	–
John Hearle Tremayne	Tory	–
Robert Percy Smith	Tory	–
Edmond Wodehouse	Tory	Added on 18 March 1824.
Davies Gilbert	Tory	Added on 18 March 1824.
Charles Rumbold	Whig	Added on 18 March 1824.
George Gipps	Tory	Added on 18 March 1824.

== Report ==
The committee had its first meeting on 7 March 1824. The committee reported on 2 April 1824, using the illustrative example of a Forgery Bill and resolving to consolidate the criminal law under several heads and to bring in bills to do so:

Resolved, That it is the opinion of this Committee, That it is expedient that the statutes relating to the Criminal Law, should be consolidated under their several heads.

Resolved, That the chairman be directed to move for leave to bring in Bills pursuant to the above Resolution for consolidating the Criminal Law, without any amendments or alterations. Resolved, That it is the opinion of this Committee, That it is expedient that certain omissions and anomalies in the present state of the Criminal Law, be brought under the consideration of the House, with a view to remedy the same by legislative provisions.

Resolved, That the chairman be directed to move for leave to bring in Bills supplying such omissions, and remedying such anomalies; but that the same be in Bills to be wholly distinct from the consolidating Bills.

The committee further reported on 7 May 1824.

== Legacy ==
In 1822, Sir Robert Peel entered the cabinet as Home Secretary and in 1826 introduced a number of reforms to the English criminal law, which became known as Peel's Acts. This included efforts to modernise, consolidate and repeal provisions from a large number of earlier statutes, including:

- Benefit of clergy
- Larceny and other Offences of Stealing
- Burglary, Robbery and Threats for the Purpose of Robbery or of Extortion
- Embezzlement, False Pretences, and the Receipt of Stolen Property
- Malicious Injuries to Property
- Remedies against the Hundred

In 1827, Peel's Acts were passed to modernise, consolidate and repeal provisions of the criminal law, territorially limited to England and Wales and Scotland, including:

- Criminal Statutes Repeal Act 1827 (7 & 8 Geo. 4. c. 27), which repealed for England and Wales over 140 enactments relating to the criminal law.
- Criminal Law Act 1827 (7 & 8 Geo. 4. c. 28), which modernised the administration of criminal justice.
- Larceny Act 1827 (7 & 8 Geo. 4. c. 29), which consolidated provisions in the law relating to larceny.
- Malicious Injuries to Property Act 1827 (7 & 8 Geo. 4. c. 30), which consolidated provisions in the law relating to malicious injuries to property.

In 1828, parallel bills for Ireland to Peel's Acts were introduced, becoming:

- Criminal Statutes (Ireland) Repeal Act 1828 (9 Geo. 4. 54), which repealed for Ireland over 140 enactments relating to the criminal law.
- Criminal Law (Ireland) Act 1828 (9 Geo. 4. 54), which modernised the administration of criminal justice.
- Larceny (Ireland) Act 1828 (9 Geo. 4. c. 55) which consolidated provisions in the law relating to larceny.
- Malicious Injuries to Property (Ireland) Act 1828 (9 Geo. 4. c. 56), which consolidated provisions in the law relating to malicious injuries to property.

In 1828, the Offences Against the Person Act 1828 (9 Geo. 4. c. 31) was passed, which consolidated provisions in the law relating to offences against the person and repealed for England and Wales almost 60 related statutes. In 1829, the Offences Against the Person (Ireland) Act 1829 (10 Geo. 4. c. 34) was passed, which consolidated provisions in the law relating to offences against the person and repealed for Ireland almost 60 enactments relating to the Criminal law.

In 1861, bills were introduced, drafted by Charles Sprengel Greaves to mirror Peel's Acts, to consolidate and modernise the criminal law across:

- Offences Against the Person
- Malicious Injuries to Property
- Larceny
- Forgery
- Coining
- Accessories and Abettors

In 1861, the Criminal Consolidation Acts were passed for that purpose:

- Accessories and Abettors Act 1861 (24 & 25 Vict. c. 94), which modernised provisions in the law relating to Aiding and abetting.
- Criminal Statutes Repeal Act 1861 (24 & 25 Vict. c. 95), which repealed for England and Wales and Ireland over 100 enactments relating to the criminal law.
- Larceny Act 1861 (24 & 25 Vict. c. 96), which modernised provisions in the law relating to larceny.
- Malicious Damage Act 1861 (24 & 25 Vict. c. 97), which modernised provisions in the law relating to malicious injury to property.
- Forgery Act 1861 (24 & 25 Vict. c. 98), which modernised provisions in the law relating to forgery.
- Coinage Offences Act 1861 (24 & 25 Vict. c. 99), which modernised provisions in the law relating to coinage.
- Offences Against the Person Act 1861 (24 & 25 Vict. c. 100), which modernised provisions in the law relating to offences against the person.

In 1830, the Forgery Act 1830 (11 Geo. 4 & 1 Will. 4. c. 66) was passed, which consolidated provisions in the law relating to forgery and repealed for England and Wales over 25 enactments relating to the criminal law.

In 1832, the Coinage Offences Act 1832 (2 & 3 Will. 4. c. 34) was passed, which consolidated provisions in the law relating to the counterfeiting and clipping of coins, repealed for the United Kingdom almost 50 enactments relating to the criminal law, and abolished the punishment of the death penalty for coinage offences.

== See also ==
- Statute Law Revision Act
- Peel's Acts
