= Offences Against the Person Act 1837 =

Act of the Parliament of the United Kingdom

- Act of Parliament
- Parliament of the United Kingdom
- Long title: An Act to amend the Laws relating to Offences against the Person.
- Citation: 7 Will. 4 & 1 Vict. c. 85
- Introduced by: Arthur Hill-Trevor, 3rd Viscount Dungannon MP (Abandoned); Lord John Russell MP; (Commons); Thomas Aitchison-Denman, 2nd Baron Denman (Lords)
- Territorial extent: United Kingdom, except Scotland (Note: Section 12.)

Dates
- Royal assent: 17 July 1837
- Commencement: 1 October 1837 (Note: Section 13.)
- Repealed: 1 November 1861
Other legislation
| Amends | Offences Against the Person Act 1828; Offences Against the Person (Ireland) Act 1829 |
| Amended by | Criminal Procedure Act 1851; Statute Law Revision Act 1861 |
| Repealed by | Criminal Statutes Repeal Act 1861 |
| Relates to | Criminal Law Act 1827; Criminal Statutes Repeal Act 1827; Larceny Act 1827; Malicious Injuries to Property Act 1827; Remedies against the Hundred Act 1827; Offences Against the Person Act 1828; Criminal Statutes (Ireland) Repeal Act 1828; Criminal Law (India) Act 1828; Offences Against the Person (Ireland) Act 1829; Coinage Offences Act 1832; Forgery Act 1830; Forgery Act 1837; Punishment of Offences Act 1837; Accessories and Abettors Act 1861; Criminal Statutes Repeal Act 1861; Larceny Act 1861; Malicious Damage Act 1861; Forgery Act 1861; Coinage Offences Act 1861; Offences Against the Person Act 1861 |

Status: Repealed

History of passage through Parliament

Records of Parliamentary debate relating to the statute from Hansard

Text of statute as originally enacted

The Offences Against the Person Act 1837 (7 Will. 4 & 1 Vict. c. 85) was an act of the Parliament of the United Kingdom that amended the law to lessen the severity of punishment of offences against the person, lessening the severity of the punishment of offences.

The act was one of the Acts for the Mitigation of the Criminal Law (7 Will. 4 & 1 Vict. cc. 84–91), which reduced the severity of punishments in the criminal justice system and abolished the death penalty for several offences.

== Background ==
In the United Kingdom, acts of Parliament remain in force until expressly repealed. Blackstone's Commentaries on the Laws of England, published in the late 18th-century, raised questions about the system and structure of the common law and the poor drafting and disorder of the existing statute book.

In 1806, the Commission on Public Records passed a resolution requesting the production of a report on the best mode of reducing the volume of the statute book. From 1810 to 1825, The Statutes of the Realm was published, providing for the first time the authoritative collection of acts. In 1816, both Houses of Parliament, passed resolutions that an eminent lawyer with 20 clerks be commissioned to make a digest of the statutes, which was declared "very expedient to be done." However, this was never done.

In 1812, William Booth was the last person to be hanged for forgery in England. A public outcry at the harshness of his sentence resulted in the death penalty in England and Wales being reserved for capital crimes, making Booth the last person in England hanged for a non-capital crime.

In 1822, Sir Robert Peel entered the cabinet as home secretary and in 1826 introduced a number of reforms to the English criminal law, which became known as Peel's Acts. This included efforts to modernise, consolidate and repeal provisions from a large number of earlier statutes, including:

- Benefit of Clergy
- Larceny and other Offences of Stealing
- Burglary, Robbery and Threats for the Purpose of Robbery or of Extortion
- Embezzlement, False Pretences, and the Receipt of Stolen Property
- Malicious Injuries to Property
- Remedies against the Hundred

In 1827, several acts were passed for this purpose, territorially limited to England and Wales and Scotland, including:

- Criminal Statutes Repeal Act 1827 (7 & 8 Geo. 4. c. 27), which repealed for England and Wales over 140 enactments relating to the criminal law.
- Criminal Law Act 1827 (7 & 8 Geo. 4. c. 28), which modernised the administration of criminal justice.
- Larceny Act 1827 (7 & 8 Geo. 4. c. 29), which consolidated provisions in the law relating to larceny.
- Malicious Injuries to Property Act 1827 (7 & 8 Geo. 4. c. 30), which consolidated provisions in the law relating to malicious injuries to property.

In 1828, parallel bills for Ireland to Peel's Acts were introduced, becoming:

- Criminal Statutes (Ireland) Repeal Act 1828 (9 Geo. 4. 54), which repealed for Ireland over 140 enactments relating to the criminal law.
- Criminal Law (Ireland) Act 1828 (9 Geo. 4. 54), which modernised the administration of criminal justice.
- Larceny (Ireland) Act 1828 (9 Geo. 4. c. 55) which consolidated provisions in the law relating to larceny.
- Malicious Injuries to Property (Ireland) Act 1828 (9 Geo. 4. c. 56), which consolidated provisions in the law relating to malicious injuries to property.

In 1828, the Offences Against the Person Act 1828 (9 Geo. 4. c. 31) was passed, which consolidated provisions in the law relating to offences against the person and repealed for England and Wales almost 60 enactments relating to the criminal law. In 1829, the Offences Against the Person (Ireland) Act 1829 (10 Geo. 4. c. 34) was passed, which consolidated provisions in the law relating to offences against the person and repealed for Ireland almost 60 enactments relating to the criminal law.

In 1828, the Criminal Law (India) Act 1828 (9 Geo. 4. c. 74) was passed, which repealed for India offences repealed by the Criminal Statutes Repeal Act 1827 (7 & 8 Geo. 4. c. 27) the Offences Against the Person Act 1828 (9 Geo. 4. c. 31).

In 1830, the Forgery Act 1830 (11 Geo. 4 & 1 Will. 4. c. 66) was passed, which consolidated provisions in the law relating to forgery and repealed for England and Wales over 25 enactments relating to the criminal law.

In 1832, the Coinage Offences Act 1832 (2 & 3 Will. 4. c. 34) was passed, which consolidated provisions in the law relating to the counterfeiting and clipping of coins, repealed for the United Kingdom almost 50 enactments relating to the criminal law, and abolished the punishment of the death penalty for coinage offences.

In 1832, the Forgery, Abolition of Punishment of Death Act 1832 (2 & 3 Will. 4. c. 123) was passed, which abolished the punishment of the death penalty for all offences of forgery, except for forging wills and certain powers of attorney.

In 1837, bills were introduced by the home secretary, Lord John Russell, to reduce the severity of punishments in the criminal justice system and abolish the death penalty for several offences:

- Forgery
- Offences against the person
- Burglary
- Robbery
- Piracy
- Arson
- Solitary confinement
- Death penalty

== Passage ==
Leave to bring in the Offences Against the Person Bill was granted to Arthur Hill-Trevor, 3rd Viscount Dungannon MP and Grove Price MP on 9 February 1837. The bill had its first reading in the House of Commons on 22 February 1837, introduced by Arthur Hill-Trevor, 3rd Viscount Dungannon MP. However, the Bill was withdrawn on 27 February 1837.

The bill had its first reading in the House of Commons on 10 April 1837, introduced by Lord John Russell MP as part of a wider package of acts to reduce the severity of punishment in the criminal justice system. The bill had its second reading in the House of Commons on 24 April 1837 and was committed to a committee of the whole house. During debate, Sir Robert Peel expressed concerns about the preparedness of the House to discuss the measures, and the effectiveness of secondary punishments including transpiration and imprisonment. The Committee which met on 20 May 1837 and reported on 28 June 1837, with amendments. The amended bill was considered on 27 June 1837, and was re-committed to a committee of the whole house, which met immediately. During debate, an amendment by Daniel O'Connell MP proposing giving judges discretion between death or transportation, was defeated. The Committee reported on 28 June 1837, with amendments. The amended bill had its third reading in the House of Commons on 29 July 1837, without amendments.

The bill had its first reading in the House of Lords on 29 June 1837. The bill had its second reading in the House of Lords on 4 July 1837 and was committed to a committee of the whole house, introduced by Thomas Aitchison-Denman, 2nd Baron Denman. The measures in the Bill to reduce capital punishment was supported by Henry Brougham, 1st Baron Brougham and Vaux, but the rushed timeline of the Bill was criticised. The Committee which met on 10 July 1837 and reported on 11 July 1837, with amendments. The amended bill had its third reading in the House of Lords on 11 July 1837, with amendments, and passed on 14 July 1837, with amendments.

The amended bill was considered and agreed to by the House of Commons on 17 July 1837, supported by Lord John Russell MP.

The bill was granted royal assent on 17 July 1837.

== Provisions ==
=== Section 1 ===
Section 1 of the act repealed parts of certain acts, effective 1 September 1837, including:

- Offences Against the Person Act 1828 (9 Geo. 4. c. 31)
- Offences Against the Person (Ireland) Act 1829 (10 Geo. 4. c. 34)

Section 1 of the act also provided that for offenses and other matters committed or done before or on the last day of September 1837, the repealed acts would still apply as if the act had not been passed.

=== Section 2 ===
Section 2 of the act provided that the punishment for administering poison or doing other bodily injury with intent to commit murder was the death penalty.

=== Section 3 ===
Section 3 of the act provided that the punishment for offences with intent to commit murder without bodily injury was transportation for life, or for a term not less than fifteen years, or imprisonment for a term not exceeding three years.

=== Section 4 ===
Section 4 of the act provided that the punishment for shooting, stabbing, cutting or wounding with intent was transportation for life, or for a term not less than fifteen years, or imprisonment for a term not exceeding three years. This abolished the death penalty for this offence, replacing replaced section 12 of the Offences Against the Person Act 1828 (9 Geo. 4. c. 31).

=== Section 5 ===
Section 5 of the act provided that the punishment for sending explosive substances or throwing destructive matter with intent to do bodily harm was transportation for life, or for a term not less than fifteen years, or imprisonment for a term not exceeding three years.

=== Section 6 ===
Section 6 of the act provided that the punishment for procuring abortion was transportation for life, or for a term not less than fifteen years, or imprisonment for a term not exceeding three years. Unlike the previous act, this provision made no distinction between pre- and post- quickening abortions. This abolished the death penalty for post-quickening abortions and replaced replaced section 13 of the Offences Against the Person Act 1828 (9 Geo. 4. c. 31)

=== Section 7 ===
Section 7 of the act provided that the punishment for accessories before the fact was death or the same as proscribed for principals in the act and for accessories before the fact was imprisonment for a term not exceeding two years.

=== Section 8 ===
Section 8 of the act provided that persons convicted of offences made punishable by imprisonment could be kept to hard labour and solitary confinement.

=== Section 9 ===
Section 4 of the act provided that the act did not affect the powers conferred by Prisons Act 1835 (5 & 6 Will. 4. c. 38) or Gaols Act 1823 (4 Geo. 4. c. 64).

=== Section 10 ===
Section 10 of the act provided that offences committed within the jurisdiction of the Admiralty of the England and Ireland would be dealt in the same manner as those committed within England and Ireland.

=== Section 11 ===
Section 11 of the act empowered the court to imprison offenders found guilty of assault for any term not exceeding three years.

=== Section 12 ===
Section 12 of the act provided that the act did not extend to Scotland.

=== Section 13 ===
Section 5 of the act provided that the act was to come into force on 1 October 1837.

== Legacy ==
=== Subsequent developments ===
The act was one of the Acts for the Mitigation of the Criminal Law (7 Will. 4 & 1 Vict. cc. 84–91), which reduced the severity of punishments in the criminal justice system and abolished the death penalty for several offences:

- Forgery Act 1837 (7 Will. 4 & 1 Vict. c. 84)
- Offences Against the Person Act 1837 (7 Will. 4 & 1 Vict. c. 85)
- Burglary Act 1837 (7 Will. 4 & 1 Vict. c. 86)
- Robbery from the Person Act 1837 (7 Will. 4 & 1 Vict. c. 87)
- Piracy Act 1837 (7 Will. 4 & 1 Vict. c. 88)
- Burning of Buildings, etc. Act 1837 (7 Will. 4 & 1 Vict. c. 89)
- Solitary Confinement Act 1837 (7 Will. 4 & 1 Vict. c. 90)
- Punishment of Offences Act 1837 (7 Will. 4 & 1 Vict. c. 91)

At the start of the parliamentary session in 1853, Lord Cranworth announced his intention to the improvement of the statute law and in March 1853, appointed the Board for the Revision of the Statute Law to repeal expired statutes and continue consolidation, with a wider remit that included civil law. The Board issued three reports, recommending the creation of a permanent body for statute law reform.

In 1854, Lord Cranworth appointed the Royal Commission for Consolidating the Statute Law to consolidate existing statutes and enactments of English law. The Commission made four reports. Recommendations made by the Commission were implemented by the Repeal of Obsolete Statutes Act 1856 (19 & 20 Vict. c. 64).

On 17 February 1860, the Attorney General, Sir Richard Bethell told the House of Commons that he had engaged Sir Francis Reilly and A. J. Wood to expurgate the statute book of all acts which, though not expressly repealed, were not in force, working backwards from the present time.

In 1861, bills were introduced to consolidate and modernise the criminal law, drafted by Charles Sprengel Greaves across:

- Offences Against the Person
- Malicious Injuries to Property
- Larceny
- Forgery
- Coining
- Accessories and Abettors

In 1861, the Criminal Law Consolidation Acts were passed:

- Accessories and Abettors Act 1861 (24 & 25 Vict. c. 94)
- Criminal Statutes Repeal Act 1861 (24 & 25 Vict. c. 95)
- Larceny Act 1861 (24 & 25 Vict. c. 96)
- Malicious Damage Act 1861 (24 & 25 Vict. c. 97)
- Forgery Act 1861 (24 & 25 Vict. c. 98)
- Coinage Offences Act 1861 (24 & 25 Vict. c. 99)
- Offences Against the Person Act 1861 (24 & 25 Vict. c. 100)

=== Repeal ===
The act was adopted in New South Wales by section 1 of the Act 2 Victoria No 10.

This act was repealed as to New Zealand by section 2 of, and Schedule A to, the Indictable Offences Acts Repeal Act 1867 (31 Vict No 8), and by section 3 of, and the First Part of the Schedule to, the Repeals Act 1878 (42 Vict. No 28).

It repealed a number of offences under the Offences against the Person Act 1828 (9 Geo. 4. c. 31), and under the corresponding Irish Act, the Offences Against the Person (Ireland) Act 1829 (10 Geo. 4. c. 34), and re-enacted those offences in different terms.

Section 11 of the act was repealed by section 10 of the Criminal Procedure Act 1851 (14 & 15 Vict. c. 100).

The whole act was replaced by the Offences against the Person Act 1861 (24 & 25 Vict. c. 100). The whole act was repealed by section 1 of, and the schedule to, the Criminal Statutes Repeal Act 1861 (24 & 25 Vict. c. 95), which came into force on 1 November 1861.

== See also ==
- Offences Against the Person Act
