= Criminal Law Act 1826 =

Act of the Parliament of the United Kingdom

Criminal Law Act 1826 (Note: The citation of this act by this short title was authorised by section 1 of, and the first schedule to, the Short Titles Act 1896. Due to the repeal of those provisions it is now authorised by section 19(2) of the Interpretation Act 1978.)
- Act of Parliament
- Parliament of the United Kingdom
- Long title: An Act for improving the Administration of Criminal Justice in England.
- Citation: 7 Geo. 4. c. 64
- Introduced by: Sir Robert Peel MP (Commons)
- Territorial extent: United Kingdom

Dates
- Royal assent: 26 May 1826
- Commencement: 26 May 1826 (Note: The Acts of Parliament (Commencement) Act 1793.)
Other legislation
Amends	See § Repealed enactments
Repeals/revokes	See § Repealed enactments
Amended by	Statute Law Revision Act 1848; Criminal Justice Administration Act 1851; Criminal Statutes Repeal Act 1861; Merchant Shipping (Expences) Act 1882; Statute Law Revision Act 1873; Merchant Shipping (Expences) Act 1882; Coroners Act 1887; Statute Law Revision Act 1890; Statute Law Revision (No. 2) Act 1890; Costs in Criminal Cases Act 1908; Indictments Act 1915; Statute Law Revision Act 1950; Magistrates' Courts Act 1952; Criminal Law Act 1967; Courts Act 1971; Local Government Act 1972; Criminal Justice Act 1988; Statute Law (Repeals) Act 1998; Serious Organised Crime and Police Act 2005
Relates to	Criminal Law Act 1827; Larceny Act 1827; Malicious Injuries to Property Act 1827; Remedies against the Hundred Act 1827; Offences Against the Person Act 1828; Criminal Statutes (Ireland) Repeal Act 1828; Offences Against the Person Act 1828; Criminal Law (India) Act 1828; Offences Against the Person (Ireland) Act 1829; Criminal Statutes Repeal Act 1861

Status: Amended

Text of statute as originally enacted

Revised text of statute as amended

Text of the Criminal Law Act 1826 as in force today (including any amendments) within the United Kingdom, from legislation.gov.uk.

The Criminal Law Act 1826 (7 Geo. 4. c. 64) is an act of the Parliament of the United Kingdom that consolidated a large number of acts relating to criminal procedure.

The act is often considered one of Peel's Acts, which consolidated, repealed and replaced a large number of existing statutes. The act formerly dealt with the preliminary examination and committal of accused persons by justices, the taking of depositions, the form of indictments, and the costs of prosecutions.

The act repealed for England and Wales enactments relating to the criminal law from 1275 to 1825. Similar provision was made for Ireland by the Criminal Statutes (Ireland) Repeal Act 1828 (9 Geo. 4. c. 53).

== Background ==
In the United Kingdom, acts of Parliament remain in force until expressly repealed. Blackstone's Commentaries on the Laws of England, published in the late 18th-century, raised questions about the system and structure of the common law and the poor drafting and disorder of the existing statute book.

In 1806, the Commission on Public Records passed a resolution requesting the production of a report on the best mode of reducing the volume of the statute book. From 1810 to 1825, The Statutes of the Realm was published, providing for the first time the authoritative collection of acts. In 1816, both Houses of Parliament, passed resolutions that an eminent lawyer with 20 clerks be commissioned to make a digest of the statutes, which was declared "very expedient to be done." However, this was never done.

On 16 March 1824, the Select Committee on the Criminal Law in England was appointed to consider the expediency of consolidating and amending the criminal law. The Select Committee reported on 2 April 1824, resolving to consolidate the criminal law under several heads and to bring in bills to do so.

In 1822, Sir Robert Peel entered the cabinet as home secretary and in 1826 introduced a number of reforms to the English criminal law, which became known as Peel's Acts. This included efforts to modernise, consolidate and repeal provisions from a large number of earlier statutes, including:

- Benefit of Clergy
- Larceny and other Offences of Stealing
- Burglary, Robbery and Threats for the Purpose of Robbery or of Extortion
- Embezzlement, False Pretences, and the Receipt of Stolen Property
- Malicious Injuries to Property
- Remedies against the Hundred

== Passage ==
Leave to bring in the Criminal Justice Bill to the House of Commons was granted on 9 March 1826 to the home secretary, Sir Robert Peel MP, the attorney general John Singleton Copley MP and the solicitor general Sir Charles Wetherell MP. The bill had its first reading in the House of Commons on 23 March 1826, introduced by the home secretary, Sir Robert Peel MP. The bill had its second reading in the House of Commons immediately and was committed to a committee of the whole house, which met and reported immediately, with amendments. The report was further considered by the House of Commons on 17 April 1826 and was re-committed to a Committee of the Whole House, which met and reported on 21 April 1826, with amendments. The amended bill was further considered and agreed to by the House of Commons and had its second reading in the House of Commons on 25 April 1826. The amended bill had its third reading in the House of Commons on 28 April 1826.

The amended bill had its first reading in the House of Lords on 2 May 1826. The bill had its second reading in the House of Lords on 5 May 1826 and was committed to a committee of the whole house, which met on 9 May 1826 and reported on 17 May 1826, with amendments. The amended bill was considered and agreed to by the House of Lords on 17 May 1826. The amended bill had its third reading in the House of Lords on 18 May 1826, with amendments.

The amended bill was considered and agreed to by the House of Commons on 19 May 1826.

The bill was granted royal assent on 26 May 1826.

== Provisions ==
The act formerly dealt with the preliminary examination and committal of accused persons by justices, the taking of depositions, the form of indictments, and the costs of prosecutions.

=== Preamble ===
The preamble of the act was repealed by the Statute Law Revision Act 1890.

=== Sections 1 to 27 ===
Sections 2 and 3 of the act were repealed by section 34 of the Indictable Offences Act 1848.

Section 4 of the act was repealed by section 45 of, and schedule 3 to, the Coroners Act 1887.

Sections 9 to 11 of the act were repealed by section 1 of, the schedule to, 24 & 25 Vict c 95 (1861).

Sections 12 and 13 of the act were repealed by section 56(4) of, and part IV of schedule 11 to, the Courts Act 1971.

Sections 14 to 16 of the act were repealed by section 9 of, and schedule 2 to, the Indictments Act 1915.

Sections 18 and 19 of the act were repealed by section 9 of, and schedule 2 to, the Indictments Act 1915.

Section 21 of the act was repealed by section 56(4) of, and part I of schedule 11 to, the Courts Act 1971.

Sections 22 to 25 of the act were repealed by section 10 of, and the schedule to, the Costs in Criminal Cases Act 1908.

Section 26 of the act was repealed by section 4 of the Criminal Justice Administration Act 1851.

Section 27 of the act was repealed by section 10 of, and the schedule to, the Merchant Shipping (Expences) Act 1882.

=== Section 28 ===
Courts may order compensation to those who have been active in the apprehension of certain offenders

Section 28 of the act originally read:

And, for the better Remuneration of Persons who have been active in the Apprehension of certain Offenders, be it enacted, That where any Person shall appear to any Court of Oyer and Terminer, Gaol Delivery, Superior Criminal Court of a County Palatine, or Court of Great Sessions, to have been active in or towards the Apprehension of any Person charged with Murder, or with feloniously and maliciously shooting at, or attempting to discharge any kind of loaded Fire Arms at any other Person, or with stabbing, cutting, or poisoning, or with administering any thing to procure the Miscarriage of any Woman, or with Rape, or with Burglary or felonious House-breaking, or with Robbery on the Person, or with Arson, or with Horse-stealing, Bullock-stealing, or Sheep-stealing, or with being accessory before the Fact to any of the Offences aforesaid, or with receiving any Stolen Property knowing the same to have been stolen, every such Court is hereby authorized and empowered, in any of the Cases aforesaid, to order the Sheriff of the County in which the Offence shall have been committed to pay to the Person or Persons, who shall appear to the Court to have been active in or towards the Apprehension of any Person charged with any of the said Offences, such Sum or Sums of Money as to the Court shall seem reasonable and sufficient to compensate such Person or Persons for his, her, or their Expences, Exertions, and Loss of Time in or towards such Apprehension; and where any Person shall appear to any Court of Sessions of the Peace, to have been active in or towards the Apprehension of any Party charged with receiving Stolen Property knowing the same to have been stolen, such Court shall have Power to order Compensation to such Person in the same Manner as the other Courts herein-before mentioned: Provided always, that nothing herein contained shall prevent any of the said Courts from also allowing to any such Persons, if Prosecutors or Witnesses, such Costs, Expences, and Compensation, as Courts are by this Act empowered to allow to Prosecutors and Witnesses respectively.

It now reads:

. . . where any person shall appear to [the Crown Court], to have been active in or towards the apprehension of any person charged with [an indictable offence], [the Crown Court] is hereby authorised and empowered, in any of the cases aforesaid, to order the sheriff of the county in which the offence shall have been committed to pay to the person or persons who shall appear to the court to have been active in or towards the apprehension of any person charged with [that offence] such sum or sums of money as to the court shall seem reasonable and sufficient to compensate such person or persons for his, her, or their expences, exertions, and loss of time in or towards such apprehension; . . . : . . .

The words of enactment at the start were repealed by the Statute Law Revision (No. 2) Act 1890.

The words "the Crown Court" were substituted by section 56(1) of, and paragraph 2 of Schedule 8 to, the Courts Act 1971. This was consequential on the creation of the Crown Court and the abolition of its predecessors by that act.

The words "an arrestable offence" (which are not printed in the amended text above because they have been replaced) and the words "that offence" were substituted by section 10(1) of, and paragraph 3(1) of Schedule 2 to, the Criminal Law Act 1967. This was consequential on the creation of the classification arrestable offence by that Act. The words "an indictable offence" were substituted for the words "an arrestable offence" by section 111 of, and paragraph 39 of Part 3 of Schedule 7 to, the Serious Organised Crime and Police Act 2005. This was consequential on the abolition of the classification arrestable offence by that act.

In section 21, the words " or information ", in both places, and the words " felony or ", and in section 28, the words from " and where any person " to " herein-before mentioned ", were repealed for England and Wales by section 10(2) of, and part III of schedule 3 to, the Criminal Law Act 1967, which came into force on 1 January 1968.

The words after "and where any Person shall appear to any Court of Sessions of the Peace, to have been active in or towards the Apprehension of any Party charged with receiving Stolen Property knowing the same to have been stolen, such Court shall have Power to order Compensation to such Person in the same Manner as the other Courts herein-before mentioned" were repealed by sections 10(1) and (2) of, and paragraph 3(1) of Schedule 2 to, and Part III of Schedule 3 to, the Criminal Law Act 1967.

The proviso to this section was repealed by the Statute Law (Repeals) Act 1998.

"Sheriff"

Sheriffs appointed for a county or Greater London are now known as high sheriffs, and any reference in any enactment or instrument to a sheriff must be construed accordingly in relation to sheriffs for a county or Greater London.

The following cases are relevant to this section:

- R v Barnes (1835) 7 C & P 166
- R v Jones (1835) 7 C & P 167
- R v Womersly (1836) 2 Lew CC 162
- R v Haines (1850) 5 Cox CC 114
- R v Dunning (1851) 17 LTOS 8, (1851) 5 Cox CC 142
- R v Platt and Sines (1905) 69 JP 424

=== Section 29 ===
Such orders to be paid by the Sheriff, who may obtain immediate repayment on application to the Treasury

. . . every order for payment to any person in respect of such apprehension as aforesaid shall be forthwith made out and delivered by the proper officer of the court unto such person . . . ; and the sheriff of the county for the time being is hereby authorised and required, upon sight of such order, forthwith to pay to such person, or to anyone duly authorised on his or her behalf, the money in such order mentioned; and every such sheriff may immediately apply for repayment of the same to the . . . [Lord Chancellor] who, upon inspecting such order, together with the acquittance of the person entitled to receive the money thereon, shall forthwith order repayment to the sheriff of the money so by him paid, without fee or reward whatsoever.

The words of enactment at the start were repealed by the Statute Law Revision (No. 2) Act 1888.

The words "upon being paid for the same the sum of 25p and no more" in the second place were repealed on 19 November 1998 by section 1(1) of, and Group 2 of Part 1 of Schedule 1 to the Statute Law (Repeals) Act 1998.

The words before "Lord Chancellor" were repealed by the Statute Law Revision Act 1890.

The words "Lord Chancellor" were substituted by article 4(a) of the Transfer of Functions (Treasury and Lord Chancellor) Order 1976 (S.I. 1976/229)

"Sheriff"

Sheriffs appointed for a county or Greater London are now known as high sheriffs, and any reference in any enactment or instrument to a sheriff must be construed accordingly in relation to sheriffs for a county or Greater London.

=== Sections 30 to 32 ===
Section 30 of the act was repealed by section 170 of, and paragraph 1 of schedule 15 to, and schedule 16 to, the Criminal Justice Act 1988.

Section 31 of the act was repealed by section 56(4) of, and part IV of schedule 11 to, the Courts Act 1971.

== Subsequent developments ==
In 1827, Peel's Acts were passed to modernise, consolidate and repeal provisions of the criminal law, territorially limited to England and Wales and Scotland, including:

- Criminal Statutes Repeal Act 1827 (7 & 8 Geo. 4. c. 27), which repealed for England and Wales over 140 enactments relating to the criminal law.
- Criminal Law Act 1827 (7 & 8 Geo. 4. c. 28), which modernised the administration of criminal justice.
- Larceny Act 1827 (7 & 8 Geo. 4. c. 29), which consolidated provisions in the law relating to larceny.
- Malicious Injuries to Property Act 1827 (7 & 8 Geo. 4. c. 30), which consolidated provisions in the law relating to malicious injuries to property.

In 1828, parallel bills for Ireland to Peel's Acts were introduced, becoming:

- Criminal Statutes (Ireland) Repeal Act 1828 (9 Geo. 4. 54), which repealed for Ireland over 140 enactments relating to the criminal law.
- Criminal Law (Ireland) Act 1828 (9 Geo. 4. 54), which modernised the administration of criminal justice.
- Larceny (Ireland) Act 1828 (9 Geo. 4. c. 55) which consolidated provisions in the law relating to larceny.
- Malicious Injuries to Property (Ireland) Act 1828 (9 Geo. 4. c. 56), which consolidated provisions in the law relating to malicious injuries to property.

In 1828, the Offences Against the Person Act 1828 (9 Geo. 4. c. 31) was passed, which consolidated provisions in the law relating to offences against the person and repealed for England and Wales almost 60 related enactments. In 1829, the Offences Against the Person (Ireland) Act 1829 (10 Geo. 4. c. 34) was passed, which consolidated provisions in the law relating to offences against the person and repealed for Ireland almost 60 enactments relating to the Criminal law.

In 1828, the Criminal Law (India) Act 1828 (9 Geo. 4. c. 74) was passed, which repealed for India offences repealed by the Criminal Statutes Repeal Act 1827 (7 & 8 Geo. 4. c. 27) the Offences Against the Person Act 1828 (9 Geo. 4. c. 31).

In 1861, bills were introduced, drafted by Charles Sprengel Greaves to mirror Peel's Acts, to consolidate and modernise the criminal law across:

- Offences Against the Person
- Malicious Injuries to Property
- Larceny
- Forgery
- Coining
- Accessories and Abettors

In 1861, the Criminal Consolidation Acts were passed for that purpose:

- Accessories and Abettors Act 1861 (24 & 25 Vict. c. 94), which modernised provisions in the law relating to Aiding and abetting.
- Criminal Statutes Repeal Act 1861 (24 & 25 Vict. c. 95), which repealed for England and Wales and Ireland over 100 enactments relating to the criminal law.
- Larceny Act 1861 (24 & 25 Vict. c. 96), which modernised provisions in the law relating to larceny.
- Malicious Damage Act 1861 (24 & 25 Vict. c. 97), which modernised provisions in the law relating to malicious injury to property.
- Forgery Act 1861 (24 & 25 Vict. c. 98), which modernised provisions in the law relating to forgery.
- Coinage Offences Act 1861 (24 & 25 Vict. c. 99), which modernised provisions in the law relating to coinage.
- Offences Against the Person Act 1861 (24 & 25 Vict. c. 100), which modernised provisions in the law relating to offences against the person.

Sections 7, 8, 20 and 32 of the act were repealed by section 1 of, and the schedule to, the Statute Law Revision Act 1873 (36 & 37 Vict. c. 91), which came into force on 5 August 1873.

Sections 1, 5, 6 and 17 of the act were repealed by section 1(1) of, and the first schedule to, the Statute Law Revision Act 1950 (14 Geo. 6. c. 6), which came into force on 23 May 1950.

== Repealed enactments ==
Section 32 of the act repealed 31 enactments for the United Kingdom excluding Scotland and Ireland (i.e., England and Wales) from 1275 to 1825, listed in that section. Section 32 of the act also provided that for offences and other matters committed or done before the passing of the act, the repealed acts would still apply as if the act had not been passed.

Citation	Short title	Title	Extent of repeal
3 Edw. 1. c. 15	Prisoners and Bail Act 1275	A Statute made at Westminster in the Third Year of the Reign of King Edward the First.	As provides what Prisoners shall not be replevisable and what shall be so.
7 Hen. 5.	Indictments, forgery	A Statute made in the Seventh Year of the Reign of King Henry the Fifth.	The whole act.
9 Hen. 5. c. 1	Indictments, etc.	A Statute made in the Ninth Year of the same Reign.	As relates to Indictments and Appeals laid in a non-existing Place.
18 Hen. 6. c. 12	Indictments, etc.	A Statute made in the Eighteenth Year of the Reign of King Henry the Sixth.	As perpetuates the said Provision of the Statute last referred to.
23 Hen. 6. c. 9	Sheriffs and Bailiffs, Fees, etc. Act 1444	A Statute made in the Twenty-third Year of the same Reign.	As relates to Sheriffs and other Officers and Ministers therein mentioned letting out of Prison Upon Sureties any Person in Custody upon Indictment. I.e., section 3.
1 Ric. 3. c. 3	Felony Act 1483	An Act passed in the First Year of the Reign of King Richard the Third, intituled An Act for bailing of Persons suspected of Felony.	The whole act.
3 Hen. 7. c. 3	Taking of Bail by Justices Act 1487	An Act passed in the Third Year of the Reign of King Henry the Seventh, intituled An Act that Justice of the Peace may take Bail.	As relates to Bail or Mainprize. I.e., section 2,
25 Hen. 8. c. 3	Standing Mute, etc. Act 1533	An Act passed in the Twenty-fifth Year of the Reign of King Henry the Eighth, intituled An Act for standing mute, and peremptory Challenge.	The whole act.
32 Hen. 8. c. 3	Perpetuation of Laws Act 1540	An Act passed in the Thirty-second Year of the same Reign, intituled For the Continuation of Acts.	As perpetuates the said last-mentioned Act
2 & 3 Edw. 6. c. 24	Criminal Law Act 1548	An Act passed in the Second and Third Years of the Reign of King Edward the Sixth, intituled An Act for the Trial of Murders and Felonies in several Counties.	The whole act.
5 & 6 Edw. 6. c. 10	Robbery (No. 2) Act 1551	An Act passed in the Fifth and Sixth Years of the same Reign, intituled An Act to take away the Benefit of Clergy from such as rob in one Shire and fly into another	The whole act.
1 & 2 Ph. & M. c. 13	Criminal Law Act 1554	An Act passed in the First and Second Years of the Reign of King Philip and Queen Mary, intituled An Act appointing an Order to Justices of Peace for the Bailment of Prisoners.	The whole act.
2 & 3 Ph. & M. c. 10	Criminal Law Act 1555	An Act passed in the Second and Third Years of the same Reign, intituled An Act to take Examination of Prisoners suspected of Manslaughter or Felony.	The whole
4 Will. & Mar. c. 8	Apprehension of Highwaymen Act 1692	An Act passed in the Fourth Year of the Reign of King William and Queen Mary, intituled An Act for encouraging the apprehending of Highwaymen.	The whole
10 & 11 Will. 3. c. 23	Clerks of Assize (Fees) Act 1698	An Act passed in the Tenth and Eleventh Years of the Reign of King William, intituled An Act for the better apprehending, prosecuting, and punishing of Felons that commit Burglary, Housebreaking, or Robbery in Shops, Warehouses, Coach-houses, or Stables, or that steal Horses.	As relates to the Certificates therein mentioned. I.e., sections 2, 3 and 4.
1 Ann. st. 2. c. 9	Witnesses on Trial for Treason, etc. Act 1702	An Act passed in the First Year of the Reign of Queen Anne, intituled An Act for punishing of Accessories to Felonies and Receivers of Stolen Goods; and to prevent the wilful burning and destroying of Ships.	As relates to Accessories. I.e., section 1
6 Ann. c. 31 (Note: Vulgo.)	Apprehension of Housebreakers Act 1706	An Act passed in the Sixth Year of the same Reign, intituled An Act for the encouraging the Discovery and apprehending of House breakers.	Except the special Provision affecting the Sheriffs and Under Sheriffs of London and Middlesex.
6 Geo. 1. c. 23	Robbery, etc. Act 1719	An Act passed in, the Sixth Year of the Reign of King George the First, intituled An Act for the further preventing Robbery, Burglary, and other Felonies; and for the more effectual Transportation of Felons.	The whole act.
25 Geo. 2. c. 36	Disorderly Houses Act 1751	An Act passed in the Twenty-fifth Year of the Reign of King George the Second, intituled An Act for the better preventing Thefts and Robberies; and for regulating Places of public Entertainment, and punishing Persons keeping disorderly Houses.	As relates to Payments to Prosecutors in Cases of Felony. I.e., section 3.
27 Geo. 2. c. 3	Offenders (Conveyance) Act 1754	An Act passed in the Twenty-seventh Year of the same Reign, intituled An Act for the better securing to Constables and others the Expences of conveying Offenders to Gaol, and for allowing the Charges of poor Persons bound to give Evidence against Felons.	As relates to the Allowance of Compensation to poor Persons appearing on Recognizance to give Evidence against any one accused of Felony. I.e., section 3.
18 Geo. 3. c. 19	Payment of Charges of Constables Act 1778	An Act passed in the Eighteenth Year of the Reign of King George the Third, intituled An Act for the Payment of Costs to Parties on Complaints determined before Justices of the Peace out of Sessions; for the Payment of the Charges of Constables in certain Cases; and for the more effectual Payment of Charges to Witnesses and Prosecutors of any Larceny or other Felony.	As relates to Payments and Allowances to Prosecutors and other Persons appearing on Recognizance or Subpoena to give Evidence as to any Felony, and to Rules and Regulations touching the Costs and Charges to be allowed to such Prosecutors and Persons. I.e., sections 7 and 8.
43 Geo. 3. c. 59	Bridges Act 1803	An Act passed in the Forty-third Year of the same Reign, intituled An Act for remedying certain Defects in the Laws relative to the building and repairing of County, Bridges and other Works maintained at the Expence of the Inhabitants of Counties in England.	As relates to laying the Property in; the Surveyor of County Bridges in any Indictment. I.e., section 3.
43 Geo. 3. c. 113	Casting Away of Vessels, etc. Act 1803	An Act passed in the same Year, for providing, among other Things, for the more convenient Trial of Accessories in Felonies.	As relates to the Trial of Accessories, except the special Provisions, therein contained as to Accessories before the Fact in Murder. I.e., section 5
56 Geo. 3. c. 73	Stealing Property from Mines Act 1816	An Act passed in the Fifty-sixth Year of the same Reign, intituled An Act for removing Difficulties in the Conviction of Offenders stealing Property from Mines.	The whole act.
58 Geo. 3. c. 70	Disorderly Houses Act 1818	An Act passed in the Fifty-eighth Year of the same Reign, intituled An Act for repealing such Parts of, several Acts as allow pecuniary and other Rewards upon the Conviction of Persons for Highway Robbery and other Crimes and Offences; and for facilitating the Means of prosecuting Persons accused of Felony and other Offences.	Except so much thereof as relates to disorderly Houses.
59 Geo. 3. c. 27	Felony Act 1819	An Act passed in the Fifty-ninth Year of the same Reign, intituled An Act to facilitate the Trial of Felonies committed on board. Vessels employed on Canals, Navigable Rivers, and Inland Navigations.	The whole act.
59 Geo. 3. c. 96	Felonies on Stage Coaches Act 1819	An Act passed in the same Year, intituled An Act to facilitate the Trials of Felonies committed on Stage Coaches and Stage Waggons and other such Carriages, and of Felonies committed on the Boundaries of Counties	The whole act.
1 Geo. 4. c. 102	Indictments Act 1820	An Act passed in the First Year of His present Majesty's Reign, for making general the Provisions of the said recited Act of the Fifty-sixth Year of the Reign of King George the Third.	The whole act. (Note: This Act was repealed in whole by the Statute Law Revision Act 1861. The Notes to the Statute Law Revision Act 1861 state "Repealed, except as to Scotland or Ireland, by 7 Geo. 4. c. 64. s. 32. Repealed, as to Ireland, by 9 Geo. 4. c. 53. s. 1. Semble, the Act here entered does not apply to Scotland. (Amended by 6 Geo. 4. c. 56.)")
3 Geo. 4. c. 38	Punishment for Manslaughter, etc. Act 1822	An Act passed in the Third Year of the present Reign, intituled An Act for the further and more adequate Punishment of Persons convicted of Manslaughter, and of Servants convicted of robbing their Masters, and of Accessories before the Fact to Grand Larceny and certain other Felonies.	As provides that Accessories before the Fact may be indicted for a Misdemeanor.
3 Geo. 4. c. 126	Turnpike Roads Act 1822	Another Act passed in the same Year, intituled An Act to amend the general Laws now in being for regulating Turnpike Roads in that Part of Great Britain called England.	As relates to stating in any Indictment any Things to be the Property of the Clerk to the Trustees or Commissioners, as therein mentioned. I.e., section 60.
6 Geo. 4. c. 56	Forgery Act 1825	An Act passed in the Sixth Year of the present Reign, intituled An Act to amend Two Acts for removing Difficulties in the Conviction of Offenders stealing Property in Mines and from Corporate Bodies.	The whole act. (Note: This Act was repealed in whole by the Statute Law Revision Act 1861. The Notes to the Statute Law Revision Act 1861 state "Repealed except as to Scotland or Ireland by 7 Geo. 4. c. 64. s. 32. Repealed as to Ireland by 9 Geo. 4. c. 53. s. 1. Semble, the Act only applied to England.")

== See also ==
- Abatement in pleading
- Criminal Law Act
- Statute Law Revision Act
