= Criminal Law Act 1827 =

Act of the Parliament of the United Kingdom

Criminal Law Act 1827 (Note: The citation of this act by this short title was authorised by section 1 of, and the first schedule to, the Short Titles Act 1896. Due to the repeal of those provisions it is now authorised by section 19(2) of the Interpretation Act 1978.)
- Act of Parliament
- Parliament of the United Kingdom
- Long title: An Act for further improving the Administration of Justice in Criminal Cases in England.
- Citation: 7 & 8 Geo. 4. c. 28
- Territorial extent: England and Wales (Note: Section 26.)

Dates
- Royal assent: 21 June 1827
- Commencement: 1 July 1827 (Note: Section 25.)
- Repealed: 1 January 1968
Other legislation
Amended by	Interpretation Act 1889; Indictments Act 1915; Criminal Justice Act 1948; Statute Law Revision Act 1963
Repealed by	Criminal Law Act 1967
Relates to	Peel's Acts; Criminal Statutes Repeal Act 1827; Criminal Law (Ireland) Act 1828; Criminal Law (India) Act 1828; Criminal Law Consolidation Acts 1861

Status: Repealed

Text of statute as originally enacted

The Criminal Law Act 1827 (7 & 8 Geo. 4. c. 28) was an act of the Parliament of the United Kingdom, applicable only to England and Wales. The act abolished many obsolete procedural devices in English criminal law, particularly the benefit of clergy.

The act was one of Peel's Acts which consolidated, repealed and replaced a large number of existing statutes. The enactments replaced by the act were repealed by the Criminal Statutes Repeal Act 1827 (7 & 8 Geo. 4. c. 27).

Similar provisions were made for Ireland by the Criminal Law (Ireland) Act 1828 (9 Geo. 4. c. 54) and for India by the Criminal Law (India) Act 1828 (9 Geo. 4. c. 74).

== Background ==
In the United Kingdom, acts of Parliament remain in force until expressly repealed. Blackstone's Commentaries on the Laws of England, published in the late 18th-century, raised questions about the system and structure of the common law and the poor drafting and disorder of the existing statute book.

In 1806, the Commission on Public Records passed a resolution requesting the production of a report on the best mode of reducing the volume of the statute book. From 1810 to 1825, The Statutes of the Realm was published, providing for the first time the authoritative collection of acts. In 1816, both Houses of Parliament, passed resolutions that an eminent lawyer with 20 clerks be commissioned to make a digest of the statutes, which was declared "very expedient to be done." However, this was never done.

In 1822, Sir Robert Peel entered the cabinet as home secretary and in 1826 introduced a number of reforms to the English criminal law, which became known as Peel's Acts. This included efforts to modernise, consolidate and repeal provisions from a large number of earlier statutes, including:

- Benefit of Clergy
- Larceny and other Offences of Stealing
- Burglary, Robbery and Threats for the Purpose of Robbery or of Extortion
- Embezzlement, False Pretences, and the Receipt of Stolen Property
- Malicious Injuries to Property
- Remedies against the Hundred

== Provisions ==
The act has sixteen parts. Parts I - V of the act concerned the formalities of pleading, Parts VI - VII of the act abolished benefit of clergy, Parts VIII - X of the act dealt with the punishment of felonies, Part XI of the act created offences related to fraudulent certificates of indictment, Part XII of the act covered criminal cases handled by the Court of Admiralty, Part XIII of the act made provision for pardons, and Parts XIV - XVI of the act were interpretation and jurisdiction provisions.

=== Part I: Mode of trial ===
Part I of the act of the act stated:

if any Person not having Privilege of Peerage, being arraigned upon any Indictment for Treason, Felony or Piracy, shall plead thereto a plea of "Not guilty", he shall by such Plea, without any further Form, be deemed to have put himself upon the Country for Trial.

Before this enactment, defendants who pleaded "not guilty" to a charge of felony were formally obliged to choose their mode of trial, in a standard exchange with the clerk of the court: "How wilt thou be tried?" "By God and my country." "God grant thee a good deliverance." By this process, the prisoner elected jury trial rather than trial by ordeal: however, as trial by ordeal had been officially abolished by a statute of Henry III in 1219, the prisoner in fact had no choice to make. Part I of the 1827 act removed the requirement for this formality.

=== Part II: Consequences of refusal to plead ===
Historically, prisoners who refused to plead to an indictment were tortured, in a process known as peine fort et dure, until they died or entered a plea. The "Act for the More Effectual Proceedings Against Persons Standing Mute", the Felony and Piracy Act 1772 (12 Geo. 3. c. 20) abolished this: instead, prisoners who refused to answer the indictment were deemed to have pleaded "Guilty", and were then sentenced for the crime. The Criminal Law Act 1827 reversed the position; "if any Person being arraigned or charged with any Indictment or Information ... shall stand mute of Malice, or not answer directly to the Indictment or Information, in every Case it shall be lawful for the Court, if it shall so think fit, to order the proper Officer to enter a Plea of 'Not guilty' on behalf of such Person".

=== Parts III - V ===
Part III of the act limited the number of peremptory challenges to jurors that a defendant could make; after the limit was reached, any subsequent challenges were to be disregarded. Part IV of the act restricted the plea of autrefois convict – "no Plea setting forth any Attainder shall be pleaded in bar of any Indictment unless the Attainder be for the same Offence as that charged in the Indictment." Part V prevented the jury from making any enquiries into the assets of the prisoner on a charge of felony – if the prisoner were convicted, these assets would be confiscated.

=== Parts VI - VII: Benefit of clergy ===
Part VI of the act stated - "And be it enacted, That benefit of clergy, with respect to persons convicted of felony, shall be abolished". Benefit of clergy was a traditional practice which enabled many convicted felons to avoid the death penalty by reading (or memorizing) a passage from the Bible; originally, this was held to prove that the defendant was in Holy Orders, and therefore subject to the jurisdiction of the ecclesiastical courts (which did not have the power to impose capital sentences) rather than the civil courts, but, by the eighteenth century, this was disregarded – female defendants, for whom being in Holy Orders was impossible, were entitled to claim benefit of clergy by the Benefit of Clergy, etc. Act 1691 (3 Will. & Mar. c. 9). Previously to the Criminal Law Act 1827, Parliament had responded to the perceived injustice by reducing the number of offences for which clergy could be claimed: the Criminal Law Act 1827 abolished it altogether. However, a statute of Edward VI also enabled peers to claim a similar benefit, and it was uncertain that this form of proceeding was covered by the words of the Criminal Law Act 1827. The abolition of the benefit for peers was abolished by the Felony Act 1841 (4 & 5 Vict. c. 22).

Part VII of the act preserved the relief from the death penalty that was formerly available to felons entitled to claim benefit of clergy.

=== Parts VIII - XI: Punishment of felons ===
Part VIII of the act specified the penalties for felonies for which no punishment was explicitly prescribed: imprisonment for up to two years, together with flogging for male offenders only, or transportation for up to seven years. Part IX allowed the imposition of hard labour as part of custodial sentences. Part X permitted consecutive sentences to be imposed on felons.

Part XI of the act provided for increased penalties (imprisonment for up to seven years or transportation for life) for repeat offenders, and made it a felony for any court official to produce fraudulent evidence of previous convictions.

=== Part XII: Admiralty cases ===
Part XII prescribed that "all Offences prosecuted in the High Court of Admiralty of England shall, upon every first and subsequent Conviction, be subject to the same Punishments, whether of Death or otherwise, as if such Offences had been committed upon the Land."

=== Part XIII: Pardons ===
Part XIII of the act dealt with pardons – "no free Pardon ... shall prevent or mitigate the Punishment to which the Offender might otherwise be lawfully sentenced on a subsequent Conviction".

=== Parts XIV - XVI ===
Part XIV of the act stated that references to males in the act included females, references to singular persons included multiple persons, and that the act applied to legal persons as well as natural persons. Part XV of the act specified the date on which the act was to come into force (1 July 1827), and Part XVI of the act excluded Scotland and Ireland from its provisions.

== Subsequent developments ==
In 1827, Peel's Acts were passed to modernise, consolidate and repeal provisions of the criminal law of England and Wales, including:

- The Criminal Statutes Repeal Act 1827 (7 & 8 Geo. 4. c. 27), which repealed over 140 enactments relating to the criminal law.
- The Criminal Law Act 1827 (7 & 8 Geo. 4. c. 28), which modernised the administration of criminal justice.
- The Larceny Act 1827 (7 & 8 Geo. 4. c. 29), which consolidated enactments relating to larceny.
- The Malicious Injuries to Property Act 1827 (7 & 8 Geo. 4. c. 30), which consolidated enactments relating to malicious injuries to property.
- The Remedies Against the Hundred (England) Act 1827 (7 & 8 Geo. 4. c. 31), which consolidated enactments relating to remedies against the hundred.

In 1828, parallel bills for Ireland to Peel's Acts were introduced, becoming:

- The Criminal Statutes (Ireland) Repeal Act 1828 (9 Geo. 4. 54), which repealed for Ireland over 140 enactments relating to the English criminal law.
- The Criminal Law (Ireland) Act 1828 (9 Geo. 4. 54), which modernised the administration of criminal justice
- The Larceny (Ireland) Act 1828 (9 Geo. 4. c. 55) which consolidated provisions in the law relating to larceny.
- The Malicious Injuries to Property (Ireland) Act 1828 (9 Geo. 4. c. 56), which consolidated provisions in the law relating to malicious injuries to property.

In 1828, the Offences Against the Person Act 1828 (9 Geo. 4. c. 31) was passed, which consolidated enactments relating to offences against the person and repealed for England and Wales almost 60 related enactments. In 1829, the Offences Against the Person (Ireland) Act 1829 (10 Geo. 4. c. 34) was passed, which consolidated enactments relating to offences against the person and repealed for Ireland almost 60 enactments relating to the criminal law of Ireland.

In 1861, bills were introduced, drafted by Charles Sprengel Greaves to mirror Peel's Acts, to consolidate and modernise the criminal law across:

- Offences Against the Person
- Malicious Injuries to Property
- Larceny
- Forgery
- Coining
- Accessories and Abettors

In 1861, the Criminal Consolidation Acts were passed for that purpose:

- The Accessories and Abettors Act 1861 (24 & 25 Vict. c. 94), which modernised provisions in the law relating to Aiding and abetting.
- The Criminal Statutes Repeal Act 1861 (24 & 25 Vict. c. 95), which repealed for England and Wales and Ireland over 100 enactments relating to the criminal law.
- The Larceny Act 1861 (24 & 25 Vict. c. 96), which modernised provisions in the law relating to larceny.
- The Malicious Damage Act 1861 (24 & 25 Vict. c. 97), which modernised provisions in the law relating to malicious injury to property.
- The Forgery Act 1861 (24 & 25 Vict. c. 98), which modernised provisions in the law relating to forgery.
- The Coinage Offences Act 1861 (24 & 25 Vict. c. 99), which modernised provisions in the law relating to coinage.
- The Offences Against the Person Act 1861 (24 & 25 Vict. c. 100), which modernised provisions in the law relating to offences against the person.

=== Repeal ===
In section 1, the words " not having privilege of peerage " were repealed by section 1 of, and the schedule to, the Statute Law Revision Act 1963, which came into force on 31 July 1963.

The whole act was repealed by section 10(2) of, and part III of schedule 3 to, the Criminal Law Act 1967, which came into force on 1 January 1968.

== See also ==
- Criminal Law Act
- Benefit of clergy
