= Criminal Statutes (Ireland) Repeal Act 1828 =

Act of the Parliament of the United Kingdom

- Act of Parliament
- Parliament of the United Kingdom
- Long title: An Act to repeal several Acts and Parts of Acts in force in Ireland, relating to Bail in Cases of Felony, and to certain Proceedings in Criminal Cases, and to the Benefit of Clergy, and to Larceny and other Offences connected therewith, and to malicious Injuries to Property.
- Citation: 9 Geo. 4. c. 53
- Introduced by: William Lamb, 2nd Viscount Melbourne MP (Commons)
- Territorial extent: Ireland (Note: Section 1.)

Dates
- Royal assent: 15 July 1828
- Commencement: 31 August 1828
- Repealed: 5 August 1873
Other legislation
Amends	See § Repealed enactments
Repeals/revokes	See § Repealed enactments
Repealed by	Statute Law Revision Act 1873
Relates to	Criminal Law Act 1827; Criminal Statutes Repeal Act 1827; Larceny Act 1827; Malicious Injuries to Property Act 1827; Remedies against the Hundred Act 1827; Offences Against the Person Act 1828; Criminal Law (Ireland) Act 1828; Larceny (Ireland) Act 1828; Malicious Injuries to Property (Ireland) Act 1828; Criminal Law (India) Act 1828; Offences Against the Person (Ireland) Act 1829; Forgery Act 1830; Coinage Offences Act 1832; Accessories and Abettors Act 1861; Criminal Statutes Repeal Act 1861; Larceny Act 1861; Malicious Damage Act 1861; Forgery Act 1861; Coinage Offences Act 1861; Offences Against the Person Act 1861

Status: Repealed

Text of statute as originally enacted

The Criminal Statutes (Ireland) Repeal Act 1828 (9 Geo. 4. c. 53) was an act of the Parliament of the United Kingdom that repealed for Ireland enactments relating to the criminal law from 1225 to 1826.

The act included repeals mirroring for Ireland the Criminal Statutes Repeal Act 1827 (7 & 8 Geo. 4 c. 27), including repealing acts of the Parliament of England extended to Ireland by Poynings' Act 1495.

Similar provision was made for India by the Criminal Law (India) Act 1828 (9 Geo. 4. c. 74).

== Background ==
In the United Kingdom, acts of Parliament remain in force until expressly repealed. Blackstone's Commentaries on the Laws of England, published in the late 18th-century, raised questions about the system and structure of the common law and the poor drafting and disorder of the existing statute book.

In 1806, the Commission on Public Records passed a resolution requesting the production of a report on the best mode of reducing the volume of the statute book. From 1810 to 1825, The Statutes of the Realm was published, providing for the first time the authoritative collection of acts. In 1816, both Houses of Parliament, passed resolutions that an eminent lawyer with 20 clerks be commissioned to make a digest of the statutes, which was declared "very expedient to be done." However, this was never done.

In 1822, Sir Robert Peel entered the cabinet as home secretary and in 1826 introduced a number of reforms to the English criminal law, which became known as Peel's Acts. This included efforts to modernise, consolidate and repeal provisions from a large number of earlier statutes, including:

- Benefit of Clergy
- Larceny and other Offences of Stealing
- Burglary, Robbery and Threats for the Purpose of Robbery or of Extortion
- Embezzlement, False Pretences, and the Receipt of Stolen Property
- Malicious Injuries to Property
- Remedies against the Hundred

In 1828, the Offences Against the Person Act 1828 (9 Geo. 4 c. 31) was passed, which consolidated for England and Wales provisions in the law related to offences against the person.

During the parliamentary debate for the Larceny Laws Repeal Bill in the House of Commons on 13 March 1827, which extended only to England and Wales, the home secretary Sir Robert Peel MP assured members of parliament that a similar bill was in preparation for Ireland.

In 1828, parallel bills for Ireland to Peel's Acts were introduced.

== Passage ==
The Larceny Acts Repeal (Ireland) Bill was brought in to the House of Commons on 6 May 1828 by the chief secretary for Ireland, William Lamb MP, Mr Doherty and Thomas Wallace, 1st Baron Wallace MP. The bill had its first reading in the House of Commons on 12 May 1828. The bill had its second reading in the House of Commons on 19 May 1828 and was committed to a committee of the whole house, which met and reported on 3 June 1828, with amendments. The amended bill was considered and agreed on 9 June 1828 and had its third reading in the House of Commons on 13 July 1828 and passed, without amendments.

The bill had its first reading in the House of Lords on 16 June 1828. The bill had its second reading on 24 June 1828 and was committed to a committee of the whole house which met on 1 July 1828 and reported on 2 July 1828, with amendments. The amended bill had its third reading on 3 July 1828 and passed, without amendments.

The amended bill was considered and agreed to by the House of Commons on 3 July 1828.

The bill was granted royal assent on 15 July 1828.

== Subsequent developments ==
In 1828, parallel bills for Ireland to Peel's Acts were introduced, becoming:

- The Criminal Statutes (Ireland) Repeal Act 1828 (9 Geo. 4. 54)
- The Criminal Law (Ireland) Act 1828 (9 Geo. 4. 54)
- The Larceny (Ireland) Act 1828 (9 Geo. 4. c. 55)
- The Malicious Injuries to Property (Ireland) Act 1828 (9 Geo. 4. c. 56)

The territorial extent of the act was limited to Ireland. Section 125 of the Criminal Law (India) Act 1828 (9 Geo. 4. c. 74) repealed for India all the acts listed in the act.

The territorial terms of the act led to several acts being for the avoidance of doubt for Scotland repealed by later Statute Law Revision Acts, including:

- Statute Law Revision Act 1861 (24 & 25 Vict. c. 101)
- Statute Law Revision Act 1867 (30 & 31 Vict. c. 59)
- Statute Law Revision Act 1872 (35 & 36 Vict. c. 63)
- Statute Law Revision Act 1873 (36 & 37 Vict. c. 91)
- Statute Law Revision Act 1887 (50 & 51 Vict. c. 59)
- Statute Law (Repeals) Act 1973 (1973 c. 39)

=== Repeal ===
The whole act was repealed by section 1 of, and the schedule to, the Statute Law Revision Act 1873 (36 & 37 Vict. c. 91), which came into force on 5 August 1873.

== Repealed enactments ==
Section 1 of the act repealed 142 enactments listed in that section. The territorial extent of the repeal, to take effect on 31 August 1828, was limited to Ireland and the jurisdiction of the Admiralty of Ireland. Section 1 of the act also stated that for offences and other matters committed or done before 31 August 1828, the repealed enactments will still apply as if the act had not been passed.

Section 2 of the act repealed all provisions in other laws that were designed to continue or perpetuate the acts being repealed by this legislation, to take effect on 31 August 1828.

Section 3 of the act stated that the extent of any repeals did not stretch to the Post Office, "any Branch of the Public Revenue", navy and army stores and other royal "Public Stores", with the exception of the Embezzlement of Naval, etc., Stores Act 1812 (52 Geo. 3 c. 12).

Parliament of England
Citation	Short title	Description	Extent of repeal
9 H. 3. st. 2. c. 10 (Note: See 25 Edw. 1.)	Charter of the Forest c. 10	A Charter or Statute made in the Ninth Year of the Reign of King Henry the Third, commonly called Charta de Forestá.	As relates to the Punishment for taking the King's Venison
3 Edw. 1. c. 2	Statute of Westminster 1275 Benefit of clergy	A Statute made at Westminster in the Third Year of the Reign of King Edward the First.	As relates to Clerks taken for guilty of Felony
3 Edw. 1. c. 15	Statute of Westminster 1275 Benefit of clergy	A Statute made at Westminster in the Third Year of the Reign of King Edward the First.	As provides what Prisoners shall not be replevisable. (Note: This Act was not repealed by the Criminal Statutes Repeal Act 1827.)
3 Edw. 1. c. 20	Statute of Westminster 1275 Trespassers in parks and ponds	A Statute made at Westminster in the Third Year of the Reign of King Edward the First.	As relates to Trespassers in Parks and Ponds.
21 Edw. 1. st. 2.	Statutum de Malefactoribus in Parcis	A Statute made in the Twenty first Year of the same Reign, intituled Statutum de Malefactoribus in Parcis.	The whole act.
33 Edw. 1	Ordinatio de Inquisitionibus	An Ordinance made in the Thirty-third Year of the Reign of King Edward the First, commonly called An Ordinance for Inquests.	The whole act. (Note: This Act was repealed again by the Juries (Ireland) Act 1833.)
1 Edw. 3. st. 1. c. 8	Offences in Forests	A Statute made in the First Year of the Reign of King Edward the Third.	As relates to Trespasses in the King's Forests of Vert and Venison.
25 Edw. 3. st. 6. (Note: vulgo st. 3) c. 4	An Ordinance for the Clergy Benefit of clergy	A Statute made in the Twenty fifth Year of the same Reign, intituled Ordinatio pro Clero.	As relates to Clerks convicted of Treasons or Felonies.
25 Edw. 3. st. 6. (Note: vulgo st. 3) c. 5	An Ordinance for the Clergy Benefit of clergy	A Statute made in the Twenty fifth Year of the same Reign, intituled Ordinatio pro Clero.	As relates to the Arraignment of Clerks.
34 Edw. 3. c. 22	Finding of hawks	A Statute made in the Thirty fourth Year.	As relates to Hawks.
37 Edw. 3. c. 19	N/A	Another Statute made in the Thirty seventh Year of the same Reign.	As relates to Hawks.
7 Hen. 5.	Indictments, forgery	A Statute made in the seventh Year of King Henry the Fifth.	As relates to those that forge or make untrue Charters or Muniments. (Note: This Act was not included in the Criminal Statutes Repeal Act 1827.)
9 Hen. 5. Stat. 1. c. 1	Indictments, etc.	A Statute made in the Ninth Year of the same Reign.	As relates to Indictments and Appeals in a non-existing Place. (Note: This Act was not included in the Criminal Statutes Repeal Act 1827. This Act was repealed except for Scotland and Ireland by the Criminal Law Act 1826 (7 Geo. 4. c. 64).)
8 Hen. 6. c. 12	Amendment Act 1429	So much of a Statute made in the Eighth Year of the Reign of King Henry the Sixth.	As relates to the Offences of stealing, taking away, withdrawing, or avoiding of any Record or other like Thing therein mentioned. I.e., section 3.
23 Hen. 6. c. 9	Sheriffs and Bailiffs, Fees, etc. Act 1444	A Statute made in the Twenty-third Year of the same Reign.	As relates to Sheriffs, and other Officers and Ministers therein mentioned, letting out of Prison upon Sureties any Person in Custody upon Indictment. (Note: This Act was not included in the Criminal Statutes Repeal Act 1827.)
33 Hen. 6. c. 1	Embezzlement	A Statute made in the Thirty third Year of the same Reign.	As relates to Servants taking and spoiling the Goods.
1 Ric. 3. c. 3	Felony Act 1483	An Act passed in the First Year of the Reign of King Richard the Third, intituled An Act for bailing of Persons suspected of Felony.	The whole act. (Note: This Act was not included in the Criminal Statutes Repeal Act 1827. This Act was repealed except for Scotland and Ireland by the Criminal Law Act 1826 (7 Geo. 4. c. 64).)
1 Hen. 7. c. 7	Hunting in Forests Act 1485	An Act passed in the First Year of the Reign of King Henry the Seventh, intituled An Act against unlawful Hunting in Forests and Parks.	The whole act.
1 Hen. 7. c. 7	Hunting in Forests Act 1485	An Act passed in the First Year of the Reign of King Henry the Seventh, intituled An Act against unlawful Hunting in Forests and Parks.	The whole act.
3 Hen. 7. c. 3	Taking of Bail by Justices Act 1487	An Act passed in the Third Year of the same Reign, intituled An Act that Justices of the Peace may take Bail.	As relates to Bail or Mainprize. (Note: This Act was not included in the Criminal Statutes Repeal Act 1827.)
4 Hen. 7. c. 13	Benefit of Clergy Act 1488	An Act passed in the Fourth Year of the same Reign, intituled An Act to take away the Benefit of Clergy from certain Persons.	The whole act.

Parliament of Ireland
Citation	Short title	Description	Extent of repeal
3 Edw. 2. c. 1 (I)	N/A	An Act passed in the Third Year of the Reign of King Edward the Second, intituled An Act to restrain great Lords from taking of Prises, Lodging, and Sojourning, against the Will of the Owner.	The whole act.
18 Hen. 6 (1439). c. 3 (I)	N/A	An Act passed in the Eighteenth Year of the Reign of King Henry the Sixth, intituled An Act that no Lord or other shall charge the King's Subjects with Horses, Horsemen, or Footmen, without their good Wills; the Offender a Traitor.	The whole act.
35 Hen. 6. c. 2 (I)	N/A	An Act passed in the Thirty-fifth Year of the same Reign, intituled An Act that every Man shall answer for the Offence of his Sons, as the Offender ought to do, saving Punishment of Death.	The whole act.
36 Hen. 6. c. 3 (I)	N/A	An Act passed in the same Thirty- fifth Year of the same Reign, 35 H.6. c.3. intituled An Act that Persons not amenable to the Law shall not enter, distrain, rob, threaten, or kill any Tenants for any Lands or Tenements, contrary to the Common Law, but shall first show their Title to the Governor and Council, and thereupon have Licence to distrain or enter in peaceable Manner.	The whole act.
15 Edw. 4. c. 1 (I)	N/A	Act passed in the Fifteenth Year of the Reign of King Edward the Fourth, intituled An Act prohibiting Distresses to be taken contrary to the Common Law.	The whole act.
10 Hen. 7. c. 17 (I)	N/A	An Act passed in the Tenth Year of the Reign of King Henry the Seventh, intituled An Act that no Peace nor War be made with any Man without a Licence of the Governor.	The whole act.
13 Hen. 8. c. 1 (I)	N/A	An Act passed in the Thirteenth Year of the Reign of King Henry the Eighth, intituled An Act for burning of Corn as well in Ricks in the Fields as in Villages and Towns.	The whole act.
28 Hen. 8. c. 10 (I)	N/A	An Act passed in the Twenty-eighth Year of the same Reign, intituled An Act how Persons robbed shall be restored to their. Goods.	The whole act.
33 Hen. 8. st. 1. c. 5 (I)	N/A	An Act passed in the First Session of the Thirty-third Year of the same Reign, intituled An Act that maketh it Felony to any Man to run away with his Master's Casket.	The whole act.
3 & 4 Phil. & Mar. c. 6 (I)	N/A	An Act passed in the c.5. Session of Parliament holden in the Third and Fourth Years of the Reign of King Phillip and Queen Mary, intituled An Act that the Owners of Goods stolen may be restored thereunto.	The whole act.
11, 12, 13 Jas. 1. c. 3 (I)	N/A	An Act passed in the Session of Parliament holden in the Eleventh, Twelfth, and Thirteenth Years of the Reign of King James the First, intituled An Act for the taking away of Clergy in certain Cases of Felonies, and for Deliverie of Clerakes Convict without Purgation.	Save and except so far as the said Act relates to any felonious Rape or Ravishment.
10 C. 1. St. 2. c. 18 (I)	N/A	An Act passed in the Second Session of the Tenth Year of the Reign of King Charles the First, intituled An Act appointing an Order to Justices of Peace, touching the Bailment, committing, and taking Examination of Prisoners, &c.	The whole act.
10 C. 1. St. 2. c. 19 (I)	N/A	An Act passed in the same Session, intituled An Act for the Tryall of Murders and Felonies committed in several Counties, &c.	The whole act.
10 c. 1. St. 2. c. 23 (I)	N/A	An Act passed in the same Session, intituled An Act to avoyde and prevent diverse Misdemeanors in idle and lewd Persons in barking of Trees, &c.	The whole act.
10 c. 1. St. 3. c. 16 (I)	N/A	An Act passed in the Third Session of the same Year of the same Reign, intituled An Act concerning Women convicted of small Felonies.	The whole act.
10 & 11 C. 1. c. 9 (I)	N/A	An Act passed in the Session of Parliament holden in the Tenth and Eleventh Years of the same Reign, intituled An Act for the limiting of peremptory Challenges in Cases of Treason and Felonies, &c.	The whole act.
10 & 11 C. 1. c. 15 (I)	Cruelty to Horses and Sheep Act 1634	An Act passed in the same Years of the same Reign, intituled An Act against ploughing by the Tayle, and pulling the Wooll off living Sheep.	The whole Act
10 & 11 C. 1. c. 17 (I)	N/A	An Act passed in the same Years of the same Reign, intituled An Act to prevent the unprofitable Custom of burning of Corn in the Straw.	The whole act.
15 C. 1. c. 7 (I)	N/A	An Act passed in the Fifteenth Year of the same Reign, intituled An Act concerning Clergy.	The whole act.
9 Will. 3. c. 7 (I)	Benefit of Clergy Act 1697	An Act passed in the Ninth Year of the Reign of King William the Third, intituled An Act for taking away the Benefit of Clergy in some Cases.	The whole act.
4 Ann. c. 11 (I)	Sale of Horses Act 1705	An Act passed in the Fourth Year of the Reign of Queen Anne, intituled An Act against Horse Stealing, and to prevent the buying and selling of stolen Horses, and for punishing all Accessaries to Felonies.	As relates to Buyers or Receivers of Stolen Goods, or Accessaries to Felonies. I.e., section 5
8 Anne. c. 8 (I)	N/A	An Act passed in the Eighth Year of the same Reign, intituled An Act for the encouraging the Discovery and apprehending of Housebreakers.	As relates to Buyers or Receivers of stolen Goods, or to Harbourers of Burglars or Thieves. I.e., sections 5 and 6.
9 Anne. c. 6 (I)	Criminal Evidence Act 1710	An Act passed in the Ninth Year of the same Reign, intituled An Act for taking away the Benefit of Clergy in certain Cases and for taking away the Book in all Cases, and for repealing Part of the Statute for transporting Felons.	Save and except such Part thereof as relates to the Offence of having carnal Knowledge of any Female Child, or as relates to Witnesses. I.e., except sections 3, 8 and 9
9 Anne. c. 11 (I)	N/A	An Act passed in the Ninth Year of the same Reign, intituled An Act to prevent the maiming of Cattle.	As makes any Offence therein mentioned a Felony. I.e., section 3
2 Geo. 1. c. 17 (I)	Servants Act 1715	An Act passed in the Second Year of the Reign of King George the First, intituled An Act to empower Justices of the Peace to determine Disputes about Servants, Artificers, Day Labourers Wages, and other small Demands, and to oblige Masters to pay the same, and to punish idle and disorderly Servants.	As relates to the hereinbefore recited Act of the Thirty-third Year of the Reign of King Henry the Eighth. I.e., section 19
2 Geo. 1. c. 22 (I)	N/A	An Act passed in the Second Year of the Reign of King George the First, intituled An Act for making more effectual an Act, intituled, ‘An Act to prevent the maiming of Cattle’.	The whole Act
4 Geo. 1. c. 4 (I)	N/A	an Act passed in the Fourth Year of the same Reign, intituled An Act for the preserving of all such Ships and Goods thereof which shall happen to be forced on Shore or stranded upon the Coasts of this Kingdom.	As makes any Offence therein mentioned a Felony. I.e., sections 5 and 6.
6 Geo. 1. c. 12 (I)	N/A	An Act passed in the Sixth Year of the same Reign, intituled An Act for the better and more effectual apprehending and transporting Felons and others, and for continuing and amending several Laws made in this Kingdom for suppressing Tories, Robbers, and Rapparees.	As authorises the Punishment of Transportation instead of burning in the Hand or Whipping, and as relates to the Offence of taking Money or Reward for helping Persons to stolen Property. I.e., sections 3, 4 and 5.
1 Geo. 2. c. 24 (I)	N/A	An Act passed in the First Year of the Reign of King George the Second, intituled An Act for preventing the embezzling of Goods under the Value of Forty Shillings by Servants, and the malicious Destruction of Engines and other Things belonging to Mines.	The whole act.
3 Geo. 2. c. 4 (I)	Perjury Act 1729	An Act passed in the Third Year of the same Reign, intituled An Act for the more effectual preventing and further Punishment of Forgery, Perjury, and Subornation of Perjury, and to make it Felony to steal Bonds, Notes, or other Securities for Payment of Money, and for the more effectual transporting Felons, Vagabonds, and others.	As relates to the stealing or taking by Robbery of any Securities for Money therein enumerated. I.e., sections 2, 3 and 6.
3 Geo. 2. c. 14 (I)	N/A	An Act passed in the same Third Year of the same Reign, intituled An Act to prevent unlawful Combinations of Workmen, Artificers, and Labourers, employed in the several Trades and Manufactures of this Kingdom, and for the better Payment of their Wages, as also to prevent Abuses in making of Bricks, and to ascertain their Dimensions.	As relates to the Offence of injuring or destroying any Goods, Wares, or Work. I.e., section 7.
5 Geo. 2. c. 10 (I)	N/A	An Act passed in the Fifth Year of the same Reign, intituled An Act for the more effectual punishing Stealers of Lead or Iron Bars fixed to Houses, or any Fences belonging thereunto.	The whole act.
7 Geo. 2. c. 8 (I)	N/A	An Act passed in the Seventh Year of the same Reign, intituled An Act for the more effectual Discovery of Deer Stealers.	The whole act.
17 Geo. 2. c. 5 (I)	Slaughter of Cattle Act 1743	An Act passed in the Seventeenth Year of the same Reign, intituled An Act to amend and make more effectual the Laws to prevent the maiming, killing, and destroying of Cattle, and to prevent Frauds committed by Butchers dressing Meat for Sale.	As makes any Offence therein mentioned a Felony. I.e., sections 1, 2 and 3.
17 Geo. 2. c. 6 (I)	N/A	An Act passed in the same Year, intituled An Act to take away the Benefit of Clergy from any Person that shall, by Night or by Day-time, feloniously and privately steal any Goods out of any Shop, Warehouse, Tan Yard, Drying House, Cellar, or Outhouse, though not adjoining to any Dwelling House, or off of Quays, and to encourage Persons to apprehend such Felons and other Robbers.	As makes any Offence therein mentioned a Felony.
21 Geo. 2. c. 12 (I)	N/A	An Act passed in the Twenty- first Year of the same Reign, intituled An Act for the more effectual Punishment of Assaults with Intent to commit Robbery.	The whole act.
29 Geo. 2. c. 12 (I)	N/A	An Act passed in the Twenty-ninth Year of the same Reign, intituled An Act to prevent unlawful Combinations of Tenants, Colliers, Miners, and others, and the sending of threatening Letters without Names, or with fictitious Names subscribed thereto, and the malicious Destruction of Carriages; and for the more effectual Punishment of wicked Persons who shall maliciously set fire to Houses or Outhouses, or to Stacks of Hay, Corn, Straw, or Turf, or to Ships or Boats.	As makes any Offence therein mentioned a Felony. I.e., sections 3, 4.
29 Geo. 2. c. 16 (I)	N/A	An Act passed in the same Year of the same Reign, intituled An Act for promoting Public Credit.	As makes any Offence therein mentioned a Felony. I.e., sections 3.
31 Geo. 2. c. 10 (I)	N/A	An Act passed in the Thirty-first Year of the same Reign, intituled An Act for the more effectual preventing Frauds and Abuses committed by Persons employed in the Manufacture of Hats, and in the Fustian, Cotton, Iron, Furr, Wollen, Mohair, and Silk Manufactures of this Kingdom; and for continuing and amending an Act made in the Seventh Year of His present Majesty's Reign, intituled ' An Act to prevent Frauds and ' Abuses in Bay Yarns exported to Great Britain'.	Save and except so far as the said Act relates to Yarn. I.e., except sections 11 and 12.
7 Geo. 3. c. 23 (I)	N/A	An Act passed in the Seventh Year of the Reign of King George the Third, intituled An Act for the further Preservation of Woods and Timber Trees.	The whole act.
13 & 14 Geo. 3. c. 16 (I)	N/A	An Act passed in the Session of Parliament holden in the Thirteenth and Fourteenth Years of the same Reign, intituled An Act for the more effectual proceeding against Persons standing mute on their Arraignment for Murder, Felony, or Piracy.	The whole act.
15 & 16 Geo. 3. c. 26 (I)	Timber Act 1775	An Act passed in the Session of Parliament holden in the Fifteenth and Sixteenth Years of the same Reign, intituled An Act for the encouraging the Cultivation, and for the better Preservation of Trees, Shrubs, Plants, and Roots.	Save and except such Part thereof as declares what shall be deemed Timber Trees, and except so far as relates to any Certificates therein mentioned. I.e., except sections 1, 3 and 5.
15 & 16 Geo. 3. c. 33 (I)	N/A	An Act passed in the same Session of Parliament, intituled An Act for the more effectual preventing the plundering of Ships or Vessels which may be wrecked or stranded on the Coasts of this Kingdom.	The whole act.
19 & 20 Geo. 3. c. 19 (I)	Obstruction of Trade Act 1779	An Act passed in the Session of Parliament holden in the Nineteenth and Twentieth Years of the same Reign, intituled An Act to prevent Combinations, and for the further Encouragement of Trade.	As relates to breaking or entering by force into any House or Shop with any Intent in the said Act mentioned, and as relates to any wilful or malicious Injury to any Manufacture, or any Tools employed in the making thereof, or any Mill, Engine, or Device for the making or perfecting thereof, or to be employed therein. I.e., sections 5
19 & 20 Geo. 3. c. 37 (I)	N/A	An Act passed in the same Session of Parliament, intituled An Act to prevent the detestable Practices of houghing Cattle, burning of Houses, Barns, Haggards, and Corn, and for other Purposes.	As relates to Searches and Search Warrants for stolen Lambs. I.e., section 5.
23 & 24 Geo. 3. c. 39 (I)	Timber Act 1783	An Act passed in the Session of Parliament holden in the Twenty-third and Twenty-fourth Years of the same Reign, intituled An Act to amend the Laws for the Encouragement of planting Timber Trees.	As relates to any Conviction for a Second or Third Offence of cutting down, pulling up, barking, or otherwise destroying any Tree or Trees, or as relates to any Felony. I.e., sections 17 and 18.
23 & 24 Geo. 3. c. 45 (I)	Receivers of Stolen Goods Act 1783	An Act passed in the same Session of Parliament, intituled An Act for the more easy Discovery and effectual Punishment of Buyers and Receivers of Stolen Goods.	The whole act.
23 & 24 Geo. 3. c. 48 (I)	N/A	An Act passed in the same Session of Parliament, intituled An Act for the Amendment of the Law in relation to the Salvage of Ships and Goods stranded or in danger of perishing at Sea.	Save and except so far as relates to Salvage. I.e., sections 1 to 4.
26 Geo. 3. c. 37 (I)	N/A	An Act passed in the Twenty-sixth Year of the same Reign, intituled An Act for the more effectual Punishment of Persons who shall attain or attempt to attain Possession of Money or Goods by false Pretences or by Threats.	The whole act.
27 Geo. 3. c. 30 (I)	N/A	An Act passed in the Twenty-seventh Year of the same Reign, intituled An Act for directing the Application of the Funds granted by Parliament or promoting and carrying on Inland Navigation in this Kingdom, and for the Purposes therein mentioned.	As relates to any wilful and malicious Injury to any Works or Parts of any Canal or Inland Navigation. I.e., sections 22.
27 Geo. 3. c. 34 (I)	N/A	An Act passed in the same Year, intituled An Act to prevent the stealing of Dogs.	The whole act.
27 Geo. 3. c. 52 (I)	Stealing Lead, Iron, etc. Act 1787	An Act passed in the same Year, intituled An Act to punish more effectually Persons who shall steal any old Lead, Iron Bars, or Rails, or Iron or Brass Knockers.	The whole act.
27 Geo. 3. c. 53 (I)	N/A	An Act passed in the same Year intituled An Act for preventing the wilful Destruction of Turnpike Gates, and for the better securing the Payment of Tolls at such Gates.	As relates to any Injury to any Turnpike Gate, or to any other Thing therein mentioned. I.e., section 1.
28 Geo. 3. c. 37 (I)	Sheep Stealing Act 1788	An Act passed in the Twenty-eighth Year of the same Reign, intituled An Act for the better Preservation of Sheep, and the more speedy Detection of Sheep- Stealers.	The whole act.
31 Geo. 3. c. 23 (I)	N/A	An Act passed in the Thirty-first Year of the same Reign, intituled An Act to amend an Act, intituled ‘An Act to prevent the Practice of seducing Artificers and Manufacturers of this Kingdom, and of exporting the several Tools and Utensils made use of in preparing and working up the Manufactures thereof into Parts beyond the Seas’.	As relates to any Apprentice or other Person wilfully cutting, defacing, spoiling, or by Mismanagement or Neglect injuring any Work, or any Loom, Tool, or Materials. I.e., section 3.
36 Geo. 3. c. 29 (I)	N/A	An Act passed in the Thirty-sixth Year of the same Reign, intituled An Act to render Persons convicted of Petty Larceny competent Witnesses.	The whole act.
36 Geo. 3. c. 45 (I)	N/A	An Act passed in the same Year, intituled An Act for the better Regulation of the Woollen and Cotton Manufactures.	The whole act.

Parliament of the United Kingdom
Citation	Short title	Description	Extent of repeal
43 G. 3. c. 58	Malicious Shooting or Stabbing Act 1803	An Act passed in the Forty-third Year of the Reign of King George the Third, intituled An Act for the further Prevention, of malicious shooting and attempting to discharge loaded Fire Arms, stabbing, cutting, wounding, poisoning, and the malicious using of Means to procure the Miscarriage of Women; and also the malicious setting fire Part of Buildings; and also for repealing a certain Act made in England in the Twenty-first Year of the late King James, intituled ‘An Act to prevent the destroying and Murdering of Bastard Children’; and also an Act made in Ireland in the Sixth Year of the Reign of the late Queen Anne, also intituled, ' An Act to prevent the destroying and murdering of Bastard Children’; and for making other Provisions in lieu thereof.	As relates to the setting fire to any of the Buildings therein enumerated. (Note: This Act was not included in the Criminal Statutes Repeal Act 1827.) I.e., part of section 1.
43 G. 3. c. 79	Wrecking (Ireland) Act 1803	An Act passed in the same Year, intituled An Act for making more effectual Provisions, within Ireland, for the Punishment of Offences in wilfully casting away, sinking, burning, or destroying Ships and Vessels, and for the more convenient Trial of Accessaries in Felonies.	The whole act. (Note: This Act was not included in the Criminal Statutes Repeal Act 1827.)
43 G. 3. c. 86	Unlawful Combinations (Ireland) Act 1803	An Act passed in the same Year, intituled An Act to prevent unlawful Combinations of Workmen, Artificers, Journeymen, and Labourers, in Ireland, and for other Purposes relating thereto.	As relates to wilfully damnifying, spoiling, destroying, selling, or otherwise disposing of any Goods, Wares, Work, or Materials. (Note: This Act was not included in the Criminal Statutes Repeal Act 1827.) I.e., section 8.
44 G. 3. c. 92	Apprehension of Offenders Act 1804	An Act passed in the Forty-fourth Year of the same Reign, intituled An Act to render more easy the apprehending and bringing to Trial Offenders escaping from One Part of the United Kingdom to the other, and also from One County to another.	As relates to the Prosecution and Punishment of Persons for Theft or Larceny, and for receiving or having any stolen Property as therein mentioned. I.e., sections 7 and 8.
51 G. 3. c. 38	Embezzlement (Ireland) Act 1811	An Act passed in the Fifty-first Year of the same Reign, intituled An Act to protect Masters against Embezzlements by their Clerks and Servants in Ireland.	The whole act. (Note: This Act was not included in the Criminal Statutes Repeal Act 1827.)
51 G. 3. c. 39	Stealing from Bleaching Grounds (Ireland) Act 1811	An Act passed in the same Year, intituled An Act to repeal so much of An Act passed in the Parliament of Ireland in the Third Year of the Reign of His present Majesty, intituled An Act for the better Regulation of the Linen and Hemp Manufactures ' as takes away the Benefit of Clergy from Felons convicted of stealing Cloth from Bleaching Grounds, and for more effectually preventing such Felonies.	The whole act. (Note: This Act was not included in the Criminal Statutes Repeal Act 1827.)
52 G. 3. c. 12	Embezzlement of Naval, etc., Stores Act 1812	An Act passed in the Fifty-second Year of the same Reign, intituled An Act for the extending the Laws for preventing the Embezzlement of His Majesty's Naval, extending Ordnance, and Victualling Stores, to Ireland.	As relates to an Act of the Twenty- second Year of King Charles the Second, for taking away the Benefit of Clergy from such as steal Cloth from the Rack, and from such as steal or embezzle His Majesty's Ammunition and Stores. (Note: This Act was not included in the Criminal Statutes Repeal Act 1827.) I.e., extending 22 Car. 2. c. 5.
52 G. 3. c. 3. 63	Embezzlement by Bankers, etc. Act 1812	An Act passed in the same Year of the same Reign, intituled An Act for more effectually preventing the Embezzlement of Securities for Money and other Effects left or deposited for safe Custody or other special Purpose in the Hands of Bankers, Merchants, Brokers, Attornies, or other Agents.	The whole act.
52 G. 3. c. 3. 64	Obtaining Bonds, etc., Under False Pretences Act 1812	An Act passed in the same Year, intituled An Act for the extending the Provisions of an Act of the Thirtieth Year of King George the Second, against Persons obtaining Money by false Pretences, to Persons so obtaining Bonds and other Securities.	The whole act. (Note: This Act was repealed in whole by the Statute Law Revision Act 1861. The Notes to the Statute Law Revision Act 1861 state: "Repealed as to England, by 7 & 8 Geo. 4. c. 27. s. 1. as to Ireland, by 9 Geo. 4. c. 53. s. 1. as to India, by 9 Geo. 4. c. 74. s. 125. It is conceived this Act does not apply to Scotland.")
52 G. 3. c. 130	Malicious Damage Act 1812	An Act passed in the same Year, intituled An Act for the more effectual Punishment of Persons destroying the Properties of His Majesty's Subjects, and enabling the Owners of such Properties to recover Damages for the Injury sustain.	The whole act. (Note: This Act was repealed in whole by the Statute Law (Repeals) Act 1973.)
56 G. 3. c. 73	Lotteries Act 1815	An Act passed in the Fifty-sixth Year of the same Reign, intituled An Act for removing Difficulties in the Conviction of Offenders stealing Property from Mines.	The whole act. (Note: This Act was not included in the Criminal Statutes Repeal Act 1827. This Act was repealed by the Statute Law Revision Act 1861. The Notes to the Statute Law Revision Act 1861 state "Repealed Except as to Scotland or Ireland, by 7 Geo. 4. c. 64. s. 32. As to Ireland, by 9 Geo. 4. c. 53. Semble, the Act here entered does not extend to Scotland. (Extended by 1 Geo. 4. c. 102. Amended by 6 Geo. 4. c. 56.)")
58 G. 3. c. 68	Larceny (Ireland) Act 1818	An Act passed in the Fifty-eighth Year of the same Reign intituled An Act to repeal so much of an Act passed in Ireland in the Ninth Year of the Reign of Queen Anne, intituled ' An Act for taking away the Benefit of Clergy in certain Cases, and for taking away the Book in all Cases, and for repealing Part of the Statute for transporting Felons,' as takes away the Benefit of Clergy from Persons stealing privily from the Person of another; and more effectually to prevent the Crime of Larceny from the Person.	The whole act. (Note: This Act was not included in the Criminal Statutes Repeal Act 1827.)
59 G. 3. c. 3. 27	Felony Act 1819	An Act passed in the Fifty-ninth Year of the same Reign, intituled An Act to facilitate the Trial of Felonies committed on board Vessels employed on Canals, navigable Rivers, and Inland Navigations.	The whole act. (Note: This Act was not included in the Criminal Statutes Repeal Act 1827. This Act was repealed except for Scotland and Ireland by the Criminal Law Act 1826 (7 Geo. 4. c. 64).)
59 G. 3. c. 96	Felonies on Stage Coaches Act 1819	An Act passed in the same Year, intituled An Act to facilitate the Trial of Felonies committed on Stage Coaches and Stage Waggons and other such Carriages, and of Felonies committed on the Boundaries of Counties.	The whole act. (Note: This Act was not included in the Criminal Statutes Repeal Act 1827. This Act was repealed except for Scotland and Ireland by the Criminal Law Act 1826 (7 Geo. 4. c. 64). This act was wholly repealed by the Statute Law Revision Act 1887 (50 & 51 Vict. c. 59).)
1 G. 4. c. 56	Malicious Trespass Act 1820	An Act passed in the First Year of the Reign of His present Majesty, intituled An Act for the summary Punishment in certain Cases of Persons wilfully or maliciously damaging or committing Trespasses on public or private Property.	The whole act.
1 G. 4. c. 102	Indictments Act 1820	An Act passed in the same Year, for making general the Provisions of the hereinbefore recited Act of the Fifty-sixth Year of the Reign of King George the Third	The whole act. (Note: This Act was not included in the Criminal Statutes Repeal Act 1827. This Act was repealed by the Statute Law Revision Act 1861. The Notes to the Statute Law Revision Act 1861 state "Repealed, except as to Scotland or Ireland, by 7 Geo. 4. c. 64. s. 32. Repealed, as to Ireland, by 9 Geo. 4. c. 53. s. 1. Semble, the Act here entered does not apply to Scotland. (Amended by 6 Geo. 4. c. 56.)")
1 & 2 G. 4. c. 34	Capital Punishment (Ireland) Act 1821	An Act passed in the Session of Parliament holden in the First and Second Years of His present Majesty's Reign, intituled An Act to repeal so much of Two Acts made in the Parliament of Ireland in the Ninth Year of Queen Anne, and in the Seventeenth Year of King George the Second, as inflicts Capital Punishment on Persons guilty of stealing to the Amount of Five Shillings out of or from Shops, Warehouses, and other Outbuildings and Places, and to provide more suitable and effectual Punishment for such Offences.	The whole act. (Note: This Act was not included in the Criminal Statutes Repeal Act 1827.)
3 G. 4. c. 24	Receivers of Stolen Goods, etc. Act 1822	An Act passed in the Third Year of His present Majesty's Reign, intituled An Act for extending the Laws against Receivers of Stolen Goods to Receivers of stolen Bonds, Bank Notes, or other Securities for Money.	The whole act.
3 G. 4. c. 38	Punishment for Manslaughter, etc. Act 1822	An Act passed in the same Year, intituled An Act for the further and more adequate Punishment of Persons convicted of Manslaughter, and of Servants convicted of robbing their Masters, and of Accessories before the Fact of Grand Larceny, and certain other Felonies.	Except as far as the said Act relates to Manslaughter. I.e., except section 1.
3 G. 4. c. 114	Hard Labour Act 1822	An Act passed in the same Year, intituled An Act to provide for the more effectual Punishment of certain Offences by Imprisonment with hard Labour.	As relates to the Punishment of receiving stolen Goods, and for obtaining any Property as therein mentioned by false Pretences
5 G. 4. c. 30	Stealing of Records, etc. Act 1824	An Act passed in the Fifth Year of His present Majesty's Reign, intituled An Act to prevent the stealing of Records, Deeds, and Papers, in Ireland.	The whole act. (Note: This Act was not included in the Criminal Statutes Repeal Act 1827.)
6 G. 4. c. 19	Threatening Letters Act 1825	An Act passed in the Sixth Year of His present Majesty's Reign, intituled An Act for the Amendment of the Law as to the Offence of sending threatening Letters.	The whole act. (Note: This Act was not included in the Criminal Statutes Repeal Act 1827. This Act was repealed by the Statute Law Revision Act 1861. The Notes to the Statute Law Revision Act 1861 state "Repealed As to England, by 7 & 8 Geo. 4. c. 27. s. 1. As to Ireland, by 9 Geo. 4. c. 53. s. 1. As to India, by 9 Geo. 4. c. 74. s. 125. Semble, this Act does not apply to Scotland. It is indexed by the King's Printers as relating only to England.")
6 G. 4. c. 56	Forgery Act 1825	An Act passed in the same Year, intituled An Act to amend Two Acts for removing Difficulties in the Conviction of Offenders stealing Property in Mines, and from Corporate Bodies.	The whole act. (Note: This Act was not included in the Criminal Statutes Repeal Act 1827. This Act was repealed by the Statute Law Revision Act 1861. The Notes to the Statute Law Revision Act 1861 state "Repealed except as to Scotland or Ireland by 7 Geo. 4. c. 64. s. 32. Repealed as to Ireland by 9 Geo. 4. c. 53. s. 1. Semble, the Act only applied to England.")
6 G. 4. c. 42	Bankers (Ireland) Act 1825	An Act passed in the Sixth Year of His present Majesty's Reign, intituled An Act for the better Regulation of Copartnerships of certain Bankers in Ireland.	As makes any Offence therein mentioned a Felony. (Note: This Act was not included in the Criminal Statutes Repeal Act 1827.) I.e., section 23.
6 G. 4. c. 94	Factor Act 1825	An Act passed in the same Year, intituled An Act to alter and amend an Act for the better Protection of the Property of Merchants and others, who may hereafter enter into Contracts or Agreements, in relation to Goods, Wares, or Merchandize intrusted to Factors or Agents.	As relates to any Misdemeanor therein mentioned. I.e., sections 7, 8, 9 and 10
7 G. 4. c. 9	Hard Labour (Ireland) Act 1826	An Act passed in the Seventh Year of His present Majesty's Reign, intituled An Act to provide for the more effectual Punishment of certain Offences in Ireland, by Imprisonment with hard Labour.	As relates to Grand or Petty Larceny, or to receiving stolen Goods, or to false Pretences. (Note: This Act was not included in the Criminal Statutes Repeal Act 1827.)
7 G. 4. c. 60	Destruction of Dwelling Houses (Ireland) Act 1826	An Act passed in the same Year, intituled An Act to prevent the wilful and malicious Destruction of Dwelling Houses in Ireland.	The whole act. (Note: This Act was not included in the Criminal Statutes Repeal Act 1827.)
7 G. 4. c. 69	Stealing from Gardens Act 1826	An Act passed in the same Year, intituled An Act to amend the Law in respect to the Offence of stealing from Gardens and Hothouses.	The whole act.
7 & 8 G. 4. c. 32	Destruction of Dwelling Houses (Ireland) Act 1827	An Act passed in the Session of Parliament holden in the Seventh and Eighth Years of His present Majesty's Reign, to explain and amend the hereinbefore recited Act of the Seventh Year of the Reign of His present Majesty, for preventing the wilful and malicious Destruction of Dwelling Houses in Ireland	The whole act. (Note: This Act was not included in the Criminal Statutes Repeal Act 1827.)

== See also ==
- Statute Law Revision Act
