= Malicious Injuries to Property Act 1827 =

Act of the Parliament of the United Kingdom

- Act of Parliament
- Parliament of the United Kingdom
- Long title: An Act for consolidating and amending the Laws in England relative to malicious Injuries to Property.
- Citation: 7 & 8 Geo. 4. c. 30
- Territorial extent: England and Wales (Note: Section 42.)

Dates
- Royal assent: 21 June 1827
- Commencement: 1 July 1827 (Note: Section 1.)
- Repealed: 1 November 1861
Other legislation
Amended by	Landlord and Tenant Law Amendment (Ireland) Act 1860
Repealed by	Criminal Statutes Repeal Act 1861
Relates to	Peel's Acts; Criminal Statutes Repeal Act 1827; Criminal Law (Ireland) Act 1828; Malicious Injuries to Property (Ireland) Act 1828; Criminal Law (India) Act 1828; Criminal Law Consolidation Acts 1861

Status: Repealed

Text of statute as originally enacted

The Malicious Injuries to Property Act 1827 (7 & 8 Geo. 4. c. 30) or the Malicious Injuries to Property (England) Act 1827 was an act of the Parliament of the United Kingdom that consolidated enactments relating to malicious injuries to property in England and Wales.

The act was one of Peel's Acts which consolidated, repealed and replaced a large number of existing statutes. The enactments replaced by the act were repealed by the Criminal Statutes Repeal Act 1827 (7 & 8 Geo. 4. c. 27).

Similar provisions were made for Ireland by the Malicious Injuries to Property (Ireland) Act 1828 (9 Geo. 4. c. 56).

== Background ==
In the United Kingdom, acts of Parliament remain in force until expressly repealed. Blackstone's Commentaries on the Laws of England, published in the late 18th-century, raised questions about the system and structure of the common law and the poor drafting and disorder of the existing statute book.

In 1806, the Commission on Public Records passed a resolution requesting the production of a report on the best mode of reducing the volume of the statute book. From 1810 to 1825, The Statutes of the Realm was published, providing for the first time the authoritative collection of acts. In 1816, both Houses of Parliament, passed resolutions that an eminent lawyer with 20 clerks be commissioned to make a digest of the statutes, which was declared "very expedient to be done." However, this was never done.

In 1822, Sir Robert Peel entered the cabinet as home secretary and in 1826 introduced a number of reforms to the English criminal law, which became known as Peel's Acts. This included efforts to modernise, consolidate and repeal provisions from a large number of earlier statutes, including:

- Benefit of Clergy
- Larceny and other Offences of Stealing
- Burglary, Robbery and Threats for the Purpose of Robbery or of Extortion
- Embezzlement, False Pretences, and the Receipt of Stolen Property
- Malicious Injuries to Property
- Remedies against the Hundred

== Provisions ==
=== Apprehension without a warrant ===
All those committing an offence under the act could be apprehended without a warrant by the property's owner, his or her servant, anyone authorised by the owner or any "Peace Officer" (section 28). All its provisions applied whether or not it was committed from malice against the property's owner (section 25) and to principals in the first and second degrees and all accessories (section 26). Prosecutions were to be brought within three months of the offence (section 29). Any of its provisions from imprisonment could also be upgraded to hard labour (section 27). The Act also outlined the summoning of offenders (sections 30–31) and the administration of its punishments (sections 32–33), pardons, discharges, convictions and appeals under it (sections 34–39), record-keeping of convictions (section 40) and where and how such offences were to be tried (section 41).

=== Death penalty for setting fire ===
It instituted the death penalty for maliciously setting fire to homes, workplaces, granaries and both Anglican and Dissenting churches and chapels (sections 2 and 8) and for setting fire to a ship, wrecking by false lights and destroying shipwrecked cargo (sections 9 and 11). However, damage to a ship by means other than fire (section 10) or damage to rivers, canals, harbours or sea defences (section 12) only brought imprisonment or transportation.

=== Punishments for the Luddites ===
The act also responded to the Luddites and their hostility to the Industrial Revolution and Agricultural Revolution, setting penalties of transportation or imprisonment for damaging textile goods and factory or farm machinery, with the addition of public or private whipping for male offenders (sections 3–4). Similar punishments were put in place for flooding or setting fire to coal mines and their associated machinery and structures, unless this was done accidentally in working a neighbouring mine (sections 5–7). It also covered damage to public bridges, turnpike gates and toll houses (sections 13–14), dams, fishponds and millponds (section 15), cattle, crops, hay, hops and fruit (sections 16–22) and fences, walls, stiles and gates (section 23). The act also instituted compensation for offences to property not covered by its other sections (section 24).

== Subsequent developments ==
In 1827, Peel's Acts were passed to modernise, consolidate and repeal provisions of the criminal law of England and Wales, including:

- The Criminal Statutes Repeal Act 1827 (7 & 8 Geo. 4. c. 27), which repealed over 140 enactments relating to the criminal law.
- The Criminal Law Act 1827 (7 & 8 Geo. 4. c. 28), which modernised the administration of criminal justice.
- The Larceny Act 1827 (7 & 8 Geo. 4. c. 29), which consolidated enactments relating to larceny.
- The Malicious Injuries to Property Act 1827 (7 & 8 Geo. 4. c. 30), which consolidated enactments relating to malicious injuries to property.
- The Remedies Against the Hundred (England) Act 1827 (7 & 8 Geo. 4. c. 31), which consolidated enactments relating to remedies against the hundred.

In 1828, parallel bills for Ireland to Peel's Acts were introduced, becoming:

- The Criminal Statutes (Ireland) Repeal Act 1828 (9 Geo. 4. 54), which repealed for Ireland over 140 enactments relating to the English criminal law.
- The Criminal Law (Ireland) Act 1828 (9 Geo. 4. 54), which modernised the administration of criminal justice
- The Larceny (Ireland) Act 1828 (9 Geo. 4. c. 55) which consolidated provisions in the law relating to larceny.
- The Malicious Injuries to Property (Ireland) Act 1828 (9 Geo. 4. c. 56), which consolidated provisions in the law relating to malicious injuries to property.

In 1828, the Offences Against the Person Act 1828 (9 Geo. 4. c. 31) was passed, which consolidated enactments relating to offences against the person and repealed for England and Wales almost 60 related enactments. In 1829, the Offences Against the Person (Ireland) Act 1829 (10 Geo. 4. c. 34) was passed, which consolidated enactments relating to offences against the person and repealed for Ireland almost 60 enactments relating to the criminal law of Ireland.

In 1861, bills were introduced, drafted by Charles Sprengel Greaves to mirror Peel's Acts, to consolidate and modernise the criminal law across:

- Offences Against the Person
- Malicious Injuries to Property
- Larceny
- Forgery
- Coining
- Accessories and Abettors

In 1861, the Criminal Consolidation Acts were passed for that purpose:

- The Accessories and Abettors Act 1861 (24 & 25 Vict. c. 94), which modernised provisions in the law relating to Aiding and abetting.
- The Criminal Statutes Repeal Act 1861 (24 & 25 Vict. c. 95), which repealed for England and Wales and Ireland over 100 enactments relating to the criminal law.
- The Larceny Act 1861 (24 & 25 Vict. c. 96), which modernised provisions in the law relating to larceny.
- The Malicious Damage Act 1861 (24 & 25 Vict. c. 97), which modernised provisions in the law relating to malicious injury to property.
- The Forgery Act 1861 (24 & 25 Vict. c. 98), which modernised provisions in the law relating to forgery.
- The Coinage Offences Act 1861 (24 & 25 Vict. c. 99), which modernised provisions in the law relating to coinage.
- The Offences Against the Person Act 1861 (24 & 25 Vict. c. 100), which modernised provisions in the law relating to offences against the person.

=== Repeal ===
So much of the Irish act as related to the jurisdiction of Justices of the Peace as to summary convictions was repealed by section 60 of the Summary Jurisdiction (Ireland) Act 1850 (13 & 14 Vict. c. 102), which came into force on 1 October 1850.

Sections 25–29 of the act were repealed by section 104 of, and schedule (B.) to, the Landlord and Tenant Law Amendment (Ireland) Act 1860 (23 & 24 Vict. c. 154), which came into force on 1 January 1861.

The whole of the English and Irish acts were repealed by section 1 of, and the schedule to, the Criminal Statutes Repeal Act 1861 (24 & 25 Vict. c. 95), which came into force on 1 November 1861.
