= Joseph Colony =

Christian town in Lahore

- Neighbourhood
- Interactive map of Joseph Colony
- Coordinates: 31°36′14″N 74°19′54″E
- Country: Pakistan
- Province: Punjab
- District: Lahore
- City: Lahore
- Police jurisdiction: Badami Bagh Police
- Time zone: UTC+5 (PST)

Joseph Colony is a Christian neighborhood, within the jurisdiction of Badami Bagh Police, located in Lahore, Pakistan.

== History ==
On March 9, 2013, Joseph Colony experienced a widespread violence. This was triggered by an unverified blasphemy allegation against a local Christian individual. The disorder resulted in significant property damage, with over 100 houses reportedly ransacked and burned. The residents, including children, were forced to evacuate. Police records confirm that at least 25 houses were incinerated. The extent of the damage was comprehensive, encompassing every house in the area, with evidence of broken and burnt windows, as well as looted property.
