= People v. Sattlekau =

People v. Sattlekau, Supreme Court of New York, Appellate Division, 12 App. Div. 42, 104 N.Y.S. 805 (1907), is a criminal case that established that if one false representation is plead in the indictment, at trial, evidence of other false representations would be admissible, and for its holding that the misrepresentations as to material facts need not be only false representations about actual facts, used in the inducement to the reliance, but may also include false promises and intentions as to the future. Previously, only actual material facts, not intentions or promises as to the future, were allowed as to proof of fraud. It is also widely known for the court holding that that three key elements of false pretenses were intent to defraud, a material misrepresentation of fact, and the victim's reliance on the misrepresentation. Sattlekau used false representations to get a woman to loan him money that he never intended to repay. Sattlekau's false representations included false statement about actual facts, and other false statements that were promises and intentions about the future. The false statements included that he owned a hotel, that there was a fire, a promise to return the loan, and that he intended to marry her.
