= Peel's Acts =

Peel's Acts (as they are commonly known) were Acts of the Parliament of the United Kingdom. They consolidated provisions from a large number of earlier statutes which were then repealed. Their purpose was to simplify the criminal law. The term refers to the Home Secretary who sponsored them, Sir Robert Peel.

Some writers apply the term Peel's Acts to the series of acts passed between 1826 and 1832. Other writers apply the term Peel's Acts specifically to five of those acts, namely chapters 27 to 31 of the session 7 & 8 Geo. 4 (1827).

According to some writers, the Criminal Law Act 1826 (7 Geo. 4. c. 64) was the first of Peel's Acts.

The acts were the product of a failed attempt to codify the criminal law.

== Background ==
In the United Kingdom, acts of Parliament remain in force until expressly repealed. Blackstone's Commentaries on the Laws of England, published in the late 18th-century, raised questions about the system and structure of the common law and the poor drafting and disorder of the existing statute book.

In 1806, the Commission on Public Records passed a resolution requesting the production of a report on the best mode of reducing the volume of the statute book. From 1810 to 1825, The Statutes of the Realm was published, providing for the first time the authoritative collection of acts. In 1816, both Houses of Parliament passed resolutions that an eminent lawyer with 20 clerks be commissioned to make a digest of the statutes, which was declared "very expedient to be done". However, this was never done.

In 1822, Sir Robert Peel entered the cabinet as home secretary and in 1826 introduced a number of reforms to the English criminal law, which became known as Peel's Acts. This included efforts to modernise, consolidate and repeal provisions from a large number of earlier statutes, including:

- Benefit of clergy
- Larceny and other offences of stealing
- Burglary, robbery and threats for the purpose of robbery or of extortion
- Embezzlement, false pretences, and the receipt of stolen property
- Malicious injuries to property
- Remedies against the hundred

== The acts 7 & 8 Geo. 4. cc. 27 to 31 ==
These acts are:

- The Criminal Statutes Repeal Act 1827 (7 & 8 Geo. 4. c. 27)
- The Criminal Law Act 1827 (7 & 8 Geo. 4. c. 28)
- The Larceny Act 1827 (7 & 8 Geo. 4. c. 29)
- The Malicious Injuries to Property Act 1827 (7 & 8 Geo. 4. c. 30)
- The Remedies against the Hundred Act 1827 (7 & 8 Geo. 4. c. 31), also called the Riot Act 1827

Similar provisions were made for Ireland:

- The Criminal Statutes (Ireland) Repeal Act 1828 (9 Geo. 4. c. 53)
- The Criminal Law (Ireland) Act 1828 (9 Geo. 4. c. 54)
- The Larceny (Ireland) Act 1828 (9 Geo. 4. c. 55)
- The Malicious Injuries to Property (Ireland) Act 1828 (9 Geo. 4. c. 56)

== The acts replaced by the Criminal Law Consolidation Acts 1861 ==
James Edward Davis said that the Criminal Law Consolidation Acts 1861 are new editions of Peel's Acts. The acts listed below were replaced by the Criminal Law Consolidation Acts 1861. There were two separate sets of broadly identical acts for England and Ireland respectively.

The first four acts on this list consolidated 316 acts, representing almost four-fifths of all offences.

=== England ===
- The Criminal Statutes Repeal Act 1827 (7 & 8 Geo. 4. c. 27) (48 statutes)
- The Larceny Act 1827 (7 & 8 Geo. 4. c. 29) (92 statutes)
- The Malicious Injuries to Property Act 1827 (7 & 8 Geo. 4. c. 30) (effectively replacing the statutes abolished by c. 27 and c. 29)
- The Offences against the Person Act 1828 (9 Geo. 4. c. 31) (56 statutes)
- The Forgery Act 1830 (11 Geo. 4 & 1 Will. 4. c. 66) (120 statutes)
- The Coinage Offences Act 1832 (2 & 3 Will. 4. c. 34)

=== Ireland ===
- The Criminal Statutes (Ireland) Repeal Act 1828 (9 Geo. 4. c 53)
- 9 Geo. 4. c. 55, sometimes referred to as the Larceny Act 1828 or the Larceny (Ireland) Act 1828
- 9 Geo. 4. c. 56, sometimes referred to as the Malicious Injuries to Property Act 1828 or the Malicious Injuries to Property (Ireland) Act 1828
- 10 Geo. 4. c. 34, sometimes referred to as the Offences Against the Person (Ireland) Act 1829 and as the Offences Against the Person Act (Ireland) 1829

== Sources ==
- John Frederick Archbold. Peel's Acts, and all the other Criminal Statutes passed from the First Year of the Reign of George IV to the Present Time. Third Edition. Saunders and Benning. Fleet Street, London. 1835. Volume 1.
- John Frederick Archbold. Peel's Acts. William Benning. London. 1828. Google Books: Peel's Acts, with the Forms of Indictments, Etc., and the Evidence Necessary to Support Them Peel's Acts, with the Forms of Indictments, Etc., and the Evidence Necessary to Support Them.
- An Alphabetical Arrangement of Mr. Peel's Acts, Lord Lansdowne's Act, &c. &c. Second Edition. J & W T Clarke. Portugal Street, Lincoln's Inn, London. 1830. Google Books: An Alphabetical Arrangement of Mr Peel's Acts, Lord Lansdowne's Act, &c. &c. ... and other enactments relating to the criminal law ... Second edition ... By a Barrister. [i.e. John Frederick Archbold.] An Alphabetical Arrangement of Mr. Peel's Acts, Lord Lansdowne's Act, Etc., Etc., Relating to the Better Administration of Criminal Justice, the Consolidation of Larceny; Malicious Injuries to Property; the Regulation of Remedies Against the Hundred; the Consolidation of Offenses Against the Person; and the New Acts Relating to Poaching, Smuggling, and Setting Spring Guns, Etc., and Other Statutes Relating to the Criminal Law. With Explanatory Notes, Forms of Indictments, and the Evidence in Support of Each Indictment An Alphabetical Arrangement of Mr. Peel's Acts, Lord Lansdowne's Act, Etc., Etc., Relating to the Better Administration of Criminal Justice, the Consolidation of Larceny; Malicious Injuries to Property; the Regulation of Remedies Against the Hundred; the Consolidation of Offenses Against the Person; and the New Acts Relating to Poaching, Smuggling, and Setting Spring Guns, Etc., and Other Statutes Relating to the Criminal Law. With Explanatory Notes, Forms of Indictments, and the Evidence in Support of Each Indictment.
- An Alphabetical Arrangement of Mr. Peel's Acts. Printed for J & W T Clarke. Portugal Street, Lincoln's Inn, London. 1827 Google Books.
- Isaac Espinasse. The Five Acts called Mr. Peel's Acts. London. 1827. The Five Acts Called Mr. Peel's Acts (7 and 8 Geo. IV. C. 27, 28, 29, 30, 31,) Reduced to Distinct Heads, and Adapted to the Arrangement of Burn's Justice
- George Pyne Andrewes. An Abridgement of Mr. Peel's five important Acts of Parliament just passed for the improvement of the Criminal Law. London. 1827. Catalogue.
- The Late Acts of Parliament amending the Criminal Law of England, commonly called Peel's Acts. James Ross. Hobart Town. 1830. Catalogue. Bibliography.
- John Tidd Pratt. A Collection of the late Statutes, passed for the Administration of Criminal Justice in England; comprising 7 Geo. IV., Cap. 64, 7 & 8 Geo. IV., Cap. 18, 27, 28, 29, 30 & 31. Second Edition. W Benning. Fleet Street, London. 1827. Google Books.
- The Six Acts Passed in the Seventh and Eighth Years of the Reign of His Present Majesty for Further Improving the Administration of Criminal Justice in England. Edward Dunn and Son. Fleet Street, London. 1827. Google Books.
- The Annual Register . . . of the Year 1827, pages 185 to 187.
- William C M'Dermott. The Criminal Code for Ireland, as amended by the late Enactments. Printed for John Cumming. Dublin. 1829. Google Books.
