= Malicious Injuries to Property (Ireland) Act 1828 =

Act of the Parliament of the United Kingdom

- Act of Parliament
- Parliament of the United Kingdom
- Long title: An Act for consolidating and amending the Laws in Ireland relative to malicious Injuries to Property.
- Citation: 9 Geo. 4. c. 56
- Territorial extent: Ireland (Note: Section 54.)

Dates
- Royal assent: 15 July 1828
- Commencement: 1 September 1828 (Note: Section 1.)
- Repealed: 1 November 1861
Other legislation
Amended by	Summary Jurisdiction (Ireland) Act 1850; Landlord and Tenant Law Amendment (Ireland) Act 1860
Repealed by	Criminal Statutes Repeal Act 1861
Relates to	Peel's Acts; Criminal Statutes (Ireland) Repeal Act 1828; Criminal Law (Ireland) Act 1828; Larceny (Ireland) Act 1828; Malicious Injuries to Property Act 1827; Criminal Law Consolidation Acts 1861

Status: Repealed

Text of statute as originally enacted

The Malicious Injuries to Property (Ireland) Act 1828 (9 Geo. 4. c. 56) was an act of the Parliament of the United Kingdom that consolidated enactments relating to malicious injuries to property in Ireland.

== Background ==
In the United Kingdom, acts of Parliament remain in force until expressly repealed, and by the early nineteenth century the accumulated and disordered state of the statute book had become a recognised problem of law reform. In 1822 Sir Robert Peel became Home Secretary, and in 1826 he introduced a programme of reforms to the criminal law, which became known as Peel's Acts. These modernised, consolidated and repealed provisions from a large number of earlier statutes, on subjects including benefit of clergy, larceny, burglary and robbery, embezzlement and false pretences, malicious injuries to property, and remedies against the hundred.

In 1827 corresponding acts were passed for England and Wales, including the Malicious Injuries to Property Act 1827 (7 & 8 Geo. 4. c. 30), which consolidated the law relating to malicious injuries to property, and the Criminal Statutes Repeal Act 1827 (7 & 8 Geo. 4. c. 27), which repealed the earlier enactments it replaced. In 1828 parallel bills were introduced to extend the same programme of reform to Ireland, becoming the Criminal Statutes (Ireland) Repeal Act 1828, the Criminal Law (Ireland) Act 1828, the Larceny (Ireland) Act 1828, and the Malicious Injuries to Property (Ireland) Act 1828, which received royal assent on 15 July 1828.

== Provisions ==
The act extended only to Ireland, and not to England, Wales, or Scotland, and came into force there on 1 September 1828. (Note: Section 1.)

Sections 2 to 11 created felonies, several of them capital, for malicious damage to buildings, mines and ships. Unlawfully and maliciously setting fire to a dwelling house, stable, outhouse, warehouse, mill, barn, or church or other place of religious worship (section 2), to a coal or cannel coal mine (section 6), or to a ship or vessel (section 9), and killing or maiming cattle (section 17) or setting fire to a stack of corn, grain, hay, coal, turf or wood (section 18), were made felonies punishable by death. Flooding or otherwise damaging a mine or its engines and machinery (sections 7 and 8), damaging a ship other than by fire (section 10), and exhibiting a false signal to endanger a ship or plundering or impeding the rescue of persons from a ship in distress or wrecked (section 11, itself punishable by death), were also made felonies, generally punishable at the court's discretion by transportation for life or a term of years, or imprisonment, with public or private whipping for male offenders.

Sections 3 to 5 penalised, by transportation, the malicious cutting, breaking or destruction of silk, woollen, linen, mohair or cotton goods and the frames, looms and other machinery used to manufacture them, and of threshing machines and other agricultural machinery, reflecting contemporary unrest among Irish textile and agricultural workers.

Further sections created felonies, generally punishable by transportation, for breaking down or otherwise damaging a sea bank, river bank, canal, lock, sluice, floodgate or other work on a navigable river or canal (sections 12 and 13), for destroying a public bridge (section 14), and for breaking down the dam of a fishpond, private water or millpond (section 16). Destroying a turnpike gate or toll house was made a misdemeanour (section 15). Sections 19 and 20 made it a felony to destroy trees, saplings, shrubs or underwood by night, or by day where the value of the damage exceeded five pounds, with lesser daytime damage triable summarily before a justice of the peace (section 20). Damage to garden produce (section 21), cultivated roots and plants (section 22), and fences, walls, stiles and gates (section 23) was punishable summarily on a graduated scale, with felony on a second conviction for the more serious offences.

Sections 24 to 29 addressed the fraudulent or malicious pulling down or wasting of a dwelling house or other building held under a lease or agreement, including a summary procedure by which an owner, lessor or landlord who suspected a tenant or occupier of intending such waste could, on affidavit before a justice of the peace, obtain a cautionary notice restraining the tenant from proceeding without licence.

Section 31 preserved the effect of four earlier Acts of the Parliament of Ireland concerned with tumultuous risings, outrage, and violence against the corn trade: 11 Geo. 3. c. 7 (I), 15 & 16 Geo. 3. c. 21 (I), 23 & 24 Geo. 3. c. 20 (I), and 27 Geo. 3. c. 15 (I). Sections 32 and 33 provided that the act's provisions applied whether or not an offence was committed from malice against the owner of the property, and applied the ordinary law of principals and accessories to felonies and misdemeanours committed under the act.

The remaining sections made general provision for the summary trial of offences before justices of the peace, with no conviction removable by certiorari to a superior court (section 51), appeals to quarter sessions (section 50), the transmission of convictions to quarter sessions and their evidential effect in later proceedings (section 52), a six-month limitation period, venue, notice of action and general-issue defence for actions against persons acting under the act (section 53), and the accounting and publication of fines, forfeitures and penalties recovered under the act, which were applied for the benefit of county infirmaries or, in their absence, other public charities (sections 40 to 42). Section 54 provided that nothing in the act extended to Great Britain, and section 55 applied the act to felonies and misdemeanours committed within the jurisdiction of the Admiralty of Ireland.

== Subsequent developments ==
So much of the act as related to the jurisdiction of justices of the peace as to summary convictions was repealed by section 60 of the Summary Jurisdiction (Ireland) Act 1850 (13 & 14 Vict. c. 102), which came into force on 1 October 1850.

Sections 25 to 29 of the act were repealed by section 104 of, and schedule (B.) to, the Landlord and Tenant Law Amendment (Ireland) Act 1860 (23 & 24 Vict. c. 154), which came into force on 1 January 1861.

The whole act was repealed by section 1 of, and the schedule to, the Criminal Statutes Repeal Act 1861 (24 & 25 Vict. c. 95), which came into force on 1 November 1861.
