= Larceny (Ireland) Act 1828 =

Act of the Parliament of the United Kingdom

- Act of Parliament
- Parliament of the United Kingdom
- Long title: An Act for consolidating and amending the Laws in Ireland relative to Larceny, and other Offences connected therewith.
- Citation: 9 Geo. 4. c. 55
- Territorial extent: Ireland (Note: Section 75.)

Dates
- Royal assent: 15 July 1828
- Commencement: 1 September 1828 (Note: Section 1.)
- Repealed: 1 November 1861
Other legislation
Amended by	Criminal Law Act 1833; Summary Jurisdiction (Ireland) Act 1850
Repealed by	Criminal Statutes Repeal Act 1861
Relates to	Larceny Act 1827; Criminal Statutes (Ireland) Repeal Act 1828; Criminal Law (Ireland) Act 1828; Malicious Injuries to Property (Ireland) Act 1828

Status: Repealed

Text of statute as originally enacted

The Larceny (Ireland) Act 1828 (9 Geo. 4. c. 55) was an act of the Parliament of the United Kingdom that consolidated enactments related to larceny in Ireland.

== Background ==
The act was one of Peel's Acts, a series of reforms to the criminal law introduced from 1826 by Sir Robert Peel as Home Secretary, which modernised, consolidated and repealed provisions from a large number of earlier statutes. In 1827, corresponding legislation for England had been passed as the Larceny Act 1827 (7 & 8 Geo. 4. c. 29), together with the Criminal Statutes Repeal Act 1827 (c. 27), which repealed the enactments it consolidated.

In 1828, parallel legislation was introduced for Ireland. The act consolidated and amended the law of Ireland relating to larceny and connected offences, corresponding to the Larceny Act 1827. The enactments it replaced were repealed by the Criminal Statutes (Ireland) Repeal Act 1828 (9 Geo. 4. c. 53), which was passed on the same day and which repealed more than 140 earlier Irish enactments relating to bail in cases of felony, criminal procedure, benefit of clergy, larceny and malicious injuries to property. Two related acts were passed for Ireland at the same time: the Criminal Law (Ireland) Act 1828 (c. 54), which modernised the administration of criminal justice, and the Malicious Injuries to Property (Ireland) Act 1828 (c. 56), which consolidated the law relating to malicious injuries to property.

== Subsequent developments ==
So much of the act as related to the jurisdiction of justices of the peace as to summary convictions was repealed by section 60 of the Summary Jurisdiction (Ireland) Act 1850 (13 & 14 Vict. c. 102), which came into force on 14 August 1850, the date of the passing of that act.

The whole act was repealed by section 1 of, and the schedule to, the Criminal Statutes Repeal Act 1861 (24 & 25 Vict. c. 95), which came into force on 1 November 1861. The corresponding English act, the Larceny Act 1827, was repealed by the same section and schedule, taking effect on the same day.
