= Offence against the person =

Crime that typically involves force or harm upon the person of another

In criminal law, the term offence against the person or crime against the person usually refers to a crime which is committed by direct physical harm or force being applied to another person.

They are usually analysed by division into the following categories:

- Fatal offences
- Sexual offences
- Non-fatal non-sexual offences

They can be further analysed by division into:

- Assaults
- Injuries

And it is then possible to consider degrees and aggravations, and distinguish between intentional actions (e.g., assault) and criminal negligence (e.g., criminal endangerment).

Offences against the person are usually taken to comprise:

- Fatal offences
  - Murder
  - Manslaughter
  - Assassination
- Non-fatal non-sexual offences
  - Assault, or common assault
  - Battery, or common battery
  - Impersonator
  - Wounding or wounding with intent
  - Poisoning
  - Assault occasioning actual bodily harm (and derivative offences)
  - Inflicting grievous bodily harm or causing grievous bodily harm with intent (and derivative offences)

These crimes are usually grouped together in common law countries as a legacy of the Offences against the Person Act 1861.

Although most sexual offences will also be offences against the person, for various reasons (including sentencing and registration of offenders) sexual crimes are usually categorised separately. Similarly, although many homicides also involve an offence against the person, they are usually categorised under the more serious category.

== United Kingdom ==
=== England and Wales ===
==== Fatal offences ====
- Murder
- Manslaughter
- Corporate manslaughter, contrary to section 1 of the Corporate Manslaughter and Corporate Homicide Act 2007
- Infanticide, contrary to section 1(1) of the Infanticide Act 1938

In section 2(2) of the Law Reform (Year and a Day Rule) Act 1996, "fatal offence" means:

- murder, manslaughter, infanticide or any other offence of which one of the elements is causing a person's death;
- an offence under section 2(1) of the Suicide Act 1961 in connection with the death of a person; or
- an offence under section 5 of the Domestic Violence, Crime and Victims Act 2004.

==== Non-fatal non-sexual offences ====
- Assault, or common assault
- Battery, or common battery

For offences of aggravated assault, see Assault#England and Wales

- Administering poison, so as to endanger life, contrary to section 23 of the Offences against the Person Act 1861
- Administering poison, contrary to section 24 of the Offences against the Person Act 1861
- Unlawful wounding or inflicting grievous bodily harm, contrary to section 20 of the Offences against the Person Act 1861
- Wounding or causing grievous bodily harm with intent, contrary to section 18 of the Offences against the Person Act 1861

=== Visiting Forces Act 1952 ===
The expression "offence against the person" is used as a term of art in section 3 of the Visiting Forces Act 1952 (15 & 16 Geo.6 & 1 Eliz.2 c.67) and is defined for that purpose by paragraphs 1 (England and Wales and Northern Ireland) and 2 (Scotland) of the Schedule to that Act.

==== England and Wales and Northern Ireland ====
In the application of section 3 of the 1952 Act to England and Wales and Northern Ireland it means any of the following offences:

- murder, manslaughter, torture, robbery and assault and any offence of aiding, abetting, counselling or procuring suicide or an attempt to commit suicide
- any offence not falling within the foregoing bullet point, being an offence punishable under any of the following enactments:
  - the Offences against the Person Act 1861, except section 57 (which relates to bigamy)
  - the Criminal Law Amendment Act 1885
  - the Punishment of Incest Act 1908
  - sections 1 to 5 and section 11 of the Children and Young Persons Act 1933, and sections 11, 12, 14 to 16, and 21 of the Children and Young Persons Act (Northern Ireland) 1950
  - the Infanticide Act 1938 and the Infanticide Act (Northern Ireland) 1939
  - article 3(1)(a) of the Protection of Children (Northern Ireland) Order 1978
  - section 1(1)(a) of the Protection of Children Act 1978
  - the Child Abduction Act 1984
  - the Female Genital Mutilation Act 2003
  - the Child Abduction (Northern Ireland) Order 1985
  - Part 1 of the Sexual Offences Act 2003
  - the Sexual Offences (Northern Ireland) Order 2008
- an offence of making such a threat as is mentioned in subsection (3)(a) of section 1 of the Internationally Protected Persons Act 1978 and any of the following offences against a protected person within the meaning of that section, namely an offence of kidnapping, an offence of false imprisonment and an offence under section 2 of the Explosive Substances Act 1883 of causing an explosion likely to endanger life
- an offence under section 2 of the Nuclear Material (Offences) Act 1983, where the circumstances are that either in the case of a contravention of subsection (2), the act falling within paragraph (a) or (b) of that subsection, had it been done, would have constituted an offence falling within sub-paragraph (a) or (b) of this paragraph, or in the case of a contravention of subsection (3) or (4), the act threatened, had it been done, would have constituted such an offence
- an offence of making such a threat as is mentioned in section 3 of the United Nations Personnel Act 1997 and any of the following offences against a UN worker within the meaning of that Act
  - kidnapping
  - false imprisonment
  - an offence under section 2 of the Explosive Substances Act 1883 of causing an explosion likely to endanger life

It formerly included in particular:

- rape and buggery (presumably including at common law)
- offences of rape and buggery under the law of Northern Ireland
- offences punishable under
  - section 89 of the Mental Health Act (Northern Ireland) 1948 (which related to certain offences against mentally defective females)
  - sections 2 to 28 of the Sexual Offences Act 1956
  - section 1 of the Prohibition of Female Circumcision Act 1985

==== Scotland ====
In the application of section 3 of the 1952 Act to Scotland, the expression "offence against the person" means any of the following offences:

- murder, culpable homicide, rape, torture, robbery, assault, incest, sodomy, lewd, indecent and libidinous practices, procuring abortion, abduction, cruel and unnatural treatment of persons, threats to murder or to injure persons
- any offence not falling within the last bullet point, being an offence punishable under any of the following enactments:
  - the Criminal Law Amendment Act 1885
  - section 46 of the Mental Deficiency and Lunacy (Scotland) Act 1913 (which relates to certain offences against mentally defective females)
  - sections 12 to 16 and 22 of the Children and Young Persons (Scotland) Act 1937
  - section 52(1)(a) of the Civic Government (Scotland) Act 1982
- an offence of making such a threat as is mentioned in subsection (3)(a) of section 1 of the Internationally Protected Persons Act 1978 and the following offence against a protected person within the meaning of that section, namely, an offence under section 2 of the Explosive Substances Act 1883 of causing an explosion likely to endanger life
- an offence under section 2 of the Nuclear Material (Offences) Act 1983, where the circumstances are that either, in the case of a contravention of subsection (2), the act falling within paragraph (a) or (b) of that subsection, had it been done, would have constituted an offence falling within sub-paragraph (a) or (b) of this paragraph, or, in the case of a contravention of subsection (3) or (4), the act threatened, had it been done, would have constituted such an offence
- an offence of making such a threat as is mentioned in section 3 of the United Nations Personnel Act 1997 and an offence of causing an explosion likely to endanger life, committed against a UN worker (within the meaning of that Act), under section 2 of the Explosive Substances Act 1883

== United States ==
=== Federal law ===
Most federal crimes in the United States are contained within Title 18 of the United States Code. While the code is divided into multiple parts and multiple chapters, there is no part or chapter titled "crimes against the person," or anything similar thereto. Although there is an absence of a chapter or part with the aforementioned name, the code still does contain provisions for crimes such as murder, rape, and assault, among others, all crimes which are typically considered to be a crime against the person.

=== American Samoa ===
Offences against the person in American Samoan law are contained in Chapter 35 of Title 46 of the annotated code, with the chapter carrying the title "Offenses Against the Person."

=== California ===
Crimes against the person in California law are contained within Title 8 of Part 1 of the California Penal Code, with Title 8 carrying the title "OF CRIMES AGAINST THE PERSON." This title includes sections 187 through 248 inclusive of the Penal Code.

== See also ==
- Offences Against the Person Act
- Property crime
