= Property damage =

Topic in insurance and criminal law

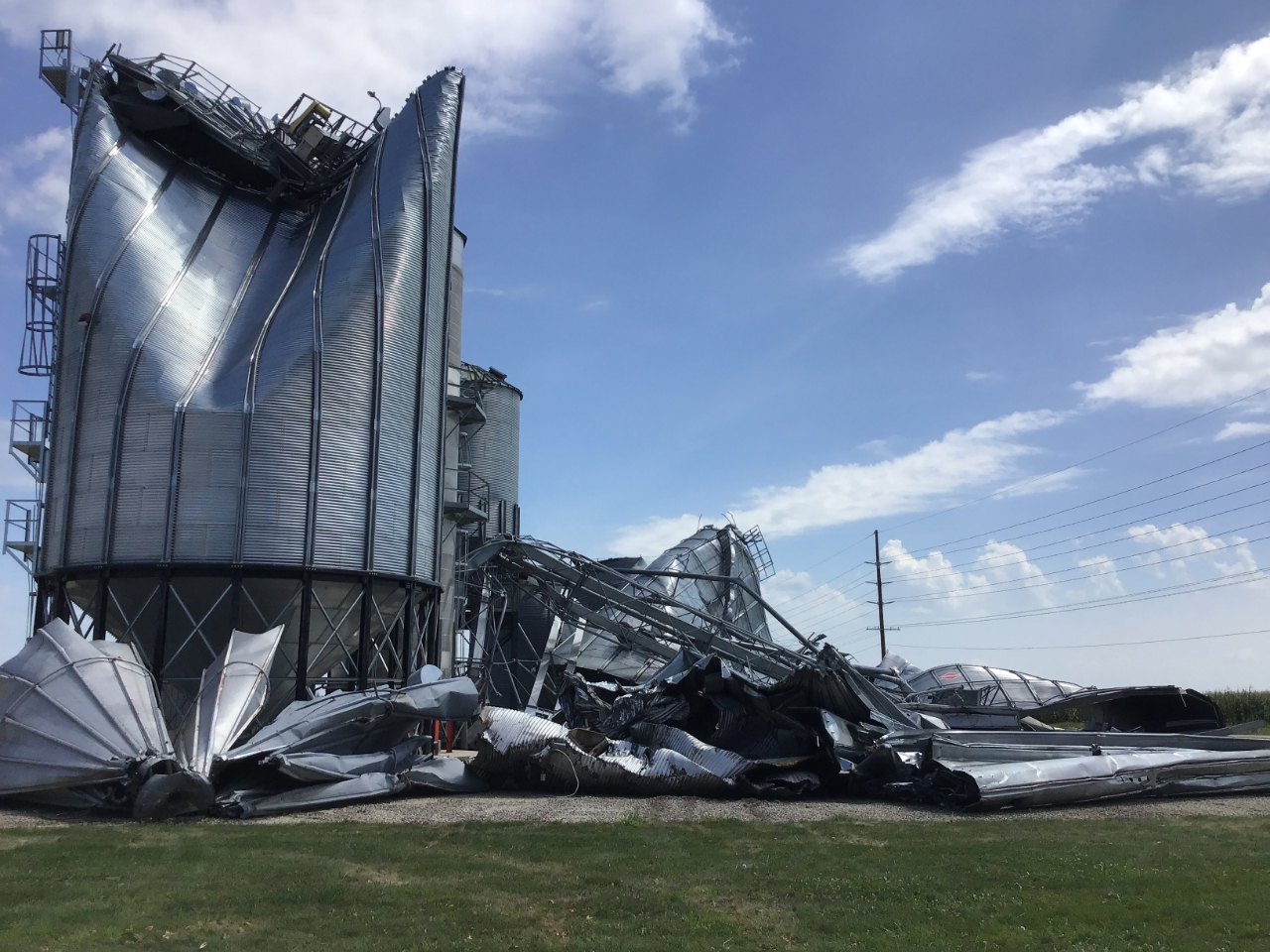
Agricultural storage and processing structures in Marion, Iowa damaged by high winds of the 2020 Midwest derecho

Property damage (sometimes called damage to property) is the damage or destruction of real or tangible personal property, caused by negligence, willful destruction, or an act of nature.

Destruction of property (sometimes called property destruction, or criminal damage in England and Wales) is a subset of property damage that involves damage to property that results from willful misconduct and is punishable as a crime. Destruction of property encompasses vandalism (deliberate damage, destruction, or defacement), building implosion (destroying property with explosives), and arson (destroying property with fire), and similar crimes that involve unlawful infliction of damage to or destruction of personal property or real property.

Courts may also order the destruction of property that infringes intellectual property laws.

== Insurance claims ==
Property damage also refers to loss of tangible property in insurance loss claims, related to residential and commercial buildings, as well as motor vehicles. In motor vehicle accidents, typically there may be loss to structures, personal items, and vehicles, which would be referred to as property damage.

== See also ==
- Mischief
- Damages
