= False pretenses =

Acquisition results from intentional misrepresenting of a past or existing fact

In criminal law, property is obtained by false pretenses when the acquisition results from the intentional misrepresentation of a past or existing fact.

== Elements ==
The elements of false pretenses are:

- a false representation
- of a material past or existing fact
- which the person making the representation knows is false
- made for the purpose of causing
- and which does cause
- the victim to pass title
- to his property

False pretenses is a statutory offense in most jurisdictions; subject matter covered by statute varies accordingly, and is not necessarily limited to tangible personal property - some statutes include intangible personal property and services. For example, the North Carolina false pretense statute applies to obtaining "any money, goods, property, services, choses in action, or any other thing of value ..."

Under common law, false pretense is defined as a representation of a present or past fact, which the thief knows to be false, and which he intends will and does cause the victim to pass title of his property. That is, false pretense is the acquisition of title from a victim by fraud or misrepresentation of a material past or present fact.

=== "A false representation..." ===
There must be a description or portrayal of something that is false. If a person makes a statement about something that he mistakenly believes to be untrue there is no false representation.

For example, if a person represents that the stone in a ring is a diamond when he believes that is in fact made of cubic zirconia, he is not guilty of false pretenses if it turns out that the ring was in fact a diamond. The representation must be false at the time title passes. Thus if the representation was false when made but is true at the time title to the property passes there is no crime.

For example, representing to a seller that you have funds available in your bank account to pay for the goods when in fact your account has a zero balance is not false pretenses if at the time the transaction takes place adequate funds are present in the account. The representation may be oral or written. The misrepresentation has to be affirmative. A failure to disclose a fact does not fit this misrepresentation in common law, unless there is a fiduciary duty between the thief and victim. Moreover, opinion and puffing are not considered misrepresentation as they color the facts but do not misrepresent them.

=== "...of a material past or existing fact..." ===
The representation must relate to a material past or existing fact. A representation concerning a future state of facts is not sufficient. Nor is merely an expression of opinion.

=== "...which the person making the representation knows is false..." ===
A mistaken representation about some past or existing state of facts is not sufficient for false pretense.

=== "...made for the purpose of causing and which does cause..." ===
It is essential that the victim of the false pretenses must actually be deceived by the misrepresentation: the victim must transfer title to the property in reliance on the representation; and the victim being deceived must be a major (if not the only) reason for the victim's transferring title to the defendant.

Simply making a false promise or statement is not sufficient. It is not a defense to false pretenses charge that a reasonable person would not have been deceived by the false representation. No matter how gullible the victim, if they were in fact deceived then the offense has been committed.

On the other hand, the offense requires the victim believe the representation to be true. If the person to whom the representation has been made has doubts or serious misgivings about the truth of the representation but nonetheless goes through with the transaction, they have not been deceived - they have basically assumed the risk of a false representation.

=== "...the victim to pass title to his property." ===
False pretense is conventionally referred to as a crime against "title" and "title" must pass from the victim to the perpetrator for the crime to be complete. However, this is not to be taken literally for the simple reason that a person who obtains ownership of property by deceit does not obtain full title to the property; only a voidable title. False pretense applies to situations where the wrongdoer by deceit obtains "title or ownership – or whatever property interest the victim had in the chattel, if it was less than title." If the victim has an interest is the property less than full title the acquisition of that interest through false representation can be false pretenses unless the only interest the person has is possession of the property. In such case the crime would be larceny by trick rather than false pretenses. Larceny by Trick also applies to situations where the wrongdoer by deceit obtains possession only, with the victim retaining ownership or some superior interest in the chattel. Determining whether the victim obtained title or possession can present problems. Generally a sell or conditional sell is sufficient to pass title for purposes of false pretenses whereas lending property does not involve a transfer of title. Note that if property is falsely obtained for a specific purpose - for example money to buy a car that does not exist - the crime is larceny by trick rather than false pretenses because the victim intended to pass title to the money only upon completion of the transaction; until such time the victim intended to deliver possession only.

The essential distinction between false pretenses and larceny and embezzlement is that false pretenses requires that the victim pass title to the defendant whereas the other offenses do not.

The determination as to whether the offense is larceny or false pretenses can have significant effect on the ability of true owner to reclaim the appropriated property. If false pretenses, a bona fide purchaser for value would acquire title superior to the victim; whereas, if the crime is larceny a purchaser from the wrongdoer, bona fide or otherwise, would not acquire any title to the property and would have to return the property to the victim.

== United States ==
United States statutes on this subject are mainly copied from the English statutes, and the courts there in a general way follow the English interpretations. The statutes of each state must be consulted. Under federal law, obtaining money or property through false pretenses as part of a scheme or artifice to defraud, and using means of interstate commerce such as a telephone, is illegal under title 18 USC section 1343; the crime is usually referred to as "Wire Fraud." There are Federal laws providing penalties for false personation of the lawful owner of public stocks, &c., or of persons entitled to pensions, prize money, &c., or the false making of any order purporting to be a money order.

=== History ===
The first "modern" false pretense statute, the Obtaining Money by False Pretences, etc. Act 1757 (30 Geo. 2. c. 24) was enacted by Parliament in 1757. The statute prohibited obtaining "money, goods, wares, or merchandise" by "false pretence." The first general embezzlement statute, the Embezzlement Act 1799 (39 Geo. 3. c. 85), was enacted by Parliament in 1799. Neither of these statutes were part of the American common law. However, most states passed laws similar to the English statutes.

=== Arizona ===
In Arizona, obtaining money or property by falsely impersonating another is punishable as for larceny. Obtaining credit by false pretenses as to wealth and mercantile character is punishable by six months imprisonment and a fine not exceeding three times the value of the money or property obtained.

=== Illinois ===
In Illinois, whoever by any false representation or writing signed by him, of his own respectability, wealth or mercantile correspondence or connections, obtain; credit and thereby defrauds any person of money, goods, chattels or any valuable thing, or who procures another to make a false report of his honesty, wealth, &c., shall return the money, goods, &c., and be fined and imprisoned for a term not exceeding one year. Obtaining money or property by bogus cheques, the confidence game, or three card monte, sleight of hand, fortune-telling, &c., is punishable by imprisonment for from one to ten years. Obtaining goods from warehouse, mill or wharf by fraudulent receipt wrongly stating amount of goods deposited by imprisonment for not less than one nor more than ten years. Fraudulent use of railroad passes is a misdemeanor. A person who knowingly personates a public official, a veteran, the recipient of a medal, the holder of a title, or profits from a false academic degree is unlawful.

=== Massachusetts ===
In Massachusetts it is simple larceny to obtain by false pretenses the money or personal chattel of another. Obtaining by false pretence the making, acceptance or endorsement of a bill of exchange or promissory note, the release or substitution of collateral or other security, an extension of time for payment of an obligation, or the release or alteration of the obligation of a written contract, is larceny and punishable by imprisonment.

=== New York ===
In New York, obtaining property by false pretenses, felonious breach of trust and embezzlement are included in the term larceny, but the methods of proof required to establish each crime remain as before the code. Obtaining lodging and food on credit at hotel or lodging house with intent to defraud is a misdemeanor. Purchase of property by false pretences as to persons means or ability to pay is not criminal when in writing signed by the party to be charged

== United Kingdom ==
False pretences as a concept in the criminal law is no longer used in English law. It used to refer to the means whereby the defendant obtained any chattel, money or valuable security from any other person with intent to defraud, indictable as a misdemeanour under the Larceny Act 1861 as amended by the Larceny Act 1916. The modern concept is a deception and it is used as the common basis of the actus reus (the Latin for "guilty act") in the deception offences under the Theft Act 1968 and in the Theft Act 1978. The Fraud Act 2006 repealed these latter two acts and replaced deception offences with other offences.

=== History ===
The three major theft offences were larceny, embezzlement and false pretences. Larceny was a common law offence (created by judicial action) while embezzlement and false pretences were statutory offences (created by legislative action). Larceny is by far the oldest. The elements of larceny were "well-settled" by the 13th century. The only other theft offence then existing was cheat which was a misdemeanor. Cheat was a primitive version of the crime of false pretences and involved obtaining property by the use of false weights or measures. In 1541 a statute, the Counterfeit Letters, etc. Act 1541 (33 Hen. 8. c. 1) was enacted by Parliament that made it a misdemeanor to obtain property by a false token or a counterfeit letter "made in any other man's name." This statute did not cover obtaining property by the use false spoken words. The first "modern" false pretence statute, the Obtaining Money by False Pretences, etc. Act 1757 (30 Geo. 2. c. 24), was enacted by Parliament in 1757. The statute prohibited obtaining "money, goods, wares, or merchandise" by "false pretence." The first general embezzlement statute, the Embezzlement Act 1799 (39 Geo. 3. c. 85), was enacted by Parliament in 1799.

The broad distinction between this offence and larceny is that in the former the owner intends to part with his property, in the latter he does not. This offence dates as a statutory crime practically from 1756. At common law the only remedy originally available for an owner who had been deprived of his goods by fraud was an indictment for the crime of cheating, or a civil action for deceit. These remedies were insufficient to cover all cases where money or other properties had been obtained by false pretences, and the offence was first partially created by a statute of Henry VIII, the Counterfeit Letters, etc. Act 1541 (33 Hen. 8. c. 1), which enacted that if any person should falsely and deceitfully obtain any money, goods, etc., by means of any false token or counterfeit letter made in any other man's name, the offender should suffer any punishment other than death, at the discretion of the judge. The scope of the offence was enlarged to include practically all false pretences by the Obtaining Money by False Pretences, etc. Act 1757, the provisions of which were embodied in the Larceny Act 1861.

The pretence must be a false pretence of some existing fact, made for the purpose of inducing the prosecutor to part with his property (e.g. it was held not to be a false pretence to promise to pay for goods on delivery), and it may be by either words or conduct. The property, too, must have been actually obtained by the false pretence. The owner must be induced by the pretence to make over the absolute and immediate ownership of the goods, otherwise it is larceny by means of a trick. It is not always easy, however, to draw a distinction between the various classes of offences. In the case where a man goes into a restaurant and orders a meal, and, after consuming it, says that he has no means of paying for it, it was usual to convict for obtaining food by false pretences. But in R v Jones [1898] 1 QB 119, an English court found that it is neither larceny nor false pretences, but an offence under the Debtors Act 1869, of obtaining credit by fraud.

R v Danger revealed a lacuna in the law. This was remedied by section 90 of the Larceny Act 1861. That section was replaced by section 32(2) of the Larceny Act 1916.

Section 32 of the Larceny Act 1916 read:

Every person who by any false pretence-

(1) with intent to defraud, obtains from any other person any chattel, money, or valuable security, or causes or procures any money to be paid, or any chattel or valuable security to be delivered to himself or to any other person for the use or benefit or on account of himself or any other person; or
(2) with intent to defraud or injure any other person, fraudulently causes or induces any other person-

(a) to execute, make, accept, endorse, or destroy the whole or any part of any valuable security; or
(b) to write, impress, or affix his name or the name of any other person, or the seal of any body corporate or society, upon any paper or parchment in order that the same may be afterwards made or converted into, or used or dealt with as, a valuable security

shall be guilty of a misdemeanour and on conviction thereof liable to penal servitude for any term not exceeding five years.

The offence of obtaining by false pretences, contrary to section 32(1) of the Larceny Act 1916, was replaced by the offence of obtaining property by deception, contrary to section 15 of the Theft Act 1968. Section 32(2) of the Larceny Act 1916 was replaced by section 20(2) of the Theft Act 1968.

== Notes ==
- a: The use of the word "pretenses" here is perhaps slightly confusing to a modern reader since "pretense", in the modern sense of the word, is the conscious creation of fiction, but in the former sense of the word, as it was borrowed from the French language, it simply meant "claim" or sometimes "belief". See also Pretender for another case of confusion on this point. In certain other cases, the distinction between the two definitions affects the meaning only slightly, as in "John pretends to a great knowledge of world history", which to the speaker clearly refers to something untrue, but more in the nature of wishful thinking on the part of John himself than a lie as St Augustine would define it (requiring the liar to be conscious of the untruth).
