= Forgery Act 1837 =

Act of the Parliament of the United Kingdom

Forgery Act 1837 (Note: The citation of the act by this short title was authorised by section 1 of, and the first schedule to, the Short Titles Act 1896. Due to the repeal of those provisions, it is now authorised by section 19(2) of the Interpretation Act 1978.)
- Act of Parliament
- Parliament of the United Kingdom
- Long title: An Act to abolish the Punishment of Death in Cases of Forgery.
- Citation: 7 Will. 4 & 1 Vict. c. 84
- Introduced by: Lord John Russell MP (Commons); Thomas Aitchison-Denman, 2nd Baron Denman (Lords)
- Territorial extent: United Kingdom

Dates
- Royal assent: 17 July 1837
- Commencement: 1 October 1837 (Note: Section 5.)
- Repealed: 21 November 1929
Other legislation
Amends	Forgery Act 1830; Government Annuities Act 1832; Forgery, Abolition of Punishment of Death Act 1832; Loans for Jamaica, Trinidad, etc. Act 1832; Criminal Law Act 1833; Customs, etc. Act 1833; Abolition of Slavery Act 1835; Dominica, etc., Relief Act 1835
Amended by	Criminal Statutes Repeal Act 1861; Statute Law Revision Act 1874
Repealed by	Government Annuities Act 1929
Relates to	Criminal Law Act 1827; Criminal Statutes Repeal Act 1827; Larceny Act 1827; Malicious Injuries to Property Act 1827; Remedies against the Hundred Act 1827; Offences Against the Person Act 1828; Criminal Statutes (Ireland) Repeal Act 1828; Criminal Law (India) Act 1828; Offences Against the Person (Ireland) Act 1829; Coinage Offences Act 1832; Forgery Act 1830; Accessories and Abettors Act 1861; Criminal Statutes Repeal Act 1861; Larceny Act 1861; Malicious Damage Act 1861; Forgery Act 1861; Coinage Offences Act 1861; Offences Against the Person Act 1861

Status: Repealed

History of passage through Parliament

Records of Parliamentary debate relating to the statute from Hansard

Text of statute as originally enacted

The Forgery Act 1837 (7 Will. 4 & 1 Vict. c. 84) was an act of the Parliament of the United Kingdom that abolished the punishment of the death penalty for all offences of forgery, substituting it for transportation or imprisonment.

The act was one of the Acts for the Mitigation of the Criminal Law (7 Will. 4 & 1 Vict. cc. 84–91), which reduced the severity of punishments in the criminal justice system and abolished the death penalty for several offences.

== Background ==
In the United Kingdom, acts of Parliament remain in force until expressly repealed. Blackstone's Commentaries on the Laws of England, published in the late 18th-century, raised questions about the system and structure of the common law and the poor drafting and disorder of the existing statute book.

From 1810 to 1825, The Statutes of the Realm was published, providing the first authoritative collection of acts.

In 1812, William Booth was the last person to be hanged for forgery in England. A public outcry at the harshness of his sentence resulted in the death penalty in England and Wales being reserved for capital crimes, making Booth the last person in England hanged for a non-capital crime.

In 1822, Sir Robert Peel entered the cabinet as home secretary and in 1826 introduced a number of reforms to modernise, consolidate and repeal provisions in English criminal law. In 1827, Peel's Acts were passed for this purpose, territorially limited to England and Wales and Scotland:

- The Criminal Statutes Repeal Act 1827 (7 & 8 Geo. 4. c. 27), which repealed for England and Wales over 140 enactments relating to the criminal law.
- The Criminal Law Act 1827 (7 & 8 Geo. 4. c. 28), which modernised the administration of criminal justice.
- The Larceny Act 1827 (7 & 8 Geo. 4. c. 29), which consolidated provisions in the law relating to larceny.
- The Malicious Injuries to Property Act 1827 (7 & 8 Geo. 4. c. 30), which consolidated provisions in the law relating to malicious injuries to property.
- The Remedies against the Hundred Act 1827 (7 & 8 Geo. 4. c. 31)

In 1828, similar provisions were made for Ireland:

- Criminal Statutes (Ireland) Repeal Act 1828 (9 Geo. 4. 54), which repealed for Ireland over 140 enactments relating to the criminal law.
- Criminal Law (Ireland) Act 1828 (9 Geo. 4. 54), which modernised the administration of criminal justice.
- Larceny (Ireland) Act 1828 (9 Geo. 4. c. 55) which consolidated provisions in the law relating to larceny.
- Malicious Injuries to Property (Ireland) Act 1828 (9 Geo. 4. c. 56), which consolidated provisions in the law relating to malicious injuries to property.

In 1828, the Offences Against the Person Act 1828 (9 Geo. 4. c. 31) was passed, which consolidated provisions in the law relating to offences against the person and repealed for England and Wales almost 60 enactments relating to the criminal law. In 1829, the Offences Against the Person (Ireland) Act 1829 (10 Geo. 4. c. 34) was passed, which consolidated provisions in the law relating to offences against the person and repealed for Ireland almost 60 enactments relating to the Criminal law.

In 1828, the Criminal Law (India) Act 1828 (9 Geo. 4. c. 74) was passed, which repealed for India offences repealed by the Criminal Statutes Repeal Act 1827 (7 & 8 Geo. 4. c. 27) and the Offences Against the Person Act 1828 (9 Geo. 4. c. 31).

In 1830, the Forgery Act 1830 (11 Geo. 4 & 1 Will. 4. c. 66) was passed, which consolidated provisions in the law relating to forgery and repealed for England and Wales over 25 enactments relating to the criminal law.

In 1832, the Coinage Offences Act 1832 (2 & 3 Will. 4. c. 34) was passed, which consolidated provisions in the law relating to the counterfeiting and clipping of coins, repealed for the United Kingdom almost 50 enactments relating to the criminal law, and abolished the punishment of the death penalty for coinage offences.

In 1832, the Forgery, Abolition of Punishment of Death Act 1832 (2 & 3 Will. 4. c. 123) was passed, which abolished the punishment of the death penalty for all offences of forgery, except for forging wills and certain powers of attorney.

In 1837, bills were introduced by the home secretary, Lord John Russell, to reduce the severity of punishments in the criminal justice system and abolish the death penalty for several offences:

- Forgery
- Offences against the person
- Burglary
- Robbery
- Piracy
- Arson
- Solitary confinement
- Death penalty

== Passage ==
Leave to bring in the Forgery Bill was granted to the home secretary, Lord John Russell MP, the attorney general, John Campbell MP and the solicitor general, Robert Rolfe MP, on 23 March 1837. The bill had its first reading in the House of Commons on 10 April 1837, introduced by Lord John Russell MP as part of a wider package of acts to reduce the severity of punishment in the criminal justice system. The bill had its second reading in the House of Commons on 24 April 1837 and was committed to a committee of the whole house. During debate, Sir Robert Peel expressed concerns about the preparedness of the House to discuss the measures, and the effectiveness of secondary punishments including transpiration and imprisonment. The committee which met on 19 May 1837 and reported on 30 May 1837, with amendments. The report was considered on 27 June 1837, and the amended bill had its third reading in the House of Commons on 1 July 1837, without amendments.

The bill had its first reading in the House of Lords on 1 July 1837. The bill had its second reading in the House of Lords on 4 July 1837 and was committed to a committee of the whole house, introduced by Thomas Aitchison-Denman, 2nd Baron Denman. The measures in the bill to reduce capital punishment was supported by Henry Brougham, 1st Baron Brougham and Vaux, but the rushed timeline of the bill was criticised. The committee met on 10 July 1837 and reported on 11 July 1837, with amendments. The amended bill had its third reading in the House of Lords on 11 July 1837, with amendments, and passed on 14 July 1837, with amendments.

The amended bill was considered and agreed to by the House of Commons on 15 July 1837.

The bill was granted royal assent on 17 July 1837.

== Provisions ==
=== Section 1 ===
Section 1 of the act abolished the death penalty for the offences mentioned in the preamble, including:

- Forgery Act 1830 (1 Will. 4. c. 66)
- Government Annuities Act 1832 (2 & 3 Will. 4. c. 59)
- Forgery, Abolition of Punishment of Death Act 1832 (2 & 3 Will. 4. c. 123)
- Loans for Jamaica, Trinidad, etc. Act 1832 (2 & 3 Will. 4. c. 125)
- Abolition of Slavery Act 1835 (5 & 6 Will. 4. c. 45)
- Dominica, etc., Relief Act 1835 (5 & 6 Will. 4. c. 51)

It provided instead that a person convicted of any of those offences after the passing of the act was liable to be transported for life, or for a term not less than seven years, or to be imprisoned for a term not exceeding four years and not less than two years.

=== Section 2 ===
Section 2 of the act repealed parts of several earlier acts relating to forgery, providing that a person convicted of any of those offences after the passing of the act was liable to be transported for life, or for a term not less than seven years, or to be imprisoned for a term not exceeding four years and not less than two years, including:

- Forgery, Abolition of Punishment of Death Act 1832 (2 & 3 Will. 4. c. 123)
- Criminal Law Act 1833 (3 & 4 Will. 4. c. 44)
- Customs, etc. Act 1833 (3 & 4 Will. 4. c. 51) (Note: Section 27.)

=== Section 3 ===
Section 3 of the act provided that persons convicted of offences made punishable by imprisonment could be kept to hard labour and solitary confinement.

=== Section 4 ===
Section 4 of the act provided that the act did not affect the powers conferred by Prisons Act 1835 (5 & 6 Will. 4. c. 38) or Gaols Act 1823 (4 Geo. 4. c. 64).

=== Section 5 ===
Section 5 of the act provided that the act was to come into force on 1 October 1837.

== Subsequent developments ==
The act was one of the Acts for the Mitigation of the Criminal Law (7 Will. 4 & 1 Vict. cc. 84–91), which reduced the severity of punishments in the criminal justice system and abolished the death penalty for several offences:

- The Forgery Act 1837 (7 Will. 4 & 1 Vict. c. 84)
- The Offences Against the Person Act 1837 (7 Will. 4 & 1 Vict. c. 85)
- The Burglary Act 1837 (7 Will. 4 & 1 Vict. c. 86)
- The Robbery from the Person Act 1837 (7 Will. 4 & 1 Vict. c. 87)
- The Piracy Act 1837 (7 Will. 4 & 1 Vict. c. 88)
- The Burning of Buildings, etc. Act 1837 (7 Will. 4 & 1 Vict. c. 89)
- The Solitary Confinement Act 1837 (7 Will. 4 & 1 Vict. c. 90)
- The Punishment of Offences Act 1837 (7 Will. 4 & 1 Vict. c. 91)

In 1861, the Criminal Law Consolidation Acts were passed to further consolidate and modernise the criminal law, drafted by Charles Sprengel Greaves across:

- The Accessories and Abettors Act 1861 (24 & 25 Vict. c. 94)
- The Criminal Statutes Repeal Act 1861 (24 & 25 Vict. c. 95)
- The Larceny Act 1861 (24 & 25 Vict. c. 96)
- The Malicious Damage Act 1861 (24 & 25 Vict. c. 97)
- The Forgery Act 1861 (24 & 25 Vict. c. 98)
- The Coinage Offences Act 1861 (24 & 25 Vict. c. 99)
- The Offences Against the Person Act 1861 (24 & 25 Vict. c. 100)

== Repeal ==
The act was partially repealed by the Criminal Statutes Repeal Act 1861 (24 & 25 Vict. c. 95), specifically:

"So much of Sections One and Two as relates to the forging, altering, offering, uttering, disposing of, or putting off any Will, Testament, Codicil, or Testamentary Writing, or any Power of Attorney, or other Authority therein mentioned, and to Principals in the Second Degree and Accessories before the Fact in such Offences, and so much of Sections Two and Three as relates to the Punishment of any Offence created by or formerly punishable under any Enactment in this Schedule."

The following enactments were repealed by section 1 of, and the schedule to, the Statute Law Revision Act 1874 (37 & 38 Vict. c. 35), which came into force on 16 July 1874.

- So much as relates to the punishment of offences formerly punishable under the Acts 11 Geo. 4. & 1 Will. 4. c. 66., (Note: Cruelty to Animals (Ireland) Act 1837) 1 & 2 Will. 4. c. 45., or 3 & 4 Will. 4. c. 51. (Note: Customs, etc. Act 1833)
- Also, except as to Scotland, so much as relates to the punishment of offences formerly punishable under the Acts 2 & 3 Will. 4. c. 123. (Note: Forgery, Abolition of Punishment of Death Act 1832) or 3 & 4 Will. 4. c. 47. (Note: Court of Bankruptcy (England) Act 1833)
- Section Four from "or in an Act" to the end of that Section
- Section Five.

The whole act was repealed by section 36(1) of, and part I of the second schedule to, the Government Annuities Act 1929 (19 & 20 Geo. 5. c. 29), which came into force on 21 November 1929.

== Bibliography ==
- John Frederick Archbold. "1 Victoria, c. 84". The Recent Criminal Statutes, (1 Victoria, cc. 84 to 91,) with Forms of Indictments, Notes and Index. Shaw & Sons. Fetter Lane, London. 1837. Pages 1 to 16.
- Richard Matthews. "Forgery". The Criminal Law as altered by various Statutes of Will. IV. and 1 Victoria. Alphabetically Arranged. Comprising the New Statutes, New Forms of Indictment, the Evidence necessary to support them, the Punishment in each Case, and an Index. Saunders and Benning. Fleet Street, London. 1837. Pages 86 to 97. See also "Forgery - Abolishing Death in" at pages 209 to 215, and "Punishment" at page 168.
- "The Forgery Act, 1837". Halsbury's Statutes of England. First Edition. Butterworth & Co (Publishers) Ltd. Bell Yard, Temple Bar, London. 1929. Volume 4: . Page 460.
- William Newland Welsby and Edward Beavan. Chitty's Collection of Statutes. Second Edition. S Sweet. London. Hodges and Smith. Dublin. 1851. Volume 2. Title "Criminal Law". Subtitle "Forgery and False Personation". Pages 241 to 243.
- John Tidd Pratt. A Collection of the Public General Statutes passed in the last Session (7 Will. 4 & 1 Vic.) as far as relates to the Office of a Justice of the Peace and to parochial matters, in England and Wales, with Notes, References, and an Index. Shaw & Sons. Fetter Lane, London. 1837. Pages 119 to 125.
- "Abstract of Public General Statutes" (1837) 18 The Law Magazine 487
