= Forgery, Abolition of Punishment of Death Act 1832 =

Act of the Parliament of the United Kingdom

- Act of Parliament
- Parliament of the United Kingdom
- Long title: An Act for abolishing the Punishment of Death in certain Cases of Forgery.
- Citation: 2 & 3 Will. 4. c. 123
- Introduced by: Thomas Denman MP (Commons); Henry Brougham, 1st Baron Brougham and Vaux (Lords)
- Territorial extent: United Kingdom

Dates
- Royal assent: 16 August 1832
- Commencement: 16 August 1832 (Note: The Acts of Parliament (Commencement) Act 1793.)
- Repealed: 1 November 1861
Other legislation
Amends	Forgery Act 1830
Amended by	Forgery Act 1837; Criminal Statutes Repeal Act 1861; Statute Law Revision Act 1874
Repealed by	Criminal Statutes Repeal Act 1861
Relates to	Criminal Law Act 1827; Criminal Statutes Repeal Act 1827; Larceny Act 1827; Malicious Injuries to Property Act 1827; Remedies against the Hundred Act 1827; Offences Against the Person Act 1828; Criminal Statutes (Ireland) Repeal Act 1828; Criminal Law (India) Act 1828; Offences Against the Person (Ireland) Act 1829; Coinage Offences Act 1832; Forgery Act 1830; Forgery Act 1837; Accessories and Abettors Act 1861; Criminal Statutes Repeal Act 1861; Larceny Act 1861; Malicious Damage Act 1861; Forgery Act 1861; Coinage Offences Act 1861; Offences Against the Person Act 1861

Status: Repealed

History of passage through Parliament

Records of Parliamentary debate relating to the statute from Hansard

Text of statute as originally enacted

The Forgery, Abolition of Punishment of Death Act 1832 (2 & 3 Will. 4. c. 123) was an act of the Parliament of the United Kingdom that abolished the death penalty for all offences of forgery, except for forging wills and certain powers of attorney. The exception was abolished in by section 1 of the Forgery Act 1837 (7 Will. 4 & 1 Vict. c. 84).

== Background ==
The act was passed during a period when Parliament was abolishing the death penalty for hundreds of capital crimes. Under English law, there were over 200 offences, many of them minor, for which the mandatory punishment was death; this was known as the Bloody Code. The Judgment of Death Act 1823 (4 Geo. 4 c. 48) made the death penalty discretionary for all crimes except treason and murder. Other acts abolished the death penalty for other categories of crimes, such as the Coinage Offences Act 1832 (2 & 3 Will. 4. c. 34) and the Offences Against the Person Act 1861 (24 & 25 Vict. c. 100).

== Provisions ==
Section 1 of the act abolished the death penalty for all offences of forgery. But section 2 of the act provided that this abolition did not extent to punishments for forging or altering wills and certain powers of attorney.

Section 3 of the act provided that it is sufficient to describe a forgery in an indictment and that indictments did not need to include a copy of the forged document.

== Repeal ==
Section 1 of the Forgery Act 1837 (7 Will. 4 & 1 Vict. c. 84) abolished the exception, providing that any person convicted of any of those offences was liable to be transported for life, or for a term not less than seven years, or to be imprisoned for a term not exceeding four years and not less than two years.

The whole act was repealed by section 1 of, and the schedule to, the Criminal Statutes Repeal Act 1861 (24 & 25 Vict. c. 95), which came into force on 1 November 1861.

== See also ==
- Forgery Act
- Peel's Acts
- Capital punishment in the United Kingdom
