= Coinage Offences Act 1832 =

Act of the Parliament of the United Kingdom

- Act of Parliament
- Parliament of the United Kingdom
- Long title: An Act for consolidating and amending the Laws against Offences relating to the Coin.
- Citation: 2 & 3 Will. 4. c. 34
- Introduced by: George Eden, 1st Earl of Auckland (Lords)
- Territorial extent: United Kingdom

Dates
- Royal assent: 23 May 1832
- Commencement: 1 May 1832 (Note: Section 2.)
- Repealed: 1 November 1861
Other legislation
Amends	See § Repealed enactments
Repeals/revokes	See § Repealed enactments
Repealed by	Criminal Statutes Repeal Act 1861
Relates to	Criminal Law Act 1827; Criminal Statutes Repeal Act 1827; Larceny Act 1827; Malicious Injuries to Property Act 1827; Remedies against the Hundred Act 1827; Offences Against the Person Act 1828; Criminal Statutes (Ireland) Repeal Act 1828; Criminal Law (India) Act 1828; Offences Against the Person (Ireland) Act 1829; Forgery Act 1830; Forgery, Abolition of Punishment of Death Act 1832; Forgery Act 1837; Accessories and Abettors Act 1861; Criminal Statutes Repeal Act 1861; Larceny Act 1861; Malicious Damage Act 1861; Forgery Act 1861; Coinage Offences Act 1861; Offences Against the Person Act 1861

Status: Repealed

History of passage through Parliament

Records of Parliamentary debate relating to the statute from Hansard

Text of statute as originally enacted

The Coinage Offences Act 1832 (2 & 3 Will. 4. c. 34) was an act of the Parliament of the United Kingdom that consolidated for the United Kingdom all legislation concerning the counterfeiting and clipping of coins into one act. Such conduct was often considered to be high treason: this act downgraded the offence to felony and abolished the death penalty for all coinage offences.

== Passage ==
The bill had its first reading in the House of Commons on 10 April 1832. The bill had its second reading in the House of Commons on 16 April 1832 and was committed to a committee of the whole house, which met and reported on 9 May 1832, without amendments. The bill had its third reading in the House of Commons on 10 May 1832.

The bill was granted royal assent on 23 May 1832.

== Subsequent developments ==
The Forgery, Abolition of Punishment of Death Act 1832 (2 & 3 Will. 4. c. 123) abolished the death penalty for offences of forgery except for forging wills and certain powers of attorney. This exception was abolished by the Forgery Act 1837 (7 Will. 4 & 1 Vict. c. 84).

The whole act was repealed by section 1 of, and the schedule to, the Criminal Statutes Repeal Act 1861 (24 & 25 Vict. c. 95), which came into force on 1 November 1861.

== Repealed enactments ==
Section 1 of the act repealed 49 enactments, listed in that section, to take effect on 1 May 1832. Section 1 also provided that for offences and other matters committed or done before or on the last day of April 1832, that were previously punishable by death, the new punishment would be transportation "beyond the Seas" (likely to colonies) for life or a term not less than 7 years, or Imprisonment with or without hard labour not exceeding 4 years.

== See also ==
- High treason in the United Kingdom
- Capital punishment in the United Kingdom
- Treason Act 1351
- Treason Act 1415 (also Coin Acts 1572 and 1575)
- Coin Act 1732
- Treason Act
- Coinage Offences Act
- Peel's Acts
- Statute Law Revision Act
