= List of ordinances of the Legislative Council of Western Australia from 1836 =

This is a list of ordinances of the Legislative Council of Western Australia for the year 1836.

== 1836 ==
Short title, or popular name	Citation	Royal assent
Long title
	6 Will. IV. No. 1	11 April 1836
An Act to amend an Act intituled " An Act for establishing a Court of Civil Judicature." (Note: 2 Will. IV. No. 1) (Repealed by Supreme Court Ordinance 1861 (24 Vict. No. 15))
	6 Will. IV. No. 2	11 April 1836
An Act for the Recovery of small Debts in a summary way in Districts remote from Perth.
	6 Will. IV. No. 3	11 April 1836
An Act for attaching Debts, Money, Goods, or Effects in the hands of third Parties.
Imperial Acts Adopting Act 1836	6 Will. IV. No. 4	11 April 1836
An Act for adopting and applying certain Acts of Parliament passed in the first, (Note: Executors Act 1830 (11 Geo. 4 & 1 Will. 4. c. 40 (Imp))) (Note: Debts Recovery Act 1830 (11 Geo. 4 & 1 Will. 4. c. 47 (Imp))) (Note: Transfer of Trust Estates Act 1830 (11 Geo. 4 & 1 Will. 4. c. 60 (Imp))) (Note: Infants' Property Act 1830 (11 Geo. 4 & 1 Will. 4. c. 65 (Imp))) (Note: Forgery Act 1830 (11 Geo. 4 & 1 Will. 4. c. 66 (Imp))) the first and second, (Note: Excise Declarations Act 1831 (1 & 2 Will. 4. c. 4 (Imp))) the second, the second and third, (Note: Coinage Offences Act 1832 (2 & 3 Will. 4. c. 34 (Imp))) (Note: Punishment of Death, etc. Act 1832 (2 & 3 Will. 4. c. 62 (Imp))) (Note: Prescription Act 1832 (2 & 3 Will. 4. c. 71 (Imp))) (Note: Bills of Exchange Act 1832 (2 & 3 Will. 4. c. 98 (Imp))) (Note: Forgery, Abolition of Punishment of Death Act 1832 (2 & 3 Will. 4. c. 123 (Imp))) and the third and fourth (Note: Real Property Limitation Act 1833 (3 & 4 Will. 4. c. 27 (Imp))) (Note: Civil Procedure Act 1833 (3 & 4 Will. 4. c. 42 (Imp))) (Note: Criminal Law Act 1833 (3 & 4 Will. 4. c. 44 (Imp))) (Note: Administration of Estates Act 1833 (3 & 4 Will. 4. c. 104 (Imp))) (Note: Dower Act 1833 (3 & 4 Will. 4. c. 105 (Imp))) (Note: Inheritance Act 1833 (3 & 4 Will. 4. c. 106 (Imp))) years of the reign of His present Majesty, respectively, in the Administration of Justice in the Colony of Western Australia, in like manner as other laws of England are applied therein.

== Sources ==
- "legislation.wa.gov.au".
