= Substitution of Punishments of Death Act 1841 =

Act of the Parliament of the United Kingdom

- Act of Parliament
- Parliament of the United Kingdom
- Long title: An Act for taking away the Punishment of Death, and substituting other Punishments in lieu thereof.
- Citation: 4 & 5 Vict. c. 56
- Territorial extent: United Kingdom

Dates
- Royal assent: 22 June 1841
- Commencement: 1 October 1841 (Note: Section 7.)
- Repealed: 9 June 1890

Other legislation
- Amends: Bank of England Act 1741; National Debt (No. 2) Act 1750; National Debt (No. 4) Act 1795; National Debt Act 1797; Stamp Act 1815; Plate Duties Act 1815; Indian Salaries and Pensions Act 1825; Malicious Injuries to Property (England) Act 1827; Offences Against the Person Act 1828
- Amended by: Criminal Statutes Repeal Act 1861
- Repealed by: Customs and Inland Revenue Act 1890

Status: Repealed

Text of statute as originally enacted

The Substitution of Punishments of Death Act 1841 (4 & 5 Vict. c. 56) was an act of the Parliament of the United Kingdom.

It abolished the death penalty for rape, carnal knowledge of girls under the age of 10, any forgery cases not covered by previous Forgery, Abolition of Punishment of Death Act 1832 (2 & 3 Will. 4. c. 123) and Forgery Act 1837 (7 Will. 4 & 1 Vict. c. 84), embezzlement from the Bank of England and South Sea Company, returning to the United Kingdom or its territories before the end of a term of transportation and "riotous demolition" of property or churches, replacing it with other penalties such as transportation and imprisonment with or without hard labour.

== Subsequent developments ==
Sections 2 and 3 of the act, and so much of section 1 of the act as relates to embezzlements by officers or servants of the Bank of England, were repealed by section 1 of, and the schedule to, the Criminal Statutes Repeal Act 1861 (24 & 25 Vict. c. 95), which came into force on 1 November 1861.

The whole act was repealed by section 36 of, and the second schedule to, the Customs and Inland Revenue Act 1890 (53 & 54 Vict. c. 8), which came into force on 9 June 1890.
