= Forgery Act 1830 (UK) =

Act of the Parliament of the United Kingdom

Forgery Act 1830 (Note: The citation of the act by this short title was authorised by section 1 of, and the first schedule to, the Short Titles Act 1896. Due to the repeal of those provisions, it is now authorised by section 19(2) of the Interpretation Act 1978.)
- Act of Parliament
- Parliament of the United Kingdom
- Long title: An Act for reducing into One Act all such Forgeries as shall henceforth be punished with Death, and for otherwise amending the Laws relative to Forgery.
- Citation: 11 Geo. 4 & 1 Will. 4. c. 66
- Introduced by: Sir Robert Peel MP (Commons)
- Territorial extent: United Kingdom (Note: But see section 29.)

Dates
- Royal assent: 23 July 1830
- Commencement: 21 July 1830 (Note: Section 32.)
- Repealed: 1 January 1979
Other legislation
Amends	See § Repealed enactments
Repeals/revokes	See § Repealed enactments
Amended by	Forgery, Abolition of Punishment of Death Act 1832; Forgery Act 1837; Criminal Statutes Repeal Act 1861; Statute Law Revision Act 1890; Marriage Act 1949
Repealed by	Parochial Registers and Records Measure 1978
Relates to	Criminal Statutes Repeal Act 1827; Criminal Law Act 1827; Larceny Act 1827; Malicious Injuries to Property Act 1827; Remedies against the Hundred Act 1827; Offences Against the Person Act 1828; Criminal Statutes (Ireland) Repeal Act 1828; Criminal Law (India) Act 1828; Offences Against the Person (Ireland) Act 1829; Coinage Offences Act 1832; Forgery, Abolition of Punishment of Death Act 1832; Forgery Act 1837; Accessories and Abettors Act 1861; Criminal Statutes Repeal Act 1861; Larceny Act 1861; Malicious Damage Act 1861; Forgery Act 1861; Coinage Offences Act 1861; Offences Against the Person Act 1861

Status: Repealed

History of passage through Parliament

Records of Parliamentary debate relating to the statute from Hansard

Text of statute as originally enacted

The Forgery Act 1830 (11 Geo. 4 & 1 Will. 4. c. 66) was an act of the Parliament of the United Kingdom that consolidated for England and Wales all legislation imposing the death penalty for forgery (except for counterfeiting coins) into one act.

== Provisions ==
=== Section 2 – Forging the Great Seal, Privy Seal, Privy Signet, Royal Sign Manual etc, treason and capital ===
Section 2 of the act replaced the corresponding provisions in the Treason Act 1351 (25 Edw. 3 Stat. 5. c. 2) and the Treason Act 1553 (1 Mar. Stat. 2. c. 1). This form of treason was reduced to felony when section 2 was replaced by the Forgery Act 1861 (24 & 25 Vict. c. 98).

== Subsequent developments ==
Two years later, the Forgery, Abolition of Punishment of Death Act 1832 (2 & 3 Will. 4. c. 123) abolished the death penalty for most of these offences.

The Forgery Act 1837 (7 Will. 4. & 1 Vict. c 84) later abolished the death penalty for the remaining offences.

The words "and be it enacted" in section 21 of the act were repealed by section 1 of, and the schedule to, the Statute Law Revision (No. 2) Act 1888 (51 & 52 Vict. c. 3), which came into force on 24 December 1888.

As to trial of offences under the act at quarter sessions, see section 17 of the Central Criminal Court Act 1834 (4 & 5 Will 4 c 36).

The act was adopted in New South Wales by section 1 of the act 4 Will 4 No 4.

The whole act, except section 21, was repealed for the United Kingdom on 1 November 1861 by section 1 of, and the schedule to, the Criminal Statutes Repeal Act 1861 (24 & 25 Vict. c. 95), which came into force on 1 November 1861.

The whole act, except section 21, was repealed for New Zealand by section 3 of, and the first part of the schedule to, the Repeals Act 1878 (42 Vict No 28).

Section 21 of the act was repealed by section 26(2) of, and schedule 4 to, the Parochial Registers and Records Measure 1978 (No. 2). It is replaced by section 4 of that measure.

The whole act was repealed for the Republic of Ireland by sections 2(1) and 3(1) of, and part 4 of schedule 2 to, the Statute Law Revision Act 2007, which came into force on 8 May 2007.

== See also ==
- Forgery Act
- Peel's Acts

== Bibliography ==
- The Statutes of the United Kingdom of Great Britain and Ireland, 11 Geo. IV. & 1 Will. IV. 1830. King's Printer. London. 1830. Pages 403 to 418.
- Hansard
- The Law of Forgery; including the alterations effected by the late Act 1. Will. 4. c. 66. together with the Act, and Explanatory Notes, Forms of Indictments, and the Evidence in support of each Indictment. J & W T Clarke. Portugal Street, Lincoln's Inn, London. 1831. Google Books. Said to be by John Frederick Archbold: catalogues: New York City Bar Association; J & W T Clarke, pp 2, 3, 47 & 105.
- "The Forgery Act, 1830". Halsbury's Statutes of England. First Edition. Butterworth & Co (Publishers) Ltd. Bell Yard, Temple Bar, London. 1930. Volume 15. Page 699.
- William Newland Welsby and Edward Beavan. Chitty's Collection of Statutes. Second Edition. S Sweet. London. Hodges and Smith. Dublin. 1851. Volume 2. Title "Criminal Law". Subtitle "Forgery and False Personation". Pages 225 to 238.
- John Mews. The Digest of English Case Law . . . to the end of 1897. Sweet & Maxwell. Stevens & Sons. 1898. vol 4. cols 1271, 1274 to 1278, 1280 to 1286, 1305 & 1728.
- The English and Empire Digest. Butterworth & Co. London. 1924. vol 15. pp 1044, 1051, 1054, 1056 to 1065, 1067 to 1069 & 1072.
- The Digest: Annotated British, Commonwealth, and European Cases. Butterworth & Co (Publishers) Ltd. 1993. vol 14(2). pp 557, 576, 578, 579, 581, 582, 585, 586, 591 & 595.
- "Forgery Act 1830". The Statutes Revised, Northern Ireland. Second Edition. 1982. Volume A. Page 487.
- Thomas Walter Williams. "Forgeries". An Accurate Abstract of the Public General Statutes passed in 11 George IV. & 1 William IV. Printed for George Wightman. Paternoster Row. London. 1830. Pages 239 to 259.
- John Collyer. "Forgery". The Criminal Statutes of England. Printed for S Sweet. London. Printed for W Wrightson, Birmingham. 1832. At pages 142 to 162, 166 to 169, 205, 206, and 221m to 221o.
- William Evans, Anthony Hammond and Thomas Colpitts Granger. A Collection of Statutes Connected with the General Administration of the Law. Third Edition. Thomas Blenkarn. Edward Lumley. W H Bond. London.1836. Volume 10. A Supplement to the Collection of Statutes Connected with the General Administration of the Law. Part 5. Pages 816 to 828.
- Archibald John Stephens. The Statutes Relating to the Ecclesiastical and Eleemosynary Institutions of England, Wales, Ireland, India, and the Colonies. John W Parker. West Strand, London. Volume 2. Pages 1436 to 1438.
- John Jervis and William Newland Welsby. Archbold's Pleading, Evidence and Practice in Criminal Cases. Twelfth Edition. London. 1853. Pages 441 to 446, 457 to 459, 468 to 474, 477 to 479, 490, 762 and passim.
- Thomas Chitty. The Justice of the Peace and Parish Officer. S Sweet. A Maxwell. London. 1831. Volume 2. Pages 828 to 840.
- Joseph Chitty and John Walter Hume. "Of the Forgery of Bills, Notes, and Checks, and Offences of that Nature". A Practical Treatise on Bills of Exchange, Checks on Bankers, Promissory Notes, Bankers' Cash Notes and Bank Notes. Tenth American Edition from the Ninth London Edition. By O L Barbour. G & C Merriam. Springfield. 1842. Part 3. Chapter 1. Page *764 et seq. Twelfth American Edition from the Ninth London Edition. By J C Perkins. 1854. Part 3. Chapter 1. Page 844 et seq.
- Ratcliffe Pring. Statutes in Force in Colony of Queensland, to the Present Time. Brisbane. 1862. Volume 1. Pages 293 to 297.
- Alexander Oliver. A Collection of the Statutes of Practical Utility, Colonial and Imperial, in Force in New South Wales. Thomas Richards, Government Printer. Sydney. 1879. Volume 1. Pages 408 to 422.
- Henry Cary. A Collection of Statutes affecting New South Wales. Sands and Kenny. Sydney. Sands, Kenny & Co. Melbourne. 1861. Volume 1. Pages 309 to 323.
- Travers Adamson. Acts and Ordinances in Force in Victoria. John Ferres, Government Printer. Melbourne. 1855. Volume 1. Pages 428 to 432.
- The Law Relating to India, and the East-India Company. Second Edition. Wm H Allen & Co. London. 1841. Pages 349 to 351.
- "Criminal Law Report" (1835) 13 The Law Magazine 1 at 9
- The Punishment of Death: A Selection of Articles from the Morning Herald. 1836. vol 1. p 18 and passim.
