= Criminal Statutes Repeal Act 1827 =

Act of the Parliament of the United Kingdom

- Act of Parliament
- Parliament of the United Kingdom
- Long title: An Act for repealing various Statutes in England relative to the Benefit of Clergy, and to Larceny and other Offences connected therewith, and to malicious Injuries to Property, and to Remedies against the Hundred.
- Citation: 7 & 8 Geo. 4. c. 27
- Introduced by: Sir Robert Peel MP (Commons)
- Territorial extent: England and Wales (Note: Section 1.)

Dates
- Royal assent: 21 June 1827
- Commencement: 1 July 1827
- Repealed: 5 August 1873
Other legislation
Amends	See § Repealed enactments
Repeals/revokes	See § Repealed enactments
Repealed by	Statute Law Revision Act 1873
Relates to	Criminal Law Act 1826; Criminal Law Act 1827; Larceny Act 1827; Malicious Injuries to Property Act 1827; Remedies against the Hundred Act 1827; Offences Against the Person Act 1828; Criminal Statutes (Ireland) Repeal Act 1828; Criminal Law (India) Act 1828; Offences Against the Person (Ireland) Act 1829; Forgery Act 1830; Coinage Offences Act 1832; Accessories and Abettors Act 1861; Criminal Statutes Repeal Act 1861; Larceny Act 1861; Malicious Damage Act 1861; Forgery Act 1861; Coinage Offences Act 1861; Offences Against the Person Act 1861

Status: Repealed

History of passage through Parliament

Records of Parliamentary debate relating to the statute from Hansard

Text of statute as originally enacted

The Criminal Statutes Repeal Act 1827 (7 & 8 Geo. 4. c. 27) or the Criminal Statutes (England) Repeal Act 1827 was an act of the Parliament of the United Kingdom that repealed for England and Wales enactments relating to the English criminal law from 1225 to 1826.

The act was one of Peel's Acts which consolidated, repealed and replaced a large number of existing statutes.

Similar provision was made for Ireland by the Criminal Statutes (Ireland) Repeal Act 1828 (9 Geo. 4. c. 53) and for India by the Criminal Law (India) Act 1828 (9 Geo. 4. c. 74).

== Background ==
In the United Kingdom, acts of Parliament remain in force until expressly repealed. Blackstone's Commentaries on the Laws of England, published in the late 18th-century, raised questions about the system and structure of the common law and the poor drafting and disorder of the existing statute book.

In 1806, the Commission on Public Records passed a resolution requesting the production of a report on the best mode of reducing the volume of the statute book. From 1810 to 1825, The Statutes of the Realm was published, providing for the first time the authoritative collection of acts. In 1816, both Houses of Parliament passed resolutions that an eminent lawyer with 20 clerks be commissioned to make a digest of the statutes, which was declared "very expedient to be done." However, this was never done.

On 16 March 1824, the Select Committee on the Criminal Law in England was appointed to consider the expediency of consolidating and amending the criminal law. The Select Committee reported on 2 April 1824, resolving to consolidate the criminal law under several heads and to bring in bills to do so.

In 1822, Sir Robert Peel entered the cabinet as home secretary and in 1826 introduced a number of reforms to the English criminal law, which became known as Peel's Acts. This included efforts to modernise, consolidate and repeal provisions from a large number of earlier statutes, including:

- Benefit of Clergy
- Larceny and other Offences of Stealing
- Burglary, Robbery and Threats for the Purpose of Robbery or of Extortion
- Embezzlement, False Pretences, and the Receipt of Stolen Property
- Malicious Injuries to Property
- Remedies against the Hundred

== Passage ==
On 17 April 1826, In the committee of the whole house of the House of Commons for the Criminal Law Act 1826 (7 Geo. 4 c. 64), the home secretary, Sir Robert Peel MP, indicated to the House his intention to bring forward bills in the next session for the consolidation of criminal statutes.

Leave to bring in the Criminal Laws Consolidation Bills was given in the House of Commons on 22 February 1827, and the bill was brought in by the home secretary, Sir Robert Peel MP, the attorney general, Charles Wetherell MP, and the solicitor general, Sir Nicholas Conyngham Tindal MP. In his speech introducing the bill, Sir Robert Peel MP stated that the four consolidation bills aimed simplifying and consolidating criminal laws in England, including:

1. A bill to consolidate and amend laws relating to theft and related offenses
2. A bill to amend laws relating to malicious injury of property
3. A bill to consolidate and amend laws relating to remedies against the hundred
4. A bill to repeal statutes that would be superseded by the first three bills

Peel's stated that overall aim was to simplify and modernize the criminal law, reducing the number of capital offenses and making the law more coherent and intelligible. He emphasised the need to proceed gradually with reforms to ensure their effectiveness and acceptance.

The Larceny Laws Repeal Bill had their first reading and second reading in the House of Commons on 13 March 1827 and were committed to a committee of the whole house. In the debate, Sir John Newport, 1st Baronet MP expressed his surprise that the bills did not extend to Ireland and was reassured that such bills (to become the Criminal Statutes (Ireland) Repeal Act 1828 (9 Geo. 4. c. 53)) were in preparation.

Following Peel's resignation as home secretary, Peel continued to superintend the passage of the bills through Parliament, The committee stage for the bill was deferred several times and the committee reported on 1 June 1827, with amendments. The amended bill had its third reading in the House of Commons on 6 June 1827.

The bill, now named the Larceny Laws &c. Repeal Bill, had its first reading in the House of Lords on 7 June 1827, second reading in the House of Lords on 13 June 1827 and was committed to a committee of the whole house. The committee met on 14 June 1827 and issued its report on 15 June 1827, with amendments to ensure bill extended to "Offences committed within the Jurisdiction of the Admiralty of England". The amended bill had third reading in the House of Lords on 18 June 1827 and passed, without amendments.

The amended bill was considered by and agreed to by the House of Commons on 19 June 1827.

The bill was granted royal assent on 21 June 1827.

== Subsequent developments ==
In 1827, Peel's Acts were passed to modernise, consolidate and repeal provisions of the criminal law of England and Wales, including:

- The Criminal Statutes Repeal Act 1827 (7 & 8 Geo. 4. c. 27), which repealed over 140 enactments relating to the criminal law.
- The Criminal Law Act 1827 (7 & 8 Geo. 4. c. 28), which modernised the administration of criminal justice.
- The Larceny Act 1827 (7 & 8 Geo. 4. c. 29), which consolidated enactments relating to larceny.
- The Malicious Injuries to Property Act 1827 (7 & 8 Geo. 4. c. 30), which consolidated enactments relating to malicious injuries to property.
- The Remedies Against the Hundred (England) Act 1827 (7 & 8 Geo. 4. c. 31), which consolidated enactments relating to remedies against the hundred.

In 1828, parallel bills for Ireland to Peel's Acts were introduced, becoming:

- The Criminal Statutes (Ireland) Repeal Act 1828 (9 Geo. 4. 54), which repealed for Ireland over 140 enactments relating to the English criminal law.
- The Criminal Law (Ireland) Act 1828 (9 Geo. 4. 54), which modernised the administration of criminal justice
- The Larceny (Ireland) Act 1828 (9 Geo. 4. c. 55) which consolidated provisions in the law relating to larceny.
- The Malicious Injuries to Property (Ireland) Act 1828 (9 Geo. 4. c. 56), which consolidated provisions in the law relating to malicious injuries to property.

In 1828, the Offences Against the Person Act 1828 (9 Geo. 4. c. 31) was passed, which consolidated enactments relating to offences against the person and repealed for England and Wales almost 60 related enactments. In 1829, the Offences Against the Person (Ireland) Act 1829 (10 Geo. 4. c. 34) was passed, which consolidated enactments relating to offences against the person and repealed for Ireland almost 60 enactments relating to the criminal law of Ireland.

In 1861, bills were introduced, drafted by Charles Sprengel Greaves to mirror Peel's Acts, to consolidate and modernise the criminal law across:

- Offences Against the Person
- Malicious Injuries to Property
- Larceny
- Forgery
- Coining
- Accessories and Abettors

In 1861, the Criminal Consolidation Acts were passed for that purpose:

- The Accessories and Abettors Act 1861 (24 & 25 Vict. c. 94), which modernised provisions in the law relating to Aiding and abetting.
- The Criminal Statutes Repeal Act 1861 (24 & 25 Vict. c. 95), which repealed for England and Wales and Ireland over 100 enactments relating to the criminal law.
- The Larceny Act 1861 (24 & 25 Vict. c. 96), which modernised provisions in the law relating to larceny.
- The Malicious Damage Act 1861 (24 & 25 Vict. c. 97), which modernised provisions in the law relating to malicious injury to property.
- The Forgery Act 1861 (24 & 25 Vict. c. 98), which modernised provisions in the law relating to forgery.
- The Coinage Offences Act 1861 (24 & 25 Vict. c. 99), which modernised provisions in the law relating to coinage.
- The Offences Against the Person Act 1861 (24 & 25 Vict. c. 100), which modernised provisions in the law relating to offences against the person.

=== Statute Law Revision Acts ===
The territorial extent of the act was limited to England and Wales. Section 1 of the Criminal Statutes (Ireland) Repeal Act 1828 (9 Geo. 4. c. 53) largely mirrored the act for Ireland, including repealing acts extended to Ireland by the passage of Poynings' Act 1495. Section 125 of the Criminal Law (India) Act 1828 (9 Geo. 4. c. 74) repealed for India all the enactments listed in the act.

The territorial terms of the act led to several acts being for the avoidance of doubt for Scotland repealed by later Statute Law Revision Acts, including:

- Statute Law Revision Act 1861 (24 & 25 Vict. c. 101)
- Statute Law Revision Act 1867 (30 & 31 Vict. c. 59)
- Statute Law Revision Act 1872 (35 & 36 Vict. c. 63)
- Statute Law Revision Act 1873 (36 & 37 Vict. c. 91)
- Statute Law Revision Act 1887 (50 & 51 Vict. c. 59)
- Statute Law (Repeals) Act 1973 (1973 c. 39)

=== Repeal ===
The whole act was repealed by section 1 of, and the schedule to, the Statute Law Revision Act 1873 (36 & 37 Vict. c. 91), which came into force on 5 August 1873.

== Repealed enactments ==
Section 1 of the act repealed 142 enactments, listed in that section. The territorial extent of the repeal, to take effect on 1 July 1827, was limited to England and Wales and the jurisdiction of the Admiralty of England. Section 1 of the act also provided that for offences and other matters committed or done before or on the last day of June 1827, the repealed acts would still apply as if the act had not been passed.

Section 2 of the act stated that the extent of any repeals did not stretch to the Post Office, the South Sea Company, the Bank of England, "any Branch of the Public Revenue", navy and army stores and other royal "Public Stores", with the exception of:

- Embezzlement Act 1588 (31 Eliz. 1. c. 4)
- Sale of Horses Act 1588 (31 Eliz. 1. c. 12)
- Benefit of Clergy Act 1670 (22 Cha. 2. c. 5)

Citation	Short title	Description	Extent of repeal
9 H. 3. st. 2. c. 10 (Note: See 25 Edw. 1.)	Charter of the Forest c. 10	A Charter or Statute made in the Ninth Year of the Reign of King Henry the Third, commonly called Charta de Forestá.	As relates to the Punishment for taking the King's Venison
3 Edw. 1. c. 2	Statute of Westminster 1275 Benefit of clergy	A Statute made at Westminster in the Third Year of the Reign of King Edward the First.	As relates to Clerks taken for guilty of Felony
3 Edw. 1. c. 20	Statute of Westminster 1275 Trespassers in parks and ponds	A Statute made at Westminster in the Third Year of the Reign of King Edward the First.	As relates to Trespassers in Parks and Ponds.
13 Ed. 1. st. 1. c. 46	Commons Act 1285	A Statute made at Westminster in the Thirteenth Year of the same Reign,	As ordains that the Towns near adjoining shall be distrained to levy at their own Cost a Hedge or Dyke overthrown, and to yield Damages.
13 Ed. 1. st. 2. c. 1	Statute of Winchester Fresh Suit shall be made after Felons and Robbers from Town to Town, &c.	The whole of a Statute made in the same Year, intituled Statutum Winton.	Except so much thereof as forbids Fairs and Markets being kept in Churchyards.
13 Ed. 1. st. 2. c. 2	Statute of Winchester Inquiry of Felons and Robbers, and the County shall answer if they be not taken	The whole of a Statute made in the same Year, intituled Statutum Winton.	Except so much thereof as forbids Fairs and Markets being kept in Churchyards.
13 Ed. 1. st. 2. c. 3	Statute of Winchester This Act shall be respited until Easter next	The whole of a Statute made in the same Year, intituled Statutum Winton.	Except so much thereof as forbids Fairs and Markets being kept in Churchyards.
21 Ed. 1. st. 2.	Statutum de Malefactoribus in Parcis	A Statute made in the Twenty first Year of the same Reign, intituled Statutum de Malefactoribus in Parcis.	The whole act.
1 Ed. 3. st. 1. c. 8	Offences in Forests	A Statute made in the First Year of the Reign of King Edward the Third.	As relates to Trespasses in the King's Forests of Vert and Venison
25 Ed. 3. st. 6. (Note: vulgo st. 3) c. 4	An Ordinance for the Clergy Benefit of clergy	A Statute made in the Twenty fifth Year of the same Reign, intituled Ordinatio pro Clero.	As relates to Clerks convicted of Treasons or Felonies.
25 Ed. 3. st. 6. (Note: vulgo st. 3) c. 5	An Ordinance for the Clergy Benefit of clergy	A Statute made in the Twenty fifth Year of the same Reign, intituled Ordinatio pro Clero.	As relates to the Arraignment of Clerks.
28 Edw. 3. c.11	Confirmation, etc. of 13 Edw. 1 Stat. Wynton. cc. 1, 2	A Statute made in the Twenty eighth Year of the same Reign.	As relates to making Cry and fresh Suit, and to Hundreds and Franchises being answerable as therein mentioned.
34 Edw. 3. c. 22	Finding of hawks	A Statute made in the Thirty fourth Year.	As relates to Hawks
37 Edw. 3. c. 19	N/A	Another Statute made in the Thirty seventh Year of the same Reign.	As relates to Hawks
8 Hen. 6. c. 12	Amendment Act 1429	So much of a Statute made in the Eighth Year of the Reign of King Henry the Sixth.	As relates to the Offences of stealing, taking away, withdrawing, or avoiding of any Record or other like Thing therein mentioned. I.e., section 3.
33 Hen. 6. c. 1	Embezzlement	A Statute made in the Thirty third Year of the same Reign.	As relates to Servants taking and spoiling the Goods.
1 Hen. 7. c. 7	Hunting in Forests Act 1485	An Act passed in the First Year of the Reign of King Henry the Seventh, intituled An Act against unlawful Hunting in Forests and Parks.	The whole act.
4 Hen. 7. c. 13	Benefit of Clergy Act 1488	An Act passed in the Fourth Year of the same Reign, intituled An Act to take away the Benefit of Clergy from certain Persons.	The whole act.
21 Hen. 8. C. 7	Embezzlement Act 1529	An Act passed in the Twenty first Year of the Reign of King Henry the Eighth, intituled An Act for the Punishment of such Servants as shall withdraw themselves, and go away with their Masters or Mistresses' Caskets and other Jewels or Goods committed to them in Trust to be kept.	The whole act.
21 Hen. 8. c. 11	Restitution of Goods Stolen Act 1529	An Act passed in the same Year, intituled An Act for Restitution to be made of the Goods of such as shall be robbed by Felons.	The whole act.
23 Hen. 8. c. 1	Act of General Pardon 1529	An Act passed in the Twenty third Year of the same Reign, intituled An Act that no Person committing Petty Treason, Murder or Felony shall be admitted to his Clergy under Subdeacon.	The whole act.
23 Hen. 8. c. 11	Breaking Prison Act 1531	An Act passed in the same Year, intituled An Act for breaking of Prison by Clerks Convict.	The whole act.
31 Hen. 8. c. 2	Fishing Act 1539	An Act passed in the Thirty first Year of the same Reign, intituled An Act against Fishing in Ponds.	The whole act.
33 Hen. 8. c. 1	Counterfeit Letters, etc. Act 1541	An Act passed in the Thirty third Year of the same Reign, intituled An Act concerning counterfeit Letters, or privy Tokens, to receive Money or Goods in other Men's Names.	The whole act.
34 & 35 Hen. 8. c. 14	Criminal Law Act 1542	An Act passed in the Thirty fourth and Thirty fifth Years of the same Reign, intituled An Act for a Certificate of Convicts to be made into the King's Bench	The whole act.
35 Hen. 8. c. 17	Preservation of Woods Act 1543	An Act passed in c.14. the Thirty fifth Year of the same Reign, intituled An Act for the Preservation of Woods.	The whole act.
37 Hen. 8. c. 6	Criminal Law Act 1545	An Act passed in the Thirty seventh Year of the same Reign, intituled An Act against Burning of Frames	The whole act.
37 Hen. 8. c. 8	Indictments Act 1545	An Act passed in the same Year, intituled An Act that an Indictment lacking these Words, Vi et Armis, shall be sufficient in Law.	As relates to Persons stealing any Horse, Gelding, Mare, Foal, or Filly. I.e., section 2.
1 Edw. 6. c. 12	Treason Act 1547	An Act passed in the First Year of the Reign of King Edward the Sixth, intituled An Act for the Repeal of certain Statutes concerning Treasons, Felonies, etc.	As relates to House-breaking, Robbing, Horse-stealing, and Sacrilege, and to the Allowance of the Benefit of Clergy in any Case therein mentioned. I.e., sections 10 and 14.
2 & 3 Edw. 6. c. 33	Horse Stealing Act 1548	An Act passed in the Second and Third Years of the same Reign, intituled An Act that no Man stealing Horse or Horses shall enjoy the Benefit of his Clergy.	The whole act.
5 & 6 Edw. 6. c. 9	Robbery Act 1551	An Act passed in the Fifth and Sixth Years of the same Reign, intituled An Act that no Man robbing any House, Booth, or Tent, shall not be admitted to the Benefit of his Clergy.	The whole act.
4 & 5 P. & M. c. 4	Accessories in Murder, etc. Act 1557	An Act passed in the Fourth and Fifth Years of the Reign of King Philip and Queen Mary, intituled An Act that Accessories in Murder and divers Felonies shall not have the Benefit of Clergy.	As relates to Accessories to any Robbery or Burning therein mentioned.
5 Eliz. 1. c. 10	Embezzlement Act 1562	An Act passed in the Fifth Year of the Reign of Queen Elizabeth, intituled An Act reviving a Statute made Anno 21 H. 8. touching Servants embezzling their Masters' Goods	The whole act.
5 Eliz. 1. c. 21	Unlawful fishing, etc. Act 1562	Another Act passed in the same Fifth Year, intituled An Act for the Punishment of unlawful taking of Fish, Deer, or Hawks	The whole act.
8 Eliz. 1. c. 4	Benefit of Clergy Act 1566	An Act passed in the Eighth Year of the same Reign, intituled An Act to take away the Benefit of Clergy from certain felonious Offenders	The whole act.
13 Eliz. 1. c. 25	Continuance of Laws Act 1571	An Act passed in the Thirteenth Year of the same Reign, intituled An Act for the reviving and Continuance of certain Statutes.	As alters and perpetuates the Act of the Thirty fifth Year of the Reign of King Henry the Eighth hereinbefore recited. I.e., sections 18 and 19.
18 Eliz. 1. c. 7	Benefit of Clergy Act 1575	An Act passed in the Eighteenth Year of the Reign of Queen Elizabeth, intituled An Act to take away Clergy from the Offenders in Rape and Burglary, and an Order for the Delivery of Clerks Convict without Purgation.	As relates to Burglary, and to Persons admitted to the Benefit of Clergy
27 Eliz. 1. c. 13	Hue and Cry Act 1584	An Act passed in the Twenty seventh Year of the same Reign, intituled An Act for the following of Hue and Cry.	The whole act
31 Eliz. 1. c. 4	Embezzlement Act 1588	An Act passed in the Thirty first Year of the same Reign, intituled An Act against embezzling of Armour, Habiliments of War, and Victual.	The whole act.
31 Eliz. 1. c. 12	Sale of Horses Act 1588	An Act passed in the same Year, intituled An Act to avoid Horse- stealing.	As enacts that all Accessories to Horse-stealing shall be deprived of the Benefit of Clergy.
39 Eliz. 1. c. 15	Robbery Act 1597	An Act passed in the Thirty ninth Year of the same Reign, intituled An Act that no Person robbing any House in the Day-time, although no Person be therein, shall be admitted to have the Benefit of his Clergy.	The whole act.
43 Eliz. 1. c. 7	Robbing of Orchards, etc. Act 1601	An Act passed in the Forty third Year of the same Reign, intituled An Act to avoid and prevent divers Misdemeanors in lewd and idle Persons.	The whole act
43 Eliz. 1. c. 13	Outrages in Northern Counties Act 1601	An Act passed in the same Year, intituled An Act for the more peaceable Government of the Parts of Cumberland, Northumberland, Westmorland, and the Bishopric of Durham.	The whole act.
2 Jas. 1. c. 27 (Note: This Act was recognized as existing in 2 Geo. 3. c. 29.)	Game Act 1603	An Act passed in the Second Year of the Reign of King James the First, intituled An Act for the better Execution of the Intent and Meaning of former Statutes made against shooting in Guns, and for the Preservation of the Game of Pheasants and Partridges, and against the destroying of Hares with Hare Pipes, and tracing Hares in the Snow.	As relates to House Doves, Pigeons, and Deer
3 Jas. 1. c. 13 (Note: This Act was recognized as existing in 16 Geo. 3. c. 30.)	Stealing of Deer, etc. Act 1605	An Act passed in the Third Year of the same Reign, intituled An Act against unlawful hunting and stealing of Deer and Conies.	The whole act
7 Jas. 1. c. 13 (Note: This Act was recognized as existing in 16 Geo. 3. c. 30.)	Deer Stealing Act 1609	An Act passed in the Seventh Year of the same Reign, for the Explanation of the last-mentioned Act	The whole act
15 Cha. 2. c. 2	Destruction of Trees Act 1663	An Act passed in the Fifteenth Year of the Reign of King Charles the Second, intituled An Act for the Punishment of unlawful cutting or stealing or spoiling of Wood and Underwood, and destroying of young Timber Trees.	The whole act.
22 Cha. 2. c. 5	Benefit of Clergy Act 1670	An Act passed in the Twenty second Year of the same Reign, intituled An Act for taking away the Benefit of Clergy from such as steal Cloth from the Rack, and from such as shall steal His Majesty's Ammunition and Stores.	The whole act.
22 & 23 Cha. 2. c. 7	Burning of Houses, etc. Act 1670	An Act passed in the Twenty second and Twenty third Years of the same Reign, intituled An Act to prevent the malicious burning of Houses, Stacks of Corn and Hay, and killing or maiming of Cattle.	The whole act.
22 & 23 Cha. 2. c. 11	Piracy Act 1670	An Act passed in the same Years, intituled An Act to prevent the Delivery up of Merchants Ships, and for the Increase of good and serviceable Shipping.	As relates to the wilful Destruction of any Ship by any of the Persons belonging to it, as therein mentioned. I.e., section 12.
22 & 23 Cha. 2. c. 25	Game Act 1670	An Act passed in the same Years, intituled An Act for the better Preservation of the Game, and for securing Warrens not inclosed, and the several Fishings of this Realm.	So far as relates to all Subjects therein mentioned, except the Appointment and Powers of Gamekeepers, Search Warrants and the Description of Persons who are thereby declared to be Persons not allowed to have or keep for themselves or any other Person any Guns, Bows, Greyhounds, or other Animals or Things therein enumerate. I.e., except sections 1 to 3.
3 Will. & Mar. c. 9	Benefit of Clergy, etc. Act 1691	An Act passed in the Third Year of the Reign of King William and Queen Mary, intituled An Act to take away Clergy from some Offenders, and to bring others to Punishment.	The whole act.
4 Will. & Mar. c. 23	Game Act 1692	An Act passed in the Fourth Year of the same Reign, intituled An Act for the more easy Discovery and Conviction of such as shall destroy the Game of this Kingdom.	As relates to Pigeons and Fish, and to Persons wrongfully fishing, and to all Instruments and Engines for destroying or taking Fish, and to the burning of any Grig, Ling, Heath, Furze, Goss, or Fern.
4 Will. & Mar. c. 24	Estreats (Personal Representatives) Act 1692	An Act passed in the Fourth Year of the same Reign, intituled An Act for reviving, continuing, and explaining several Laws therein mentioned, which are expired and near expiring.	As explains the said recited Act of the Third Year of the same Reign. I.e., section 13.
10 Will. 3. c. 12 (Note: vulgo 10 & 11 Will. 3. c. 23.)	Clerks of Assize (Fees) Act 1698	An Act passed in the Tenth Year of the Reign of King William the Third, intituled An Act for the better apprehending, prosecuting, and punishing of Felons that commit Burglary, House-breaking, or Robbery in Shops, Warehouses, Coach Houses, or Stables, or that steal Horses.	Except so much thereof as relates to Fees for discharging Recognizances and drawing Bills of Indictment, and to defective Bills of Indictment. I.e., except sections 7 and 8.
1 Ann. St. 2. c. 9	Witnesses on Trial for Treason, etc. Act 1702	An Act passed in the First Year of the Reign of Queen Anne, intituled An Act for punishing of Accessories to Felonies and Receivers of Stolen Goods, and to prevent the wilful burning and destroying of Ships.	Except so much thereof as relates to Witnesses on behalf of the Prisoner upon any Trial for Treason or Felony. I.e., section 3.
6 Ann. c. 9 (Note: vulgo 5 Ann. c. 6.)	Burglaries, etc. Act 1706	An Act passed in the Sixth Year of the same Reign, intituled An Act for repealing a Clause in an Act, intituled An Act for the better apprehending, prosecuting, and punishing Felons that commit Burglaries, Housebreaking, or Robberies in Shops, Warehouses, Coach Houses, or Stables, or that ' steal Horses.	The whole act.
12 Ann. St. 1. c. 7	Robberies in Houses Act 1712	An Act passed in the Twelfth Year of the same Reign, intituled An Act for the more effectual preventing and punishing Robberies that shall be committed in Houses	Thole whole Act.
13 Ann. c. 21 (Note: vulgo 12 Ann. st. 2. c. 18.)	Stranded Ships Act 1713	An Act passed in the Thirteenth Year of the same Reign, intituled An Act for the preserving all such Ships, and Goods thereof, which shall happen to be forced on Shore or stranded upon the Coasts of this Kingdom, or any other of her Majesty's Dominions.	As relates to any Person upon whom any Goods stolen or carried off from any Vessel in Distress shall be found, and to the several Offences touching Vessels in Distress which are thereby made Capital Felonies. I.e., sections 4 and 5.
1 Geo. 1. St. 2. c. 5	Riot Act	An Act passed in the First Year of the Reign of King George the First, intituled An Act for preventing Tumults and riotous Assemblies, and for the more speedy and effectual punishing the Rioters.	As relates to any Rioters demolishing or pulling down, or beginning to demolish or pull down, any of the Buildings therein mentioned, and to the Liability of the Inhabitants of the Hundred, City, or Town, in which the Damage shall be done, to yield Damages to the Party injure. I.e., sections 4 and 6.
1 Geo. 1. St. 2 c. 48	Preservation of Timber Trees Act 1715	An Act passed in the same Year, intituled An Act to encourage the planting of Timber Trees, Fruit Trees, and other Trees for Ornament, Shelter, or Profit, and for the better Preservation of the same, and for the preventing the burning of Woods.	The whole act.
4 Geo. 1. c. 11	Piracy Act 1717	An Act passed in the Fourth Year of the same Reign, intituled An Act for the further preventing Robbery, Burglary, and other Felonies, and for the more effectual Transportation of Felons and unlawful Exporters of Wool, and for declaring the Law upon some Points relating to Pirates.	Except so much thereof as relates to the Trial of Piracy, Felony, or Robbery committed within the Admiralty Jurisdiction.
5 Geo. 1. c. 28	Destruction of Deer (England) Act 1718	An Act passed in the Fifth Year of the same Reign, intituled An Act for the further Punishment of such Persons as shall unlawfully kill or destroy Deer in Parks, Paddocks, or other inclosed Grounds.	The whole act.
6 Geo. 1. c. 16	Preservation of Timber Trees, etc. (Scotland) Act 1719	An Act passed in the Sixth Year of the same Reign, intituled An Act to explain and amend an Act passed in the First Year of His Majesty's Reign, intituled An Act to encourage the planting of Timber Trees, Fruit Trees, and other Trees for Ornament, Shelter, or Profit, and for the better Preservation of the same, and for the preventing the burning of Woods,' and for the better Preservation of the Fences of such Woods.	The whole act. (Note: This act was wholly repealed by the Statute Law Revision Act 1887 (50 & 51 Vict. c. 59).)
9 Geo. 1. c. 22	Criminal Law Act 1722	An Act passed in the Ninth Year of the same Reign, intituled An Act for the more effectual punishing wicked and evil- disposed Persons going armed in Disguise, and doing Injuries and Violences to the Persons and Properties of His Majesty's Subjects, and for the more speedy bringing the Offenders to Justice.	The whole act.
2 Geo. 2. c. 25	Perjury Act 1728	An Act passed in the Second Year of the Reign of King George the Second, intituled An Act for the more effectual preventing and further Punishment of Forgery, Perjury, and Subornation of Perjury, and to make it Felony to steal Bonds, Notes, or other Securities for Payment of Money.	As relates to the stealing or taking by Robbery any Orders or other Securities therein enumerated. I.e., section 3
4 Geo. 2. c. 32	Theft Act 1730	An Act passed in the Fourth Year of the same Reign, intituled An Act for the more effectual punishing Stealers of Lead or Iron Bars fixed to Houses, or any Fences belonging thereunto.	The whole act.
6 Geo. 2. c. 37	Perpetuation of Various Laws Act 1732	An Act passed in the Sixth Year of the same Reign, intituled An Act for making 6 G.2. c.37. perpetual the several Acts therein mentioned, for the better Regulation of Juries; and for empowering the Justices of Session or Assizes for the Counties Palatine of Chester, Lancaster, and Durham, to appoint a Special Jury in Manner therein mentioned; and for continuing the Act for regulating the Manufacture of Cloth in the West Riding of the County of York, (except a Clause therein contained; ) and for continuing an Act for the more effectual punishing wicked and evil-disposed Persons going armed in Disguise, and for other Purposes therein mentioned; and to prevent the cutting or breaking down the Bank of any River, or any Sea Bank, and to prevent the malicious cutting of Hopbinds; and for continuing an Act made in the Thirteenth and Fourteenth Years of the Reign of King Charles the Second, for preventing Theft and Rapine upon the Northern Borders of England; and for reviving and continuing certain Clauses in Two other Acts made for the same Purpose.	The whole act.
8 Geo. 2. c.16	Hue and Cry Act 1734	An Act passed in the Eighth Year of the Reign of King George the Second, intituled An Act for the Amendment of the Law relating to Actions on the Statute of Hue and Cry.	The whole act
8 Geo. 2. c. 20	Destruction of Turnpikes, etc. Act 1734	An Act passed in the same Year, intituled An Act for rendering the Laws more effectual for punishing such Persons as shall wilfully and maliciously pull down or destroy Turnpikes for repairing Highways, or Locks, or other Works erected by Act of Parliament for making Rivers navigable, and for other Purposes therein mentioned	The whole act
10 Geo. 2. c. 32	Offences Against Persons and Property Act 1736	An Act passed in the Tenth Year of the same Reign, intituled An Act for continuing an Act for the more effectual punishing wicked and except § 10. evil-disposed Persons going armed in Disguise, and doing Injuries and Violences to the Persons and Properties of His Majesty's Subjects, and for the more speedy bringing the Offenders to Justice; and for continuing Two Clauses, to prevent the cutting or breaking down the Bank of any River or Sea Bank, and to prevent the malicious cutting of Hopbinds, contained in an Act passed in the Sixth Year of His present Majesty's Reign; and for the more effectual Punishment of Persons removing any Materials used for securing Marsh or Sea Walls or Banks, and of Persons maliciously setting on Fire any Mine, Pit, or Delph of Coal or Cannel Coal, and of Persons unlawfully hunting or taking any Red or Fallow Deer in Forests or Chases, or beating or wounding Keepers or other Officers in Forests, Chases, or Parks; and for more effectually securing the Breed of Wild Fowl.	Except so much thereof as relates to Wild Fowl. I.e., except section 10.
11 Geo. 2. c.22	Corn Exportation Act 1737	An Act for punishing. such Persons as shall do Injuries and Violences to the Persons or to the End. Properties of His Majesty's Subjects, with Intent to hinder the Exportation of Corn.	As relates to the Liability of the Inhabitants of Hundreds. I.e., section 5 to the End.
13 Geo. 2. c. 21	Destruction of Coal Works Act 1739	An Act passed in the Thirteenth Year of the same Reign, intituled An Act for further and more effectually preventing the wilful and malicious Destruction of Collieries and Coal Works.	The whole act
14 Geo. 2. c. 6	Cattle Stealing Act 1740	An Act passed in the Fourteenth Year of the same Reign, intituled An Act to render the Laws more effectual for the preventing the stealing and destroying of Sheep and other Cattle.	The whole act.
15 Geo. 2. c. 34	Cattle Stealing Act 1741	An Act passed in the Fifteenth Year of the same Reign, intituled An Act to explain an Act made in the Fourteenth Year of the Reign of His present Majesty, intituled An Act to render the Laws more effectual for preventing the stealing and destroying of Sheep and other Cattle.	The whole act.
22 Geo. 2. c. 24	Hue and Cry Act 1748	An Act passed in the Twenty second Year of the same Reign, intituled An Act for remedying Inconveniences which may happen by Proceedings in Actions on the Statute of Hue and Cry.	The whole act.
22 Geo. 2. c. 46	Continuance of Laws, etc. Act 1748	An Act passed in the same Year, for (among other Purposes) ascertaining the Method of levying Writs of Execution against the Inhabitants of Hundred.	As relates to such Writs and the Proceedings thereupon. I.e., section 34.
24 Geo. 2. c. 45	Robberies on Rivers, etc. Act 1750	An Act passed in the Twenty fourth Year of the same Reign, intituled An Act for the more effectual preventing of Robberies and Thefts upon any Navigable Rivers, Ports of Entry or Discharge, Wharfs and Keys adjacent.	The whole act. (Note: This Act was repealed by the Statute Law Revision Act 1867. The Notes to the Statute Law Revision Act 1867 state: "Repealed as to England by 7 & 8 Geo. 4. c. 27. s. 1. This Act, although in terms applying to Great Britain, could never have been in force in Scotland. [See 12 Geo. 3. c. 20. Repealed in part by 1 Geo. 4. c. 53. Repealed as to India by 9 Geo. 4. c. 74. s. 125.]")
25 Geo. 2. c.10	Stealing from Blacklead Mines Act 1751	An Act passed in the Twenty fifth Year of the same Reign, intituled An Act for the more effectual securing Mines of Black Lead from Theft and Robbery.	The whole act.
25 Geo. 2. c. 36	Disorderly Houses Act 1751	An Act passed in the same Year, intituled An Act for the better preventing Thefts and Robberies, and for regulating Places of Public Entertainment, and punishing Persons keeping disorderly Houses.	As relates to the Advertisements therein prohibited.
26 Geo. 2. c. 19	Stealing Shipwrecked Goods Act 1753	An Act passed in the Twenty sixth Year of the same Reign, intituled An Act for enforcing the Laws against Persons who shall steal or detain shipwrecked Goods, and for the Relief of Persons suffering Losses thereby.	As relates to any of the Felonies therein mentioned, and to Search Warrants, and to Property belonging to any Vessel lost, stranded, or cast on Shore, being found in any Place, or in the Possession of any Person, and to any Person offering or exposing to Sale any such Property, as therein respectively mentioned. I.e., sections 1, 2, 3, 4 and 8.
28 Geo. 2. c. 19	Thefts, Robberies, etc. Act 1755	An Act passed in the Twenty eighth Year of the same Reign, for (among other Purposes) preventing the burning or destroying of Goss, Furze, or Fern in Forests or Chase.	As relates to Persons burning or destroying the same. I.e., section 8.
29 Geo. 2. c. 30	Stealing of Lead, etc. Act 1756	An Act passed in the Twenty ninth Year of the same Reign, intituled An Act for more effectually discouraging and preventing the stealing, and the buying and receiving stolen Lead, Iron, Copper, Brass, Bell-metal, and Solder, and for more effectually bringing the Offenders to Justice.	The whole act
29 Geo. 2. c. 36	Inclosure Act 1756	An Act passed in the same Year, intituled An Act for inclosing, by the mutual Consent of the Lords and Tenants, Part of any Common, for the Purpose of planting and preserving Trees fit for Timber or Underwood, and for more effectually preventing the unlawful Destruction of Trees.	As relates to the Remedy for the Recovery of Damages against the Inhabitants of the adjoining Parishes, Towns, Hamlets, Villages, or Places, and to the Punishment of the several Offences relating to Trees, and to the Explanation respecting the Three Acts of King George the First, as therein respectively mentioned. I.e., sections 6, 7, 8 and 9.
30 Geo. 2. c. 24	Obtaining Money by False Pretences, etc. Act 1757	An Act passed in the Thirtieth Year of the same Reign, intituled An Act for the more effectual Punishment of Persons who shall attain or attempt to attain Possession of Goods or Money by false or untrue Pretences; for preventing the unlawful pawning of Goods; for the easy Redemption of Goods pawned; and for preventing Gaming in Public Houses by Journeymen, Labourers, Servants, and Apprentices.	As relates to obtaining by false Pretence or Pretences any Property as therein mentioned.
31 Geo. 2. c. 35	Continuance of Laws, etc., (No. 2) Act 1757	an Act passed in the Thirty first Year of the same Reign, intituled. An Act to continue several Laws therein mentioned, for granting a Liberty to carry Sugars, of the Growth, Produce, or Manufacture of any of His Majesty's Sugar Colonies in America, from the said Colonies directly into Foreign Parts, in Ships built in Great Britain and navigated according to Law; for the preventing the committing of Frauds by Bankrupts; for giving further Encouragement for the Importation of Naval Stores from the British Colonies in America; and for preventing Frauds and Abuses in the Admeasurement of Coals in the City and Liberty of Westminster; and for preventing the stealing or destroying of Madder Roots.	The whole act. (Note: This Act was repealed by the Statute Law Revision Act 1867. The Notes to the Statute Law Revision Act 1867 state "Repealed in part by 26 Geo. 3. c. 108. s. 27. Repealed as to England by 7 & 8 Geo. 4. c. 27. s. 1. As to Scotland— expired in part. residue obsolete. [Repealed as to India by 9 Geo. 4. c. 74. s. 125.]")
2 Geo. 3. c. 29	Preservation of House Doves, etc. Act 1762	An Act passed in the Second Year of the Reign of King George the Third, intituled An Act to amend so much of an Act made in the First Year of the Reign of King James the First, intituled ‘An Act for the better Execution of the Intent and Meaning of former Statutes made against shooting in Guns, and for the Preservation of the Game of Pheasants and Partridges, and against the destroying of Hares with Hare Pipes, and tracing Hares in the Snow,' as relates to the Preservation of House Doves and Pigeons, by making the Manner of convicting such Person or Persons as shall offend therein more easy and expeditious.	The whole act.
4 Geo. 3. c. 12	Continuance of Laws (No. 2) Act 1763	An Act passed in the Fourth Year of the Reign of King George the Third, intituled An Act to 4 G.3. c.12. continue several Laws for the better Regulation of Pilots for the conducting of Ships and Vessels from Dover, Deal, and the Isle of Thanet, up the Rivers of Thames and Medway; relating to the landing of Rum or Spirits of the British Sugar Plantations before the Duties of Excise are paid thereon; and to the further Punishment of Persons going armed or disguised in defiance of the Laws of Customs or Excise; and to the Relief of the Officers of the Customs in Informations upon Seizures; and for granting a Liberty to carry Sugars, of the Growth, Produce, or Manufacture of any of His Majesty's Sugar Colonies, directly into Foreign Parts, in Ships built in Great Britain, and navigated according to Law; and for punishing Persons who shall damage or destroy any Banks, Floodgates, Sluices, or other Works belonging to the Rivers and Streams made navigable by Act of Parliament.	The whole act.
4 Geo. 3. c. 31	Indemnity Act 1763	An Act passed in the same Year, intituled An Act to indemnify such Persons as have omitted to qualify themselves for Offices and Employments, and to indemnify Justices of the Peace, Deputy Lieutenants, and Officers of the Militia, or others, who have omitted to register or deliver in their Qualifications within the Time limited by Law, and for giving further Time for those Purposes; and to indemnify Members and Officers in Cities, Corporations, and Borough Towns, whose Admissions have been omitted to be stamped according to the several Acts of Parliament now in force for that Purpose, or having been stamped have been lost or mislaid, and for allowing them Time to provide Admissions duly stamped; and to prevent the Destruction of Trees and Underwoods growing in Forests and Chases.	The whole act. (Note: This act was wholly repealed by the Statute Law Revision Act 1887 (50 & 51 Vict. c. 59).)
5 Geo. 3. c. 14	Preservation of Fish and Conies Act 1765	An Act passed in the Fifth Year of the same Reign, intituled An Act for the more effectual Preservation of Fish in Fish Ponds and other Waters, and Conies in Warrens, and for preventing the Damage done to Sea Banks within the County of Lincoln by the breeding Conies therein	The whole act.
6 Geo. 3. c. 36	Cultivation, etc., of Trees Act 1766	An Act passed in the Sixth Year of the same Reign, intituled An Act for encouraging the Cultivation, and for the better Preservation of Trees, Roots, Plants, and Shrubs.	The whole act. (Note: This Act was repealed by the Statute Law Revision Act 1867. The Notes to the Statute Law Revision Act 1867 state "Repealed as to England by 7 & 8 Geo. 4. c. 27. s. 1. This Act, although it would appear from its preamble to apply to Great Britain, could never have been in force in Scotland. [Repealed as to India by 9 Geo. 4. c. 74. s. 125.]")
6 Geo. 3. c. 48	Preservation of Timber Trees Act 1766	Another Act passed in the same Year, intituled An Act for the better Preservation of Timber Trees, and of Woods and Underwoods, and for the further Preservation of Roots, Shrubs, and Plants.	The whole act. (Note: This Act was repealed by the Statute Law Revision Act 1867. The Notes to the Statute Law Revision Act 1867 state "Repealed as to England by 7 & 8 Geo. 4. c. 27. s. 1. This Act, although in terms extended to Great Britain, could never have been in force in Scotland. [Amended and extended to Great Britain by 43 Geo. 3. c. 60. Applied by — 48 Geo. 3. c. 72. s. 7. 32 Geo. 3 c. 71. s. 1. 32 Geo. 3. c. 74. s. 7. Repealed as to India by 9 Geo. 4. c. 74. s. 125.]")
9 Geo. 3. c. 29	Malicious Injury Act 1769	An Act passed in the Ninth Year of the same Reign, intituled An Act for the more effectual Punishment of such Persons as shall demolish or pull down, burn, or otherwise destroy or spoil any Mill or Mills, and for preventing the destroying or damaging of Engines for draining Collieries and Mines, or Bridges, Waggonways, or other Things used in conveying Coals, Lead, Tin, or other Minerals from Mines, or Fences for inclosing Lands in pursuance of Acts of Parliament.	The whole act. (Note: This act was wholly repealed by the Statute Law Revision Act 1887 (50 & 51 Vict. c. 59).)
9 Geo. 3. c. 41	Customs, etc. (No. 2) Act 1769	An Act passed in the same Year, intituled An Act for better securing the Duties of Customs upon certain Goods removed from the Out Ports and other Places to London; for regulating the Fees of Officers of His Majesty's Customs in the Province of Senegambia, in Africa: for allowing to the Receivers General of the Duties on Offices and Employments, in Scotland, a proper Compensation for their Trouble and Expences; for the better Preservation of Hollies, Thorns, and Quicksets in Forests, Chases, and private Grounds, and of Trees and Underwoods in Forests and Chases; and for authorizing the Exportation of a limited Quantity of an inferior Sort of Barley called Bigg, from the Port of Kirkwall, in the Islands of Orkney.	The whole act. (Note: This Act was repealed by the Statute Law Revision Act 1867. The Notes to the Statute Law Revision Act 1867 state "Repealed as to England by 7 & 8 Geo. 4. c. 27. s. 1. Sects. 1-4. repealed by 6 Geo. 4. c. 105. Sect. 7. virtually repealed; see now 5 & 6 Will. 4. c. 62. s. 10. 12 & 13 Vict. c. 1. s. 13. Sects. 8, 9, although in terms extended to Great Britain, could never have been in force in Scotland. Sects. 10, 11. (and last) spent. [Amended by 40 Geo. 3. c. 39. Amended and extended to Great Britain by 43 Geo. 3. c. 66. Repealed as to India by 9 Geo. 4. c. 74. s. 125.]")
10 Geo. 3. c. 18	Dog Stealing Act 1770	An Act passed in the Tenth Year of the same Reign, intituled An Act for preventing the stealing of Dogs.	The whole act.
10 Geo. 3. c. 48	Receiving Stolen Jewels, etc. Act 1770	Another Act passed in the same Year, intituled An Act for making the receiving of stolen Jewels, and Gold and Silver Plate, in the Case of Burglary and Highway Robbery, more penal.	The whole act.
13 Geo. 3. c. 31	Indemnity Act 1772	An Act passed in the Thirteenth Year of the same Reign, intituled An Act for the more effectual Execution of Criminal Laws in the Two Parts of the United Kingdom.	As relates to the Prosecution and Punishment of Persons for Theft or Larceny, and for receiving or having any stolen Property as therein mentioned. I.e., sections 4 and 5.
13 Geo. 3. c. 32	Stealing of Vegetables Act 1772	An Act passed in the same Year, intituled An Act for repealing so much of an Act made in the Twenty third Year of His late Majesty King George the Second, as relates to the preventing the stealing, or destroying of Turnips; and for the more effectually preventing the stealing or destroying of Turnips, Potatoes, Cabbages, Parsnips, Pease, and Carrots.	The whole act.
13 Geo. 3. c. 33	Preservation of Timber Act 1772	Another Act passed in the same Thirteenth Year, intituled An Act to extend the Provisions of An Act made in the Sixth Year of His present Majesty's Reign, intituled An Act for 'the better Preservation of Timber Trees, and of Woods and Underwoods, and for the further Preservation of Roots, Shrubs, and ' Plants,' to Poplar, Alder, Maple, Larch, and Hornbeam.	The whole act. (Note: This Act was repealed in whole by the Statute Law Revision Act 1861. The Notes to the Statute Law Revision Act 1861 state "Repealed as to England by 7 & 8 Geo. 4. c. 27. s. 1.; as to India by 9 Geo. 4. c. 74. s. 125. The express repeal by 7 & 8 Geo. 4. c. 27. is in terms limited to England, but the Act here entered did not extend to Scotland.")
16 Geo. 3. c. 30	Stealing of Deer Act 1776	An Act passed in the Sixteenth Year of the same Reign, intituled An Act more effectually to prevent the stealing of Deer, and to repeal several former Statutes made for the like Purpose.	The whole act.
19 Geo. 3. c. 74	Penitentiary Act 1779	An Act passed in the Nineteenth Year of the same Reign, intituled An Act to explain and amend the Laws relating to the Transportation, Imprisonment, and other Punishment of certain Offenders.	Except so much thereof as relates to the Judges Lodgings. I.e., sections 70.
21 Geo. 3. c. 68	Criminal Law Act 1781	An Act passed in the Twenty first Year of the same Reign, intituled An Act to explain and amend an Act made in the Fourth Year of the Reign of His late Majesty King George the Second, intituled ‘An Act for the more effectual punishing Stealers of Lead and Iron Bars fixed to Houses, or any Fences belonging thereunto’.	The whole act. (Note: This Act was repealed in whole by the Statute Law Revision Act 1861. The Notes to the Statute Law Revision Act 1861 state "Repealed as to England by 7 & 8 Geo. 4. c. 27. s. 1., and as to India by 9 Geo. 4. c.74. s.125. The express repeal is in terms limited to England, but the Act here entered did not extend to Scotland.")
21 Geo. 3. c. 69	Criminal Law (No. 2) Act 1781	Another Act passed in the same Twenty first Year, intituled An Act to explain and amend an Act made in the Twenty ninth Year of the Reign of His late Majesty King George the Second, intituled ‘An Act for more effectually discouraging and preventing the stealing, and the buying and receiving of stolen Lead, Iron, Copper, Brass, Bell-metal, and Solder, and for more effectually bringing the Offenders to Justice’.	The whole act. (Note: This Act was repealed in whole by the Statute Law Revision Act 1861. The Notes to the Statute Law Revision Act 1861 state "Repealed as to England by 7 & 8 Geo. 4. c. 27. s. 1., and as to India by 9 Geo. 4. c.74. s.125. The express repeal is in terms limited to England, but the Act here entered did not extend to Scotland.")
22 Geo. 3. c. 58	Criminal Law (No. 2) Act 1782	an Act passed in the Twenty second Year of the Reign of King George the Third, intituled An Act for the more easy Discovery and effectual Punishment of Buyers and Receivers of Stolen Goods.	The whole act. (Note: This Act was repealed in whole by the Statute Law Revision Act 1861. The Notes to the Statute Law Revision Act 1861 state "Repealed as to England by 7 & 8 Geo. 4. c. 27. s. 1., and as to India by 9 Geo. 4. c. 74. s. 125. The express repeal in 7 & 8 Geo. 4. c. 27. is limited to England, but the Act does not extend to Scotland. See 3 & 4 Vict. c. 74.")
31 Geo. 3. c. 35	Evidence Act 1791	An Act passed in the Thirty first Year of the same Reign, intituled An Act to render Persons convicted of Petty Larceny competent Witnesses.	The whole act.
31 Geo. 3. c. 51	Oyster Fisheries Act 1791	An Act passed in the same Year, intituled An Act for better protecting the several Oyster Fisheries within this Kingdom.	The whole act. (Note: This Act was repealed in whole by the Statute Law Revision Act 1861. The Notes to the Statute Law Revision Act 1861 state "(Repealed as to England by 7 & 8 Geo. 4. c. 27. s. 1., and as to India by 9 Geo. 4. c.74. s.125.) The express repeal is in terms limited to England, but the Act here entered did not extend to Scotland.")
33 Geo. 3. c. 67	Shipping Offences Act 1793	An Act passed in the Thirty third Year of the same Reign, intituled An Act for better preventing Offences in obstructing, destroying, or damaging Ships or other Vessels, and in obstructing Seamen, Keelmen, Casters, and Ship Carpenters, from pursuing their lawful Occupations.	As relates to Persons who shall wilfully and maliciously set fire to, or destroy or damage otherwise than by Fire, any Ship, Keel, or other Vessel. I.e., sections 5 and 6.
36 Geo. 3. c. 9	Passage of Grain Act 1795	An Act passed in the Thirty sixth Year of the same Reign, intituled An Act to prevent Obstructions to the free Passage of Grain within the Kingdom.	As relates to the Liability of the Inhabitants of Hundreds. I.e., sections 3 to the End.
39 Geo. 3. c. 85	Embezzlement Act 1799	An Act passed in the Thirty ninth Year of the same Reign, intituled An Act to protect Masters against Embezzlements by their Clerks or Servants.	The whole act. (Note: This Act was repealed in whole by the Statute Law Revision Act 1861. The Notes to the Statute Law Revision Act 1861 state "Repealed by 7 & 8 Geo. 4. c. 27. s. 1. as to England, and by 9 Geo. 4. c. 74. s. 125. as to India; the Act here entered did not extend to Scotland.")
39 & 40 Geo. 3. c. 77	Collieries and Mines Act 1800	An Act passed in the Thirty ninth and Fortieth Years of the same Reign, intituled An Act for the Security of Collieries and Mines, and for the better Regulation of Colliers and Miners.	As declares what Persons shall be deemed and adjudged to be guilty of a Misdemeanor, and as relates to any Person who shall steal or take away, or break, destroy, damage, or embezzle, any Article not exceeding the Value of Five Shillings as therein mentioned, or shall break, destroy, or damage any Waggon, Cart, or other Carriage as therein mentioned. I.e., sections 1 and 5.
41 Geo. 3. (U.K.) c. 24	Compensation for Injuries to Mills, etc. Act 1801	An Act passed in the Forty first Year of the same Reign, intituled An Act for the indemnifying of Persons injured by the forcible pulling down and demolishing of Mills, or of Works thereunto belonging, by Persons unlawfully and riotously assembled.	The whole act. (Note: This act was wholly repealed by the Statute Law Revision Act 1887 (50 & 51 Vict. c. 59).)
42 Geo. 3. c. 67	Theft of Turnips, etc. Act 1802	An Act passed in the Forty second Year of the same Reign, intituled An Act to extend the Provisions of an Act made in the Thirteenth Year of the Reign of His present Majesty, intituled ‘An Act for repealing so much of an Act made in the Twenty third Year of His late Majesty King George the Second, as relates to the preventing the stealing or destroying of Turnips, and for the more effectually preventing the stealing or destroying of Turnips, Potatoes, Cabbages, Parsnips, Pease, and Carrots,' to certain other Field Crops, and to Orchards; and for amending the said Act.	The whole act. (Note: This act was wholly repealed by the Statute Law Revision Act 1887 (50 & 51 Vict. c. 59).)
42 Geo. 3. c. 107	Deer Stealing (England) Act 1802	An Act passed in the same Forty second Year, intituled An Act more effectually to prevent the stealing of Deer.	The whole act.
43 Geo. 3. c. 58	Malicious Shooting or Stabbing Act 1803	An Act passed in the Forty third Year of the same Reign, intituled An Act for the further Prevention of malicious shooting, and attempting to discharge loaded Fire Arms, stabbing, cutting, wounding, poisoning, and the malicious using of Means to procure the Miscarriage of Women; and also the malicious setting Fire to Buildings; and also for repealing a certain Act made in England in the Twenty first Year of the late King James the First, intituled An Act to prevent the destroying and ' murdering of Bastard Children; ' and also an Act made in Ireland in the Sixth Year of the Reign of the late Queen Anne, also intituled An Act to prevent the destroying and murdering of Bastard Children;' and for making other Provisions in lieu thereof.	As relates to the setting Fire to any of the Buildings therein enumerated. I.e., part of section 1.
43 Geo. 3. c. 113	Casting Away of Vessels, etc. Act 1803	An Act passed in the same Forty third Year, intituled An Act for the more effectually providing except § 6. For the Punishment of Offences in wilfully casting away, burning, or destroying Ships or Vessels; and for the more convenient Trial of Accessories in Felonies; and for extending the Powers of an Act made in the Thirty third Year of the Reign of King Henry the Eighth, as far as relates to Murders, to Accessories to Murders, and to Manslaughters.	Except so much thereof as specially relates to Accessories before the Fact in Murder, and to Manslaughter. I.e., except section 6.
44 Geo. 3. c. 92	Apprehension of Offenders Act 1804	An Act passed in the Forty fourth Year of King George the Third, intituled An Act to render more easy the apprehending and bringing to Trial Offenders escaping from one Part of the United Kingdom to the other, and also from one County to another.	As relates to the Prosecution and Punishment of Persons for Theft or Larceny, and for receiving or having any Stolen Property, as therein mentioned. I.e., sections 7 and 8.
45 Geo. 3. c. 66	Preservation of Timber Trees, etc. Act 1805	An Act passed in the Forty fifth Year of the same Reign, intituled An Act to prevent in Great Britain the illegally carrying away Bark; and for amending Two Acts passed in the Sixth and Ninth Years of His present Majesty's Reign, for the Preservation of Timber Trees, Underwoods, Roots, Shrubs, Plants, Hollies, Thorns, and Quicksets.	The whole act. (Note: This Act was repealed in whole by the Statute Law Revision Act 1872. The Notes to the Statute Law Revision Act 1872 state: "Repealed as to England by 7 & 8 Geo. 4. c. 27. s. 1. So far as not so repealed, repeal consequential on repeal by The Statute Law Revision Act, 1867, of Acts extended. [Repealed as to India by 9 Geo. 4. c. 74. s. 125.]")
48 Geo. 3. c. 129	Larceny Act 1808	An Act passed in the Forty eighth Year of the same Reign, intituled An Act to repeal so much of an Act passed in the Eighth Year of the Reign of Queen Elizabeth, intituled An Act to take away the Benefit of Clergy 'from certain Offenders for Felony,' as takes away the Benefit of Clergy from Persons stealing privily from the Person of another; and for more effectually preventing the Crime of Larceny from the Person.	The whole act. (Note: This Act was repealed in whole by the Statute Law Revision Act 1861. The Notes to the Statute Law Revision Act 1861 state: "Repealed as to England by 7 & 8 Geo. 4. c. 27. s. 1., and as to India by 9 Geo. 4. c. 74. s. 125. Semble, the Act entered in Col. 1. does not apply to Scotland or Ireland, although s. 2. is general in terms.")
48 Geo. 3. c. 144	Oyster Fisheries (England) Act 1808	An Act passed in the same Forty eighth Year, intituled An Act for the more effectual Protection of Oyster Fisheries and the Brood of Oysters in England.	The whole act. (Note: This Act was repealed in whole by the Statute Law Revision Act 1873. The Notes to the Statute Law Revision Act 1873 state: "As to England repealed by 7 & 8 Geo. 4. c. 27. s. 1. As to Scotland inapplicable or superseded by 38 Geo. 3. c. 52. [Repealed as to India by 9 Geo. 4. c. 74. s. 125.]")
51 Geo. 3. c. 41	Stealing of Linen, etc. Act 1811	An Act passed in the Fifty first Year of the same Reign, intituled An Act to repeal so much of an Act passed in the Eighteenth Year of the Reign of King George the Second, intituled An Act for the more effectually ' preventing the stealing of Linen, Fustian, and Cotton Goods and Wares, in Buildings, Fields, Grounds, and other Places used for ' printing, whitening, bleaching, or dyeing the same,' as takes away the Benefit of Clergy from Persons stealing Cloth in Places therein mentioned; and for more effectually preventing such Felonies.	The whole act. (Note: This act was wholly repealed by the Master and Servant Act 1889 (52 & 53 Vict. c. 24).)
51 Geo. 3. c. 120	Deer Stealing (England) Act 1811	An Act passed in the same Fifty first Year, intituled An Act to amend an Act of the Forty seventh Year of His present Majesty, for more effectually preventing the stealing of Deer.	The whole act.
52 Geo. 3. c. 63	Embezzlement by Bankers, etc. Act 1812	An Act passed in the Fifty second Year of the same Reign, intituled An Act for more effectually preventing the Embezzlement of Securities for Money and other Effects left or deposited for safe Custody, or other special Purpose, in the Hands of Bankers, Merchants, Brokers, Attornies, or other Agents.	The whole act.
52 Geo. 3. c. 64	Obtaining Bonds, etc., Under False Pretences Act 1812	An Act passed in the same Year, intituled An Act for extending the Provisions of an Act of the Thirtieth Year of King George the Second, against Persons obtaining Money by false Pretences, to Persons so obtaining Bonds and other Securities.	The whole act. (Note: This Act was repealed in whole by the Statute Law Revision Act 1861. The Notes to the Statute Law Revision Act 1861 state: "Repealed as to England, by 7 & 8 Geo. 4. c. 27. s. 1. as to Ireland, by 9 Geo. 4. c. 53. s. 1. as to India, by 9 Geo. 4. c. 74. s. 125. It is conceived this Act does not apply to Scotland.")
52 Geo. 3. c. 130	Malicious Damage Act 1812	Another Act passed in the same Fifty second Year, intituled An Act for the more effectual Punishment of Persons destroying the Properties of His Majesty's Subjects, and enabling the Owners of such Properties to recover Damages for the Injury sustained.	The whole act. (Note: This Act was repealed in whole by the Statute Law (Repeals) Act 1973.)
53 Geo. 3. c. 162	Imprisonment with Hard Labour Act 1813	An Act passed in the Fifty third Year of the same Reign, intituled An Act to repeal a certain Pro- 53 G.3. c. 162. vision respecting Persons convicted of Felony without Benefit of Clergy, contained in an Act made in the Fifty second Year of the Reign of His present Majesty, for the Erection of a Penitentiary House for the Confinement of Persons convicted within the City of London and County of Middlesex, and for making other Provisions in lieu thereof.	As relates to the Punishment of Larceny.
56 Geo. 3. c. 125	Malicious Damage (Scotland) Act 1816	An Act passed in the Fifty sixth Year of the same Reign, intituled An Act for the more effectual Punishment of Persons riotously destroying or damaging Buildings, Engines, and Machinery used in and about Collieries and other Mines, Waggonways, Bridges, and other Works used in conveying and shipping Coals and other Minerals; and for enabling the Owners of such Property to recover Damages for the Injury sustained.	The whole act. (Note: This Act was repealed in whole by the Statute Law (Repeals) Act 1973.)
57 Geo. 3. c. 19	Seditious Meetings Act 1817	An Act passed in the Fifty seventh Year of the same Reign, intituled An Act for the more effectually preventing Seditious Meetings and Assemblies.	As relates to the Liability of the Inhabitants of the City, Town, or Hundred, to yield Compensation to the Party injured, as therein mentioned. I.e., section 38.
1 Geo. 4. c. 56	Malicious Trespass Act 1820	An Act passed in the First Year of the Reign of His present Majesty, intituled An Act for the summary Punishment, in certain Cases, of Persons wilfully or maliciously damaging or committing Trespasses on public or private Property.	The whole act.
1 Geo. 4. c. 115	Capital Punishment Act 1820	An Act passed in the same Year, intituled An Act to repeal so much of the several Acts passed in the Thirty ninth Year of the Reign of Elizabeth, the Fourth of George the First, the Fifth and Eighth of George the Second, as inflicts Capital Punishment on certain Offences therein specified, and to provide more suitable and effectual Punishment for such Offences.	Except so much thereof as relates to the Offences made Capital by the said Act of Queen Elizabeth.
1 Geo. 4. c. 117	Stealing in Shops etc. Act 1820	Another Act passed in the same Year of the present Reign, intituled An Act to repeal so much of an Act passed in the Tenth and Eleventh Years of King William the Third, intituled ‘An Act for the better apprehending, prosecuting, and punishing of Felons that commit Burglary, Housebreaking, or Robbery in Shops, Warehouses, Coach Houses, or Stables, or that steal Horses’, as takes away the Benefit of Clergy from Persons privately stealing, in any Shop, Warehouse, Coach House, or Stable, any Goods, Wares, or Merchandizes of the Value of Five Shillings; and for more effectually preventing the Crime of stealing privately in Shops, Warehouses, Coach Houses, or Stables.	The whole act.
3 Geo. 4. c. 24	Receivers of Stolen Goods, etc. Act 1822	An Act passed in the Third Year of the present Reign, intituled An Act for extending the Laws against Receivers of Stolen Goods to Receivers of Stolen Bonds, Bank Notes, and other Securities for Money.	The whole act.
3 Geo. 4. c. 33	Riotous Assemblies (Scotland) Act 1822	An Act passed in the same Year, intituled An Act for altering and amending several Acts passed in the First and Ninth Years of the Reign of King George the First, and in the Forty first, Fifty second, Fifty sixth, and Fifty seventh Years of the Reign of His late Majesty King George the Third, so far as the same relate to the Recovery of Damages committed by riotous and tumultuous Assemblies, and unlawful and malicious Offenders.	The whole act. (Note: This Act is still in force as of 2024.)
3 Geo. 4. c. 38	Punishment for Manslaughter, etc. Act 1822	An Act passed in the same Year of the present Reign, intituled An Act for the further and more adequate Punishment of Persons convicted of Manslaughter, and of Servants convicted of robbing their Masters, and of Accessories before the Fact to Grand Larceny, and certain other Felonies.	Except so far as relates to Manslaughter. I.e., except section 1.
3 Geo. 4. c. 114	Hard Labour Act 1822	Another Act passed in the same Year, intituled An Act to provide for the more effectual Punishment of certain Offences, by Imprisonment with hard Labour.	As relates to the Punishment for receiving Stolen Goods, and for obtaining any Property as therein mentioned by false Pretences.
3 Geo. 4. c. 126	Turnpike Roads Act 1822	An Act passed in the same Year, intituled An Act to amend the General Laws now in being for regulating Turnpike Roads in that Part of Great Britain called England.	As creates any Felony.
4 Geo. 4. c. 46	Capital Punishments, etc. Act 1823	An Act passed in the Fourth Year of the present Reign, intituled An Act for repealing the Capital Punishments inflicted by several Acts of the Sixth and Twenty seventh Years of King George the Second, and of the Third, Fourth, and Twenty second Years of King George the Third, and for providing other Punishments in lieu thereof, and in lieu of the Punishment of Framebreaking under an Act of the Twenty eighth Year of the same Reign.	Except so far as relates to the Felonies created by the Acts of the Twenty seventh Year of King George the Second and of the Third Year of King George the Third therein recited.
4 Geo. 4. c. 53	Benefit of Clergy, etc. Act 1823	An Act passed in the same Year of the present Reign, intituled An Act for extending the Benefit of Clergy to several Larcenies therein mentioned.	Except so far as relates to any Person convicted of stealing or embezzling His Majesty's Ammunition, Sails, Cordage, or Naval or Military Stores, or of being accessory to any such Offence.
4 Geo. 4. c. 54	Benefit of Clergy, etc. (No. 2) Act 1823	An Act passed in the same Year, intituled An Act for allowing the Benefit of Clergy to Persons convicted of certain Felonies under Two Acts of the Ninth Year of King George the First and of the Twenty seventh Year of King George the Second; for making better Provision for the Punishment of Persons guilty of sending or delivering threatening Letters, and of Assaults with Intent to commit Robbery.	Except so far as relates to any Person who shall send or deliver any Letter or Writing threatening to kill or murder, or to burn or destroy, as therein mentioned, or shall be accessory to any such Offence, or shall forcibly rescue any Person being lawfully in Custody for any such Offence.
6 Geo. 4. c. 19	Threatening Letters Act 1825	An Act passed in the Sixth Year of the present Reign, intituled An Act for the Amendment of the Law as to the Offence of sending threatening Letters.	The whole act. (Note: This Act was repealed by the Statute Law Revision Act 1861. The Notes to the Statute Law Revision Act 1861 state: "Repealed As to England, by 7 & 8 Geo. 4. c. 27. s. 1. As to Ireland, by 9 Geo. 4. c. 53. s. 1. As to India, by 9 Geo. 4. c. 74. s. 125. Semble, this Act does not apply to Scotland, as it is indexed by the King's Printers as relating only to England. ")
6 Geo. 4. c. 94	Factor Act 1825	An Act passed in the same Year of the present Reign, intituled An Act to alter and amend an Act for the better Protection of the Property of Merchants and others, who may hereafter enter into Contracts or Agreements in relation to Goods, Wares, or Merchandize intrusted to Factors or Agents.	As relates to any Misdemeanor therein mentioned. I.e., sections 7, 8, 9 and 10.
7 Geo. 4. c. 69	Stealing from Gardens Act 1826	An Act passed in the Seventh Year of the present Reign, intituled An Act to amend Law in respect to the Offence of stealing from Gardens and Hothouses.	The whole act.

== See also ==
- Halsbury's Statutes
- Statute Law Revision Act

== Bibliography ==
- "Benefit of Clergy and Peerage" (1841) 21 The Legal Observer 342 (No 642: 6 March 1841)
