= Criminal Law (India) Act 1828 =

Act of the Parliament of the United Kingdom

Criminal Law (India) Act 1828 (Note: The citation of this act by this short title was authorised by section 1 of, and the first schedule to, the Short Titles Act 1896. Due to the repeal of those provisions it is now authorised by section 19(2) of the Interpretation Act 1978.)
- Act of Parliament
- Parliament of the United Kingdom
- Long title: An Act for improving the Administration of Criminal Justice in the East Indies.
- Citation: 9 Geo. 4. c. 74
- Territorial extent: United Kingdom; British India; (Note: Section 1.)

Dates
- Royal assent: 25 July 1828
- Commencement: 1 March 1829
- Repealed: 31 July 1964
Other legislation
Amends	See § Repealed enactments
Repeals/revokes	See § Repealed enactments
Amended by	Statute Law Revision Act 1890
Repealed by	Statute Law Revision Act 1964
Relates to	Criminal Law Act 1827; Criminal Statutes Repeal Act 1827; Larceny Act 1827; Malicious Injuries to Property Act 1827; Remedies against the Hundred Act 1827; Offences Against the Person Act 1828; Criminal Statutes (Ireland) Repeal Act 1828; Forgery Act 1830; Coinage Offences Act 1832; Criminal Law Consolidation Acts 1861Forgery Act 1830; Accessories and Abettors Act 1861; Criminal Statutes Repeal Act 1861; Larceny Act 1861; Malicious Damage Act 1861; Forgery Act 1861; Coinage Offences Act 1861; Offences Against the Person Act 1861

Status: Repealed

Text of statute as originally enacted

The Criminal Law (India) Act 1828 (9 Geo. 4. c. 74) was an act of the Parliament of the United Kingdom which reformed criminal justice in India.

The act repealed for India acts repealed for England and Wales in the Criminal Statutes Repeal Act 1827 (7 & 8 Geo. 4 c. 27).

== Background ==
In the United Kingdom, acts of Parliament remain in force until expressly repealed. Blackstone's Commentaries on the Laws of England, published in the late 18th-century, raised questions about the system and structure of the common law and the poor drafting and disorder of the existing statute book.

In 1806, the Commission on Public Records passed a resolution requesting the production of a report on the best mode of reducing the volume of the statute book. From 1810 to 1825, The Statutes of the Realm was published, providing for the first time the authoritative collection of acts. In 1816, both Houses of Parliament, passed resolutions that an eminent lawyer with 20 clerks be commissioned to make a digest of the statutes, which was declared "very expedient to be done." However, this was never done.

In 1822, Sir Robert Peel entered the cabinet as home secretary and in 1826 introduced a number of reforms to the English criminal law, which became known as Peel's Acts. This included efforts to modernise, consolidate and repeal provisions from a large number of earlier statutes, including:

- Benefit of Clergy
- Larceny and other Offences of Stealing
- Burglary, Robbery and Threats for the Purpose of Robbery or of Extortion
- Embezzlement, False Pretences, and the Receipt of Stolen Property
- Malicious Injuries to Property
- Remedies against the Hundred

In 1827, several acts were passed for this purpose, territorially limited to England and Wales and Scotland, including:

- Criminal Statutes Repeal Act 1827 (7 & 8 Geo. 4. c. 27), which repealed for England and Wales over 140 enactments relating to the criminal law.
- Criminal Law Act 1827 (7 & 8 Geo. 4. c. 28), which modernised the administration of criminal justice.
- Larceny Act 1827 (7 & 8 Geo. 4. c. 29), which consolidated provisions in the law relating to larceny.
- Malicious Injuries to Property Act 1827 (7 & 8 Geo. 4. c. 30), which consolidated provisions in the law relating to malicious injuries to property.

In 1828, parallel bills for Ireland to Peel's Acts were introduced, becoming:

- Criminal Statutes (Ireland) Repeal Act 1828 (9 Geo. 4. 54), which repealed for Ireland over 140 enactments relating to the English criminal law.
- Criminal Law (Ireland) Act 1828 (9 Geo. 4. 54), which modernised the administration of criminal justice
- Larceny (Ireland) Act 1828 (9 Geo. 4. c. 55) which consolidated provisions in the law relating to larceny.
- Malicious Injuries to Property (Ireland) Act 1828 (9 Geo. 4. c. 56), which consolidated provisions in the law relating to malicious injuries to property.

In 1828, the Offences Against the Person Act 1828 (9 Geo. 4. c. 31) was passed, which consolidated provisions in the law relating to offences against the person and repealed for England and Wales almost 60 enactments relating to the Criminal law. In 1829, the Offences Against the Person (Ireland) Act 1829 (10 Geo. 4. c. 34) was passed, which consolidated provisions in the law relating to offences against the person and repealed for Ireland almost 60 enactments relating to the Criminal law.

== Passage ==
Leave to bring in the Criminal Justice (India) Bill was granted to Charles Williams-Wynn MP, Anthony Ashley-Cooper, 7th Earl of Shaftesbury MP, Sir James Mackintosh MP, Sir Edward Hyde East MP, William Fergusson MP and William Astell MP on 4 June 1828. The bill had its first reading in the House of Commons on 6 June 1828, presented by Charles Williams-Wynn MP. The bill had its second reading in the House of Commons on 17 June 1828 and was committed to a committee of the whole house, which met and reported on 24 June 1828, with amendments. The amended Bill was considered by the House of Commons on 7 July 1828 and re-committed to a committee of the whole house, which met and reported on 7 July 1828, with amendments. The bill had its third reading in the House of Commons on 10 July 1828.

The amended bill had its first reading in the House of Lords on 11 July 1828. The bill had its second reading in the House of Lords on 15 July 1828 and was committed to a committee of the whole house, which met and reported on 16 July 1828, without amendment. The bill had its third reading in the House of Lords on 17 July 1828, with amendment.

The amended bill was considered and agreed to by the House of Commons on 22 July 1828.

The bill was granted royal assent on 25 July 1828.

== Provisions ==
=== Repealed enactments ===
Section 125 of the act repealed for India all enactments repealed by the Criminal Statutes Repeal Act 1827 (7 & 8 Geo. 4 c. 27) and the Offences Against the Person Act 1828 (9 Geo. 4. c. 31), effective on 1 March 1829.

== Subsequent developments ==
The whole act was repealed by section 1 of, and the schedule to, the Statute Law Revision Act 1964, which came into force on 31 July 1964.

== See also ==
- Statute Law Revision Act
