= Larceny (Advertisements) Act 1870 =

Act of the Parliament of the United Kingdom

Larceny (Advertisements) Act 1870 (Note: Section 1.)
- Act of Parliament
- Parliament of the United Kingdom
- Long title: An Act to amend the Law relating to Advertisements respecting Stolen Goods.
- Citation: 33 & 34 Vict. c. 65
- Territorial extent: United Kingdom

Dates
- Royal assent: 9 August 1870
- Commencement: 9 August 1870 (Note: The Acts of Parliament (Commencement) Act 1793.)
- Repealed: England and Wales: 1 January 1969; Northern Ireland: 1 August 1969
Other legislation
Amended by	Statute Law Revision Act 1883
Repealed by	England and Wales and Scotland: Theft Act 1968; Northern Ireland: Theft Act (Northern Ireland) 1969
Relates to	Larceny Act 1861

Status: Repealed

Text of statute as originally enacted

The Larceny (Advertisements) Act 1870 (33 & 34 Vict. c. 65) was an act of the Parliament of the United Kingdom. According to its preamble, the purpose of this act was to discourage vexatious proceedings, at the instance of common informers, against printers and publishers of newspapers, under section 102 of the Larceny Act 1861 (24 & 25 Vict. c. 96).

== Provisions ==
=== Section 1 - Short title ===
Section 1 of the act authorised the citation of the act, and the Larceny Act 1861 (24 & 25 Vict. c. 96), by their short titles, and by a collective title.

=== Section 2 - Definition of "newspaper" ===
Section 2 of the act provided that:

In this Act the term "newspaper" means a newspaper as defined for the purposes of the Acts for the time being in force relating to the carriage of newspapers by post.

=== Section 3 - Limitation of actions for advertisements of reward for return of stolen property ===
Section 3 of the act read:

Every action against the printer or publisher of a newspaper to recover a forfeiture under section one hundred and two of The Larceny Act, 1861, shall be brought within six months after the forfeiture is incurred, and no such action against the printer or publisher of a newspaper shall be incurred, and no such action shall be brought unless the assent in writing of Her Majesty's Attorney General or Solicitor General for England, if the action is brought in England, or for Ireland, if the action is brought in Ireland, has been first obtained to the bringing of such action.

== Subsequent developments ==
Section 4 of the act was repealed by section 1 of, and the schedule to, the Statute Law Revision Act 1878 (46 & 47 Vict. c. 39), which came into force on 25 August 1883.

The whole act was repealed for England and Wales and Scotland by section 33(3) of, and part II of schedule 3 to, the Theft Act 1968 (c. 60), which came into force on 1 January 1969.

The whole act was repealed for Northern Ireland by section 31(2) of, and part I of schedule 3 to, the Theft Act (Northern Ireland) 1969 (c. 16), which came into force on 1 August 1969.

The act was retained for the Republic of Ireland by section 2(2)(a) of, and part 4 of schedule 1 to, the Statute Law Revision Act 2007, which came into force on 8 May 2007.

== See also ==
- Larceny Act
