= Larceny Act 1827 =

Act of the Parliament of the United Kingdom

- Act of Parliament
- Parliament of the United Kingdom
- Long title: An Act for consolidating and amending the Laws in England relative to Larceny and other Offences connected therewith.
- Citation: 7 & 8 Geo. 4. c. 29
- Territorial extent: England and Wales (Note: Section 76.)

Dates
- Royal assent: 21 June 1827
- Commencement: 1 July 1827 (Note: Section 1.)
- Repealed: 1 November 1861
Other legislation
| Amended by | Criminal Law Act 1833 |
| Repealed by | Criminal Statutes Repeal Act 1861 |
| Relates to | Peel's Acts; Criminal Statutes Repeal Act 1827; Criminal Law (Ireland) Act 1828; Larceny (Ireland) Act 1828; Criminal Law (India) Act 1828; Criminal Law Consolidation Acts 1861 |

Status: Repealed

Text of statute as originally enacted

The Larceny Act 1827 (7 & 8 Geo. 4. c. 29) was an act of the Parliament of the United Kingdom that consolidated enactments related to larceny in England and Wales.

The act was one of Peel's Acts which consolidated, repealed and replaced a large number of existing statutes. The enactments replaced by the act were repealed by the Criminal Statutes Repeal Act 1827 (7 & 8 Geo. 4. c. 27).

Similar provisions were made for Ireland by the Larceny (Ireland) Act 1828 (9 Geo. 4. c. 55).

== Background ==
In the United Kingdom, acts of Parliament remain in force until expressly repealed. Blackstone's Commentaries on the Laws of England, published in the late 18th-century, raised questions about the system and structure of the common law and the poor drafting and disorder of the existing statute book.

In 1806, the Commission on Public Records passed a resolution requesting the production of a report on the best mode of reducing the volume of the statute book. From 1810 to 1825, The Statutes of the Realm was published, providing for the first time the authoritative collection of acts. In 1816, both Houses of Parliament, passed resolutions that an eminent lawyer with 20 clerks be commissioned to make a digest of the statutes, which was declared "very expedient to be done." However, this was never done.

In 1822, Sir Robert Peel entered the cabinet as home secretary and in 1826 introduced a number of reforms to the English criminal law, which became known as Peel's Acts. This included efforts to modernise, consolidate and repeal provisions from a large number of earlier statutes, including:

- Benefit of Clergy
- Larceny and other Offences of Stealing
- Burglary, Robbery and Threats for the Purpose of Robbery or of Extortion
- Embezzlement, False Pretences, and the Receipt of Stolen Property
- Malicious Injuries to Property
- Remedies against the Hundred

== Subsequent developments ==
In 1827, Peel's Acts were passed to modernise, consolidate and repeal provisions of the criminal law of England and Wales, including:

- The Criminal Statutes Repeal Act 1827 (7 & 8 Geo. 4. c. 27), which repealed over 140 enactments relating to the criminal law.
- The Criminal Law Act 1827 (7 & 8 Geo. 4. c. 28), which modernised the administration of criminal justice.
- The Larceny Act 1827 (7 & 8 Geo. 4. c. 29), which consolidated enactments relating to larceny.
- The Malicious Injuries to Property Act 1827 (7 & 8 Geo. 4. c. 30), which consolidated enactments relating to malicious injuries to property.
- The Remedies Against the Hundred (England) Act 1827 (7 & 8 Geo. 4. c. 31), which consolidated enactments relating to remedies against the hundred.

In 1828, parallel bills for Ireland to Peel's Acts were introduced, becoming:

- The Criminal Statutes (Ireland) Repeal Act 1828 (9 Geo. 4. 54), which repealed for Ireland over 140 enactments relating to the English criminal law.
- The Criminal Law (Ireland) Act 1828 (9 Geo. 4. 54), which modernised the administration of criminal justice
- The Larceny (Ireland) Act 1828 (9 Geo. 4. c. 55) which consolidated provisions in the law relating to larceny.
- The Malicious Injuries to Property (Ireland) Act 1828 (9 Geo. 4. c. 56), which consolidated provisions in the law relating to malicious injuries to property.

In 1828, the Offences Against the Person Act 1828 (9 Geo. 4. c. 31) was passed, which consolidated enactments relating to offences against the person and repealed for England and Wales almost 60 related enactments. In 1829, the Offences Against the Person (Ireland) Act 1829 (10 Geo. 4. c. 34) was passed, which consolidated enactments relating to offences against the person and repealed for Ireland almost 60 enactments relating to the criminal law of Ireland.

In 1861, bills were introduced, drafted by Charles Sprengel Greaves to mirror Peel's Acts, to consolidate and modernise the criminal law across:

- Offences Against the Person
- Malicious Injuries to Property
- Larceny
- Forgery
- Coining
- Accessories and Abettors

In 1861, the Criminal Consolidation Acts were passed for that purpose:

- The Accessories and Abettors Act 1861 (24 & 25 Vict. c. 94), which modernised provisions in the law relating to Aiding and abetting.
- The Criminal Statutes Repeal Act 1861 (24 & 25 Vict. c. 95), which repealed for England and Wales and Ireland over 100 enactments relating to the criminal law.
- The Larceny Act 1861 (24 & 25 Vict. c. 96), which modernised provisions in the law relating to larceny.
- The Malicious Damage Act 1861 (24 & 25 Vict. c. 97), which modernised provisions in the law relating to malicious injury to property.
- The Forgery Act 1861 (24 & 25 Vict. c. 98), which modernised provisions in the law relating to forgery.
- The Coinage Offences Act 1861 (24 & 25 Vict. c. 99), which modernised provisions in the law relating to coinage.
- The Offences Against the Person Act 1861 (24 & 25 Vict. c. 100), which modernised provisions in the law relating to offences against the person.

=== Repeal ===
So much of the Irish act as related to the jurisdiction of Justices of the Peace as to summary convictions was repealed by section 60 of the Summary Jurisdiction (Ireland) Act 1850 (13 & 14 Vict. c. 102), which came into force on 1 October 1850.

The whole of the English and Irish acts were repealed by section 1 of, and the schedule to, the Criminal Statutes Repeal Act 1861 (24 & 25 Vict. c. 95), which came into force on 1 November 1861.
