= R v Betts and Ridley =

1930 English criminal law case

- Decided: 1930
- Citation: 22 Cr App R 148

R v Betts and Ridley (1930) 22 Cr App R 148 was a 1930 landmark case in English criminal law which established that to be convicted of a crime under the doctrine of common purpose, it was not necessary for the accessory to be present or within sight when the offence was carried out.

== Facts ==
Victor Betts and Herbert Ridley agreed to rob a man, William Thomas Andrews, as he was on his way to the bank. Their plan was that Betts would take the man to the ground and snatch his bag. Meanwhile, Ridley would be waiting around the corner in a getaway car, which he had used to help Betts reach the scene.

Betts struck Andrews with such force with proven intent to cause serious bodily harm, that he died. Ridley was charged with aiding and abetting murder and of being an accessory before the act, which, if proven, carried the same default sentence.

== Judgment ==
The law was considered by the trial judge who gave appropriate jury instructions. One was convicted of murder, the other of aiding and abetting the murder and, in the alternative, of being an accessory before the act with intention to remain an accessory, after the fact.

The appeal to the Court of Appeal by both men was dismissed.

=== Sentencing ===
Both were sentenced to death. However, the Home Secretary advised the King to commute the death sentence in the case of Ridley to life imprisonment. Betts was subsequently hanged.

==== Execution of Betts ====
Despite a petition with 12,000 signatures, Betts was hanged at Birmingham Prison on 3 January 1931 by Thomas Pierrepoint. A crowd of several hundred people gathered as a nearby factory sounded its whistle to mark the execution.

== See also ==
- Accessories and Abettors Act 1861
- Homicide Act 1957
- Derek Bentley
