= Criminal Statutes Repeal Act 1861 =

Act of the Parliament of the United Kingdom

- Act of Parliament
- Parliament of the United Kingdom
- Long title: An Act to repeal certain Enactments which have been consolidated in several Acts of the present Session relating to indictable Offences and other Matters.
- Citation: 24 & 25 Vict. c. 95
- Introduced by: Sir John Coleridge MP (Commons); Richard Bethell, 1st Baron Westbury (Lords)
- Territorial extent: England and Wales; Ireland; (Note: Section 1.)

Dates
- Royal assent: 6 August 1861
- Commencement: 1 November 1861 (Note: Section 1.)
- Repealed: 23 May 1950
Other legislation
Amends	See § Repealed enactments
Repeals/revokes	See § Repealed enactments
Repealed by	Statute Law Revision Act 1950
Relates to	Repeal of Obsolete Statutes Act 1856; Criminal Statutes Repeal Act 1827; Statute Law Revision Act 1861; Accessories and Abettors Act 1861; Larceny Act 1861; Malicious Damage Act 1861; Forgery Act 1861; Coinage Offences Act 1861; Offences Against the Person Act 1861

Status: Repealed

History of passage through Parliament

Records of Parliamentary debate relating to the statute from Hansard

Text of statute as originally enacted

The Criminal Statutes Repeal Act 1861 (24 & 25 Vict. c. 95) was an act of the Parliament of the United Kingdom that repealed for England and Wales and Ireland enactments relating to the English criminal law from 1634 to 1860. The act was intended, in particular, to facilitate the preparation of a revised edition of the statutes.

The act was one of the Criminal Law Consolidation Acts 1861, which consolidated, repealed and replaced a large number of existing statutes.

== Background ==
In the United Kingdom, acts of Parliament remain in force until expressly repealed. Blackstone's Commentaries on the Laws of England, published in the late 18th-century, raised questions about the system and structure of the common law and the poor drafting and disorder of the existing statute book.

In 1806, the Commission on Public Records passed a resolution requesting the production of a report on the best mode of reducing the volume of the statute book. From 1810 to 1825, The Statutes of the Realm was published, providing for the first time the authoritative collection of acts. In 1816, both Houses of Parliament, passed resolutions that an eminent lawyer with 20 clerks be commissioned to make a digest of the statutes, which was declared "very expedient to be done." However, this was never done.

In 1826 the Home Secretary, Sir Robert Peel, introduced a number of reforms to the English criminal law, which became known as Peel's Acts. This included efforts to modernise, consolidate and repeal provisions from a large number of earlier statutes, including:

- Benefit of clergy
- Larceny and other offences of stealing
- Burglary, robbery and threats for the purpose of robbery or of extortion
- Embezzlement, false pretences, and the receipt of stolen property
- Malicious injuries to property
- Remedies against the hundred

In 1827, several acts were passed for this purpose, territorially limited to England and Wales and Scotland, including:

- Criminal Statutes Repeal Act 1827 (7 & 8 Geo. 4. c. 27), which repealed for England and Wales over 140 enactments relating to the criminal law.
- Criminal Law Act 1827 (7 & 8 Geo. 4. c. 28), which modernised the administration of criminal justice.
- Larceny Act 1827 (7 & 8 Geo. 4. c. 29), which consolidated provisions in the law relating to larceny.
- Malicious Injuries to Property Act 1827 (7 & 8 Geo. 4. c. 30), which consolidated provisions in the law relating to malicious injuries to property.

In 1828, parallel bills for Ireland to Peel's Acts were introduced, becoming:

- Criminal Statutes (Ireland) Repeal Act 1828 (9 Geo. 4. 54), which repealed for Ireland over 140 enactments relating to the criminal law.
- Criminal Law (Ireland) Act 1828 (9 Geo. 4. 54), which modernised the administration of criminal justice.
- Larceny (Ireland) Act 1828 (9 Geo. 4. c. 55) which consolidated provisions in the law relating to larceny.
- Malicious Injuries to Property (Ireland) Act 1828 (9 Geo. 4. c. 56), which consolidated provisions in the law relating to malicious injuries to property.

In 1828, the Offences Against the Person Act 1828 (9 Geo. 4. c. 31) was passed, which consolidated provisions in the law relating to offences against the person and repealed for England and Wales almost 60 enactments relating to the criminal law. In 1829, the Offences Against the Person (Ireland) Act 1829 (10 Geo. 4. c. 34) was passed, which consolidated provisions in the law relating to offences against the person and repealed for Ireland almost 60 enactments relating to the Criminal law.

In 1828, the Criminal Law (India) Act 1828 (9 Geo. 4. c. 74) was passed, which repealed for India offences repealed by the Criminal Statutes Repeal Act 1827 (7 & 8 Geo. 4. c. 27) the Offences Against the Person Act 1828 (9 Geo. 4. c. 31).

In 1830, the Forgery Act 1830 (11 Geo. 4 & 1 Will. 4. c. 66) was passed, which consolidated provisions in the law relating to forgery and repealed for England and Wales over 25 enactments relating to the criminal law.

At the start of the parliamentary session in 1853, Lord Cranworth announced his intention to the improvement of the statute law and in March 1853, appointed the Board for the Revision of the Statute Law to repeal expired statutes and continue consolidation, with a wider remit that included civil law. The Board issued three reports, recommending the creation of a permanent body for statute law reform.

In 1854, Lord Cranworth appointed the Royal Commission for Consolidating the Statute Law to consolidate existing statutes and enactments of English law. The Commission made four reports.

An alternative approach, focusing on expunging obsolete laws from the statute book, followed by consolidation, was proposed by Peter Locke King MP, who was heavily critical of the expenditure of the Commission and the lack of results. This approach was taken by the Repeal of Obsolete Statutes Act 1856 (19 & 20 Vict. c. 64), considered to be the first Statute Law Revision Act.

On 17 February 1860, the Attorney General, Sir Richard Bethell told the House of Commons that he had engaged Sir Francis Reilly and A. J. Wood to expurgate the statute book of all acts which, though not expressly repealed, were not in force, working backwards from the present time.

In 1861, bills were introduced to consolidate and modernise the criminal law, drafted by Charles Sprengel Greaves across:

- Offences Against the Person
- Malicious Injuries to Property
- Larceny
- Forgery
- Coining
- Accessories and Abettors

== Passage ==
Leave to bring in the Criminal Statutes Repeal Bill alongside the other Law Criminal Consolidation Bills was granted on 14 February 1861 and the bill had its first reading in the House of Commons on 14 February 1861, introduced by the solicitor general, Sir John Coleridge MP. In his speech introducing the bill, Sir John Coleridge MP emphasised that the purpose of the bill was to consolidate abolishing the enactments for which the other six, if passed, would become the substitutes and not to consolidate common law. In response, Patrick McMahon MP suggested consolidation of the criminal law of England, Ireland and Scotland.

The bill had its second reading in the House of Commons, and was committed to a Select Committee. The Select Committee on the Offences against the Person Bill, the Larceny, &c. Bill, the Malicious Injuries to Property Bill, the Forgery Bill, the Coinage Offences Bill, the Accessories and Abettors Bill, and the Criminal Statutes Repeal Bill was appointed on 25 February 1861, consisting of 30 members. The select committee reported with amendments on 2 May 1861. The amended bill was committed to a Committee of the Whole House which met and reported on 11 June 1861, without amendment. The bill had its third reading in the House of Commons on 17 June 1861.

The bill had its first reading in the House of Lords on 18 June 1861. The bill had its second reading in the House of Lords on 30 July 1861, introduced by the Lord Chancellor, Richard Bethell, 1st Baron Westbury. The bill was supported by Robert Rolfe, 1st Baron Cranworth. The bill was committed to a Committee of the Whole House, which met and reported on 31 July 1861, without amendment. The bill had its third reading in the House of Lords on 2 August 1861.

The bill was granted royal assent on 6 August 1861.

== Subsequent developments ==
In 1861, the Criminal Law Consolidation Acts were passed:

- Accessories and Abettors Act 1861 (24 & 25 Vict. c. 94)
- Criminal Statutes Repeal Act 1861 (24 & 25 Vict. c. 95)
- Larceny Act 1861 (24 & 25 Vict. c. 96)
- Malicious Damage Act 1861 (24 & 25 Vict. c. 97)
- Forgery Act 1861 (24 & 25 Vict. c. 98)
- Coinage Offences Act 1861 (24 & 25 Vict. c. 99)
- Offences Against the Person Act 1861 (24 & 25 Vict. c. 100)

According to George Oke, the Act "should have been the last Act of the series to receive the Royal Assent, and have been numbered accordingly".

In 1861, the Statute Law Revision Act 1861 (24 & 25 Vict. c. 101) was passed, which repealed over 800 enactments relating to the civil law.

The territorial terms of the act led to several acts being for the avoidance of doubt for Scotland repealed by later Statute Law Revision Acts, including:

- Statute Law Revision Act 1874 (37 & 38 Vict. c. 35)
- Statute Law Revision Act 1892 (55 & 56 Vict. c. 19)

The whole act was repealed as spent by section 1(1) of, and the first schedule to, the Statute Law Revision Act 1950 (14 Geo. 6. c. 6), which came into force on 23 May 1950.

The whole act was repealed for the Republic of Ireland by sections 2(1) and 3(1) of, and part 4 of schedule 2 to, the Statute Law Revision Act 2007, which came into force on 8 May 2007.

== Repealed enactments ==
Section 1 of the act repealed 106 enactments of the Parliament of England, Parliament of Great Britain, Parliament of Ireland and the Parliament of the United Kingdom, listed in the schedule to the act, effective 1 November 1861. The territorial extent of the repeals was limited to the United Kingdom, excluding Scotland (i.e., England and Wales and Ireland).

Section 2 of the act provided that acts extended to any part of Her Majesty's Dominions outside of the United Kingdom would not be repealed for those territories.

Section 3 of the act provided that for offences and other matters committed or done before or on the last day of October 1861, the repealed acts would still apply as if the act had not been passed.

Section 4 of the act provided that the repeals would not affect any existing authority to alter or amend the register of births, baptisms, marriages, deaths or burials.

== See also ==
- Statute Law Revision Act

== Bibliography ==
- James Edward Davis. The Criminal Law Consolidation Statutes of the 24 & 25 of Victoria, Chapters 94 to 100: Edited with Notes, Critical and Explanatory. Butterworths. 1861. Pages v to xviii (introduction) and pp. 7 to 19 (complete annotated text of the Act) (from Google Books).
- Francis Towers Streeten and Edward Alfred Hadley. An Analytical Digest of the Cases Reported and Published from Trinity Term 1860 to Michaelmas Term 1865, and contained in the Law Journal Reports, and other contemporary Reports; with References to Statutes Passed within the Same Period. Edward Bret Ince. London. 1868. Page 579 et seq.
