= Criminal Law Consolidation Acts 1861 =

1861 set of 6 Acts of the U.K. Parliament (24 & 25 Vict. cc. 94 – 100)

The Criminal Law Consolidation Acts 1861 (24 & 25 Vict. cc. 94–100) were Acts of the Parliament of the United Kingdom that consolidated provisions from a large number of earlier statutes which were then repealed. Their purpose was to simplify the criminal law. There were six consolidation Acts and a further Act which effected consequential repeals.

They are essentially revised versions of an earlier set of consolidation Acts, commonly known as Peel's Acts, incorporating subsequent statutes.

They were drafted by Charles Sprengel Greaves.

== List of acts ==
- Accessories and Abettors Act 1861 (24 & 25 Vict. c. 94)
- Criminal Statutes Repeal Act 1861 (24 & 25 Vict. c. 95)
- Larceny Act 1861 (24 & 25 Vict. c. 96)
- Malicious Damage Act 1861 (24 & 25 Vict. c. 97)
- Forgery Act 1861 (24 & 25 Vict. c. 98)
- Coinage Offences Act 1861 (24 & 25 Vict. c. 99)
- Offences Against the Person Act 1861 (24 & 25 Vict. c. 100)

Of these statutes, the Criminal Statutes Repeal Act, the Larceny Act and the Coinage Offences Act have been repealed in England and Wales. The majority of the provisions of Accessories and Abettors Act, the Malicious Damage Act and the Forgery Act have been repealed and the last two have been practically superseded by codification Acts. However, the bulk of the Offences Against the Person Act remains in force.

== Interpretation ==
=== Internal evidence of meaning by comparison of enactments ===
In his commentary on these Acts, their draftsman said:

If any question should arise in which any comparison may be instituted between different sections of any one or several of these Acts, it must be carefully borne in mind in what manner these Acts were framed. None of them was re-written; on the contrary, each contains enactments taken from different Acts passed at different times and with different views, and frequently varying from each other in phraseology, and ... these enactments, for the most part, stand in these Acts with little or no variation in their phraseology, and, consequently, their differences in that respect will be found generally to remain in these Acts. It follows, therefore, from hence, that any argument as to a difference in the intention of the legislature, which may be drawn from a difference in the terms of one clause from those in another, will be entitled to no weight in the construction of such clauses; for that argument can only apply with force where an Act is framed from beginning to end with one and the same view, and with the intention of making it thoroughly consistent throughout.

This passage was cited and approved by Lord Steyn in R v Burstow, R v Ireland [1997] UKHL 34 (this case related to the significance of the appearance of "cause" and "inflict" respectively in sections 18 and 20 of the Offences against the Person Act 1861).

== Common features ==
=== Short titles ===
None of these Acts was originally provided with a short title. The short titles (except that of c. 95, which is unofficial) were conferred by the Short Titles Act 1896.

== Passage through Parliament ==
- Hansard (House of Lords), 17 April 1860, vol.157, col. 1873 (nomination of select committee)
- Hansard (House of Lords), 7 May 1860, vol.158, col. 747 (report of select committee)
- Hansard (House of Lords), 10 May 1860, vol.158, col. 999 - 1001 (committee)

== Derivative legislation ==
The Canadian criminal law consolidation Acts of 1869 were based on the criminal law consolidation Acts 1861, and taken almost textually from them.

The Tasmanian Acts 27 Vict. Nos. 5 - 10 were framed from the Imperial Acts 24 & 25 Vict c 94 and cc 96 - 100.
