= Criminal Law (Ireland) Act 1828 =

Act of the Parliament of the United Kingdom

Criminal Law (Ireland) Act 1828 (Note: The citation of this act by this short title was authorised by section 1 of, and the first schedule to, the Short Titles Act 1896. Due to the repeal of those provisions it is now authorised by section 19(2) of the Interpretation Act 1978.)
- Act of Parliament
- Parliament of the United Kingdom
- Long title: An Act for improving the Administration of Justice in Criminal Cases in Ireland.
- Citation: 9 Geo. 4. c. 54
- Territorial extent: Ireland (Note: Section 36.)

Dates
- Royal assent: 15 July 1828
- Commencement: 1 September 1828
- Repealed: 31 July 1964
Other legislation
Amended by	Capital Punishment (Ireland) Act 1842; Indictable Offences (Ireland) Act 1849; Criminal Statutes Repeal Act 1861; Statute Law Revision Act 1873; Interpretation Act 1889
Repealed by	Statute Law Revision Act 1964
Relates to	Criminal Statutes (Ireland) Repeal Act 1828; Criminal Law Act 1827

Status: Repealed

Text of statute as originally enacted

The Criminal Law (Ireland) Act 1828 (9 Geo. 4. c. 54) was an act of the Parliament of the United Kingdom that modernised the administration of criminal justice in Ireland. It was the Irish counterpart of the Criminal Law Act 1827 (7 & 8 Geo. 4. c. 28), which applied to England and Wales, and was one of the acts passed in 1828 to extend Peel's reforms of the criminal law to Ireland.

== Subsequent developments ==
The whole act was repealed by section 1 of, and the schedule to, the Statute Law Revision Act 1964, which came into force on 31 July 1964.
