= Larceny Act 1861 =

Act of the Parliament of the United Kingdom

Larceny Act 1861 (Note: The citation of this act by this short title was authorised by section 1 of, and the first schedule to, the Short Titles Act 1896. This short title was previously authorised by section 1 of the Larceny (Advertisements) Act 1870 (33 & 34 Vict. c. 65). Due to the repeal of those provisions it is now authorised by section 19(2) of the Interpretation Act 1978.)
- Act of Parliament
- Parliament of the United Kingdom
- Long title: An Act to consolidate and amend the Statute Law of England and Ireland relating to Larceny and other similar Offences.
- Citation: 24 & 25 Vict. c. 96
- Territorial extent: England and Wales; Ireland; (Note: Section 122.)

Dates
- Royal assent: 6 August 1861
- Commencement: 1 November 1861 (Note: Section 123.)
- Repealed: England and Wales: 1 January 1969; Northern Ireland: 1 August 1969
Other legislation
| Amended by | Public Authorities Protection Act 1893; Larceny Act 1901; Costs in Criminal Cases Act 1908; Indictments Act 1915; Larceny Act 1916; Criminal Justice Act 1948; Common Informers Act 1951; Criminal Law Act 1967; Justices of the Peace Act 1968 |
| Repealed by | England and Wales: Theft Act 1968; Northern Ireland: Theft Act (Northern Ireland) 1969 |
| Relates to | Larceny Act 1827; Larceny (Advertisements) Act 1870 |

Status: Repealed

Text of statute as originally enacted

The Larceny Act 1861 (24 & 25 Vict. c. 96) was an act of the Parliament of the United Kingdom that consolidated provisions related to larceny and similar offences from a number of earlier statutes into a single act. For the most part these provisions were, according to the draftsman of the act, incorporated with little or no variation in their phraseology. It is one of a group of acts sometimes referred to as the Criminal Law Consolidation Acts 1861. It was passed with the object of simplifying the law. It is essentially a revised version of an earlier consolidation act, the Larceny Act 1827 (7 & 8 Geo. 4. c. 29) (and the equivalent Irish act), incorporating subsequent statutes.

== Subsequent developments ==
Section 113 of the act was repealed by section 2 of, and the schedule to, the Public Authorities Protection Act 1893 (56 & 57 Vict. c. 61), which came into force on 1 January 1894.

The following provisions of the act were repealed by section 48(1) of, and the schedule to, the Larceny Act 1916.

In section 1, from " the term " 'trustee'" to "bankruptcy " or insolvency " ; and from " for the purposes of this Act, " the night" to " succeeding " day."
Sections 2–11, both inclusive.
In section 18, from " and " whosoever" to the end of the section.
In section 19, from "and " whosoever " to the end of the section.
Section 20.
In section 26, from the beginning of the section to " simple larceny and."
In section 27, the words " shall steal, or."
In section 28, the words " shall steal, or."
In section 29, the words, " steal or."
In section 30, the words " shall steal or."
Sections 31 and 32.
In section 33, from " and whosoever having been " twice convicted " to the end of the section.
In section 36, from " and " whosoever " to the end of the section.
Section 38.
Sections 40–64, both inclusive.
Sections 67–74, both inclusive.
Sections 77–81, both inclusive.
Sections 88 to 96, both inclusive.
In section 98, the words " except only a receiver of stolen " property."
Sections 100 and 101.
Section 114.

Section 87 of the act was repealed for England and Wales by section 10(2) of, and part II of schedule 3 to, the Criminal Law Act 1967, which came into force on 1 January 1968.

The whole act was repealed for England and Wales by section 33(3) of, and part I of schedule 3 to, the Theft Act 1968, which came into force on 1 January 1969.

The whole act was repealed for Northern Ireland by section 31(2) of, and part I of schedule 3 to, the Theft Act (Northern Ireland) 1969, which came into force on 1 August 1969.

The act was retained for the Republic of Ireland by section 2(2)(a) of, and part 4 of schedule 1 to, the Statute Law Revision Act 2007, which came into force on 8 May 2007. Sections 12, 16, 24 and 25 continue in force.

== Provisions ==
Section 2 - All larcenies to be of the same nature

Davis said that the marginal note to section 2 of the act ("all larcenies to be of the same nature") was "imperfect" and that this was "obvious".

=== As to sacrilege, burglary and housebreaking ===
Section 50 - Breaking and entering a church or chapel and committing any felony

See sacrilege.

=== As to restitution and recovery of stolen property ===
Section 102 - Advertising a reward for the return of stolen property etc.

Provision was made in relation to section 102 of the act by sections 3 and 4 of the Larceny (Advertisements) Act 1870 (33 & 34 Vict. c. 65) and by the Common Informers Act 1951 (14 & 15 Geo. 6. c. 39).

This section is replaced for England and Wales by section 23 of the Theft Act 1968.

== Subsequent developments ==
Section 117 of the act was repealed for England and Wales by section 8(2) of, and part II of schedule 5 to, the Justices of the Peace Act 1968, which came into force on 1 February 1969.

== See also ==
- Larceny Act
