= Accessories and Abettors Act 1861 =

Act of the Parliament of the United Kingdom

Accessories and Abettors Act 1861 (Note: The citation of this act by this short title was authorised by section 1 of, and the first schedule to, the Short Titles Act 1896. Due to the repeal of those provisions it is now authorised by section 19(2) of the Interpretation Act 1978.)
- Act of Parliament
- Parliament of the United Kingdom
- Long title: An Act to consolidate and amend the Statute Law of England and Ireland relating to Accessories to and Abettors of indictable Offences.
- Citation: 24 & 25 Vict. c. 94
- Territorial extent: England and Wales; Ireland; (Note: Section 10.)

Dates
- Royal assent: 6 August 1861
- Commencement: 1 November 1861 (Note: Section 11.)
Other legislation
Amended by	Statute Law Revision Act 1892; Criminal Law Act 1967; Criminal Law Act 1967; Criminal Law Act (Northern Ireland) 1967; Criminal Law Act 1977

Status: Partially repealed

Text of statute as originally enacted

Revised text of statute as amended

Text of the Accessories and Abettors Act 1861 as in force today (including any amendments) within the United Kingdom, from legislation.gov.uk.

The Accessories and Abettors Act 1861 (24 & 25 Vict. c. 94) is an act of the Parliament of the United Kingdom that consolidated statutory English criminal law related to accomplices, including many classes of encouragers (inciters). Mainly its offences were, according to the draftsman of the act, replacement enactments with little or no variation in phraseology. It is one of a group of acts sometimes referred to as the Criminal Law Consolidation Acts 1861. It was passed with the object of simplifying the law. It collected the relevant parts of Peel's Acts (and the equivalent Irish Acts) and others.

== Provisions still in force ==
The act provides that an accessory to an indictable offence shall be treated in the same way as if he had committed the offence:

Section 8 of the act, as amended, reads:

Whosoever shall aid, abet, counsel, or procure the commission of any indictable offence, whether the same be an offence at common law or by virtue of any Act passed or to be passed, shall be liable to be tried, indicted, and punished as a principal offender.

Section 10 states that the act does not apply to Scotland. The active section thus applies to England, Northern Ireland and Wales.

The rest of the act was repealed by the Criminal Law Act 1967 to make easier the abolition of the distinction between felonies and misdemeanours; (see below).

=== Case law ===
In AG's Reference (No 1 of 1975) (1975) QB 773, Lord Chief Justice Widgery stated that the words in section 8 should be given their ordinary meaning.

- The natural meaning of "to aid" is to "give help, support or assistance to" and it will generally although not necessarily take place at the scene of the crime. It is not necessary to prove that there was any agreement between the principal and the alleged accessory, nor is there a need to prove a causative link between the aid and the commission of the offence by the principal.
- The natural meaning of "to abet" is "to incite, instigate or encourage" and this can only be committed by an accessory who is present when the crime is committed. This does imply either an express or implied agreement between the parties although there is no need to prove any causative link between what the abettor did and the commission of the offence.
- "To counsel" is "to encourage" and most usually covers advice, information, encouragement or the supply of equipment before the commission of a crime. It implies agreement with the principal. In R v Clarkson (1971) 3 AER 344, the defendant merely watched while fellow soldiers raped a woman in their barracks in Germany. Counselling or advising must have an effect on the mind of the principal to constitute the necessary encouragement in fact, so Clarkson was found not guilty. No causative link between the counselling and the commission of the full offence is required so long as the offence committed was within the scope of the counselling. In R v Calhaem (1985) 2 AER 266, the defendant paid a private detective to murder a woman and was charged with counselling or procuring the murder. It was held that the offence committed must be within the scope of the counselling, i.e., the principal does not deliberately depart from the plan. The detective merely intended to frighten the woman but hit her with a hammer. If, however, the accessory is sufficiently vague as to committing of crime the accessory will not face liability.
- "To procure" means "to produce by endeavour, by setting out to see that it happens and taking the appropriate steps to produce that happening". The principal can be entirely "innocent" of the procurer's acts so long as there is proof of a causal link between the procuring and the commission of the offence by the principal offender, e.g., as in AG’s Reference (No 1) (1975) 2 AER 684, spiking a drink procures a drunk-driving offence.

=== Summary offences ===
The act does not apply to summary offences, but section 44(1) of the Magistrates' Courts Act 1980 is to the like effect:

A person who aids, abets, counsels or procures the commission by another person of a summary offence shall be guilty of the like offence...

== Repeals ==
Section 11 of the act was repealed by section 1 of, and the schedule to, the Statute Law Revision Act 1892 (55 & 56 Vict. c. 19).

Sections 1–7 and 9 of the act were repealed for England and Wales by section 10(2) of, and part III of schedule 3 to, the Criminal Law Act 1967, which came into force on 1 January 1968. They were repealed for Northern Ireland by section 15(2) of, and part II of schedule 2 to, the Criminal Law Act (Northern Ireland) 1967.

== See also ==
- R v Betts and Ridley (1930) 22 Cr App R 148, a landmark case which established that an accessory need not be present when the crime is committed to be regarded as such
- Aiding and abetting, a very similar law in the United States
- R v Gnango [2011] UKSC 59 (14 December 2011), a case in which the Supreme Court of the United Kingdom held that a person could be an accessory to their own murder.
