= Coinage Offences Act 1861 =

Act of the Parliament of the United Kingdom

Coinage Offences Act 1861 (Note: The citation of this act by this short title was authorised by section 1 of, and the first schedule to, the Short Titles Act 1896. Due to the repeal of those provisions it is now authorised by section 19(2) of the Interpretation Act 1978.)
- Act of Parliament
- Parliament of the United Kingdom
- Long title: An Act to consolidate and amend the Statute Law of the United Kingdom against Offences relating to the Coin.
- Citation: 24 & 25 Vict. c. 99
- Territorial extent: United Kingdom

Dates
- Royal assent: 6 August 1861
- Commencement: 1 November 1861 (Note: Section 43.)
- Repealed: 1 August 1936
Other legislation
Amended by	Summary Jurisdiction Act 1884; Public Authorities Protection Act 1893; Costs in Criminal Cases Act 1908; Indictments Act 1915
Repealed by	Coinage Offences Act 1936

Status: Repealed

Text of statute as originally enacted

The Coinage Offences Act 1861 (24 & 25 Vict. c. 99) was an act of the Parliament of the United Kingdom which codified various coinage offences. It was repealed and replaced by the Coinage Offences Act 1936 (26 Geo. 5 & 1 Edw. 8. c. 16).

The statute provides that whoever falsely makes or counterfeits any coin resembling or apparently intended to resemble or pass for any current gold or silver coin of the realm (s. 2), or gilds, silvers, washes, cases over or colours with materials capable of producing the appearance of gold or silver a coin or a piece of any metal or mixture of metals, or files or alters it, with intent to make it resemble or pass for any current gold or silver coin (s. 3), or who buys, sells, receives or pays a false gold or silver coin at a lower rate than its denomination imports, or who receives into the United Kingdom any false coin knowing it to be counterfeit (ss. 6, 7), or who, without lawful authority or excuse, knowingly makes or mends, buys or sells, or has in his custody or possession, or conveys out of the Royal Mint any coining moulds, machines or tools, is guilty of felony (ss. 24, 25). The punishment for such offences is either penal servitude for life or for not less than three years, or imprisonment for not more than two years, with or without hard labour. Whoever impairs, diminishes or lightens current gold or silver coin, with intent to pass same, is liable to penal servitude for from three to fourteen years (s. 4), and whoever has in his possession filings or clippings obtained by impairing or lightening current coin is liable to the same punishment, or to penal servitude for from three to seven years.

The statute also makes provision against tendering or uttering false gold or silver coin, which is a misdemeanour, punishable by imprisonment with or without hard labour. Provision is also made with respect to falsely making, counterfeiting, tendering or uttering copper coin, exporting false coin, or defacing current coin by stamping names or words on it, and counterfeiting, tendering or uttering coin resembling or meant to pass as that of some foreign state.

The act applies to offences with respect to colonial coins as well as to those of the United Kingdom.

== Subsequent developments ==
Section 33 of the act was repealed by section 2 of, and the schedule to, the Public Authorities Protection Act 1893 (56 & 57 Vict. c. 61), which came into force on 1 January 1894.

The whole act was repealed by section 18(2) of, and the schedule to, the Coinage Offences Act 1936 (26 Geo. 5 & 1 Edw. 8. c. 16), which came into force on 1 August 1836.

== Bibliography ==
- Davis, James Edward, ed. (1861). The Criminal Law Consolidation Statutes of the 24 & 25 of Victoria, Chapter 94 to 100. London: Butterworth's. pp. 213–243.
