= Summary Jurisdiction (Ireland) Act 1851 =

Act of the Parliament of the United Kingdom

Summary Jurisdiction (Ireland) Act 1851 (Note: Section 29.)
- Act of Parliament
- Parliament of the United Kingdom
- Long title: An Act to consolidate and amend the Acts relating to certain Offences and other Matters as to which Justices of the Peace exercise Summary Jurisdiction in Ireland.
- Citation: 14 & 15 Vict. c. 92
- Territorial extent: Ireland (Note: Section 28.)

Dates
- Royal assent: 7 August 1851
- Commencement: 1 November 1851 (Note: Section 27.)
Other legislation
Repeals/revokes	See § Repealed enactments
Amended by	Statute Law Revision (Northern Ireland) Act 1980; Police and Criminal Evidence (Northern Ireland) Order 1989; Justice Act (Northern Ireland) 2015
Relates to	Petty Sessions (Ireland) Act 1851

Status: Partially repealed

Text of statute as originally enacted

The Summary Jurisdiction (Ireland) Act 1851 (14 & 15 Vict. c. 92) is an act of the Parliament of the United Kingdom that consolidated enactments relating to certain offences and other matters over which justices of the peace exercised summary jurisdiction in Ireland.

== Provisions ==
=== Repealed enactments ===
Section 26 of the act repealed 6 enactments, listed in that section. The repeal of the last of these, the Summary Jurisdiction (Ireland) Act 1850 (13 & 14 Vict. c. 102), was not to be deemed to revive any of the enactments it had itself repealed by its own section 60.

Citation	Short title	Description	Extent of repeal
10 Chas. 1 Sess. 2. c. 25 (I)	Impounding of Distresses Act 1634	An Act for the Impounding of Distresses.	The whole act.
37 Geo. 3. c. 36 (I)	Trespass of Cattle Act 1797	An Act to prevent the vexatious impounding of cattle for trespass or damage feasant, and for the more effectual preserving of meares and fences.	The whole act. (Note: The act was repealed by the Statute Law Revision (Ireland) Act 1879 (42 & 43 Vict. c. 24). The note to the bill states "Intended to be repealed by 14 & 15 Vict. c. 92. s. 20., but wrongly described therein as "An Act passed in the Thirty-seventh Year of King George the Third, chapter Twenty-seven, relating to the trespasses of Animals."")
40 Geo. 3. c. 71 (I)	Trespass of Cattle Act 1800	An Act for amending and rendering more effectual an Act passed in the Thirty-seventh Year of his present Majesty, entitled "An Act to prevent vexatious impounding of Cattle for Trespass or Damage Feasant, and for the effectual preserving of Meares and Fences."	The whole act.
6 Geo. 4. c. 43	Impounding of Distresses (Ireland) Act 1825	An Act to amend and render more effectual an Act made in the Tenth Year of the Reign of King Charles the First, for impounding of Distresses in Ireland.	The whole act. (Note: The act was repealed by the Statute Law Revision Act 1873 (36 & 37 Vict. c. 91). The note to the bill stated "Repealed by 14 & 15 Vict. c. 92, s. 26., but cited there as an Act of 5 Geo. 4.")
7 Geo. 4. c. 42	Impounding of Cattle (Ireland) Act 1826	An Act to amend the Laws in force in Ireland for preventing the vexatious Impounding of Cattle for Trespass or Damage feasant.	The whole act.
13 & 14 Vict. c. 102	Summary Jurisdiction (Ireland) Act 1850	An Act to consolidate and amend the Acts relating to certain Offences and other Matters as to which Justices of the Peace exercise a summary Jurisdiction in Ireland.	The whole act.

== Subsequent developments ==
Section 14 was amended by the Police and Criminal Evidence (Northern Ireland) Order 1989 (SI 1989/1341 (N.I. 12)), which substituted the words "If any offender" for the words from the beginning of paragraph 2 of that section to "any such person".

Section 1 was amended by the Justice Act (Northern Ireland) 2015 (c. 9 (N.I.)), which omitted the words "within his or their respective jurisdictions" and "(when the case shall be heard in any petty sessions district)", by virtue of paragraph 21 of schedule 1 to, and part 1 of schedule 9 to, that act, which came into operation on 31 October 2016.
