= List of acts of the Parliament of the United Kingdom from 1849 =

This is a complete list of acts of the Parliament of the United Kingdom for the year 1849.

Note that the first parliament of the United Kingdom was held in 1801; parliaments between 1707 and 1800 were either parliaments of Great Britain or of Ireland). For acts passed up until 1707, see the list of acts of the Parliament of England and the list of acts of the Parliament of Scotland. For acts passed from 1707 to 1800, see the list of acts of the Parliament of Great Britain. See also the list of acts of the Parliament of Ireland.

For acts of the devolved parliaments and assemblies in the United Kingdom, see the list of acts of the Scottish Parliament, the list of acts of the Northern Ireland Assembly, and the list of acts and measures of Senedd Cymru; see also the list of acts of the Parliament of Northern Ireland.

The number shown after each act's title is its chapter number. Acts passed before 1963 are cited using this number, preceded by the year(s) of the reign during which the relevant parliamentary session was held; thus the Union with Ireland Act 1800 is cited as "39 & 40 Geo. 3 c. 67", meaning the 67th act passed during the session that started in the 39th year of the reign of George III and which finished in the 40th year of that reign. Note that the modern convention is to use Arabic numerals in citations (thus "41 Geo. 3" rather than "41 Geo. III"). Acts of the last session of the Parliament of Great Britain and the first session of the Parliament of the United Kingdom are both cited as "41 Geo. 3".

Some of these acts have a short title. Some of these acts have never had a short title. Some of these acts have a short title given to them by later acts, such as by the Short Titles Act 1896.

== 12 & 13 Vict. ==
The second session of the 15th Parliament of the United Kingdom, which met from 1 February 1849 until 1 August 1849.

=== Public general acts ===
Short title	Citation	Royal assent
Long title
Inland Revenue Board Act 1849 (repealed)	12 & 13 Vict. c. 1	27 February 1849
An Act to consolidate the Boards of Excise and Stamps and Taxes into One Board of Commissioners of Inland Revenue, and to make provision for the Collection of such Revenue. (Repealed by Customs and Excise Act 1952 (15 & 16 Geo. 6 & 1 Eliz. 2. c. 44))
Habeas Corpus Suspension (Ireland) Act 1849 (repealed)	12 & 13 Vict. c. 2	27 February 1849
An Act to continue, until the First Day of September One thousand eight hundred and forty-nine, an Act of the last Session, (Note: Habeas Corpus Suspension (Ireland) Act 1848 (11 & 12 Vict. c. 35)) for empowering the Lord Lieutenant or other Chief Governor or Governors of Ireland to apprehend and detain such Persons as he or they shall suspect of conspiring against Her Majesty's Person and Government. (Repealed by Statute Law Revision Act 1875 (38 & 39 Vict. c. 66))
Supply Act 1849 (repealed)	12 & 13 Vict. c. 3	9 March 1849
An Act to apply the Sum of Eight Millions out of the Consolidated Fund to the Service of the Year One thousand eight hundred and forty-nine. (Repealed by Statute Law Revision Act 1875 (38 & 39 Vict. c. 66))
Guardians (Ireland) Act 1849 (repealed)	12 & 13 Vict. c. 4	9 March 1849
An Act to amend the Laws relating to the Appointment of Vice Guardians of Unions in Ireland. (Repealed by Children and Young Persons Act (Northern Ireland) 1950 (c. 5 (N.I.)))
Relief of Distress (Ireland) Act 1849 (repealed)	12 & 13 Vict. c. 5	9 March 1849
An Act to authorize an Advance of Money for the Relief of certain distressed Poor Law Unions in Ireland. (Repealed by Statute Law Revision Act 1875 (38 & 39 Vict. c. 66))
Buckinghamshire Assizes Act 1849 (repealed)	12 & 13 Vict. c. 6	9 March 1849
An Act to repeal an Act of the Twenty first Year of George the Second, (Note: Buckinghamshire Assizes Act 1747 (21 Geo. 2. c. 12)) for holding the Summer Assizes at Buckingham; and to authorize the Appointment of a more convenient Place for holding the same. (Repealed by Statute Law Revision Act 1891 (54 & 55 Vict. c. 67))
Inclosures Act 1849	12 & 13 Vict. c. 7	9 March 1849
An Act to authorize the Inclosure of certain Lands in pursuance of the Fourth Annual General Report of the Inclosure Commissioners for England and Wales.
Poor Law (Overseers) Act 1849 (repealed)	12 & 13 Vict. c. 8	22 March 1849
An Act to remove Doubts as to the Appointment of Overseers in Cities and Boroughs. (Repealed for England and Wales by Rating and Valuation Act 1925 (15 & 16 Geo. 5. c. 90) and for Scotland and Northern Ireland by Statute Law Revision Act 1958 (6 & 7 Eliz. 2. c. 46))
Indemnity Act 1849 (repealed)	12 & 13 Vict. c. 9	3 April 1849
An Act to indemnify such Persons in the United Kingdom as have omitted to qualify themselves for Offices and Employments, and to extend the Time limited for those Purposes respectively until the Twenty-fifth Day of March One thousand eight hundred and fifty. (Repealed by Promissory Oaths Act 1871 (34 & 35 Vict. c. 48))
Mutiny Act 1849 (repealed)	12 & 13 Vict. c. 10	3 April 1849
An Act for punishing Mutiny and Desertion, and for the better Payment of the Army and their Quarters. (Repealed by Statute Law Revision Act 1875 (38 & 39 Vict. c. 66))
Larceny Act 1849 (repealed)	12 & 13 Vict. c. 11	3 April 1849
An Act to amend the Laws in England and Ireland relative to Larceny and other Offences connected therewith. (Repealed by Criminal Statutes Repeal Act 1861 (24 & 25 Vict. c. 95))
Marine Mutiny Act 1849 (repealed)	12 & 13 Vict. c. 12	3 April 1849
An Act for the Regulation of Her Majesty's Royal Marine Forces while on Shore. (Repealed by Statute Law Revision Act 1875 (38 & 39 Vict. c. 66))
Poor Relief Act 1849 (repealed)	12 & 13 Vict. c. 13	11 May 1849
An Act to provide a more effectual Regulation and Control over the Maintenance of poor Persons in Houses not being the Workhouses of any Union or Parish. (Repealed by Poor Law Act 1927 (17 & 18 Geo. 5. c. 14))
Distress for Rates Act 1849 (repealed)	12 & 13 Vict. c. 14	11 May 1849
An Act to enable Overseers of the Poor and Surveyors of the Highways to recover the Costs of distraining for Rates. (Repealed by Distress for Rates Act 1960 (8 & 9 Eliz. 2. c. 12))
Recovery of Wages (Ireland) Act 1849 (repealed)	12 & 13 Vict. c. 15	11 May 1849
An Act to amend an Act of the Fifty-fourth Year of King George the Third, (Note: Recovery of Wages (Ireland) Act 1814 (54 Geo. 3. c. 116)) for the Recovery of small Sums due for Wages in Ireland. (Repealed by Summary Jurisdiction (Ireland) Act 1850 (13 & 14 Vict. c. 102))
Justices Protection (Ireland) Act 1849	12 & 13 Vict. c. 16	11 May 1849
An Act to protect Justices of the Peace in Ireland from vexatious Actions for Acts done by them in the Execution of their Office.
Spirits (Ireland) Act 1849 (repealed)	12 & 13 Vict. c. 17	11 May 1849
An Act to continue for Five Years so much of an Act of the Second and Third Years of Her present Majesty, (Note: Sale of Spirits, etc. (Ireland) Act 1839 (2 & 3 Vict. c. 79)) as enables Justices to grant Warrants for entering Places in which Spirits are sold without Licence in Ireland. (Repealed by Statute Law Revision Act 1875 (38 & 39 Vict. c. 66))
Petty Sessions Act 1849 (repealed)	12 & 13 Vict. c. 18	11 May 1849
An Act for the holding of Petty Sessions of the Peace in Boroughs, and for providing Places for the holding of such Petty Sessions in Counties and Boroughs. (Repealed by Justices of the Peace Act 1949 (12, 13 & 14 Geo. 6. c. 101) and Local Government Act 1972 (c. 70))
Prisoners Removal (Ireland) Act 1849 (repealed)	12 & 13 Vict. c. 19	11 May 1849
An Act to make perpetual an Act of the Tenth and Eleventh Years of Her present Majesty, (Note: Prisoners Removal (Ireland) Act 1847 (10 & 11 Vict. c. 45)) for authorizing the Removal of Prisoners from the several Gaols in Ireland in Cases of Epidemic Diseases. (Repealed by Statute Law Revision Act 1861 (24 & 25 Vict. c. 101))
Exchequer Bills Act 1849 (repealed)	12 & 13 Vict. c. 20	11 May 1849
An Act for raising the Sum of Seventeen millions seven hundred and eighty-six thousand seven hundred Pounds by Exchequer Bills, for the Service of the Year One thousand eight hundred and forty-nine. (Repealed by Statute Law Revision Act 1875 (38 & 39 Vict. c. 66))
Newfoundland Act 1849 (repealed)	12 & 13 Vict. c. 21	24 May 1849
An Act to confirm certain Acts of the Legislature of Newfoundland respecting the rebuilding of the Town of Saint John's Newfoundland, and to enable the said Legislature to make other Provisions respecting the rebuilding of the said Town. (Repealed by Statute Law Revision Act 1894 (57 & 58 Vict. c. 56))
Land Grants, New South Wales Act 1849	12 & 13 Vict. c. 22	24 May 1849
An Act to remove Doubts concerning the Validity of certain Grants of Land in the Colony of New South Wales.
Improvement of Land (Ireland) Act 1849 (repealed)	12 & 13 Vict. c. 23	24 May 1849
An Act to authorize further Advances of Money for the Improvement of Landed Property, and the Extension and Promotion of Drainage and other Works of public Utility, in Ireland. (Repealed by Statute Law Revision Act 1875 (38 & 39 Vict. c. 66))
Rate in Aid of Distressed Unions Act 1849 (repealed)	12 & 13 Vict. c. 24	24 May 1849
An Act to make Provision, until the Thirty-first Day of December One thousand eight hundred and fifty, for a General Rate in Aid of certain distressed Unions and Electoral Divisions in Ireland. (Repealed by Statute Law Revision Act 1875 (38 & 39 Vict. c. 66))
Portuguese Deserters Act 1849 (repealed)	12 & 13 Vict. c. 25	26 June 1849
An Act for giving effect to the Stipulations of a Treaty between Her Majesty and the Queen of Portugal for the Apprehension of certain Deserters. (Repealed by Statute Law Revision (Substituted Enactments) Act 1876 (39 & 40 Vict. c. 20), Statute Law Revision Act 1891 (54 & 55 Vict. c. 67) and Statute Law Revision Act 1950 (14 Geo. 6. c. 6))
Leases Act 1849 (repealed)	12 & 13 Vict. c. 26	26 June 1849
An Act for granting Relief against Defects in Leases made under Powers of Leasing in certain Cases. (Repealed for England and Wales by Law of Property Act 1925 (15 & 16 Geo. 5. c. 20))
Transportation (Ireland) Act 1849 (repealed)	12 & 13 Vict. c. 27	26 June 1849
An Act to remove Doubts concerning the Transportation of Offenders under Judgment of Death to whom Mercy may be extended in Ireland. (Repealed by Criminal Justice (Miscellaneous Provisions) Act (Northern Ireland) 1968 (c. 28 (N.I.)))
Greenwich Markets Act 1849	12 & 13 Vict. c. 28	26 June 1849
An Act to enable the Commissioners of Greenwich Hospital to regulate and manage the Markets held at Greenwich in the County of Kent.
Navigation Act 1849 (repealed)	12 & 13 Vict. c. 29	26 June 1849
An Act to amend the Laws in force for the Encouragement of British Shipping and Navigation. (Repealed by Merchant Shipping Repeal Act 1854 (17 & 18 Vict. c. 120))
Sheep Stealers (Ireland) Act 1849 (repealed)	12 & 13 Vict. c. 30	26 June 1849
An Act for the better Preservation of Sheep, and more speedy Detection of Receivers of stolen Sheep, in Ireland. (Repealed by Summary Jurisdiction (Ireland) Act 1850 (13 & 14 Vict. c. 102))
Turnpike Roads (Scotland) Act 1849 (repealed)	12 & 13 Vict. c. 31	26 June 1849
An Act for requiring the Transmission of the annual Abstracts and Statements of Trustees of Turnpike Roads and Bridges in Scotland to the Secretary of State to be laid before Parliament. (Repealed by Statute Law Revision Act 1891 (54 & 55 Vict. c. 67))
Grand Jury Cess (Ireland) Act 1849 (repealed)	12 & 13 Vict. c. 32	26 June 1849
An Act to continue to the End of the Year One thousand eight hundred and fifty-one certain temporary Provisions relating to the Collection of Grand Jury Cess in Ireland. (Repealed by Statute Law Revision Act 1875 (38 & 39 Vict. c. 66))
Passengers Act 1849 (repealed)	12 & 13 Vict. c. 33	13 July 1849
An Act for regulating the Carriage of Passengers in Merchant Vessels. (Repealed by Passengers Act 1852 (15 & 16 Vict. c. 44))
Justices of the Peace Small Debt (Scotland) Act 1849 or the Justices of the Peace Small Debts (Scotland) Act 1849 (repealed)	12 & 13 Vict. c. 34	13 July 1849
An Act to amend an Act (Note: Justices of the Peace Small Debt (Scotland) Act 1825 (6 Geo. 4. c. 48)) regulating the Justice of the Peace Small Debt Courts in Scotland. (Repealed by District Courts (Scotland) Act 1975 (c. 20))
Highways Returns Act 1849 (repealed)	12 & 13 Vict. c. 35	13 July 1849
An Act for requiring annual Returns of the Expenditure on Highways in England and Wales to be transmitted to the Secretary of State, and afterwards laid before Parliament. (Repealed by Highway Accounts Returns Act 1879 (42 & 43 Vict. c. 39))
County Cess (Ireland) Act 1849 (repealed)	12 & 13 Vict. c. 36	13 July 1849
An Act to make Provision, during the present Year, and to the End of the Year One thousand eight hundred and fifty-one, relating to the Collection of County Cess in Ireland, and to the Remuneration of the Collectors thereof. (Repealed by Statute Law Revision Act 1875 (38 & 39 Vict. c. 66))
Loan Societies Act 1849 (repealed)	12 & 13 Vict. c. 37	13 July 1849
An Act to continue to the First Day of October One thousand eight hundred and fifty, and to the End of the then next Session of Parliament, an Act (Note: Loan Societies Act 1840 (3 & 4 Vict. c. 110)) to amend the Laws relating to Loan Societies. (Repealed by Statute Law Revision Act 1875 (38 & 39 Vict. c. 66))
Assaults (Ireland) Act 1849 (repealed)	12 & 13 Vict. c. 38	13 July 1849
An Act to continue for Five Years an Act of the Second and Third Years of Her present Majesty, (Note: Assaults (Ireland) Act 1839 (2 & 3 Vict. c. 77)) for the better Prevention and Punishment of Assaults in Ireland. (Repealed by Statute Law Revision Act 1875 (38 & 39 Vict. c. 66))
Ecclesiastical Jurisdiction Act 1849 (repealed)	12 & 13 Vict. c. 39	13 July 1849
An Act for further continuing, until the First Day of August One thousand eight hundred and fifty, and to the End of the then next Session of Parliament, certain temporary Provisions concerning Ecclesiastical Jurisdiction in England. (Repealed by Statute Law Revision Act 1875 (38 & 39 Vict. c. 66))
Soap Duties Allowances Act 1849 (repealed)	12 & 13 Vict. c. 40	13 July 1849
An Act to continue, until the Thirty-first Day of July One thousand eight hundred and fifty, and to the End of the then next Session of Parliament, certain of the Allowances of the Duty of Excise on Soap used in Manufactures. (Repealed by Statute Law Revision Act 1875 (38 & 39 Vict. c. 66))
Coin Act 1849 (repealed)	12 & 13 Vict. c. 41	13 July 1849
An Act to extend an Act of the Fifty-sixth Year of King George the Third, (Note: Coin Act 1816 (56 Geo. 3. c. 68)) for providing for a new Silver Coinage, and for regulating the Currency of the Gold and Silver Coin of this Realm. (Repealed by Coinage Act 1870 (33 & 34 Vict. c. 10))
Sheriff of Westmorland Act 1849 (repealed)	12 & 13 Vict. c. 42	13 July 1849
An Act to provide for the Execution for One Year of the Office of Sheriff in the County of Westmoreland. (Repealed by Statute Law Revision Act 1875 (38 & 39 Vict. c. 66))
Mutiny, etc., East Indies Act 1849 (repealed)	12 & 13 Vict. c. 43	28 July 1849
An Act for punishing Mutiny and Desertion of Officers and Soldiers in the Service of the East India Company, and for regulating in such Service the Payment of Regimental Debts and the Distribution of the Effects of Officers and Soldiers dying in the Service. (Repealed by Mutiny, etc., East Indies Act 1857 (20 & 21 Vict. c. 66))
Supply (No. 2) Act 1849 (repealed)	12 & 13 Vict. c. 44	28 July 1849
An Act to apply the Sum of Three Millions out of the Consolidated Fund to the Service of the Year One thousand eight hundred and forty-nine. (Repealed by Statute Law Revision Act 1875 (38 & 39 Vict. c. 66))
Quarter Sessions Act 1849 (repealed)	12 & 13 Vict. c. 45	28 July 1849
An Act to amend the Procedure in Courts of General and Quarter Sessions of the Peace in England and Wales, and for the better Advancement of Justice in Cases within the Jurisdiction of those Courts. (Repealed by Courts Act 1971 (c. 23))
Union of Turnpike Trusts Act 1849 (repealed)	12 & 13 Vict. c. 46	28 July 1849
An Act to facilitate the Union of Turnpike Trusts. (Repealed by Statute Law Revision Act 1894 (57 & 58 Vict. c. 56))
Turnpike Acts (Ireland) Act 1849 (repealed)	12 & 13 Vict. c. 47	28 July 1849
An Act to continue certain Acts for regulating Turnpike Roads in Ireland. (Repealed by Statute Law Revision Act 1875 (38 & 39 Vict. c. 66))
Vancouver's Island Act 1849	12 & 13 Vict. c. 48	28 July 1849
An Act to provide for the Administration of Justice in Vancouver's Island.
School Sites Act 1849	12 & 13 Vict. c. 49	28 July 1849
An Act to extend and explain the Provisions of the Acts for the granting of Sites for Schools.
Sewers Act 1849 (repealed)	12 & 13 Vict. c. 50	28 July 1849
An Act for further amending the Laws relating to Sewers. (Repealed by Land Drainage Act 1930 (20 & 21 Geo. 5. c. 44))
Judicial Factors Act 1849	12 & 13 Vict. c. 51	28 July 1849
An Act for the better Protection of the Property of Pupils, absent Persons, and Persons under Mental Incapacity in Scotland.
Militia Ballots Suspension Act 1849 (repealed)	12 & 13 Vict. c. 52	28 July 1849
An Act to suspend, until the First Day of October One thousand eight hundred and fifty, the making of Lists and the Ballots and Enrolments for the Militia of the United Kingdom. (Repealed by Statute Law Revision Act 1875 (38 & 39 Vict. c. 66))
Solicitors (Ireland) Act 1849	12 & 13 Vict. c. 53	28 July 1849
An Act for consolidating and amending several of the Laws relating to Attornies and Solicitors in Ireland.
Highway Rates Act 1849 (repealed)	12 & 13 Vict. c. 54	28 July 1849
An Act to continue until the First Day of October One thousand eight hundred and fifty, and to the End of the then next Session of Parliament, an Act (Note: Application of Highway Rates to Turnpikes Act 1841 (4 & 5 Vict. c. 59)) for authorizing the Application of Highway Rates to Turnpike Roads. (Repealed by Statute Law Revision Act 1875 (38 & 39 Vict. c. 66))
Newgate Gaol, Dublin, etc. Act 1849 (repealed)	12 & 13 Vict. c. 55	28 July 1849
An Act to abolish the Gaol of Newgate in the County of the City of Dublin, and provide Compensation for the Officers thereof, and to enable the Grand Jury of the County of the said City to increase the Salaries of the Chaplains of certain other Gaols thereof, and to re-assess on the County of the said City certain Arrears of Grand Jury Cess. (Repealed by Statute Law Revision Act 1894 (57 & 58 Vict. c. 56))
Lunatic Asylums (Ireland) Act 1849 (repealed)	12 & 13 Vict. c. 56	28 July 1849
An Act to continue, until the Thirty-first Day of July One thousand eight hundred land fifty, and to the End of the then next Session of Parliament, an Act of the Fifth and Sixth Years of Her present Majesty (Note: Private Lunatic Asylums (Ireland) Act 1842 (5 & 6 Vict. c. 123)) for amending the Law relative to Private Lunatic Asylums in Ireland. (Repealed by Statute Law Revision Act 1875 (38 & 39 Vict. c. 66))
Inclosure Act (No. 1) 1849	12 & 13 Vict. c. 57	28 July 1849
An Act to authorize the Inclosure of certain Lands in pursuance of a Special Report of the Inclosure Commissioners for England and Wales.
Inland Revenue Officers Act 1849 (repealed)	12 & 13 Vict. c. 58	28 July 1849
An Act to extend to the Officers of Inland Revenue the Privilege of becoming Members of the Excise Benevolent Fund Society. (Repealed by Statute Law (Repeals) Act 1975 (c. 10))
Landed Property Improvement (Ireland) Act 1849	12 & 13 Vict. c. 59	28 July 1849
An Act to amend an Act of the Tenth Year of Her Majesty, (Note: Landed Property Improvement (Ireland) Act 1847 (10 & 11 Vict. c. 32)) for facilitating the Improvement of Landed Property in Ireland.
Poor (Ireland) Act 1849 (repealed)	12 & 13 Vict. c. 60	28 July 1849
An Act further to amend an Act of the Tenth Year of Her present Majesty, (Note: Poor Relief (Ireland) (No. 1) Act 1847 (10 & 11 Vict. c. 10)) for rendering valid certain Proceedings for the Relief of Distress in Ireland, by Employment of the Labouring Poor, and to indemnify those who have acted in such Proceedings. (Repealed by Statute Law Revision Act 1875 (38 & 39 Vict. c. 66))
Poor Rates Act 1849 (repealed)	12 & 13 Vict. c. 61	28 July 1849
An Act to continue until the First Day of October One thousand eight hundred and fifty, and to the End of the then next Session of Parliament, the Exemption of Inhabitants from Liability to be rated as such in respect of Stock in Trade or other Property to the Relief of the Poor. (Repealed by Statute Law Revision Act 1875 (38 & 39 Vict. c. 66))
Midland Great Western Railway Act 1849 or the Advance of Money (Athlone to Galway Railway) Act 1849 (repealed)	12 & 13 Vict. c. 62	28 July 1849
An Act to authorize the Advance of Money out of the Consolidated Fund to the Midland Great Western Railway of Ireland Company. (Repealed by Statute Law (Repeals) Act 2013 (c. 2))
Relief of Distress (Ireland) (No. 2) Act 1849 (repealed)	12 & 13 Vict. c. 63	28 July 1849
An Act to authorize a further Advance of Money for the Relief of certain distressed Poor Law Unions in Ireland. (Repealed by Statute Law Revision Act 1875 (38 & 39 Vict. c. 66))
Poor Law (Justices Jurisdiction) Act 1849 (repealed)	12 & 13 Vict. c. 64	28 July 1849
An Act to remove Doubts as to the Authority of Justices of the Peace to act in certain Matters relating to the Poor in Cities and Boroughs. (Repealed by Distress for Rates Act 1960 (8 & 9 Eliz. 2. c. 12))
County Rates within Boroughs Act 1849 (repealed)	12 & 13 Vict. c. 65	28 July 1849
An Act to provide a more convenient Mode of levying and collecting County Rates, County Police Rates, and District Police Rates in Parishes situated partly within and partly without the Limits of Boroughs which are not liable to such Rates. (Repealed by Municipal Corporations Act 1882 (45 & 46 Vict. c. 50))
Colonial Inland Post Office Act 1849 (repealed)	12 & 13 Vict. c. 66	28 July 1849
An Act for enabling Colonial Legislatures to establish Inland Posts. (Repealed by Post Office Act 1908 (8 Edw. 7. c. 48))
Sequestration Act 1849	12 & 13 Vict. c. 67	28 July 1849
An Act to extend the Remedies of Sequestrators of Ecclesiastical Benefices.
Consular Marriages Act 1849 (repealed)	12 & 13 Vict. c. 68	28 July 1849
An Act for facilitating the Marriage of British Subjects resident in Foreign Countries. (Repealed by Foreign Marriage Act 1892 (55 & 56 Vict. c. 23))
Indictable Offences (Ireland) Act 1849 (repealed)	12 & 13 Vict. c. 69	28 July 1849
An Act to facilitate the Performance of the Duties of Justices of the Peace out of Quarter Sessions in Ireland with respect to Persons charged with Indictable Offences. (Repealed by Petty Sessions (Ireland) Act 1851 (14 & 15 Vict. c. 93))
Summary Convictions (Ireland) Act 1849 (repealed)	12 & 13 Vict. c. 70	28 July 1849
An Act to facilitate the Performance of the Duties of Justices of the Peace out of Quarter Sessions in Ireland with respect to Summary Convictions and Orders. (Repealed by Statute Law Revision Act 1861 (24 & 25 Vict. c. 101))
Regimental Benefit Societies Act 1849 (repealed)	12 & 13 Vict. c. 71	28 July 1849
An Act to dissolve Regimental Benefit Societies, and to provide for the Application of the Funds of such Societies, and of Regimental Charitable Funds. (Repealed by Military Savings Banks Act 1859 (22 & 23 Vict. c. 20))
House of Commons Offices Act 1849 (repealed)	12 & 13 Vict. c. 72	28 July 1849
An Act further to amend the Acts relating to the Offices of the House of Commons. (Repealed by House of Commons (Administration) Act 1978 (c. 36))
Army Enlistment Act 1849 (repealed)	12 & 13 Vict. c. 73	28 July 1849
An Act to limit the Enlistment in the Artillery and other Ordnance Corps. (Repealed by Army Enlistment Act 1867 (30 & 31 Vict. c. 34))
Trustees Relief Act 1849 (repealed)	12 & 13 Vict. c. 74	28 July 1849
An Act for the further Relief of Trustees. (Repealed by Trustee Act 1893 (56 & 57 Vict. c. 53))
Militia Pay Act 1849 (repealed)	12 & 13 Vict. c. 75	28 July 1849
An Act to defray until the First Day of August One thousand eight hundred and fifty the Charge of the Pay, Clothing, and contingent and other Expenses of the Disembodied Militia in Great Britain and Ireland; to grant Allowances in certain Cases to Subaltern Officers, Adjutants, Paymasters, Quartermasters, Surgeons, Assistant Surgeons, Surgeons Mates, and Serjeant Majors of the Militia; and to authorize the Employment of the Non-commissioned Officers. (Repealed by Statute Law Revision Act 1875 (38 & 39 Vict. c. 66))
Offences Against Women Act 1849 (repealed)	12 & 13 Vict. c. 76	28 July 1849
An Act to protect Women from fraudulent Practices for procuring their Defilement. (Repealed by Criminal Statutes Repeal Act 1861 (24 & 25 Vict. c. 95))
Incumbered Estates (Ireland) Act 1849 (repealed)	12 & 13 Vict. c. 77	28 July 1849
An Act further to facilitate the Sale and Transfer of Incumbered Estates in Ireland. (Repealed by Statute Law Revision Act 1875 (38 & 39 Vict. c. 66))
House of Lords Costs Taxation Act 1849 (repealed)	12 & 13 Vict. c. 78	28 July 1849
An Act for the more effectual Taxation of Costs on Private Bills in the House of Lords, and to facilitate the Taxation of other Costs on Private Bills in certain Cases. (Repealed by Parliamentary Costs Act 2006 (c. 37))
New Zealand Company Act 1849 (repealed)	12 & 13 Vict. c. 79	1 August 1849
An Act to facilitate the Execution of Conveyances and other Instruments by or on behalf of the New Zealand Company in New Zealand. (Repealed by Statute Law Revision Act 1894 (57 & 58 Vict. c. 56))
Stamps Act 1849 (repealed)	12 & 13 Vict. c. 80	1 August 1849
An Act to repeal the Allowances on the Purchase of Stamps and for the receiving and accounting for the Duties on Gold and Silver Plate, and to grant other Allowances in lieu thereof. (Repealed by Customs and Inland Revenue Act 1890 (53 & 54 Vict. c. 8))
New Forest and Waltham Forest Act 1849 (repealed)	12 & 13 Vict. c. 81	1 August 1849
An Act to authorise Her Majesty to issue a Commission to inquire into and report upon Rights or Claims over the New Forest in the County of Southampton and Waltham Forest in the County of Essex. (Repealed by Wild Creatures and Forest Laws Act 1971 (c. 47))
Boroughs, Relief from County Expenditure Act 1849 (repealed)	12 & 13 Vict. c. 82	1 August 1849
An Act to relieve Boroughs, in certain Cases, from Contribution to certain Descriptions of County Expenditure. (Repealed by Statute Law Revision Act 1891 (54 & 55 Vict. c. 67))
Inclosure Act 1849	12 & 13 Vict. c. 83	1 August 1849
An Act further to facilitate the Inclosure of Commons, and the Improvement of Commons and other Lands.
Slave Trade Act 1849 (repealed)	12 & 13 Vict. c. 84	1 August 1849
An Act for carrying into effect Engagements between Her Majesty and certain Arabian Chiefs in the Persian Gulf for the more effectual Suppression of the Slave Trade. (Repealed by Slave Trade Act 1873 (36 & 37 Vict. c. 88))
Dublin Corporation Act 1849 (repealed)	12 & 13 Vict. c. 85	1 August 1849
An Act to amend an Act (Note: Municipal Corporations Act (Ireland) 1840 (3 & 4 Vict. c. 108)) for the Regulation of Municipal Corporations in Ireland, so far as relates to the Borough of Dublin. (Repealed by Statute Law (Repeals) Act 1993 (c. 50))
Workhouses (Ireland) Act 1849 (repealed)	12 & 13 Vict. c. 86	1 August 1849
An Act to provide additional Funds for Loans by the Public Works Loan Commissioners for building Workhouses in Ireland. (Repealed by Public Works Loans Act 1875 (38 & 39 Vict. c. 89))
Turnpike Acts Continuance Act 1849 (repealed)	12 & 13 Vict. c. 87	1 August 1849
An Act to continue certain Turnpike Acts in Great Britain for limited Periods, and to make certain Provisions respecting Turnpike Roads in England. (Repealed by Statute Law (Repeals) Act 1981 (c. 19))
Pilotage Act 1849 (repealed)	12 & 13 Vict. c. 88	1 August 1849
An Act to amend the Laws relating to Pilotage. (Repealed by Merchant Shipping Repeal Act 1854 (17 & 18 Vict. c. 120))
Treasury Instruments (Signature) Act 1849	12 & 13 Vict. c. 89	1 August 1849
An Act to reduce the Number of Signatures required to Instruments issued by the Lords of the Treasury.
Customs Act 1849 (repealed)	12 & 13 Vict. c. 90	1 August 1849
An Act to amend the Laws relating to the Customs. (Repealed by Customs and Excise Act 1952 (15 & 16 Geo. 6 & 1 Eliz. 2. c. 44))
Dublin, Collection of Rates Act 1849	12 & 13 Vict. c. 91	1 August 1849
An Act to provide for the Collection of Rates in the City of Dublin.
Cruelty to Animals Act 1849 (repealed)	12 & 13 Vict. c. 92	1 August 1849
An Act for the more effectual Prevention of Cruelty to Animals. (Repealed by Protection of Animals Act 1911 (1 & 2 Geo. 5. c. 27))
Metropolitan Sewers Act 1849 (repealed)	12 & 13 Vict. c. 93	1 August 1849
An Act to amend the Metropolitan Sewers Act. (Note: Metropolitan Commissioners of Sewers Act 1848 (11 & 12 Vict. c. 112)) (Repealed by Statute Law Revision Act 1861 (24 & 25 Vict. c. 101))
Public Health Supplemental Act 1849	12 & 13 Vict. c. 94	1 August 1849
An Act for confirming certain Provisional Orders of the General Board of Health, and for other Matters relative to the Public Health and the Improvement of Towns and populous Places.
	Taunton.	
	Worcester.	
	Ware.	
	Sheerness.	
	Kendal.	
	Durham.	
	Leicester.	
	Chatham.	
	New Windsor.	
	Carmarthen.	
	Gloucester.	
	Lancaster.	
	Croydon.	
	Uxbridge.	
	Coventry.	
Judgments (Ireland) Act 1849 (repealed)	12 & 13 Vict. c. 95	1 August 1849
An Act to amend the Law concerning Judgments in Ireland. (Repealed by Judgments (Enforcement) Act (Northern Ireland) 1969 (c. 30 (N.I.)))
Admiralty Offences (Colonial) Act 1849	12 & 13 Vict. c. 96	1 August 1849
An Act to provide for the Prosecution and Trial in Her Majesty’s Colonies of Offences committed within the Jurisdiction of the Admiralty.
Dublin Improvement Act 1849	12 & 13 Vict. c. 97	1 August 1849
An Act for the Improvement of the City of Dublin.
Appropriation Act 1849 (repealed)	12 & 13 Vict. c. 98	1 August 1849
An Act to apply a Sum out of the Consolidated Fund, and certain other Sums, to the Service of the Year One thousand eight hundred and forty-nine; and to appropriate the Supplies granted in this Session of Parliament. (Repealed by Statute Law Revision Act 1875 (38 & 39 Vict. c. 66))
Chapels of Ease, etc. (Ireland) Act 1849 (repealed)	12 & 13 Vict. c. 99	1 August 1849
An Act to encourage Endowment of Chapels of Ease, and facilitate Assignment of Pastoral Districts thereto; and to amend an Act of the Eighth Year of Her present Majesty (Note: Marriages (Ireland) Act 1844 (7 & 8 Vict. c. 81)) for Marriages in Ireland, and for registering such Marriages. (Repealed by Statute Law Revision Act 1891 (54 & 55 Vict. c. 67))
Drainage of Lands Act 1849 (repealed)	12 & 13 Vict. c. 100	1 August 1849
An Act to promote the Advance of private Money for Drainage of Lands in Great Britain and Ireland. (Repealed by Improvement of Land Act 1864 (27 & 28 Vict. c. 114))
County Courts Act 1849 (repealed)	12 & 13 Vict. c. 101	1 August 1849
An Act to amend the Act for the more easy Recovery of Small Debts and Demands in England, and to abolish certain Inferior Courts of Record. (Repealed by County Courts Act 1888 (51 & 52 Vict. c. 43))
Royal Pavilion, Brighton, etc. Act 1849 (repealed)	12 & 13 Vict. c. 102	1 August 1849
An Act to authorize the Sale of the Royal Pavilion at Brighton, and the Grounds thereof; and to apply the Money arising from such Sale. (Repealed by Statute Law Revision Act 1894 (57 & 58 Vict. c. 56))
Poor Law Amendment Act 1849 (repealed)	12 & 13 Vict. c. 103	1 August 1849
An Act to continue an Act of the last Session of Parliament, (Note: Poor Law Amendment Act 1848 (11 & 12 Vict. c. 110)) for charging the Maintenance of certain poor Persons in Unions upon the Common Fund; and to make certain Amendments in the Laws for the Relief of the Poor. (Repealed by National Assistance Act 1948 (11 & 12 Geo. 6. c. 29))
Poor Relief (Ireland) Act 1849 (repealed)	12 & 13 Vict. c. 104	1 August 1849
An Act to amend the acts for the more effectual Relief of the destitute Poor in Ireland. (Repealed by Statute Law Revision (Northern Ireland) Act 1980 (c. 59))
Renewable Leasehold Conversion Act 1849 or the Renewable Leasehold Conversion (Ireland) Act 1849	12 & 13 Vict. c. 105	1 August 1849
An Act for converting the renewable Leasehold Tenure of Lands in Ireland into a Tenure in Fee.
Bankrupt Law Consolidation Act 1849 (repealed)	12 & 13 Vict. c. 106	1 August 1849
An Act to amend and consolidate the Laws relating to Bankrupts. (Repealed by Bankruptcy Repeal and Insolvent Court Act 1869 (32 & 33 Vict. c. 83))
Bankruptcy (Ireland) Act 1849 (repealed)	12 & 13 Vict. c. 107	1 August 1849
An Act for the Amendment of the Law of Bankruptcy in Ireland. (Repealed by Irish Bankrupt and Insolvent Act 1857 (20 & 21 Vict. c. 60))
Joint Stock Companies Act 1849 (repealed)	12 & 13 Vict. c. 108	1 August 1849
An Act to amend the Joint Stock Companies Winding-up Act, 1848. (Note: Joint Stock Companies Act 1848 (11 & 12 Vict. c. 45)) (Repealed by Companies Act 1862 (25 & 26 Vict. c. 89))
Petty Bag Act 1849 (repealed)	12 & 13 Vict. c. 109	1 August 1849
An Act to amend an Act (Note: Court of Chancery Offices Act 1848 (11 & 12 Vict. c. 94)) to regulate certain Offices in the Petty Bag in the High Court of Chancery, the Practice of the Common-Law Side of that Court, and the Enrolment Office of the said Court. (Repealed by Courts Act 1971 (c. 23))
Lease Act 1849 or Leases Act 1849 or Leases (No. 2) Act 1849 (repealed)	12 & 13 Vict. c. 110	1 August 1849
An Act for suspending, until the First Day of June One thousand eight hundred and fifty, the Operation of an Act passed this Session, intituled "An Act for granting Relief against Defects in Leases made under Powers of Leasing in certain Cases." (Note: Leases Act 1849 (12 & 13 Vict. c. 26)) (Repealed for England and Wales by Law of Property Act 1925 (15 & 16 Geo. 5. c. 20) and for Northern Ireland by Statute Law Revision Act 1891 (54 & 55 Vict. c. 67) and Statute Law Revision Act (Northern Ireland) 1954 (c. 35 (N.I.)))
Nuisances Removal and Diseases Prevention Amendment Act 1849 (repealed)	12 & 13 Vict. c. 111	1 August 1849
An Act to amend the Nuisances Removal and Diseases Prevention Act, 1848. (Note: Nuisances Removal and Diseases Prevention Act 1848 (11 & 12 Vict. c. 123)) (Repealed for England by Nuisances Removal Act for England 1855 (18 & 19 Vict. c. 121) and for Wales, Scotland and Ireland by Sanitary Act 1866 (29 & 30 Vict. c. 90))

=== Local acts ===
Short title	Citation	Royal assent
Long title
Blackburn Waterworks Act 1849 (repealed)	12 & 13 Vict. c. i	11 May 1849
An Act to enable the Blackburn Waterworks Company to raise a further Sum of Money; and to amend the Act (Note: Blackburn Waterworks Act 1845 (8 & 9 Vict. c. cxxxviii)) relating thereto. (Repealed by Blackburn Waterworks Act 1861 (24 & 25 Vict. c. clv))
Sunderland Waterworks Amendment Act 1849 (repealed)	12 & 13 Vict. c. ii	11 May 1849
An Act for enabling the Sunderland Water Company to raise a further Sum of Money, and for amending and enlarging the Provisions of the Act (Note: Sunderland Waterworks Act 1846 (9 & 10 Vict. c. xxxvi)) relating to such Company. (Repealed by Sunderland and South Shields Waterworks Act 1852 (15 & 16 Vict. c. xxvii))
Brierley Hill Gas Act 1849 (repealed)	12 & 13 Vict. c. iii	11 May 1849
An Act for supplying the District of Brierley Hill in the Pariah of Kingswinford in the County of Stafford with Gas. (Repealed by Brierley Hill Gas Act 1865 (28 & 29 Vict. c. lv))
Roxburghshire and Berwickshire Roads Act 1849	12 & 13 Vict. c. iv	11 May 1849
An Act for more effectually repairing and maintaining certain Roads in the Counties of Roxburgh and Berwick.
Warrington Waterworks Act 1849 (repealed)	12 & 13 Vict. c. v	11 May 1849
An Act to authorize the Warrington Waterworks Company to raise a further Sum of Money. (Repealed by Warrington Waterworks Act 1855 (18 & 19 Vict. c. xciii))
Longton Market Act 1849	12 & 13 Vict. c. vi	11 May 1849
An Act for better establishing and maintaining the Market Place and Markets at Longton, heretofore called Lane End, in the Parish of Stoke-upon-Trent in the County of Stafford.
Feltwell Second District Drainage Act 1849	12 & 13 Vict. c. vii	11 May 1849
An Act for improving the Drainage of Feltwell Second District in the County of Norfolk, and for amending the Acts relating to the same.
Darlington Gas and Waterworks Act 1849 (repealed)	12 & 13 Vict. c. viii	11 May 1849
An Act for lighting with Gas and supplying with Water the Town and Borough of Darlington and the Suburbs thereof in the County of Durham. (Repealed by Stockton and Middlesbrough Waterworks Act 1858 (21 & 22 Vict. c. cxxxiii))
Nottingham Gas Amendment Act 1849 (repealed)	12 & 13 Vict. c. ix	11 May 1849
An Act for enabling the Nottingham Gaslight and Coke Company to raise a further Sum of Money, and for amending some of the Provisions of the Act (Note: Nottingham Gas Act 1842 (5 & 6 Vict. c. xiii)) relating to such Company. (Repealed by Nottingham Gas Act 1853 (16 & 17 Vict. c. xi))
Epsom Rates Act 1849 (repealed)	12 & 13 Vict. c. x	11 May 1849
An Act for more effectually assessing and collecting the Poor Rate and all other Rates and Assessments in the Parish of Epsom in the County of Surrey, and for the better Management of the Business and Affairs of the said Parish; and for other Purposes relating thereto. (Repealed by Surrey Act 1985 (c. iii))
Wareham Dock Act 1849	12 & 13 Vict. c. xi	11 May 1849
An Act for making and maintaining Docks near to Wareham in the County of Dorset, with an Entrance thereto from Wareham Channel.
Kidderminster Union Small Tenements Rating Act 1849 (repealed)	12 & 13 Vict. c. xii	24 May 1849
An Act for better assessing the Poor Rates on small Tenements in certain Parishes and Places within the Union of Kidderminster. (Repealed by Statute Law (Repeals) Act 1998 (c. 43))
Argyll Canal Company Dissolution Act 1849	12 & 13 Vict. c. xiii	24 May 1849
An Act for the Dissolution of the Argyll Canal Company, and for the Abandonment of their Undertaking.
New Ross Harbour (Wexford and Kilkenny Counties) Act 1849 (repealed)	12 & 13 Vict. c. xiv	24 May 1849
An Act to amend an Act (Note: New Ross Port and Harbour Act 1848 (11 & 12 Vict. c. cxxxix)) for the better regulating and improving the Port and Harbour of New Ross in the Counties of Wexford and Kilkenny. (Repealed by New Ross Port and Harbour Amendment Act 1861 (24 & 25 Vict. c. cxl))
Edinburgh and Northern Railway (Additional Capital) Act 1849	12 & 13 Vict. c. xv	24 May 1849
An Act to enable the Edinburgh and Northern Railway Company to raise a further Sum of Money.
Grimsby Pastures Act 1849	12 & 13 Vict. c. xvi	24 May 1849
An Act for the Management and Disposal of the Freemen's Pastures in the Parish of Great Grimsby in the Parts of Lindsey in the County of Lincoln; and for other Purposes.
Whitehaven Waterworks Act 1849	12 & 13 Vict. c. xvii	24 May 1849
An Act for better supplying the Town, Port, and Harbour of Whitehaven and other Places with Water.
Marshland Smeeth and Marshland Fen (Drainage Rate and Road District) Act 1849	12 & 13 Vict. c. xviii	24 May 1849
An Act for altering the Mode of assessing the Drainage Rates authorized by the Act (Note: Marshland, Norfolk (Drainage) Act 1796 (36 Geo. 3. c. 100)) for draining and improving Marshland Smeeth and Marshland Fen in the Country of Marshland in the County of Norfolk, and to provide for the Repair of Roads within the Limits of the said Act.
North Western Railway (Extension of Lancaster Branch, &c.) Act 1849	12 & 13 Vict. c. xix	24 May 1849
An Act for enabling the North-western Railway Company to make an Extension of the Lancaster Branch of their Railway, and a new Road to Settle Station, and to abandon the William Lands Branch; and for other Purposes.
Bradford Waterworks Amendment Act 1849 (repealed)	12 & 13 Vict. c. xx	24 May 1849
An Act for authorizing the Bradford Waterworks Company to raise a further Sum of Money. (Repealed by Bradford Waterworks Act 1854 (17 & 18 Vict. c. cxxiv))
Bury St. Edmund's Gas Act 1849	12 & 13 Vict. c. xxi	26 June 1849
An Act for incorporating the Bury Saint Edmund's Gas Company, and for better supplying the Town and Borough of Bury Saint Edmunds in the County of Suffolk with Gas.
Scottish Amicable Life Assurance Society's Incorporation Act 1849	12 & 13 Vict. c. xxii	26 June 1849
An Act to incorporate the Scottish Amicable Life Assurance Society; to enable the said Society to sue and be sued, and to take and hold Property; and for other Purposes relating to the said Society.
Perth Harbour Act 1849 (repealed)	12 & 13 Vict. c. xxiii	26 June 1849
An Act to amend and equalize the Rates and Duties leviable at the Port and Harbour of Perth, to authorize the borrowing of an additional Sum of Money, and for other Purposes in relation thereto. (Repealed by Perth Burgh and Harbour (No. 2) Act 1856 (19 & 20 Vict. c. cxxxviii))
Huntingdonshire and Cambridgeshire Drainage Act 1849	12 & 13 Vict. c. xxiv	26 June 1849
An Act to amend an Act of the Twelfth Year of the Reign of King George the Third, (Note: Drainage (Cambridge, Isle of Ely) Act 1772 (12 Geo. 3. c. 26)) for embanking, draining, and preserving certain Fen Lands and Low Grounds in the Parish of Ramsey in the County of Huntingdon, and in the Parishes of Deddington, March, Benwick, Wimblington, and Chatteris, within the Isle of Ely and County of Cambridge, so far as relates to the Lower or Fifth District, and to annex other Lands thereto.
Hartlepool Gas and Waterworks Act 1849 (repealed)	12 & 13 Vict. c. xxv	26 June 1849
An Act for amending an Act passed in the Tenth Year of the Reign of Her present Majesty, (Note: Hartlepool Gas and Waterworks Act 1846 (9 & 10 Vict. c. cxv)) for lighting with Gas and supplying with Water the Town of Hartlepool and the Neighbourhood thereof in the County of Durham. (Repealed by Hartlepool Gas and Waterworks Act 1855 (18 & 19 Vict. c. xlix))
Macclesfield Borough Waterworks Act 1849	12 & 13 Vict. c. xxvi	26 June 1849
An Act for better supplying with Water the Borough of Macclesfield in the County of Chester, and for other Purposes connected with the said Borough.
Leeds and Thirsk Railway Act 1849	12 & 13 Vict. c. xxvii	26 June 1849
An Act for enabling the Leeds and Harsh Railway Company to raise a further Sum of Money for the Completion of their Railways, to guarantee Interest on certain Shares, and for other Purposes.
Reading, Guildford and Reigate Railway (Connection with London and South Western Railway) Act 1849	12 & 13 Vict. c. xxviii	26 June 1849
An Act for making a short Railway to connect the Line of the Reading, Guildford, and Reigate Railway with the Line of the London and South-western Railway; and for other purposes.
Stainforth and Keadby Canal Purchase Act 1849	12 & 13 Vict. c. xxix	26 June 1849
An Act to vest the Stainforth and Keadby Canal in the Company of Proprietors of the Navigation of the River Dun.
Kirkcaldy Harbour and Petty Customs Act 1849 (repealed)	12 & 13 Vict. c. xxx	26 June 1849
An Act for enlarging, improving, and maintaining the Harbour of Kirkcaldy in the County of Fife, for regulating the Petty Customs of the Burgh of Kirkcaldy, and for other Purposes relating to the said Harbour and Burgh. (Repealed by Kirkcaldy Corporation Order Confirmation Act 1939 (2 & 3 Geo. 6. c. vi))
Sunderland Dock Amendment Act 1849 (repealed)	12 & 13 Vict. c. xxxi	26 June 1849
An Act to amend "The Sunderland Dock Act, 1846," (Note: Sunderland Dock Act 1846 (9 & 10 Vict. c. xiii)) and for other Purposes. (Repealed by Sunderland Dock Act 1855 (18 & 19 Vict. c. cxxviii))
Whittlesey Improvement Act 1849	12 & 13 Vict. c. xxxii	26 June 1849
An Act for defining the Boundaries of the Parishes of Whittlesey Saint Mary and Whittlesey Saint Andrew in the Isle of Ely in the County of Cambridge for Ecclesiastical Purposes, for the Union of the said Parishes for other Purposes, and for better paving, lighting, watching, cleansing, and otherwise regulating and improving the Town of Whittlesey.
London and South Western Railway (Extension of Powers) Act 1849	12 & 13 Vict. c. xxxiii	26 June 1849
An Act for extending the Powers of the London and South-western Railway Company for purchasing Lands for and completing the Works of the Railways from Basingstoke to Salisbury and from Farnham to Alton; and for other Purposes.
South-western Windsor Extension Act 1849 or the South Western Railway Windsor Extension Act 1849	12 & 13 Vict. c. xxxiv	26 June 1849
An Act for enabling the Windsor, Staines, and South-western (Richmond to Windsor) Railway Company to make an Extension of their Railway to the Town of New Windsor; and for other Purposes.
Ashton-under-Lyne Improvement Act 1849	12 & 13 Vict. c. xxxv	26 June 1849
An Act for the further Improvement of the Borough of Ashton-under-Lyne.
Staffordshire Potteries Waterworks Extension Act 1849 (repealed)	12 & 13 Vict. c. xxxvi	26 June 1849
An Act to extend the Provisions and enlarge the Powers of the Staffordshire Potteries Waterworks Act, 1847. (Note: Staffordshire Potteries Waterworks Act 1847 (10 & 11 Vict. c. cciv)) (Repealed by Staffordshire Potteries Waterworks Consolidation and Extension Act 1853 (16 & 17 Vict. c. cxcviii))
London Gaslight Amendment Act 1849 (repealed)	12 & 13 Vict. c. xxxvii	26 June 1849
An Act for granting further Powers to the London Gaslight Company. (Repealed by London Gaslight Act 1852 (15 & 16 Vict. c. lxxxii))
Cockermouth and Workington Railway Act 1849	12 & 13 Vict. c. xxxviii	26 June 1849
An Act to enable the Cockermouth and Workington Railway Company to make a Branch Railway to Bridgefoot; and for amending the Act (Note: Cockermouth and Workington Railway Act 1845 (8 & 9 Vict. c. cxx)) relating to their Railway.
Edinburgh and Glasgow Railway and Edinburgh and Glasgow Union Canal Amalgamation Act 1849	12 & 13 Vict. c. xxxix	26 June 1849
An Act for vesting the Edinburgh and Glasgow Union Canal in the Edinburgh and Glasgow Railway Company.
Railway Passengers Assurance Company Act 1849 (repealed)	12 & 13 Vict. c. xl	26 June 1849
An Act to confer certain Powers on the Railway Passengers Assurance Company. (Repealed by Railway Passengers Assurance (Consolidation) Act 1892 (55 & 56 Vict. c. viii))
Chester and Holyhead Railway (Increase of Capital) Act 1849	12 & 13 Vict. c. xli	26 June 1849
An Act to enable the Chester and Holyhead Railway Company to raise a further Sum of Money; and for other Purposes.
Kingston-upon-Thames and Richmond Parishes Act 1849	12 & 13 Vict. c. xlii	26 June 1849
An Act for making the Parish of Richmond in the County of Surrey a District Vicarage, by dividing the Vicarage of Kingston-upon-Thames and Sheen otherwise Richmond into Two separate Vicarages, and for providing a Stipend and Residence for the Vicar of Richmond aforesaid, and for extinguishing the Vicarial Tithes in the Parish of Richmond, and for other Purposes relating to such Vicarages.
Newcastle-upon-Tyne and Carlisle Railway (Alston Branch) Act 1849	12 & 13 Vict. c. xliii	13 July 1849
An Act to authorize the Newcastle-upon-Tyne and Carlisle Railway Company to alter the Alston Branch of their Railway, to make a Branch Railway therefrom, and for other Purposes.
Truro and Redruth Turnpike Roads Act 1849	12 & 13 Vict. c. xliv	13 July 1849
An Act for consolidating the Trusts of the Truro Turnpike Roads and the Penryn and Redruth Turnpike Roads in the County of Cornwall, and for making a new Turnpike Road from Bosvigo Bridge to the Turnpike Road from Truro to Redruth, and for making the Road or Highway from Ferris Town to Bosvigo Bridge a Turnpike Road, and for maintaining all such Roads; and for other Purposes.
Congleton Common Land Act 1849	12 & 13 Vict. c. xlv	13 July 1849
An Act for amending an Act passed in the Thirty-fifth Year of the Reign of His Majesty King George the Third (Note: Congleton Inclosure Act 1795 (35 Geo. 3. c. 56 Pr.)) for dividing and leasing or letting certain Commons or Waste Grounds within the Borough and Township of Congleton in the County of Chester, and for applying the Profits of Part of the same in aid of the Poor's Rate or other Taxes or public Expenses within the said Township.
Renfrewshire Justice of Peace Courts Act 1849	12 & 13 Vict. c. xlvi	13 July 1849
An Act to facilitate the Prosecution of Criminal Offences before Her Majesty's Justices of the Peace in the County of Renfrew, and to simplify the Proceedings therein and lessen the Costs thereof.
Surrey and Sussex Roads Act 1849 (repealed)	12 & 13 Vict. c. xlvii	13 July 1849
An Act to alter and amend an Act passed in the Ninth Year of the Reign of His Majesty King George the Fourth, intituled "An Act for more effectually amending the Road leading from the Stones End in Blackman Street in the Borough of Southwark in the County of Surrey to Highgate in the County of Sussex, and several other Roads therein mentioned, and for other Purposes relating thereto." (Note: Southwark and Highgate (Sussex) Road Act 1828 (9 Geo. 4. c. cxx)) (Repealed by Surrey and Sussex Roads Act 1850 (13 & 14 Vict. c. lxxxv))
Great Yarmouth Haven, Bridge and Navigation Act 1849	12 & 13 Vict. c. xlviii	13 July 1849
An Act for the Improvement of the Haven, Bridge, and Navigation of Great Yarmouth in the County of Norfolk.
Westhead's Patent Act 1849	12 & 13 Vict. c. xlix	13 July 1849
An Act for rendering valid certain Letters Patent granted to Joshua Procter Westhead of Manchester, Manufacturer.
Lancashire and Yorkshire Railway Act 1849	12 & 13 Vict. c. l	13 July 1849
An Act to alter, amend, extend, and enlarge some of the Provisions of the several Acts relating to the Lancashire and Yorkshire Railway, and for making Extensions of some of the Branches of the said Railway, and for making other Provisions in relation to the said Railway and to the Lancashire and Yorkshire Railway Company.
Charing Cross Bridge Approaches Act 1849	12 & 13 Vict. c. li	13 July 1849
An Act for improving the Approaches to the Charing Cross Bridge on the Surrey Side thereof, and for amending the Acts relating thereto; for authorizing the raising of a farther Sum of Money, and for other Purposes.
Ely and Huntingdon Railway Act 1849 (repealed)	12 & 13 Vict. c. lii	13 July 1849
An Act for extending the Time and Powers for making the Ely and Huntingdon Railway, and for amending the Act (Note: East Anglian Railways Act 1847 (10 & 11 Vict. c. cclxxv)) relating to the East Anglian Railways. (Repealed by Great Eastern Railway Act 1862 (25 & 26 Vict. c. ccxxiii))
East Lothian Central Railway Act 1849	12 & 13 Vict. c. liii	13 July 1849
An Act for the Dissolution of the East Lothian Central Railway Company, and for the Abandonment of the Railway.
Stockton and Darlington Railway (Consolidation of Acts, Increase of Capital and Purchase of Middlesbrough Dock) Act 1849 or the Stockton and Darlington Railway Act 1849	12 & 13 Vict. c. liv	13 July 1849
An Act to consolidate the several Acts relating to the Stockton and Darlington Railway Company, to enable the Company to alter their Line of Railway in the Parishes of Egglescliffe and Stockton-on-Tees, and to increase their Capital, and to vest in them the Middlesbrough Dock.
Shrewsbury and Chester Railway (Dee Branches) Act 1849	12 & 13 Vict. c. lv	13 July 1849
An Act to authorize the Shrewsbury and Chester Railway Company to make certain Branches to the River Dee, with Wharfs and other Conveniences connected therewith, to enter into Agreements for a joint Station at Shrewsbury, and to subscribe towards the Shrewsbury and Hereford Railway.
Torquay Market Act 1849 (repealed)	12 & 13 Vict. c. lvi	13 July 1849
An Act for regulating and maintaining Markets in the Town of Torquay in the County of Devon, and for constructing convenient Market Places therein. (Repealed by Torquay Market Act 1852 (15 & 16 Vict. c. cxxxviii))
Wisbech and Chatteris Turnpike Road Act 1849	12 & 13 Vict. c. lvii	13 July 1849
An Act for repairing the Road leading from Chatteris Ferry to Wisbech, and from thence to Tid Gote in the Isle of Ely and to Downham Bridge in the County of Norfolk, and to authorize the Conversion of the Wisbech and March Low Road into Turnpike.
York, Newcastle and Berwick Railway Act 1849	12 & 13 Vict. c. lviii	13 July 1849
An Act for enabling the York, Newcastle, and Berwick Railway Company to make certain Branches in the Counties of Northumberland and Newcastle-upon-Tyne; and for other Purposes.
Black Sluice Drainage Amendment Act 1849	12 & 13 Vict. c. lix	13 July 1849
An Act to alter and amend the Provisions of the several Acts relating to the Black Sluice Drainage, to extend the Time by "The Black Sluice Drainage Act, 1846," (Note: Black Sluice Drainage Act 1846 (9 & 10 Vict. c. ccxcvii)) limited for the Completion of the Works, to authorize the levying and raising of further Rates and Monies, to alter existing Rates and Tolls, and for other Purposes.
York and North Midland Railway Act 1849	12 & 13 Vict. c. lx	13 July 1849
An Act for enabling the York and North Midland Railway Company to divert their Railways between Market Weighton and Beverley and Copmanthorpe and Tadcaster, all in the County of York; and for other Purposes.
Dowlais Railway Act 1849 (repealed)	12 & 13 Vict. c. lxi	28 July 1849
An Act for making a Branch from the Taff Vale Railway to Dowlais, and for other Purposes. (Repealed by Merthyr Tydfil Corporation Act 1948 (11 & 12 Geo. 6. c. xlii))
Irish South Eastern Railway Act 1849	12 & 13 Vict. c. lxii	28 July 1849
An Act to amend the Acts relating to the Irish Southeastern Railway.
East and West Lanarkshire Turnpike Roads Act 1849	12 & 13 Vict. c. lxiii	28 July 1849
An Act for maintaining, improving, and keeping in repair certain Roads in the County of Lanark to be called "The East and West Lanarkshire Turnpike Roads."
Tinsley and Doncaster Turnpike Road Extension Act 1849 (repealed)	12 & 13 Vict. c. lxiv	28 July 1849
An Act to extend the present Tinsley and Doncaster Turnpike Road from Tinsley to Sheffield, and for other Purposes. (Repealed by Annual Turnpike Acts Continuance Act 1869 (32 & 33 Vict. c. 90))
Flimwell Vent to Hastings Road Act 1849	12 & 13 Vict. c. lxv	28 July 1849
An Act for more effectually managing and repairing the Road leading from Flimwell Vent in the County of Sussex to the Town and Port of Hastings in the said County.
New North Road Act 1849 or the New North Road (Middlesex) Act 1849	12 & 13 Vict. c. lxvi	28 July 1849
An Act for continuing the Term of an Act passed in the Third Year of the Reign of His Majesty King William the Fourth, intituled "An Act for continuing certain Powers to the Trustees of the New North Road, leading from the South End of Highbury Race, Islington, to Haberdashers Walk in the Parish of Saint Leonard Shoreditch in the County of Middlesex," (Note: New North Road Act 1833 (3 & 4 Will. 4. c. lxxxv)) and for vesting the Management of the said Road in the Metropolis Roads Commissioners, for the Purpose of paying off the Debt due thereon.
Caledonian Railway (Wishaw and Coltness Railway Purchase) Act 1849	12 & 13 Vict. c. lxvii	28 July 1849
An Act to effect the Sale of the Wishaw and Coltness Railway to the Caledonian Railway Company.
Dublin, Ashbourne, Slane and Drogheda Roads Act 1849	12 & 13 Vict. c. lxviii	28 July 1849
An Act to continue and amend the Powers of an Act (Note: Dublin, Slane and Drogheda Road Act 1827 (7 & 8 Geo. 4. c. lxvi)) for repairing and improving the Roads from Dublin, by Ashbourne, to Slane and Drogheda.
Kingston-upon-Hull Dock Act 1849	12 & 13 Vict. c. lxix	28 July 1849
An Act for enabling the Dock Company at Kingston-upon-Hull to raise a further Sum of Money; and for amending some of the Provisions of the Acts relating to such Company.
Rock Life Assurance Act 1849	12 & 13 Vict. c. lxx	28 July 1849
An Act for better enabling the Rock Life Assurance Company to sue and be sued, and to alter certain Provisions of their Deed of Settlement, and to give further Powers to the Company.
East Lancashire Railway Act 1849	12 & 13 Vict. c. lxxi	28 July 1849
An Act to amend the Acts relating to the East Lancashire Railway Company, and to enable the same Company to make certain Branches at Preston.
Edinburgh and Glasgow Railway (Wilsontown, Morningside and Coltness Railway Transfer) Act 1849 (repealed)	12 & 13 Vict. c. lxxii	28 July 1849
An Act to authorize the Transfer of the Wilsontown, Morningside, and Coltness Railway to, and to vest the same in, the Edinburgh and Glasgow Railway Company. (Repealed by Edinburgh and Glasgow Railway Consolidation Act 1852 (15 & 16 Vict. c. cix))
London and Blackwall Railway Amendment and Extension of Time Act 1849	12 & 13 Vict. c. lxxiii	28 July 1849
An Act to extend the Time for the Purchase of Lands required for the widening of the London and Blackwall Railway, and to amend the Acts relating to such Railway.
Lancashire and Yorkshire and London and North Western Railways (Preston and Wyre Railway, Harbour and Dock Vesting) Act 1849	12 & 13 Vict. c. lxxiv	28 July 1849
An Act for vesting in the Lancashire and Yorkshire Railway Company and the London and North-western Railway Company the Preston and Wyre Railway, Harbour, and Dock, and all the Works, Property, and Effects belonging thereto.
Sheffield Canal Transfer Act 1849	12 & 13 Vict. c. lxxv	28 July 1849
An Act to transfer the Sheffield Canal to the Company of Proprietors of the Navigation of the River Dun.
Commercial Roads Continuation Act 1849	12 & 13 Vict. c. lxxvi	1 August 1849
An Act for more effectually repairing the Commercial Road, and other Roads connected therewith, in the Counties of Middlesex and Essex.
Bowling Iron Company Act 1849	12 & 13 Vict. c. lxxvii	1 August 1849
An Act for confirming and carrying into effect an Arrangement made by the Court of Chancery concerning the Proprietors of the Bowling Iron Company, and for granting certain Powers to the said Company.
Louth Markets and Fairs Act 1849	12 & 13 Vict. c. lxxviii	1 August 1849
An Act for regulating and improving the Markets and Fairs in the Borough of Louth in the County of Lincoln.
Edinburgh and Northern Railway (Granton Pier, &c.) Act 1849	12 & 13 Vict. c. lxxix	1 August 1849
An Act to enable the Edinburgh and Northern Railway Company to construct a Low-water Pier and other Works at Granton; and for other Purposes.
Consumption Hospital Act 1849	12 & 13 Vict. c. lxxx	1 August 1849
An Act to incorporate the Governors of the Hospital for Consumption and Diseases of the Chest, and to authorize the Establishment of a Chapel in connexion with the said Hospital, and to enable the said Governors the better to carry on their charitable Designs.
Manchester, Sheffield and Lincolnshire Railway Act 1849	12 & 13 Vict. c. lxxxi	1 August 1849
An Act to consolidate into One Act and to amend the Provisions of the several Railway and Dock Acts relating to the Manchester, Sheffield, and Lincolnshire Railway Company, and to amend their Canal Acts.
Binbrooke Inclosure Amendment Act 1849	12 & 13 Vict. c. lxxxii	1 August 1849
An Act to amend and extend the Provisions of certain Acts for inclosing Lands in the Parishes of Binbrooke Saint Mary and Binbrooke Saint Gabriel in the County of Lincoln, and to vary the Awards made thereunder, and to unite the said Parishes.
Great Indian Peninsula Railway Company Act 1849 (repealed)	12 & 13 Vict. c. lxxxiii	1 August 1849
An Act to incorporate the Great Indian Peninsula Railway Company, and for other Purposes connected therewith. (Repealed by Statute Law (Repeals) Act 2013 (c. 2))
Great Northern Railway Amendment Act 1849	12 & 13 Vict. c. lxxxiv	1 August 1849
An Act to amend the Acts relating to the Great Northern Railway, and to make a Diversion of such Railway at Bentley-with-Arksey in the West Riding of Yorkshire, and to enlarge the Boston, Lincoln, and London Stations of such Railway.
Shrewsbury and Birmingham Railway Amendment Act 1849	12 & 13 Vict. c. lxxxv	1 August 1849
An Act to alter and amend some of the Powers and Provisions of the Shrewsbury and Birmingham Railway Acts, and to authorize the Formation of certain Branch Railways, a navigable Canal, and other Works connected with the same respectively; and for other Purposes.
Stirling and Dunfermline Railway (Deviation, Extension of Time and Amendment) Act 1849	12 & 13 Vict. c. lxxxvi	1 August 1849
An Act to authorize a Deviation of the Branch Line of the Stirling and Dunfermline Railway to Alloa Harbour, and the Diversion of certain Works; to extend the Time for the compulsory Purchase of certain Lands; and for other Purposes.
Lancaster and Preston Junction Railway Amendment Act 1849	12 & 13 Vict. c. lxxxvii	1 August 1849
An Act to amend the several Acts relating to the Lancaster and Preston Junction Railway Company, and to transfer the Management of the Railway to the Lancaster and Carlisle Railway Company.
Glasgow, Kilmarnock and Ardrossan Railway Amendment Act 1849	12 & 13 Vict. c. lxxxviii	1 August 1849
An Act to amend and enlarge the Powers and Provisions of the Acts relating to the Ardrossan Harbour and to the Glasgow, Kilmarnock, and Ardrossan Railway.
Airdrie Police and Municipal Act 1849	12 & 13 Vict. c. lxxxix	1 August 1849
An Act to amend and extend and partly repeal the Provisions of an Act of Parliament (Note: Airdrie Improvement Act 1821 (1 & 2 Geo. 4. c. lx)) for erecting the Town of Airdrie into a Burgh; to provide for the Municipal and Police Government of said Burgh, and for the better paving, watching, lighting, and cleansing, and for regulating the Police, and managing the Statute Labour of the said Burgh; for consolidating the Provisions of other Acts; and for other Purposes relating thereto.
Caledonian Railway (Glasgow, Barrhead and Neilston Direct Railway Lease) Act 1849	12 & 13 Vict. c. xc	1 August 1849
An Act to effectuate a Lease of the Glasgow, Barrhead, and Neilston Direct Railway to the Caledonian Railway Company.
General Land Drainage and Improvement Company Act 1849 (repealed)	12 & 13 Vict. c. xci	1 August 1849
An Act for the Incorporation of the General Land Drainage and Improvement Company, and for facilitating the Execution of Land Drainage and other Improvements. (Repealed by Statute Law Revision Act 1964 (c. 79))
Eastern Union Railway Amendment Act 1849 (repealed)	12 & 13 Vict. c. xcii	1 August 1849
An Act to amend the Acts relating to the Eastern Union Railway Company. (Repealed by Great Eastern Railway Act 1862 (25 & 26 Vict. c. ccxxiii))
East Indian Railway Act 1849 (repealed)	12 & 13 Vict. c. xciii	1 August 1849
An Act for incorporating the East Indian Railway Company, and for other Purposes connected therewith. (Repealed by Statute Law (Repeals) Act 2013 (c. 2))
City of London Elections Act 1849	12 & 13 Vict. c. xciv	1 August 1849
An Act to amend an Act passed in the Eleventh Year of the Reign of King George the First, (Note: City of London Elections Act 1724 (11 Geo. 1. c. 18)) for regulating Elections within the City of London, and for preserving the Peace, good Order, and Government of the said City.
Norfolk Estuary Amendment Act 1849 (repealed)	12 & 13 Vict. c. xcv	1 August 1849
An Act to amend the "Norfolk Estuary Act, 1846," (Note: Norfolk Estuary Act 1846 (9 & 10 Vict. c. ccclxxxviii)) and to enable the Eau Brink Commissioners and the Corporation of King's Lynn to contribute towards the Undertaking, and for other Purposes connected therewith. (Repealed by Norfolk Estuary Act 1857 (20 & 21 Vict. c. cxlvi))

=== Private acts ===
Short title	Citation	Royal assent
Long title
Society for the Prosecution of Felons Distribution of Funds Act 1849	12 & 13 Vict. c. 1 Pr.	26 June 1849
An Act to enable the Trustees of a Society called or known by the Name of "The Society for the Prosecution of Felons and Receivers of Stolen Goods" to distribute the Monies and Funds of the said Society amongst certain charitable Institutions.
Abdy's Estate Act 1849	12 & 13 Vict. c. 2 Pr.	26 June 1849
An Act for authorizing the Sale and Exchange of certain Freehold and Copyhold Lands and Hereditaments forming Part of the Estate of the late Charles Hayes Esquire, and for authorizing certain Leases to be granted thereof; and for authorizing the Sale and Exchange of certain Freehold and Copyhold Lands and Hereditaments forming Part of the Estate of the late John Rutherforth Abdy Esquire, and for enabling the Trustees of this Act to shift the Charges affecting the Inheritance of the last-mentioned Lands and Hereditaments; and for other Purposes.
Williams's Estate Act 1849	12 & 13 Vict. c. 3 Pr.	26 June 1849
An Act to authorize the granting of Building Leases of the Estates devised by the Will of Richard Morris Griffith Gentleman, deceased, called Caemaeslodig, situate in the Parish of Bangor in the County of Carnarvon.
Dean and Chapter of Canterbury's Walworth Estate Act 1849	12 & 13 Vict. c. 4 Pr.	13 July 1849
An Act for confirming Two several Indentures of Lease, dated respectively the Twenty-sixth Day of June One thousand seven hundred and eighty-six, respectively granted by the Dean and Chapter of the Cathedral and Metropolitical Church of Christ Canterbury and Henry Penton to Thomas Clutton, of Hereditaments situate at Walworth in the Parish of Saint Mary Newington in the County of Surrey, and for settling the Boundaries of the Hereditaments thereby intended to be demised.
Borough of Louth and Free Grammar School in Louth Act 1849	12 & 13 Vict. c. 5 Pr.	28 July 1849
An Act for settling all Questions of disputed Ownership between the Mayor, Aldermen, and Burgesses of the Borough of Louth and the Warden and Six Assistants of the Town of Louth and Free School of King Edward the Sixth in Louth, with reference to the Lands, Tenements, Fairs, Markets, Rents, Tolls, Powers, Rights, Privileges, and Property claimed by them respectively; and for vesting the Fairs and Markets within the said Borough in the Mayor, Aldermen, and Burgesses thereof; and for other Purposes.
Lee's Estate Act 1849	12 & 13 Vict. c. 6 Pr.	28 July 1849
An Act to authorize the Sale of Part of the Estates devised by William Lee Anionic Esquire, deceased, and for applying the Proceeds in Payment of certain Incumbrances, and in Purchase of Hereditaments to be limited to the Uses declared of certain Estates substituted and settled by an Act of the Second and Third Years of the Reign of King William the Fourth, intituled "An Act for vetting the Fee Simple of Part of the Freehold Estates devised by the Will of William Lee Antonie Esquire, deceased, in strict Settlement, in his Nephew John Lee Esquire, Doctor of Laws, (subject to a Term of Five hundred Years, as an Indemnification against a Sum of Ten thousand Pounds and Interest,) and for substituting Part of the Fee Simple Estates of the said John Lee in lieu thereof, and also for appointing new Trustees of the said settled Estates;" (Note: William Antonie's Estate Act 1832 (2 & 3 Will. 4. c. 30 Pr.)) and to amend the said Act.
Honourable Robert Henry Clive's Estate Act 1849	12 & 13 Vict. c. 7 Pr.	28 July 1849
An Act to enable Leases for Mining Purposes to be granted to Anthony Hill Esquire of Parts of the Estate situate in the Parish of Merthyr Tydvil in the County of Glamorgan, devised by the Will of the Right Honourable Other Archer Earl of Plymouth, deceased; and for other Purposes.
Aberdeen Destitute Female Orphan Asylum (Davidson's) Estate Act 1849	12 & 13 Vict. c. 8 Pr.	28 July 1849
An Act to incorporate, by the Name of "The Trustees of the Hospital in Aberdeen for Orphan and Destitute Female Children," "The Trustees of the Aberdeen Destitute Female Orphan Asylum" acting under a Deed of Constitution granted by the Trustees of John Gordon of Murtle, Esquire, deceased, and to alter and extend the Powers and Provisions of the said Deed, and to vest the Residue of the Estate and Effects of John Carnegie Esquire, deceased, in the Trustees so incorporated.
Duke of Norfolk's (Duke of Sutherland's) Estate Act 1849	12 & 13 Vict. c. 9 Pr.	28 July 1849
An Act to enable the Trustees of the Settlement made in pursuance of the Will of George Granville late Duke of Sutherland to grant or demise for a long Term of Years to the Staffordshire Potteries Waterworks Company certain Springs and Reservoirs of Water in Lands in the Parishes of Caverswall and Stone in the County of Stafford comprised in the said Settlement, and certain Waterworks, Rights, and Privileges for supplying with Water the Towns of Longton and Lane End in the said County, and several Townships or Places near thereto; and to enable the said Trustees to take Shares in the said Company, and to advance Money to the said Company on Mortgage; and for other Purposes.
Ladykirk (Robertson's) Estate Act 1849	12 & 13 Vict. c. 10 Pr.	28 July 1849
An Act to enable Marianne Sarah Robertson of Ladykirk to disentail certain detached Portions of the entailed Estate of Ladykirk, to be conveyed to David Robertson her Husband in lieu of the Lands of Simprim, to be added by him to the said entailed Estate; to grant Security upon the said Estate for a certain Sum of Money expended in Improvements; and for other Purposes relating thereto.
Withdean Estate Act 1849	12 & 13 Vict. c. 11 Pr.	28 July 1849
An Act for enabling the Trustees of the Settlement made under Orders of the High Court of Chancery, after the Marriage of Chaloner Ogle Esquire and Elisa Sophia Frances Ogle his Wife, to grant Building, Improving, and other Leases of certain Estates and Hereditaments situate at Patcham in the County of Sussex, comprised in the said Settlement.
Reynold's Estate Act 1849	12 & 13 Vict. c. 12 Pr.	28 July 1849
An Act for vesting the Cole and Reynolds Estates, situate at Doddington, Leverington, Guyhurn, Broughton, and Buckden, in the Isle of Ely and Counties of Cambridge and Huntingdon, in Trustees for Sale.
Rickard's (or Harman's) Estate Act 1849	12 & 13 Vict. c. 13 Pr.	28 July 1849
An Act to authorize the Trustees of the Will of the late Anthony Harmon Esquire to grant Building, Improving, and other Leases of certain Freehold Estates devised by the said Will.
Gordon's (Cairness) Estate Act 1849	12 & 13 Vict. c. 14 Pr.	28 July 1849
An Act for authorizing the Trustees of the late Thomas Gordon to sell his Estates of Cairness and others in the County of Aberdeen, and to apply the Price thereof in Payment of the Debts and Burdens affecting the same; and for laying out the Residue of the Price in the Purchase of other Lands, to be entailed in Terms of the Trust Deed of Settlement by the said Thomas Gordon; and for other Purposes.
Hurd's Estate Act 1849	12 & 13 Vict. c. 15 Pr.	28 July 1849
An Act to confirm the Title of the Trustees of the Will of Philip Hurd Esquire, deceased, to a Copyhold Estate at Kentish Town in the County of Middlesex; and to extend the Power to grant Building Leases contained in the said Will; and to empower the Trustees of the said Will to raise Money for the Improvement of the said Estate; and for other Purposes.
Lord Brougham and Vaux (Duke of Cleveland's) Estate Act 1849	12 & 13 Vict. c. 16 Pr.	28 July 1849
An Act to enable the Trustees of the Will of the late Duke of Cleveland to raise certain Monies on the Trust Estates in the County of Durham by the said Will devised, and for the Management of the said Estates.
Trenchard's Estate Act 1849	12 & 13 Vict. c. 17 Pr.	1 August 1849
An Act for enabling the Trustees of the Will of William Trenchard Esquire, deceased, to pull down the Mansion or Dwelling House at Lytchet Matravers in the County of Dorset, and the Stables, Offices, and Outbuildings belonging thereto, Part of the Estates devised by the said Will, and to rebuild a smaller Mansion, Stabling, and Outbuildings suitable to the same; and to pull down Farm Buildings on the said Estates, and to rebuild the same; and to convert Shrubberies and Pleasure Grounds into Arable and Pasture Lands; and to raise Money for these Purposes by the Sale of Part of the Capital of the Personal Estate of the said William Trenchard deceased; and for other Purposes.
Cresswell's (or Bateman's) Estate Act 1849	12 & 13 Vict. c. 18 Pr.	1 August 1849
An Act for vesting the Real Estates devised by the Will of the late Sir Hugh Bateman of Hartington Hall in the County of Derby, Baronet, in Trustees, upon trust to sell a Part thereof, and to lay out the Monies arising from such Sale in Payment of the Mortgage Debts and other Charges and Incumbrances affecting the said Estates, and in Repairs and substantial Improvements upon the said Estates; and for other Purposes.
Grenville's Estate Act 1849	12 & 13 Vict. c. 19 Pr.	1 August 1849
An Act for the better Administration of the Real and Personal Estates of the Right Honourable James Lord Glastonbury deceased.
Pattingham and Patshull (Staffordshire) Inclosure Act 1849	12 & 13 Vict. c. 20 Pr.	1 August 1849
An Act to remove Doubts relative to the Appointment of Mr. George Bishton as a Commissioner under the Pattingham and Patshull Inclosure Act. (Note: Pattingham and Patshull (Staffordshire) Inclosure Act 1799 (39 Geo. 3. c. 95 Pr.))
Honourable C. C. Cavendish's (Burlington House) Estate Act 1849	12 & 13 Vict. c. 21 Pr.	1 August 1849
An Act for removing Doubts relative to the Powers of granting Building Leases contained in the Will of the Right Honourable George Augustus Henry Earl of Burlington deceased; and for other Purposes.
W. H. F. Cavendish's Estate Act 1849	12 & 13 Vict. c. 22 Pr.	1 August 1849
An Act for supplying the Omission in the Will of the Right Honourable George Augustus Henry Earl of Burlington deceased of Powers of granting Farming and Building Leases of the Estates in the Counties of York and Derby devised by the same Will; of Powers of selling and exchanging the same Estates; and for other Purposes.
Wilson's (Saint Thomas' Church Woolwich) Estate Act 1849	12 & 13 Vict. c. 23 Pr.	1 August 1849
An Act to enable Sir Thomas Maryon Wilson Baronet to grant the Site of a Church for "The District of Saint Thomas, Woolwich," in the County of Kent; and for other Purposes.
Osborn's Estate Act 1849	12 & 13 Vict. c. 24 Pr.	1 August 1849
An Act for authorizing the Sale of certain Parts of the Estates in the County of Middlesex devised by the Will of Sir George Osborn Baronet, deceased, for the Purpose of discharging the Incumbrances thereon.
Tempest's Estate Act 1849	12 & 13 Vict. c. 25 Pr.	1 August 1849
An Act to authorize the granting of Building Leases of Parts of the Estates devised by the Will of the late Henry Blundell Esquire, situate in the Townships of Heaton and Rumworth in the County of Lancaster, and to lease Coal and other Mines, and to grant Farming Leases for Twenty-one Years of Lands within the said Townships; and for other Purposes.
Theophilus Clive's Estate Act 1849	12 & 13 Vict. c. 26 Pr.	1 August 1849
An Act for the Sale of certain Hereditaments in the Parish of Barkham in the County of Berks affected by the Settlement made on the Marriage of Theophilus Clive Esquire.
Waldy's Divorce Act 1849 (Note: This act was not printed by the Queen's Printer.)	12 & 13 Vict. c. 27 Pr.	3 April 1849
An Act to dissolve the Marriage of Thomas William Waldy Esquire with Ellen his now Wife, and to enable him to marry again; and for other Purposes.
James's Divorce Act 1849	12 & 13 Vict. c. 28 Pr.	26 June 1849
An Act to dissolve the Marriage of John James with his now Wife, and to enable him to marry again; and for other Purposes.
Hoghton's Divorce Act 1849	12 & 13 Vict. c. 29 Pr.	28 July 1849
An Act to dissolve the Marriage of Henry Hoghton Esquire with Louisa Josephine Hoghton his now Wife, and to enable him to marry again; and for other Purposes.
Hudson's Divorce Act 1849	12 & 13 Vict. c. 30 Pr.	28 July 1849
An Act to dissolve the Marriage of Francis Hudson Merchant with Louisa his now Wife, and to enable him to marry again; and for other Purposes therein mentioned.
Tufton's Naturalization Act 1849	12 & 13 Vict. c. 31 Pr.	1 August 1849
An Act for naturalizing Richard Tufton and Henry Tufton his infant Son.
Cripps's Divorce Act 1849	12 & 13 Vict. c. 32 Pr.	1 August 1849
An Act to dissolve the Marriage of Edward Cripps Esquire with Augusta Sarah his now Wife, and to enable him to marry again; and for other Purposes.
Faussett's Divorce Act 1849	12 & 13 Vict. c. 33 Pr.	1 August 1849
An Act to dissolve the Marriage of the Reverend Bryan Faussett with Helena Caroline his Wife, and to enable him to marry again; and for other Purposes.
Hill's Divorce Act 1849	12 & 13 Vict. c. 34 Pr.	1 August 1849
An Act to dissolve the Marriage of Edward Eustace Hill Esquire with the Honourable Georgiana Charlotte, commonly called Lady Georgiana Charlotte, his now Wife, and to enable him to marry again; and for other Purposes.

=== Sources ===
- The Statutes of the United Kingdom of Great Britain and Northern Ireland, 12 & 13 Victoria. 1849. 1849 – via Internet Archive.
- The Statutes of the United Kingdom of Great Britain and Northern Ireland, 12 & 13 Victoria. 1849. 1849 – via Google Books.
- A Collection of the Public General Statutes passed in Twelfth and Thirteenth Years of the Reign of Her Majesty Queen Victoria, 1849. London: Eyre and Spottiswoode. 1849 – via Internet Archive.

== See also ==
- List of acts of the Parliament of the United Kingdom
