= Fairlie railway station =

Railway station in North Ayrshire, Scotland

Fairlie Scottish Gaelic: Fairlidh
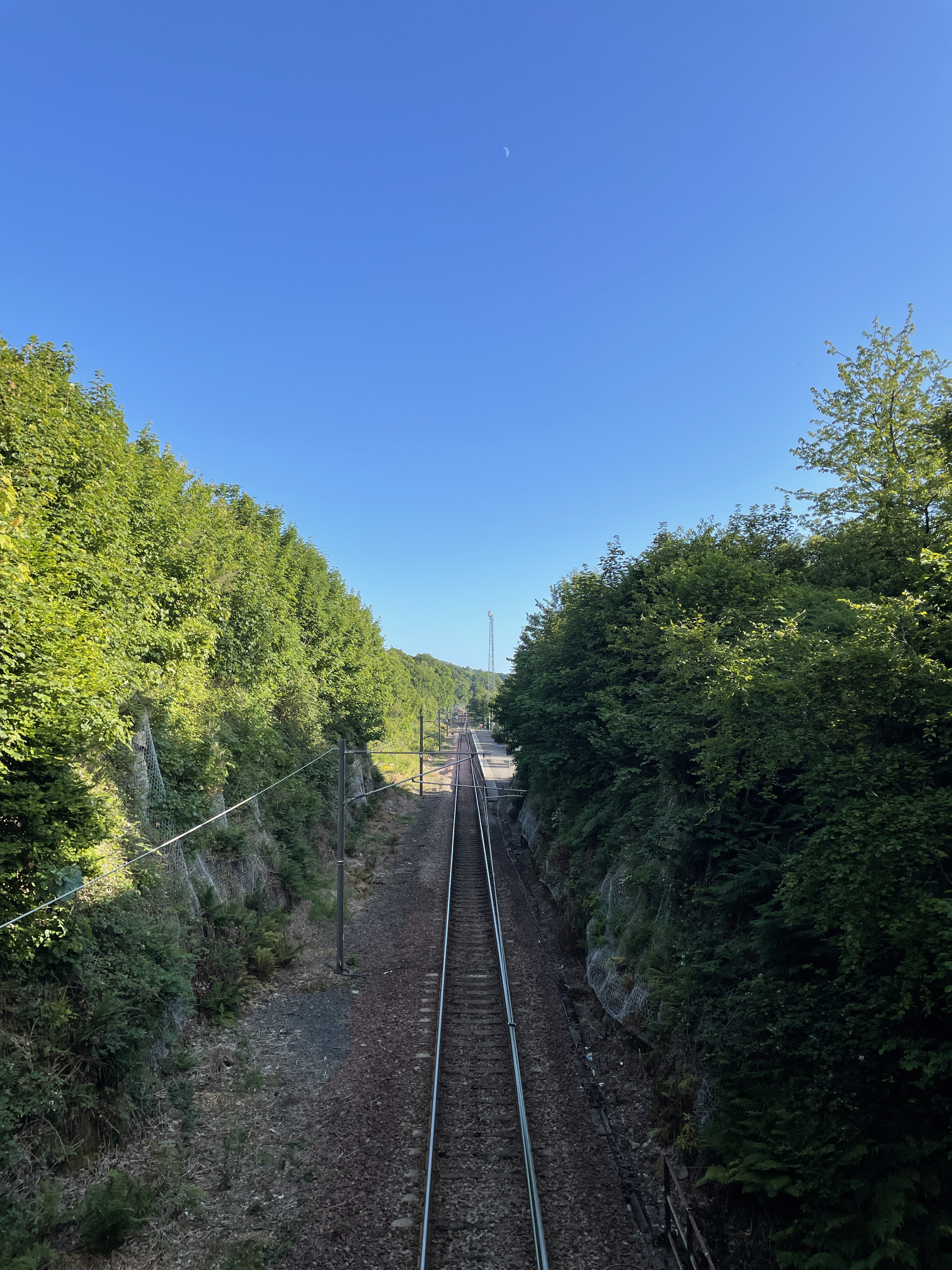
- Fairlie station viewed from the overbridge further North up the track

General information
- Location: Fairlie, North Ayrshire; Scotland
- Coordinates: 55.7515°N 4.8532°W
- Grid reference: NS209546
- Manager: ScotRail
- Transit authority: SPT
- Platforms: 1

Other information
- Station code: FRL

History
- Original company: G&SWR Largs Branch
- Post-grouping: LMS

Key dates
- 1 June 1880: Opened as Fairlie
- 30 June 1952: Renamed Fairlie Town
- 2 March 1953: Renamed Fairlie High
- 1980s: Renamed Fairlie

Passengers
- 2021/22: ▲20,370
- 2022/23: ▲29,974
- 2023/24: ▲36,164
- 2024/25: ▲38,032
- 2025/26: ▼36,512
Location
Notes
- Passenger statistics from the Office of Rail and Road

Fairlie railway station serves the village of Fairlie, North Ayrshire, Scotland. The station is managed by ScotRail and is on the Ayrshire Coast Line.

== History ==
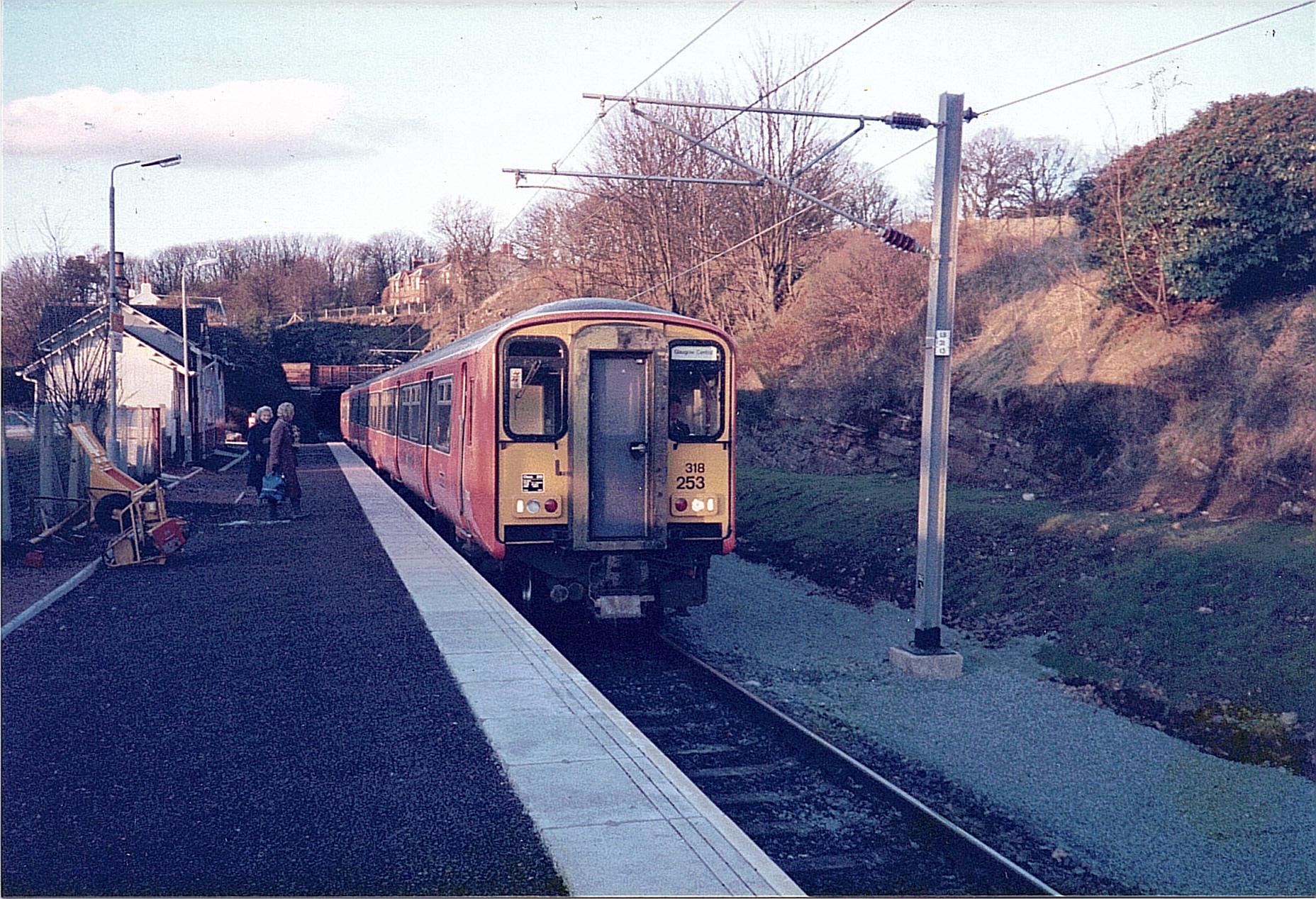
318 253 at Fairlie with a Glasgow bound train in the first month of electric trains to Largs

The station was originally opened on 1 June 1880 by the Glasgow and South Western Railway during the extension of the former Ardrossan Railway to Largs. It was renamed Fairlie Town on 30 June 1952, however this name was short-lived and the station became Fairlie High on 2 March 1953. A camping coach was positioned here by the Scottish Region from 1954 to 1955, two coaches from 1956 to 1957 and two coaches again from 1961 to 1963. The station was renamed back to its original title some time before 1986.

Following the construction of Hunterston A nuclear power station, a siding was provided for flask trains, which was subsequently used for Hunterston B. In the mid 1990s, this was moved to the Hunterston Ore Terminal.

Originally a two platform station, it now has only one platform, the former northbound platform. The southbound platform was demolished and its track removed as part of the electrification of the Largs branch of the Ayrshire Coast Line in 1986. The 1,004-yard (918 m) long Fairlie Tunnel is directly to the north of the station.

== Services ==
- 1tph to Largs
- 1tph to Glasgow Central via Kilwinning and Paisley Gilmour Street

The basic service runs throughout the week, including Sundays. Additional semi-fast trains run during the weekday business peaks.

| Preceding station | National Rail | Following station |
|---|---|---|
| Largs | ScotRail; Ayrshire Coast Line | West Kilbride |
| | Historical railways | |
| Largs; Line and station open | Glasgow and South Western Railway; Largs Branch | West Kilbride; Line and station open |
| Fairlie Pier; Line and station closed | Glasgow and South Western Railway; Largs Branch | West Kilbride; Line and station open |
