= Summary Jurisdiction (Ireland) Act 1850 =

Act of the Parliament of the United Kingdom

Summary Jurisdiction (Ireland) Act 1850 (Note: Section 63.)
- Act of Parliament
- Parliament of the United Kingdom
- Long title: An Act to consolidate and amend the Acts relating to certain Offences and other Matters as to which Justices of the Peace exercise a summary Jurisdiction in Ireland.
- Citation: 13 & 14 Vict. c. 102
- Territorial extent: Ireland (Note: Section 62.)

Dates
- Royal assent: 14 August 1850
- Commencement: 1 October 1850 (Note: Section 61.)
- Repealed: 1 November 1851
Other legislation
| Amends | See § Repealed enactments |
| Repeals/revokes | See § Repealed enactments |
| Repealed by | Summary Jurisdiction (Ireland) Act 1851 |

Status: Repealed

Text of statute as originally enacted

The Summary Jurisdiction (Ireland) Act 1850 (13 & 14 Vict. c. 102) was an act of the Parliament of the United Kingdom that consolidated enactments related to the summary jurisdiction of justices of the peace in Ireland.

== Provisions ==
=== Repealed enactments ===
Section 60 of the act repealed 19 enactments, listed in that section.

| Citation | Short title | Description | Extent of repeal |
|---|---|---|---|
| 5 Geo. 2. c. 12 (I) | Fireworks Act 1731 | An Act to prevent the throwing or firing of Squibs, Serpents, and other Fireworks. | The whole act. |
| 11 Geo. 3. c. 7 (I) | Obstruction of Trade Act 1770 | An Act passed in the Eleventh Year of King George the Third, intituled An Aet for punishing such Persons as shall do Injuries and Violence to the Persons or Properties of His Majesty's Subjects, with Intent to hinder the Exportation of Corn. | As relates to the Jurisdiction of Justices of the Peace as to summary Conviction. |
| 27 Geo. 3. c. 53 (I) | Turnpike Gates Destruction Prevention Act 1787 | An Act passed in the Twenty-seventh Year of the Reign of King George the Third, intituled An Act for preventing the wilful Destruction of Turnpike Gates, and for the better securing the Payment of Tolls at such Gates. | The whole act. |
| 49 Geo. 3. c. 84 | Highways (Ireland) Act 1809 | An Act passed in the Forty-ninth Year of the Reign of King George the Third, intituled An Act for amending the Irish Road Acts, as relates to the Mode in which Carriages and Persons shall pass each other on any public Road. | As relates to the Mode in which Carriages and Persons shall pass cach other on any public Road. |
| 50 Geo. 3. c. 32 | Stage Coaches, etc. (Ireland) Act 1810 | An Act passed in the Fifticth Year of the Reign of King George the Third, intituled An Act to repeal certain Parts of several Acts of the Parliament of Ireland, so far as relates to the limiting the Number of Persons to be carried by Stage Coaches or other Carriages, and for enacting other Limitations in lieu thereof, and for other Purposes relating thereto. | The whole act. |
| 54 Geo. 3. c. 116 | Recovery of Wages (Ireland) Act 1814 | An Act passed in the Fifty-fourth Year of King George the Third, intituled An Act to repeal the several Laws for Recovery of small Sums due for Wages in Ireland, and to make other Provisions for Recovery of such Wages. | The whole act. |
| 58 Geo. 3. c. 82 | Frauds in Sale of Grain (Ireland) Act 1818 | An Act passed in the Fifty-eighth Year of King George the Third, intituled An Act to prevent Frauds in the Sale of Grain in Ireland. | The whole act. |
| 4 Geo. 4. c. 34 | Master and Servant Act 1823 | An Act passed in the Ninth Year of King George the Fourth, intituled An Act passed in the Fourth Year of the Reign of King George the Fourth, intituled An Act to enlarge the Powers of Justices in determining Complaints between Masters and Servants, and between Masters, Apprentices, Artificers, and others. | As relates to Ireland. |
| 9 Geo. 4. c. 55 | Larceny (Ireland) Act 1828 | An Act passed in the Ninth Year of King George the Fourth, intituled Act for amending and consolidating the Laws in Ireland relative to Larceny, and other Offences connected therewith. | As relates to the Jurisdiction of Justices of the Peace as to summary Convictions. |
| 9 Geo. 4. c. 56 | Malicious Injuries to Property (Ireland) Act 1828 | An Act passed in the Ninth Year of King George the Fourth, intituled Act for consolidating the Laws in Ireland relative to malicious Injuries to Property. | As relates to the Jurisdiction of Justices of the Peace as to summary Convictions. |
| 10 Geo. 4. c. 34 | Offences Against the Person (Ireland) Act 1829 | An Act passed in the Tenth Year of King George the Fourth, intituled An Act for consolidating and amending the Statutes in Ireland relating to Offences against the Person. | As relates to the Jurisdiction of Justices of the Peace as to summary Convictions. |
| 4 & 5 Will. 4. c. 50 | Irish Roads Act 1834 | An Act to amend an Act passed in the Forty-ninth Year of the Reign of King George the Third, intituled An Act to amend an Act passed in the Forty-ninth Year of the Reign of King George the Third, for amending the Irish Road Acts | The whole act. |
| 6 & 7 Will. 4. c. 116 | Grand Jury (Ireland) Act 1836 | An Act passed in the Sixth and Seventh Years of the Reign of King William the Fourth, intituted an Act to consolidate and amend the Laws relating to the Presentment of public Money by Grand Juries in Ireland. | As relates to the summary Jurisdiction of Justices as to any of the Offences upon or relating to public Roads herein-before mentioned. |
| 7 & 8 Vict. c. 106 | County Dublin Grand Jury Act 1844 | An Act passed in the Seventh and Eighth Years of the Reign of Her Majesty, intituled An Act to consolidate and amend the Laws for the Regulation of Grand Jury Presentments in the County of Dublin. | As relates to the summary Jurisdiction of Justices as to any of the Offences upon or relating to public Roads herein-before mentioned |
| 11 & 12 Vict. c. 28 | Execution (Ireland) Act 1848 | An Act passed in the Eleventh and Twelfth Years of the Reign of Queen Victoria, intituled An Act to amend the Law of Imprisonment for Debt in Ireland, and to improve the Remedies for the Recovery of Debts and of the Possession of Tenements situate in Cities and Towns in certain Cases. | As relates to the Recovery of the Possession of small Tenements. |
| 11 & 12 Vict. c. 59 | Juvenile Offenders (Ireland) Act 1848 | An Act passed in the Eleventh and Twelfth Years of the Reign of Her Majesty, intituled An Act for the more speedy Trial and Punishment of Juvenile Offenders in Ireland. | The whole act. |
| 7 & 8 Vict. c. 8 | Teachers of Schools (Ireland) Act 1844 | An Act passed in the Seventh Year of Her Majesty, intituled An Act to facilitate the Recovery by summary Process of small Sums due to the Teachers of Schools in Ireland. | The whole act. |
| 12 & 13 Vict. c. 15 | Recovery of Wages (Ireland) Act 1849 | An Act passed in the Twelfth Year of Her Majesty, intituled An Act to amend an Act of the Fifty-fourth Year of King George the Third, for the Recovery of small Sums due for Wages in Ireland. | The whole act. |
| 12 & 13 Vict. c. 30 | Sheep Stealers (Ireland) Act 1849 | An Act for the better Preservation of Sheep, and more speedy Detection of Receivers of stolen Sheep, in Ireland. | The whole act. |

== Subsequent developments ==
The whole act was repealed by section 26 of the Summary Jurisdiction (Ireland) Act 1851 (14 & 15 Vict. c. 92), which came into force on 1 November 1851.
