= Largs railway station =

Railway station in North Ayrshire, Scotland

Largs Scottish Gaelic: An Leargaidh
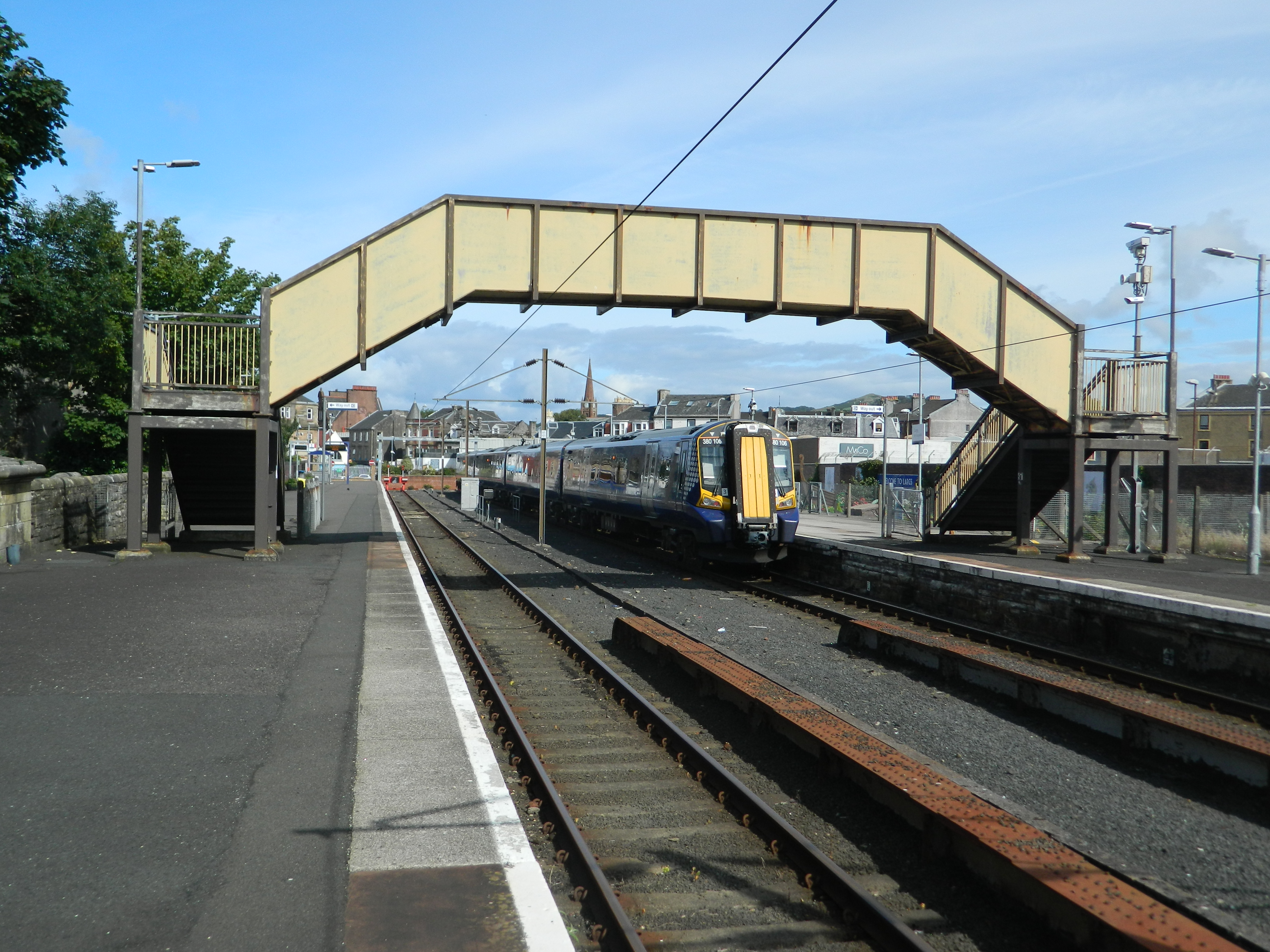
- The bridge and platforms at Largs. A Class 380 is about to depart for Glasgow Central

General information
- Location: Largs, North Ayrshire; Scotland
- Coordinates: 55.7928°N 4.8673°W
- Grid reference: NS202592
- Manager: ScotRail
- Transit authority: SPT
- Platforms: 2 (formerly 4)

Other information
- Station code: LAR

History
- Original company: G&SWR Largs Branch
- Post-grouping: LMS

Key dates
- 1 June 1885: Opened

Passengers
- 2021/22: ▲0.255 million
- 2022/23: ▲0.306 million
- 2023/24: ▲0.384 million
- 2024/25: ▲0.385 million
- 2025/26: ▲0.398 million
Location
Notes
- Passenger statistics from the Office of Rail and Road

Largs railway station is a railway station in the town of Largs, North Ayrshire, Scotland. The station is managed by ScotRail and is owned by Network Rail. It is on the Ayrshire Coast Line, 43 miles (69 km) south west of Glasgow Central.

== History ==
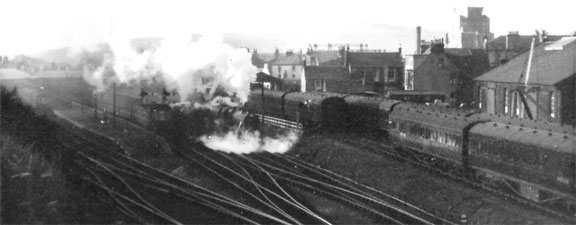
Largs station in the 1960s

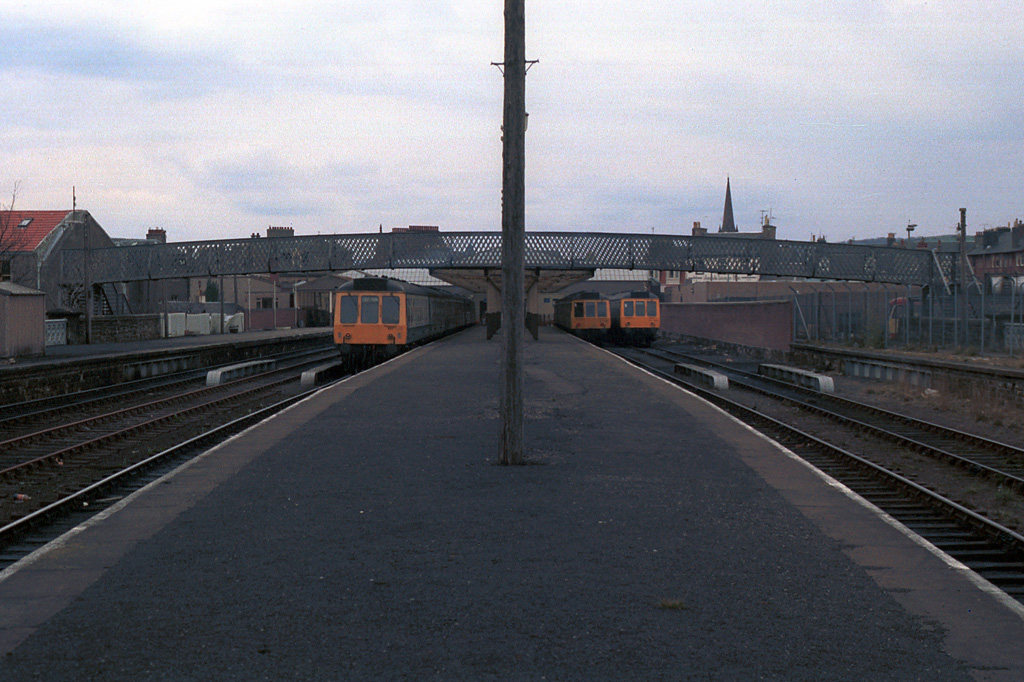
Three platforms and centre stabling lines in April 1984

The station was originally opened on 1 June 1885 by the Glasgow and South Western Railway, as the terminus of the extension of the former Ardrossan Railway to Largs.

The station originally had four platforms with additional stabling lines, a glazed canopy and a footbridge spanning the platforms.

By the time the electrification project commenced only three platforms and the centre stabling line were in operation. A fire in 1985 destroyed the station signal box and shortly afterwards work was undertaken to remodel & rationalise the track layout and modernise the signalling ahead of the planned electrification (as part of the wider Ayrshire Coast scheme). Once this was completed by British Rail in 1987, only two platforms remained in use with the line southwards having been reduced to single track. The standard 25 kV A.C overhead system was used, with the signalling system supervised from Paisley signalling centre.

== 1995 demolition in accident ==
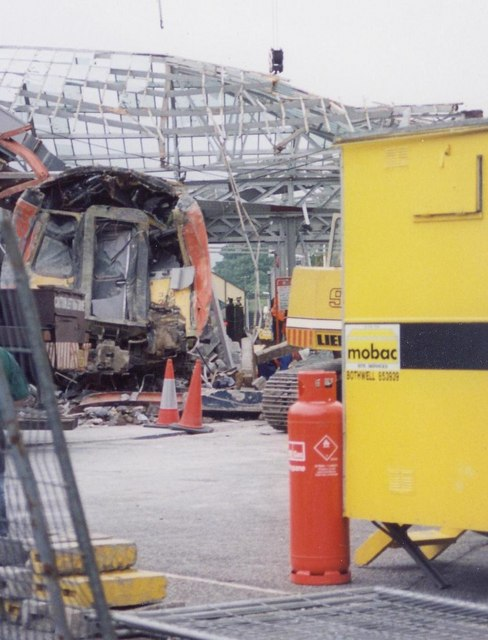
Aftermath of the accident

On 11 July 1995 an early morning Class 318 from Glasgow Central failed to stop. It crashed through the buffers and the back of the ticket office, severely damaging parts of the station building, and demolished two shops before coming to a stop next to the taxi rank on Main Street. An eye-witness described the noise with the station shaking as the train "was ploughing through it like a set of dominoes", then "the whole corner of the building disintegrating". Although the driver, the guard and three others suffered injuries, there was considerable relief that no-one was killed.

== Reconstruction: new station building ==
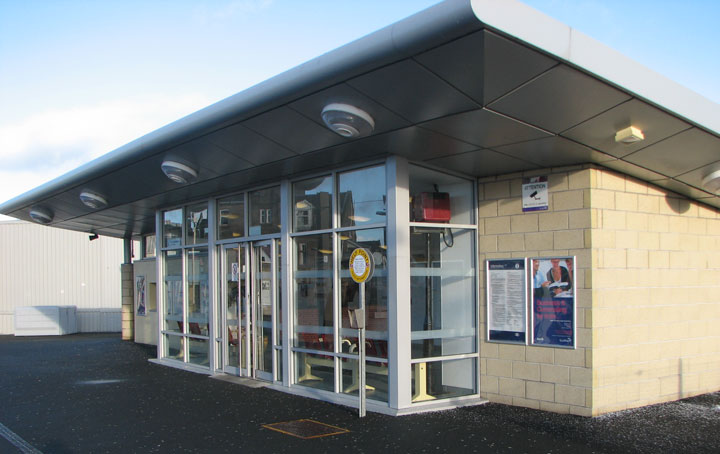
New station building

For several years there were discussions of redevelopment and replacement buildings, and in 2001 a small ticket office was constructed. A £200,000 makeover (including a new station building) was completed in 2005, albeit much simpler than the original.

== Services ==
There is an hourly service to and from Glasgow Central (including Sundays), with additional services during weekday peak periods. Trains usually use Platform 2.

Preceding station	National Rail	Following station
Terminus	ScotRail; Ayrshire Coast Line	Fairlie
	Ferry services	
Terminus	Caledonian MacBrayne; Ferry	Great Cumbrae
	Historical railways	
Terminus	Glasgow and South Western Railway; Largs Branch	Fairlie; Line and station open
