= Fairlie Pier railway station =

Former railway station in Scotland

Fairlie Pier

General information
- Location: Fairlie, Ayrshire; Scotland
- Coordinates: 55.7633°N 4.8592°W
- Grid reference: NS207559
- Platforms: 2

Other information
- Status: Disused

History
- Original company: G&SWR Largs Branch
- Post-grouping: LMS

Key dates
- 1 July 1882: Opened
- 1 October 1971: last train ran
- 31 July 1972: Closed
Location

Fairlie Pier railway station was a railway station serving the village of Fairlie, North Ayrshire, Scotland. The station allowed train passengers to link with ferry sailings to Great Cumbrae, Arran and the Isle of Bute.

== History ==
The station was opened on 1 July 1882 by the Glasgow and South Western Railway as part of the extension of the former Ardrossan Railway to Largs. As well as shipping services to Millport and Bute, the pier also handled services to and from Brodick during the winter months until the 1960s. The station officially closed on 31 July 1972, however the last train had run on 1 October 1971.

Today various sidings are situated around the station site as part of an MOD facility nearby, however they are overgrown and disused. Cumbrae services now run from a terminal in Largs.

Preceding station	Historical railways	Following station
Terminus	Glasgow and South Western Railway; Largs Branch	Fairlie; Line closed; station open
