= Grand Jury (Ireland) Act 1836 =

Act of the Parliament of the United Kingdom

Grand Jury (Ireland) Act 1836 (Note: The citation of this act by this short title was authorised by section 1 of, and the first schedule to, the Short Titles Act 1896. Due to the repeal of those provisions it is now authorised by section 19(2) of the Interpretation Act 1978.)
- Act of Parliament
- Parliament of the United Kingdom
- Long title: An Act to consolidate and amend the Laws relating to the Presentment of Public Money by Grand Juries in Ireland.
- Citation: 6 & 7 Will. 4. c. 116
- Territorial extent: Ireland (Note: Section 185.)

Dates
- Royal assent: 20 August 1836
- Commencement: 1 November 1836 (Note: Section 184.)
Other legislation
Repeals/revokes	Commons Act 1796
Amended by	Grand Jury (Ireland) Act 1837; Coroners (Ireland) Act 1846; Grand Jury Cess (Ireland) Act 1848; Summary Jurisdiction (Ireland) Act 1850; Grand Jury (Ireland) Act 1857; County Surveyors, &c. (Ireland) Act 1861; County Surveyors (Ireland) Act 1862; Vestry Cess Abolition (Ireland) Act 1864; Grand Jury (Ireland) Act 1873; Prison Officers Superannuation (Ireland) Act 1873; Statute Law Revision Act 1874; Public Works Loans (Ireland) Act 1877; General Prisons (Ireland) Act 1877; Statute Law Revision Act 1890; Statute Law Revision Act 1891; Grand Jury (Ireland) Act 1895; Statute Law Revision (Northern Ireland) Act 1980

Status: Amended

Text of statute as originally enacted

The Grand Jury (Ireland) Act 1836 (6 & 7 Will. 4. c. 116) is an act of the Parliament of the United Kingdom that consolidated enactments related to raising moneys by grand juries in Ireland.

The act gave cess-payers influence through presentment sessions .

== Provisions ==
Section 2 of the act the Commons Act 1796 (36 Geo. 3. c. 50 (I)) from 1 February 1837.

== Subsequent developments ==
So much of the act "as relates to the summary Jurisdiction of Justices as to any of the Offences upon or relating to public Roads herein-before mentioned" was repealed by section 60 of the Summary Jurisdiction (Ireland) Act 1850 (13 & 14 Vict. c. 102), which came into force on 1 October 1850.
