= County Dublin Grand Jury Act 1844 =

Act of the Parliament of the United Kingdom

County Dublin Grand Jury Act 1844 (Note: The citation of this act by this short title was authorised by section 1 of, and the first schedule to, the Short Titles Act 1896. Due to the repeal of those provisions it is now authorised by section 19(2) of the Interpretation Act 1978.)
- Act of Parliament
- Parliament of the United Kingdom
- Long title: An Act to consolidate and amend the Laws for the Regulation of Grand Jury Presentments in the County of Dublin.
- Citation: 7 & 8 Vict. c. 106
- Territorial extent: United Kingdom

Dates
- Royal assent: 9 August 1844
- Commencement: 1 January 1845 (Note: Section 157.)
Other legislation
Amends	See § Repealed enactments
Repeals/revokes	See § Repealed enactments
Amended by	Grand Jury (Dublin) Act 1845; Coroners (Ireland) Act 1846; Summary Jurisdiction (Ireland) Act 1850; County Surveyors (Ireland) Act 1862; Vestry Cess Abolition (Ireland) Act 1864; Statute Law Revision Act 1874 (No. 2); Statute Law Revision Act 1891; Statute Law Revision Act 1892; Statute Law Revision Act 1894

Status: Amended

Text of statute as originally enacted

The County Dublin Grand Jury Act 1844 (7 & 8 Vict. c. 106) is an act of the Parliament of the United Kingdom that consolidated enactments related to the presentment of grand juries in the County of Dublin.

== Provisions ==
=== Repealed enactments ===
Section 1 of the act repealed 4 enactments, listed in that section.

Citation	Short title	Description	Extent of repeal
26 Geo. 3. c. 30 (I)	Dublin to Malahide Road Act 1786	An Act passed in the Parliament of Ireland in the Twenty-sixth Year of the Reign of His late Majesty King George the Third, intituled An Act for making, widening, and repairing public Roads in the County of Dublin, and for repealing Parts of several Acts formerly made for that Purpose.	Except such Parts thereof as authorize the Grand Jury to accept from and the late Sir Nicholas Lawless to make a Conveyance of so much of Gallows Hill as might be deemed sufficient for erecting a County Gaol, and provide that the Person or Persons to whom such Conveyance should be made should in nowise be reputed to derive or claim as a Freeholder or Free- holders, and as empower the Grand Jury to levy andpayto the said Sir Nicholas Lawless, his Heirs andAssigns, the annual Rent therein mentioned
43 Geo. 3. c. xxv	Dublin County Roads Act 1803	An Act passed in the Forty-third Year of the Reign of His late MajestyKing George the Third, intituled An Act to alter and amend the aforesaid Act made in the Twenty-sixth Year of His said Majesty's Reign.	The whole act.
50 Geo. 3. c. lx	Rathdown Roads Act 1810	An Act passed in the Fiftieth Year of the Reign of His late Majesty King George the Third, intituled An Act to amend so much of an Act made in the Parliament of Ireland in the Twenty-sixth Year of King George the Third, for making and repairing public Roads in the County of Dublin, as relates to the Roads within the Barony of Rathdown.	The whole act.
51 Geo. 3. c. xxxvi	Dublin Roads Act 1811	An Act passed in the Fifty-first Year of the Reign of King George the Third, intituled An Act to amend an Act ade in the Parliament of Ireland in the Twenty-sixth Year of King George the Third, for making and repairing public Roads in the County of Dublin	With respect to those Roads within those Parts of the Baronies of Uppercross and Newcastle which are situate on the South-east Side of the great Turnpike Road leading from Dublin to Cork by Rathcoole and Naas.

== Subsequent developments ==
So much of the act "as relates to the summary Jurisdiction of Justices as to any of the Offences upon or relating to public Roads herein-before mentioned" was repealed by section 60 of the Summary Jurisdiction (Ireland) Act 1850 (13 & 14 Vict. c. 102), which came into force on 1 October 1850.
