= Petty Sessions (Ireland) Act 1851 =

Act of the Parliament of the United Kingdom

Petty Sessions (Ireland) Act 1851 (Note: Section 45.)
- Act of Parliament
- Parliament of the United Kingdom
- Long title: An Act to consolidate and amend the Acts regulating the Proceedings at Petty Sessions, and the Duties of Justices of the Peace out of Quarter Sessions, in Ireland.
- Citation: 14 & 15 Vict. c. 93
- Territorial extent: Ireland (Note: Section 47.)

Dates
- Royal assent: 7 August 1851
- Commencement: 1 November 1851 (Note: Section 46. Sections 1 and 2 of the act commenced on 7 August 1851, the date of the act's passing.)
Other legislation
Amends	See § Repealed enactments
Repeals/revokes	See § Repealed enactments
Amended by	Petty Sessions, Ireland, Amendment Act 1861; Petty Sessions (Ireland) Amendment Act 1863; Petty Sessions (Ireland) Act 1867; Petty Sessions (Ireland) Act 1882; Summary Jurisdiction (Ireland) Act 1918

Status: Amended

Text of statute as originally enacted

The Petty Sessions (Ireland) Act 1851 (14 & 15 Vict. c. 93) is an act of the Parliament of the United Kingdom that consolidated enactments related to proceedings at petty sessions and the duties of justices of the peace out of quarter sessions in Ireland.

== Provisions ==
=== Repealed enactments ===
Section 43 of the act repealed 4 enactments, listed in that section, together with all other acts and parts of acts inconsistent with its provisions.

Citation	Short title	Description	Extent of repeal
7 & 8 Geo. 4. c. 67	Petty Sessions (Ireland) Act 1827	An Act for the better Administration of Justice at the holding of Petty Sessions by Justices of the Peace in Ireland.	So far as relates to any Proceeding by Justices in or out of Petty Sessions.
6 & 7 Will. 4. c. 34	Officers of Clerks of the Crown and Clerks of the Peace (Ireland) Act 1836	An Act to amend an Act passed in the Seventh and Eighth Years of the Reign of His Majesty King George the Fourth, for the better Administration of Justice at the holding of Petty Sessions by Justices of the Peace in Ireland.	So far as relates to any Proceedings by Justices in or out of Petty Sessions.
12 & 13 Vict. c. 69	Indictable Offences (Ireland) Act 1849	An Act to facilitate the Performance of the Duties of Justices of the Peace out of Quarter Sessions in Ireland, with respect to Persons charged with Indictable Offences.	The whole act. (Note: Due to the limited territorial extent of the 1851 act to Ireland, this act was repealed again by section 1 of, and the schedule to, the Statute Law Revision Act 1861 (24 & 25 Vict. c. 101).)
12 & 13 Vict. c. 70	Summary Convictions (Ireland) Act 1849	An Act to facilitate the Performance of the Duties of Justices of the Peace out of Quarter Sessions in Ireland, with respect to Summary Convictions and Orders.	The whole act.

== Subsequent developments ==
Following the partition of Ireland in 1922, the act has continued in force in both Northern Ireland and the Republic of Ireland, where it has been subject to further amendment by the legislatures of each jurisdiction.
