= Recovery of Wages (Ireland) Act 1814 =

Act of the Parliament of the United Kingdom

- Act of Parliament
- Parliament of the United Kingdom
- Long title: An Act to repeal the several laws for Recovery of small Sums due for Wages in Ireland, and to make other Provisions for Recovery of such Wages.
- Citation: 54 Geo. 3. c. 116
- Territorial extent: United Kingdom

Dates
- Royal assent: 23 July 1814
- Commencement: 23 August 1814 (Note: Section 1.)
- Repealed: 1 October 1850
Other legislation
Amends	See § Repealed enactments
Repeals/revokes	See § Repealed enactments
Repealed by	Summary Jurisdiction (Ireland) Act 1850

Status: Repealed

Text of statute as originally enacted

The Recovery of Wages (Ireland) Act 1814 (54 Geo. 3. c. 116) was an act of the Parliament of the United Kingdom.

== Provisions ==
=== Repealed enactments ===
Section 1 of the act repealed 5 enactments, listed in that section.

Citation	Short title	Description	Extent of repeal
2 Geo. 1. c. 17 (I)	Servants Act 1715	An Act passed in the Parliament of Ireland in the Second Year of the Reign of His late Majesty King George the first, intituled An Atto empower Justices of the Peace to determine Disputes about Servants, Artificers, Day Labourers, Wages and other small Demands, and to oblige Masters to pay the same; and to punish idle and disorderly Servants.	As relates to the Payment of Wages due to Servants, Artificers and Labourers.
3 Geo. 2. c. 14 (I)	Workmen's Combinations, Wages, and Bricks Act 1729	An Act passed in the Third Year of His late Majesty King George the Second, intituled An Act to prevent unlawful Combinations of Workmen, Artificers and Labourers employed in the several Trades and Manufactures of this Kingdom; and for the better Payment of their Wages; as also to prevent Abuses in making of Bricks, and to ascertain their Dimensions.	As relates to the Payment of Wages due to Servants, Artificers and Labourers.
25 Geo. 2. c. 8 (I)	Apprentices Act 1751	An Act passed in the Twenty fifth Year of His said Majesty King George the Second, intituled An Act for the better adjusting and more easy Recovery of the Wages of certain Servants, and for the better Regulation of such Servants, and of certain Apprentices; and for the Punishment of all such Owners of Coal and their Agents, as shall knowingly employ and set at Work Persons retained in the Service of other Coal Owners; and also that mutual Debts between Party and Party be set one against the other.	As relates to the Payment of Wages due to Servants, Artificers and Labourers.
29 Geo. 2. c. 8 (I)	Apprentices Act 1755	An Act passed in the Twenty ninth Year of His said Majesty King George the Second, intituled An Act for continuing and reviving several temporary Statutes; and for amending and explaining an Act made in the Eighth Year of His late Majesty's Reign, continued and amended by an Act made in the Twenty first Year of His present Majesty's Reign, intituled An Act for the further Amendment of the Law in relation to Butter and Tallow, Casks, Hides and other Commodities of this Kingdom; and for preventing the Destruction of Salmon.	As relates to the Payment of Wages due to Servants, Artificers and Labourers.
5 Geo. 3. c. 15 (I)	Temporary Statutes and Kilkenny Treasurer Act 1765	An Act passed in the Fifth Year of His preſent Majesty's Reign, intituled An Act for continuing, reviving and amending several temporary Statutes; and for empowering the Grand Jury of the County of Kilkenny at the Assises to increase the yearly Salary of the Treasurer of the said County.	As relates to the Payment of Wages due to Servants, Artificers and Labourers.

== Subsequent developments ==
The whole act was repealed by section 60 of the Summary Jurisdiction (Ireland) Act 1850 (13 & 14 Vict. c. 102), which came into force on 1 October 1850.
