= Largs Branch =

Railway line in the UK

The Largs Branch is a railway line in Scotland, serving communities on the north Ayrshire Coast, as well as the deep water ocean terminal at Hunterston. It branches from the Glasgow to Ayr line at Kilwinning.

The first part was formed when the Ardrossan Railway was built, with the principal objective of facilitating coastwise export of minerals and import of goods to Glasgow, but it was only partly successful. The later Glasgow and South Western Railway extended the line to serve Largs, opening the line throughout in 1885.

There is a half-hourly electric passenger train service a far as Ardrossan, and generally hourly from there to Largs. Heavy mineral trains use the route from Hunterston deep water terminal.

== History ==
=== Horse drawn trains ===
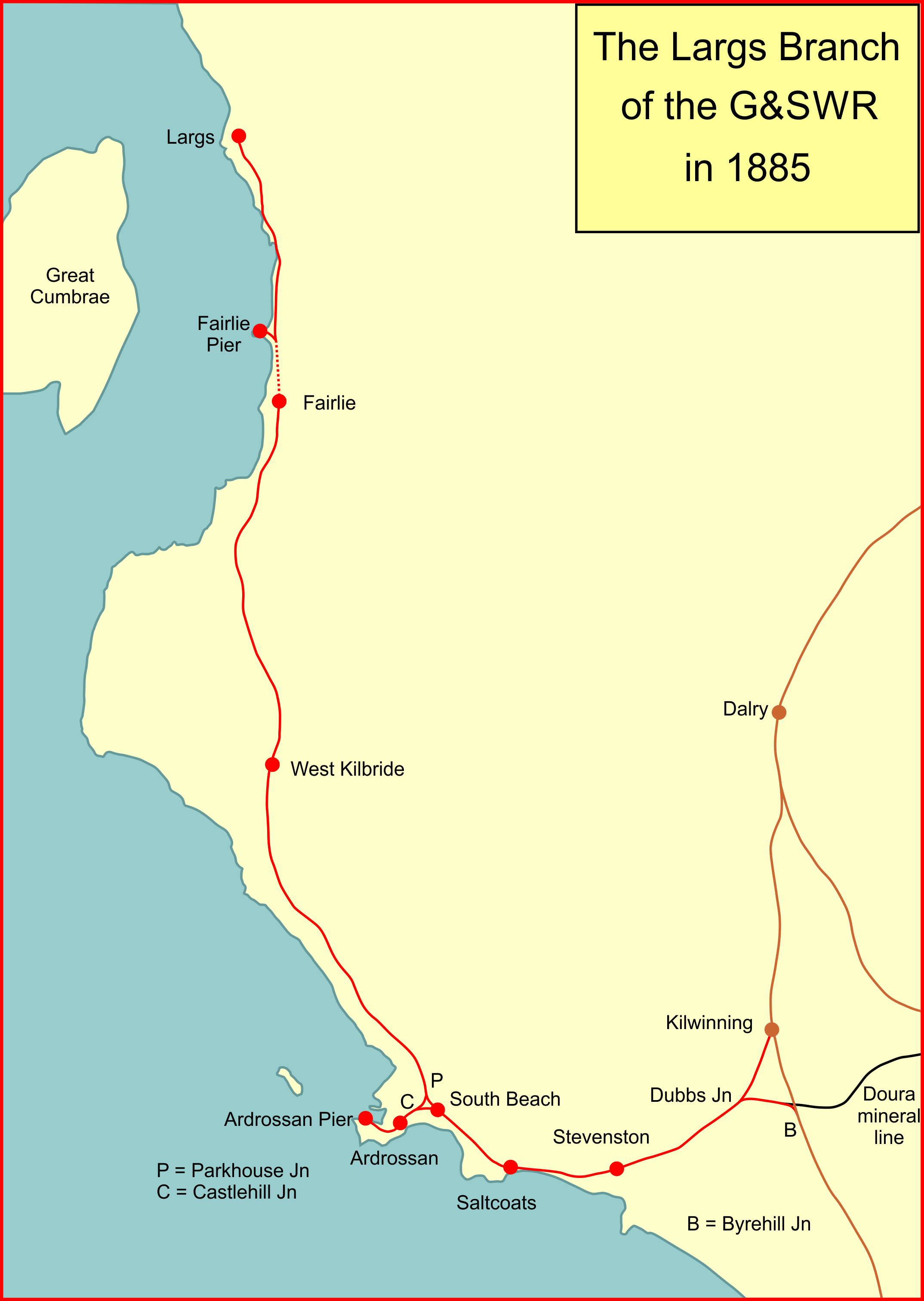
System diagram of the Largs branch

The twelfth Earl of Eglinton developed Ardrossan Harbour in the early years of the nineteenth century, intending it to be useful for the transport of minerals from Ayrshire by coastal shipping, and as an inwards port to serve Glasgow. He tried to build the Glasgow, Paisley and Ardrossan Canal, authorised by the Glasgow, Paisley and Ardrossan Canal Act 1806 (46 Geo. 3. c. lxxv), but the scheme ran out of money and only reached Johnstone, becoming the Glasgow, Paisley and Johnstone Canal.

He next obtained authorisation in the Glasgow, Paisley and Ardrossan Canal and Railway Act 1827 (7 & 8 Geo. 4. c. lxxxvii) for the Ardrossan and Johnstone Railway, intending to link his truncated canal by a railway. This too failed to reach its full extent, and was only constructed between Ardrossan and Kilwinning, with an eastward mineral branch to Perceton and Doura collieries, which he controlled. The line was horse-operated and the track consisted of cast iron fishbelly rails on stone blocks; the track gauge was 4 ft 6 in (1,372 mm). It opened in 1831, and passengers as well as minerals were carried, at least between Ardrossan and Kilwinning, and it was called the Ardrossan Railway.

Within a short time, promoters began raising support for a railway between Glasgow and Ayr, and Glasgow and Kilmarnock. This scheme became the Glasgow, Paisley, Kilmarnock and Ayr Railway (GPK&AR); it was authorised by an act of Parliament, the Glasgow, Paisley, Kilmarnock and Ayr Railway Act 1837 (7 Will. 4 & 1 Vict. c. cxvii), and opened in stages between 1839 and 1840. It was a locomotive railway on the standard gauge, and it intersected the Ardrossan Railway at Kilwinning.

By now the antiquated technology of the Ardrossan Railway was obviously a problem, and in 1840 the line was altered to standard gauge and the track modernised for locomotive operation. The railway had not so far been separated financially from the canal company, and the opportunity was now taken to do this; additional capital was raised for the upgrading works by the Ardrossan and Johnston Railway Act 1840 (3 & 4 Vict. c. civ) of 23 July 1840.

Glasgow, Kilmarnock and Ardrossan Railway Act 1846
- Act of Parliament
- Parliament of the United Kingdom
- Long title: An Act for making a Railway from the Glasgow, Barrhead, and Neilston Direct Railway to the Town of Kilmarnock, with certain Branches therefrom, to be called "The Glasgow, Kilmarnock, and Ardrossan Railway," and to purchase the Ardrossan Railway and Harbour.
- Citation: 9 & 10 Vict. c. clix

Dates
- Royal assent: 16 July 1846

Glasgow, Kilmarnock and Ardrossan Railway (Amendment, Deviations and Branches) Act 1847
- Act of Parliament
- Parliament of the United Kingdom
- Long title: An Act to enable the Glasgow, Kilmarnock, and Ardrossan Railway Company to make certain Branch Railways, and to make certain Deviations from the Line and Levels of the said Railway; and to amend the Act relating to the said Railway.
- Citation: 10 & 11 Vict. c. cxix

Dates
- Royal assent: 2 July 1847

Text of statute as originally enacted

Glasgow, Kilmarnock and Ardrossan Railway Amendment Act 1849
- Act of Parliament
- Parliament of the United Kingdom
- Long title: An Act to amend and enlarge the Powers and Provisions of the Acts relating to the Ardrossan Harbour and to the Glasgow, Kilmarnock, and Ardrossan Railway.
- Citation: 12 & 13 Vict. c. lxxxviii

Dates
- Royal assent: 1 August 1849

Text of statute as originally enacted

Glasgow, Kilmarnock and Ardrossan Railway Dissolution Act 1852
- Act of Parliament
- Parliament of the United Kingdom
- Long title: An Act for the Dissolution of the Glasgow, Kilmarnock, and Ardrossan Railway Company, and the Abandonment of their Undertaking; and for other Purposes.
- Citation: 15 & 16 Vict. c. lxxviii

Dates
- Royal assent: 17 June 1852

Text of statute as originally enacted

The GPK&AR had clear intentions at this stage of forming part of a through route between Glasgow and London, although achieving that was still far off. A rival railway, the Caledonian Railway (CR) now came on the scene with its own plans to reach Carlisle and forming part of the route to London. The CR also considered competing with the GPK&AR in Ayrshire, and the two companies became deadly rivals; the Ardrossan Railway was physically connected to the GPK&AR, but if the CR could build a line to reach it, it would have a secure foothold deep in GPK&AR territory. The Ardrossan company bought shares in the Glasgow, Barrhead and Neilston Direct Railway, and the Caledonian Railway bought shares in the Ardrossan Railway, and the Glasgow, Kilmarnock and Ardrossan Railway Act 1846 (9 & 10 Vict. c. clix) was obtained for the Glasgow, Kilmarnock and Ardrossan Railway, with £750,000 of authorised capital, connecting the two. But by now the financial bubble, in which all manner of railway schemes were being proposed, had burst, and there was no money for building railways. Moreover, a proposed merger of the Ardrossan with the Caledonian was rejected by the former's shareholders in 1847. The Glasgow, Kilmarnock and Ardrossan Railway Company was finally dissolved by the Glasgow, Kilmarnock and Ardrossan Railway Dissolution Act 1852 (15 & 16 Vict. c. lxxviii).

=== The Glasgow and South Western Railway ===
The GPK&AR too found its financial resources strained, and an independent ally, the Glasgow, Dumfries and Carlisle Railway took a share of building the line to Carlisle. The two companies completed the task on 28 October 1850 and on that day they merged by the earlier Glasgow and South Western Railway Incorporation Act 1847 (10 & 11 Vict. c. clxxxiii), forming the Glasgow and South Western Railway (G&SWR). At this time the Ardrossan Railway was operating as a locomotive line; there were four passenger trains each way between Kilwinning and Ardrossan, with stops at Stevenston and Saltcoats stations.

Finding that the Ardrossan Railway, deep in G&SWR territory, was now friendless and penniless, the G&SWR made arrangements to purchase it. This proved a lengthy process, but it was effected on 1 August 1854.

=== Extending to Largs ===
The people of Largs had been hoping for a railway connection since the mid-1850s. In 1864 the G&SWR started to plan a line from Dalry to Largs; the Caledonian Railway too was planning a connection, from Wemyss Bay. Opposition was immediately experienced from wealthy residents of Fairlie and elsewhere, who saw the incursion of a railway as detrimental. Another attempt was made by the G&SWR in 1871, also with a frustrating outcome. However, in 1873 a line from Ardrossan (instead of Dalry) to West Kilbride was approved. That section opened to goods trains in March 1878, and passenger trains started operating on 1 May 1878. It made a triangular junction with the existing line at Ardrossan.

The hostility to a railway further north had waned, and the G&SWR was able to open an extension from West Kilbride to Fairlie on 1 June 1880. Onward construction was blocked for the time being by hilly terrain. However, there was a pier used by Clyde steamers, and extension to Fairlie Pier, involving a tunnel section, was opened on 1 July 1882. The station roof was built using materials recovered from the temporary Dunlop Street station in Glasgow. Six passenger trains ran each way daily from St Enoch station in Glasgow to Fairlie Pier.

The extension from Fairlie Pier Junction to Largs was over flatter terrain, but there was a long section at the shore line requiring a sea wall. It opened on 1 June 1885. Ten trains ran to and from Glasgow daily.

=== Competition on the Firth of Clyde ===
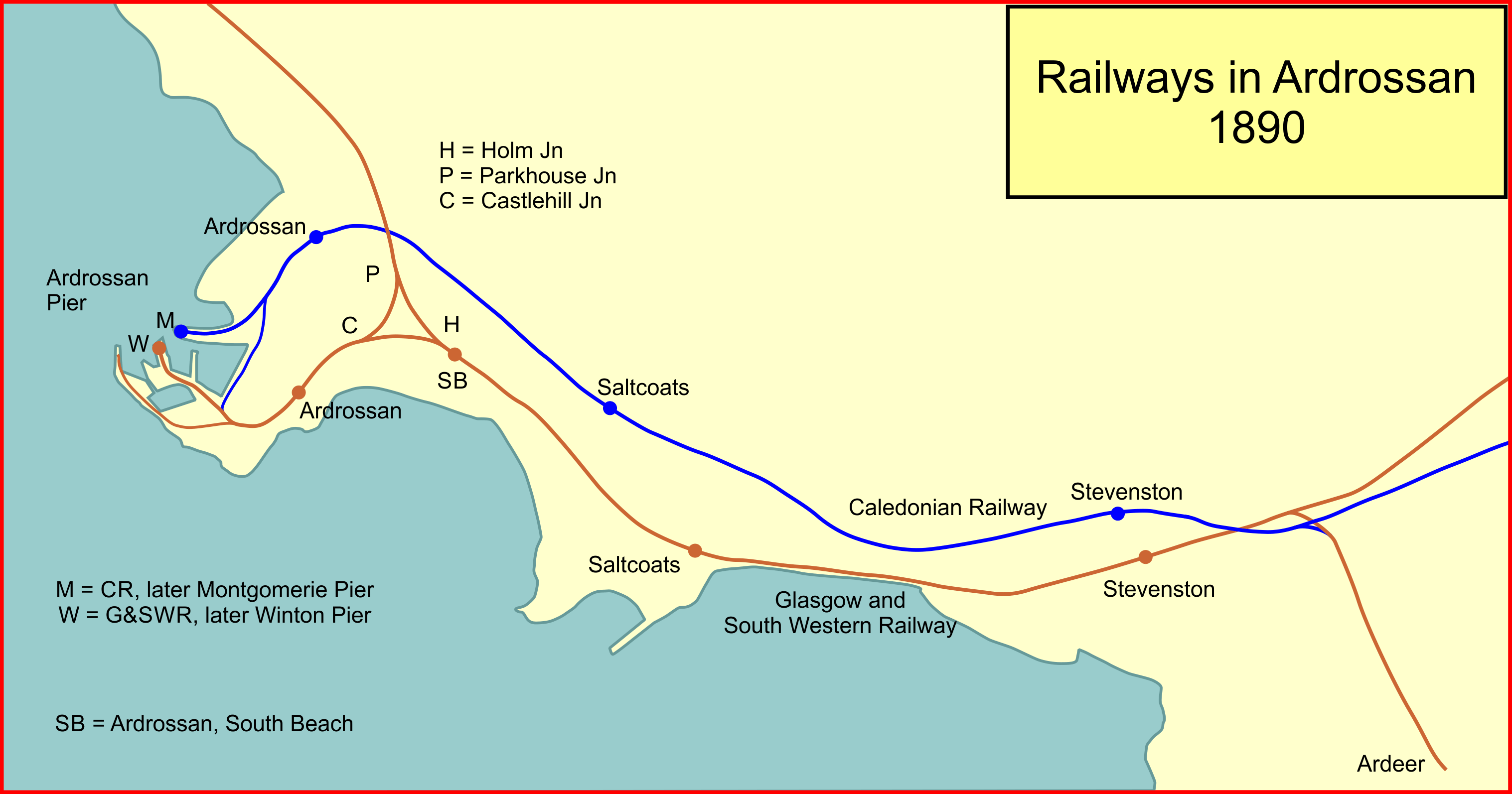
Ardrossan lines in 1890, after the arrival of the Caledonian Railway

Some of the early rationale in building the line had been to pre-empt incursion into the area by the rival Caledonian Railway. On 4 September 1888 the Lanarkshire and Ayrshire Railway (L&AR), worked by the Caledonian Railway, opened its line to Ardrossan. At first it used a temporary connection to the G&SWR line there, as its own pier facility was not ready; but on 30 May 1890 it was fully operational, at Montgomerie Pier.

There were then two railway-connected piers in Ardrossan, and the Firth of Clyde steamer services were in competition. The Caledonian Railway and it subsidiary the Caledonian Steam Packet Company were successful in abstracting 75% of the G&SWR trade. Some remarkable accelerations in throughout (rail and steamer) journey times were advertised by both companies, and the G&SWR further responded by planning a shortening of its route to Fairlie to improve passenger journey times, by building a new line from Dalry, but an 1890 parliamentary bill was thrown out.

By contrast, Ardrossan Harbour was heavily involved in handling bulk cargo, and the harbour was considerably extended in this period, the new facility opening on 12 April 1891.

The G&SWR obtained an act of Parliament, the Glasgow and South Western Railway (Steam Vessels) Act 1891 (54 & 55 Vict. c. cxcvii), giving approval to own and operate its own steamers; previously services had been run in conjunction with independent operators.

A second attempt to get approval for a Dalry-to-Fairlie line was rejected in 1892, and for a few years attention was elsewhere. In 1897 the Caledonian Railway re-opened the issue by purchasing Largs Pier. The G&SWR Largs station was in the centre of the town, not close to the pier, and its railway route from Glasgow was very indirect. The implication was that there would be a revived proposal for the CR to build a shorter line to Largs, and the G&SWR responded with a proposed line from Kilmacolm to Largs via Inverkip, proposed in 1899. The company secured authorisation purchase Largs Harbour, but the new railway was never built.

Competition remained fierce, but by 1910 it became possible to agree a traffic sharing arrangement; the Arran ferry service would be operated by one company at a time, in alternate years; this was agreed in March 1910 between the G&SWR and the Caledonian Steam Packet Company.

== Chronology ==
The Ardrossan Railway was opened from Kilwinning to Ardrossan (as well as the Doura colliery branches) as a horse drawn goods line in 1834; passenger operation probably commenced in 1834. It was closed for regauging and upgrading, and re-opened on 17 August 1840.

A southward connection was made before 1856 from the Doura branch at Byrehill Junction towards Ayr at Dubbs Junction. An extensive iron works was established in the north-east quadrant of the Ayr and Doura lines where they crossed, rail served from both lines.

It was extended by the G&SWR from Ardrossan (Holm Junction) to West Kilbride in March 1878 for goods trains, and on 1 May 1878 for passengers. It made a triangular junction with the existing line at Ardrossan; the apex nearer the Pier was Castlehill Junction and that nearer West Kilbride was Parkhouse Junction. Passenger trains ran to Ardrossan and reversed there to continue to West Kilbride until South Beach station was opened in 1883.

The G&SWR further extended the line from West Kilbride to Fairlie on 1 June 1880, and from there to Fairlie Pier on 1 July 1882; finally the line was extended to Largs on 1 June 1885.

When the L&AR line was opened, at first it used the G&SWR Ardrossan Pier by running to "Ardrossan" (town) station, (Note: For many years the stations at Ardrossan were not separately identified.) reversing there.

The Doura branch was closed some time between 1938 and 1956.

== Topography ==
Locations in italic were not passenger stations. Stations in bold are open at the present day.

Kilwinning to Largs.

- **Kilwinning**; station on the Ayr main line;
- Dubbs Junction; junction from Ayr via Byrehill Junction;
- Ardeer; ironworks; later chemical works of Nobel Enterprises;
- **Stevenston**; the L&AR station was named Stevenston Moor Park;
- **Saltcoats**; the station was relocated to the west on 1 July 1858, and to a location between the two earlier sites in 1882; renamed Saltcoats Central from 1952 to 1965; the L&AR station was named Saltcoats North;
- **Ardrossan, South Beach**; opened 1 January 1883;
- Holm Junction; for Ardrossan Pier line;
- Parkhouse Junction; from Pier line;
- **West Kilbride**;
- **Fairlie**; renamed Fairlie Town 1953; then Fairlie High 1953; then Fairlie 1953;
- Fairlie Pier Junction;
- **Largs**.

Byrehill Junction to Dubbs Junction.

- Byrehill Junction; on line from Ayr;
- Blacklands Junction; from the Doura line;
- Longford Chemical Works; closed 1950s;
- Dubbs Junction; see above.

Ardrossan, Holm Junction, to Ardrossan Pier.

The line was shortened back at Ardrossan Pier on 15 June 1987.

- Holm Junction; see above;
- Castlehill Junction; from Parkhouse Junction;
- Ardrossan; renamed **Ardrossan Town** 1953; closed 1 January 1968; re-opened 19 January 1987;
- **Ardrossan Harbour**; opened 15 June 1987 (as relocation of Winton Pier);
- Ardrossan Pier; Winton Pier from 1909; closed 15 June 1987.

Ardrossan, Parkhouse Junction to Castlehill Junction.

Closed 30 September 1969.

- Parkhouse Junction; see above;
- Castlehill Junction; see above.

Fairlie Pier Branch.

Line closed to passengers 1 October 1971; part of the line is still in place to allow access to a Ministry of Defence facility in the area. It is referred to as Admiralty Siding but was shown as temporarily out of use as of 2014.

- Pier Junction;
- Fairlie Pier; closed 1 October 1971.

Note: the L&AR station at Ardrossan Harbour was called Ardrossan Pier at first, and then Montgomerie Pier from 1921. It was not used for passenger purposes during World War II. In 1947 a connection was made east of Stevenston enabling through running from Montgomerie Pier to the G&SWR line, and the L&AR line east of that point was closed then.

== Electrification ==
The line was electrified and resignalled in 1986 as part the AyrLine electrification programme. Electric working commenced between Kilwinning and Ardrossan in November 1986, and was extended to Largs in January 1987. The passenger route from a point immediately south of Ardrossan South Beach to Largs was reduced to single track. The former Up Line was retained as a non-electrified "Up Freight Line", serving the facilities at the Hunterston Terminal, which are on both sides of the main line.

== The present day ==
Passenger trains on the route are operated by ScotRail. There is typically an hourly service from Glasgow to Largs and an hourly service from Glasgow to Ardrossan Harbour, phased to give a 30-minute interval service between Kilwinning and South Beach.

The deep water terminal at Hunterston provides a considerable volume of heavy mineral traffic on the line, some of which uses the Byrehill Junction spur to reverse at Barassie en route to English destinations.

== Notes ==
=== Sources ===
- Awdry, Christopher (1990). Encyclopaedia of British Railway Companies. Sparkford: Patrick Stephens Ltd. ISBN 1-8526-0049-7. OCLC 19514063. CN 8983.
- Butt, R. V. J. (October 1995). The Directory of Railway Stations: details every public and private passenger station, halt, platform and stopping place, past and present (1st ed.). Sparkford: Patrick Stephens Ltd. ISBN 978-1-85260-508-7. OCLC 60251199. OL 11956311M.
- Jowett, Alan (March 1989). Jowett's Railway Atlas of Great Britain and Ireland: From Pre-Grouping to the Present Day (1st ed.). Sparkford: Patrick Stephens Ltd. ISBN 978-1-85260-086-0. OCLC 22311137.
- Railscot on Largs Branch
