= Juries Act =

Stock short title used for UK legislation

Juries Act (with its variations) is a stock short title used for legislation in the United Kingdom relating to juries.

== List ==
- The Juries (Ireland) Act 1833 (3 & 4 Will. 4. c. 91)
- The Juries (Ireland) Act 1834 (4 & 5 Will. 4. c. 8)
- The Juries (Ireland) Act 1839 (2 & 3 Vict. c. 48)
- The Juries Act 1871 (34 & 35 Vict. c. 2)
- The Juries Act (Ireland) 1873 (36 & 37 Vict. c. 27)
- The Juries Act 1974

The Juries Acts 1825 to 1870 was the collective title of the following acts:

- The Juries Act 1825 (6 Geo. 4. c. 50)
- The Juries Act 1862 (25 & 26 Vict. c. 107)
- The Juries Act 1870 (33 & 34 Vict. c. 77)

The Juries (Scotland) Acts 1745 to 1869 is the collective title of the following acts:

- The Jurors (Scotland) Act 1745 (19 Geo. 2. c. 9)
- The Jurors (Scotland) Act 1825 (6 Geo. 4. c. 22)
- The Jurors (Scotland) Act 1826 (7 Geo. 4. c. 8)
- The Juries (Lighthouse Keepers Exemption) Act 1869 (32 & 33 Vict. c. 36)

The Juries (Ireland) Acts 1871 to 1894 is the collective title of the following acts:

- The Juries Act (Ireland) 1871 (34 & 35 Vict. c. 65)
- The Juries (Ireland) Act 1872 (35 & 36 Vict. c. 25)
- The Jurors Qualification (Ireland) Act 1876 (39 & 40 Vict. c. 21)
- The Juries Procedure (Ireland) Act 1876 (39 & 40 Vict. c. 78)
- The Jurors (Ireland) Act 1894 (57 & 58 Vict. c. 49)

The Grand Juries (Ireland) Acts 1816 to 1895 is the collective title of the following acts:

- The Grand Juries (Ireland) Act 1816 (56 Geo. 3. c. 87)
- The Grand Jury (Ireland) Act 1833 (3 & 4 Will. 4. c. 78)
- The Grand Jury (Ireland) Act 1836 (6 & 7 Will. 4. c. 116)
- The Grand Jury (Ireland) Act 1837 (7 Will. 4 & 1 Vict. c. 2)
- The Grand Jury (Ireland) Act 1838 (1 & 2 Vict. c. 37)
- The Grand Jury (Ireland) Act 1843 (6 & 7 Vict. c. 32)
- The County Dublin Grand Jury Act 1844 (7 & 8 Vict. c. 106)
- The Grand Jury (Dublin) Act 1845 (8 & 9 Vict. c. 81)
- The Grand Jury (Ireland) Act 1853 (16 & 17 Vict. c. 136)
- The Grand Jury (Ireland) Act 1856 (19 & 20 Vict. c. 63)
- The Grand Juries (Ireland) Act 1857 (20 & 21 Vict. c. 15)
- The Grand Juries (Ireland) Act 1872 (35 & 36 Vict. c. 42)
- The Grand Juries (Ireland) Act 1873 (36 & 37 Vict. c. 34)
- The Queen's Bench (Ireland) Grand Juries Act 1873 (36 & 37 Vict. c. 65)
- The Grand Jury (Ireland) Act 1895 (58 & 59 Vict. c. 8)

== See also ==
- List of short titles
