= Juries (Ireland) Act 1833 =

Act of the Parliament of the United Kingdom

- Act of Parliament
- Parliament of the United Kingdom
- Long title: An Act for consolidating and amending the Laws relative to Jurors and Juries in Ireland.
- Citation: 3 & 4 Will. 4. c. 91
- Introduced by: William Plunket, 1st Baron Plunket (Lords)
- Territorial extent: United Kingdom

Dates
- Royal assent: 28 August 1833
- Commencement: 1 January 1834 (Note: Section 49)
- Repealed: 24 December 1888
Other legislation
Amends	See § Repealed enactments
Repeals/revokes	See § Repealed enactments
Amended by	Juries (Ireland) Act 1834; Juries (Ireland) Act 1839; Naturalization Act 1870; Statute Law Revision Act 1874; Juries Act (Ireland) 1871
Repealed by	Statute Law Revision (No. 2) Act 1888
Relates to	Juries Act 1825

Status: Repealed

History of passage through Parliament

Records of Parliamentary debate relating to the statute from Hansard

Text of statute as originally enacted

The Juries (Ireland) Act 1833 (3 & 4 Will. 4. c. 91) was an act of the Parliament of the United Kingdom that consolidated and amended statutes for Ireland related to juries. The act abolished outdated penalties, moved responsibility for creating jury lists from petty constables to churchwardens and parish overseers, expanded jury qualification to include bankers and merchants and devise a new method of jury selection. The act repealed for Ireland statutes from 1259 to 1825.

The act included repeals mirroring for Ireland the Juries Act 1825 (6 Geo. 4 c. 50), including repealing acts of the Parliament of England extended to Ireland by Poynings' Act 1495.

== Background ==
In the United Kingdom, acts of Parliament remain in force until expressly repealed. Blackstone's Commentaries on the Laws of England, published in the late 18th century, raised questions about the system and structure of the common law and the poor drafting and disorder of the existing statute book.

In 1806 the Commission on Public Records passed a resolution requesting the production of a report on the best mode of reducing the volume of the statute book. From 1810 to 1825, The Statutes of the Realm was published, providing for the first time the authoritative collection of acts.

By the early 19th century, English criminal law had become increasingly intricate and difficult to navigate due to the large number of acts passed that had accumulated over many years. This complexity posed challenges for law enforcement.

In 1825, the Juries Act 1825 (6 Geo. 4. c. 50) was passed, which consolidated for England and Wales enactments related to juries and repealed over 65 statutes.

In 1827, Peel's Acts were passed to modernise, consolidate and repeal provisions of the criminal law, territorially limited to England and Wales and Scotland, including:

- Criminal Statutes Repeal Act 1827 (7 & 8 Geo. 4. c. 27), which repealed for England and Wales over 140 enactments relating to the criminal law.
- Criminal Law Act 1827 (7 & 8 Geo. 4. c. 28), which modernised the administration of criminal justice.
- Larceny Act 1827 (7 & 8 Geo. 4. c. 29), which consolidated provisions in the law relating to larceny.
- Malicious Injuries to Property Act 1827 (7 & 8 Geo. 4. c. 30), which consolidated provisions in the law relating to malicious injuries to property.

In 1828, parallel bills for Ireland to Peel's Acts were introduced, becoming:

- Criminal Statutes (Ireland) Repeal Act 1828 (9 Geo. 4. 54), which repealed for Ireland over 140 enactments relating to the criminal law.
- Criminal Law (Ireland) Act 1828 (9 Geo. 4. 54), which modernised the administration of criminal justice.
- Larceny (Ireland) Act 1828 (9 Geo. 4. c. 55) which consolidated provisions in the law relating to larceny.
- Malicious Injuries to Property (Ireland) Act 1828 (9 Geo. 4. c. 56), which consolidated provisions in the law relating to malicious injuries to property.

In 1828, the Offences Against the Person Act 1828 (9 Geo. 4. c. 31) was passed, which consolidated provisions in the law relating to offences against the person and repealed for England and Wales almost 60 related enactments. In 1829, the Offences Against the Person (Ireland) Act 1829 (10 Geo. 4. c. 34) was passed, which consolidated provisions in the law relating to offences against the person and repealed for Ireland almost 60 enactments relating to the criminal law.

In 1828, the Criminal Law (India) Act 1828 (9 Geo. 4. c. 74) was passed, which repealed for India offences repealed by the Criminal Statutes Repeal Act 1827 (7 & 8 Geo. 4. c. 27) and the Offences Against the Person Act 1828 (9 Geo. 4. c. 31).

== Passage ==
The Juries (Ireland) Bill had its first reading in the House of Lords on 21 March 1833, presented by the Lord Chancellor of Ireland, William Plunket, 1st Baron Plunket. The bill had its second reading in the House of Lords on 2 April 1833, introduced by Lord Plunket, and was committed to a Committee of the Whole House. During debate, the bill was opposed by George Evans, 1st Baron Carbery, who argued it would allow illiterate and non-English speaking jurors to serve, the William Howard, 4th Earl of Wicklow, who claimed Ireland's existing jury system was working well, William Best, 1st Baron Wynford, who contended it was inconsistent with the recently passed Coercive Bill, Robert Jocelyn, 3rd Earl of Roden, who cited opposition from Irish judges and other peers, who argued it was inappropriate to align Irish and English jury systems before addressing broader societal differences. In support of the bill, Ulick de Burgh, 1st Marquess of Clanricarde, argued it would increase Irish confidence in legal institutions and William Plunket, 1st Baron Plunket emphasised it was based on Sir Robert Peel's earlier reforms, not Daniel O'Connell's influence.

The committee met on 3 April 1833 and reported on 4 April 1833, with amendments. The third reading of the amended bill was delayed several times, and the amended bill had its third reading in the House of Lords on 29 April 1833 and passed, with amendments.

The amended bill had its first reading in the House of Commons on 4 May 1833. After a number of deferrals, the bill had its second reading in the House of Commons on 20 August 1833 and was committed to a Committee of the Whole House, which met on 21 August 1833 and reported on 22 August 1833, with amendments. The amended bill had its third reading in the House of Commons on 23 August and passed, without amendments.

The amended bill was considered and agreed to by the House of Lords on 26 August 1833

The bill was granted royal assent on 28 August 1833.

== Subsequent developments ==
Juries (Ireland) Act 1834
- Act of Parliament
- Parliament of the United Kingdom
- Long title: An Act to amend an Act passed in the last Session, for consolidating and amending the Laws relative to Jurors and Juries in Ireland.
- Citation: 4 & 5 Will. 4. c. 8
- Introduced by: Edward Littleton MP (Commons)
- Territorial extent: Ireland (Note: Long title.)

Dates
- Royal assent: 26 March 1834
- Commencement: 26 March 1834 (Note: The Acts of Parliament (Commencement) Act 1793.)
- Repealed: 14 August 1871
Other legislation
Amends	Juries (Ireland) Act 1833
Amended by	Juries (Ireland) Act 1839
Repealed by	Juries Act (Ireland) 1871
Relates to	Juries Act 1825

Status: Repealed

History of passage through Parliament

Records of Parliamentary debate relating to the statute from Hansard

Text of statute as originally enacted

In 1834, the act was amended by the Juries (Ireland) Act 1834 (4 & 5 Will. 4. c. 8), to fix practical implementation issues with the original jury selection system, particularly around timing and administrative procedures.

Previously, Justices were required to hold October General or Quarter Sessions in each Division of Irish counties The law modified the timing to be "not less than One Month nor more than Six Weeks after the First Day of October" for special sessions to examine juror lists. The amendment addressed an issue where the Jurors Book (a registry of eligible jurors) wasn't being delivered to Sheriffs or proper officers in time for use by 1 January. This had caused practical problems with empanelling juries according to the original act's requirements. The amendment explicitly validated previous jury selections that may have deviated from the original act's procedures, declaring that jury returns and panels made under these circumstances would be considered lawful, even if they didn't strictly follow the previous act's requirements.

Juries (Ireland) Act 1839
- Act of Parliament
- Parliament of the United Kingdom
- Long title: An Act to amend Two Acts, of the Third and Fourth and Fourth and Fifth Years of His late Majesty King William the Fourth, for consolidating and amending the Laws relative to Jurors and Juries in Ireland.
- Citation: 2 & 3 Vict. c. 48
- Introduced by: David Richard Pigot MP (Commons)
- Territorial extent: Ireland

Dates
- Royal assent: 17 August 1839
- Commencement: 17 August 1839
- Repealed: 14 August 1871
Other legislation
Amends	Juries (Ireland) Act 1833; Juries (Ireland) Act 1834
Repealed by	Juries Act (Ireland) 1871
Relates to	Juries Act 1825

Status: Repealed

History of passage through Parliament

Records of Parliamentary debate relating to the statute from Hansard

Text of statute as originally enacted

In 1839, the act was amended by the Juries (Ireland) Act 1839 (2 & 3 Vict. c. 48) regarding the examination of jury lists. The act addressed practical difficulties in holding special sessions, particularly when insufficient numbers of Justices were available at prescribed times. Under the new provisions, the Lord Lieutenant of Ireland was empowered to issue warrants establishing alternative arrangements for these special sessions. To ensure public awareness, any such changes required publication in both The Dublin Gazette and local county newspapers, with notices appearing no sooner than fourteen days before the revised session dates.

The whole act, except for sections 47 and 50 were repealed by the Juries Act (Ireland) 1871 (34 & 35 Vict. c. 65), which came into force on 30 June 1872.

The whole act was repealed by section 1 of, and the schedule to, the Statute Law Revision (No. 2) Act 1888 (51 & 52 Vict. c. 3), which came into force on 24 December 1888.

== Repealed enactments ==
Section 50 of the act repealed 43 enactments, listed in that section, effective from 1 January 1834.

Section 50 of the act also provided that nothing in the act shall be construed to affect or alter any part of the Quakers Act 1695 (7 & 8 Will. 3), any powers unrepealed nor juries on civil bills before assistant barristers.

Parliament of England
Citation	Short title	Description	Extent of repeal
43 Hen. 3	De Provisionibus factis per Regem et Consilium suum	Provisions made in the Forty third Year of the Reign of King Henry the Third.	As relates to Exemption from Assizes, Juries and Inquests.
52 Hen. 3. c. 14	Juries	A Statute made in the Fifty second Year of the same Reign.	As relates to the like Exemptions.
52 Hen. 3. c. 24	Inquest	The same Statute.	As provides that all, being Twelve Years of Age, ought to appear at Inquests for the Death of Man.
13 Edw. 1. c. 30	Justices of nisi prius, etc.	A Statute made at Westminster in the Thirteenth Year of the same Reign.	As directs, that the Justices shall not put in Assizes or Juries any other than those that were summoned to the same at first.
13 Edw. 1. c. 38	Juries	The same Statute.	As ordains how many and what Sort of Persons shall be returned on Juries and Petty Assizes.
21 Edw. 1	Statutum de illis qui debent poni in Juratis et Assisis	A Statute made in the Twenty first Year of the same Reign, intituled Statutum de illis qui debent poni in Juratis et Assizis.	The whole act.
28 Edw. 1. c. 9	Juries	A Statute made in the Twenty eighth Year of the same Reign, intituled Articuli super Cartas.	As declares how Inquests and Juries are to be impannelled.
33 Edw. 1. Stat. 4	Ordinatio de Inquisitionibus	An Ordinance made in the Thirty third Year of the same Reign, commonly called An Ordinance for Inquests.	The whole act.
34 Edw. 1. Stat. 5. c. 8 (Note: The Juries Act 1825 (6 Geo. 4. c. 50) cites this as 34 Ed. 1. st. 5. c. 3.)	Ordinatio Foreste	A Statute made in the Thirty fourth Year of the same Reign, commonly called Ordinatio Forestæ.	As enjoins that none of the Ministers therein mentioned be put in Assizes, Juries or Inquests without the Forest.
5 Edw. 3. c. 10	Jurors	A Statute made in the Fifth Year of the Reign of King Edward the Third.	As relates to the Punishment of a corrupt Juror.
20 Edw. 3 Ordinance for the Justices c. 6	Justices of Assize	A Statute made in the Twentieth Year of the same Reign.	As relates to the Punishment of Embracers and corrupt Jurors.
27 Edw. 3. Stat. 2. c. 8	Ordinance of the Staples 1353	A Statute or Ordinance made in the Twenty seventh Year of the same Reign, commonly called The Ordinance of the Staples.	As prescribes the Mode of Trial where One Party or both Parties are Aliens.
28 Edw. 3. c. 13	Confirmation, etc., of 27 Ed. 3. St. 2 Act 1354	A Statute made in the Twenty eighth Year of the same Reign.	As directs how all Manner of Inquests and Proofs shall be taken between Aliens and Denizens.
34 Edw. 3. c. 4	Juries	A Statute made in the Thirty fourth Year of the same Reign.	As accords that Panels of Inquests shall be of the Neighbourhood.
34 Edw. 3. c. 8	Juries	A Statute made in the Thirty fourth Year of the same Reign.	As directs the Proceedings against Jurors taking a Reward to give their Verdict
34 Edw. 3. c. 13	Escheators	A Statute made in the Thirty fourth Year of the same Reign.	As relates to the Qualification of Jurors on Inquests of Escheat.
36 Edw. 3. St. 1. c. 13	Escheaters	A Statute made in the Thirty sixth Year of the same Reign.	As relates to Jurors on Inquests of Escheat.
38 Edw. 3. c. 12	N/A	Ahe First Statute, made in the Thirty eighth Year of the same Reign.	As ordains the Penalty on corrupt Jurors and Embracers.
42 Edw. 3. c. 11	Return of Jurors' Names at Nisi Prius Act 1368	A Statute made in the Forty second Year of the same Reign.	As directs that Panels in Assizes shall be arrayed Four Days before the Sessions, and what Sort of Jurors shall be put therein.
7 Ric. 2. c. 7	Jurors	A Statute made in the Seventh Year of the Reign of King Richard the Second.	As relates to granting a Writ of Nisi Prius at the Suit of any Jurors.
11 Hen. 4. c. 9	Jurors	A Statute made in the Eleventh Year of the Reign of King Henry the Fourth.	As directs that Jurors in Indictments shall be returned by the Sheriffs or Bailiffs, without the Domination of any.
2 H. 5. st. 2. c. 3	Jurors	The Second Statute, made in the Second Year of the Reign of King Henry the Fifth.	As relates to the Qualification of Jurors.
6 Hen. 6. c. 2	Assizes	A Statute made in the Sixth Year of the Reign of King Henry the Sixth.	As relates to the Panels in Special Assizes.
8 Hen. 6. c. 29	Inquests	A Statute made in the Eighth Year of the same Reign.	As relates to Inquests and Proofs taken between Aliens and Denizens.
23 Hen. 6. c. 9	Sheriffs and Bailiffs, Fees, etc. Act 1444	A Statute made in the Twenty third Year of the same Reign.	As ordains that no Sheriff or Undersheriff shall return any of their Officers or Servants in any of the Cases therein mentioned.
1 Ric. 3. c. 4	Sheriff's Tourns Act 1483	An Act passed in the First Year of the Reign of King Richard the Third, intituled An Act for returning sufficient Jurors.	The whole act.

Parliament of Ireland
Citation	Short title	Description	Extent of repeal
7 Hen. 6. c. 1 (I)	N/A	An Act passed in the Seventh Year of the Reign of King Henry the Sixth, intituled An Act for the Additions of Jurors.	The whole act.
13 Hen. 8. c. 3 (I)	N/A	An Act passed in the Thirteenth Year of the Reign of King Henry the Eighth, intituled An Act touching Jurors to pass in Attaint.	The whole act.
10 Chas. 1. Sess. 2. c. 13 (I)	N/A	An Act passed in the Second Session of the Tenth Year of the Reign of King Charles the First, intituled An Act concerning the Appearance of Jurors in the Nisi Prius.	The whole act.
10 & 11 Chas. 1. c. 9 (I)	N/A	An Act passed in the Tenth and Eleventh Years of the same Reign, intituled An Act for the limiting of peremptory Challenges in Cases of Treason and Felonies, and so forth.	The whole act. (Note: This act was already repealed by Criminal Statutes (Ireland) Repeal Act 1828 (9 Geo. 4. c. 53).)
6 Anne, c. 10 (I)	Administration of Justice Act 1707	An Act passed in the Sixth Year of the Reign of Queen Anne, intituled An Act for the Amendment of the Law, and the better Advancement of Justice.	As relates to Writs of Venire facias, and to Jurors having the View. I.e., sections 6, 7 and 8.
6 Geo. 1. c. 5 (I)	Toleration Act 1719	An Act passed in the Sixth Year of the Reign of King George the First, intituled An Act for exempting the Protestant Dissenters of this Kingdom from certain Penalties to which they are now subject.	As relates to Exemptions from serving upon Juries. I.e., section 11.
12 Geo. 1. c. 4 (I)	Sheriffs Act 1725	An Act passed in the Twelfth Year of the same Reign, intituled An Act for the better regulating the Office of Sheriffs, and for the ascertaining their Fees, and the Fees for suing out their Patents, and passing their Accounts.	As relates to the impanelling or Return of Juries. I.e., section 16
29 Geo. 2. c. 6 (I)	Juries Act 1755	An Act passed in the Twenty-ninth Year of the Reign of King George the Second, intituled An Act for better regulating Juries.	So far as the same relates to Counties at large.
13 & 14 Geo. 3. c. 41 (I)	N/A	An Act passed in the Thirteenth and Fourteenth Years of the Reign of King George the Third, intituled An Act for reviving and continuing several temporary Statutes, and to prevent the destructive Practice of trawling Fish in the Bay of Dublin.	As revives or continues the said Act of the Twenty- ninth Year of King George the Second. I.e., section 1.
17 & 18 Geo. 3. c. 45 (I)	Outlawries Act 1777	An Act passed in the Seventeenth and Eighteenth Years of the Reign of King George the Third, intituled An Act for the Amendment of the Law with respect to Outlawries, returning Special Juries, and the future Effects of Bankrupts, in certain Cases.	As in anywise relates to Special Juries for Trials in Counties at large. I.e., section 3 to 10.
23 & 24 Geo. 3. c. 17 (I)	Post Office Act 1783	An Act passed in the Twenty-third and Twenty-fourth Years of the Reign of King George the Third, intituled An Act for establishing a Post Office within this Kingdom.	As relates to any Exemption from serving upon any Jury or Inquest. I.e., section 35.
25 Geo. 3. c. 31 (I)	N/A	An Act passed in the Twenty-fifth Year of the same Reign, intituled An Act to take away the Challenge to the Array of Panels of Jurors for Want of a Knight on Trials which a Peer or Lord of Parliament is a Party.	The whole act.
26 Geo. 3. c. 14 (I)	County Dublin Roads Act 1786	An Act passed in the Twenty-sixth Year of the same Reign, intituled An Act for making, widening, and repairing public Roads in the County of Dublin, and for repealing Parts of several Acts formerly made for that Purpose.	As provides that any Treasurer, Inspector of the Accounts, Secretary of the Grand Jury, or Collector of any Barony, shall not be returned upon any Panel for any Jury in the County of Dublin. I.e., section 71.
34 Geo. 3. c. 23 (I)	Expiring Laws Continuance (No. 3) Act 1794	An Act passed in the Thirty-fourth Year of the same Reign, intituled An Act for reviving and continuing certain temporary Statutes.	As revives and makes perpetual the said Act of the Twenty-fifth Year of the same Reign. I.e., section 4.
35 Geo. 3. c. 28 (I)	Collection of Revenue Act 1795	An Act passed in the Thirty-fifth Year of the same Reign, intituled An Act for the better Regulation of the Receipts and Issues of His Majesty's Treasury, and for repealing an Act of Parliament passed in the Tenth Year of Henry the Seventh, intituled An Act authorizing the Treasurer to make all Officers as the Treasurer of England doth.	As relates to any Exemption from serving upon any Jury I.e., section 35.

Parliament of the United Kingdom
Citation	Short title	Description	Extent of repeal
6 Geo. 4. c. 51	Assizes (Ireland) Act 1825	An Act passed in the Parliament of the United Kingdom of Great Britain and Ireland in the Sixth Year of the Reign of His late Majesty, intituled An Act for the Amendment of the Laws with respect to Special Juries, and to Trials in Counties of Cities and Towns and Towns Corporate in Ireland.	As relates to Special Juries in any Indictments or Informations tried in any County at large in Ireland. I.e., section 1.

== See also ==
- Juries Act
- Peel's Acts
- Statute Law Revision Act
