= Juries Act (Ireland) 1871 =

Act of the Parliament of the United Kingdom

Juries Act (Ireland) 1871 (Note: Section 1.)
- Act of Parliament
- Parliament of the United Kingdom
- Long title: An Act to amend and consolidate the Laws relating to Juries in Ireland.
- Citation: 34 & 35 Vict. c. 65
- Introduced by: Thomas O'Hagan, 1st Baron O'Hagan (Lords)
- Territorial extent: Ireland (Note: Section 2.)

Dates
- Royal assent: 14 August 1871
- Commencement: 30 June 1872 (Note: Juries (Ireland) Act 1872 (35 & 36 Vict. c. 25), section 2.)
Other legislation
| Amends | See § Repealed enactments |
| Repeals/revokes | See § Repealed enactments |
| Amended by | Juries (Ireland) Act 1872; Juries (Ireland) Act 1873; Judicature (Northern Ireland) Act 1978 |
| Relates to | Juries Act 1825; Juries (Ireland) Act 1833; Juries (Ireland) Act 1834; Juries (Ireland) Act 1839; Juries (Ireland) Act 1872; Juries (Ireland) Act 1873; Jurors Qualification (Ireland) Act 1876; Juries Procedure (Ireland) Act 1876; Jurors (Ireland) Act 1894 |

Status: Amended

History of passage through Parliament

Records of Parliamentary debate relating to the statute from Hansard

Text of statute as originally enacted

The Juries Act (Ireland) 1871 (34 & 35 Vict. c. 65), also known as the Juries (Ireland) Act 1871, (Note: The Juries Procedure (Ireland) Act 1876 (39 & 40 Vict. c. 78), section 6.), is an act of the Parliament of the United Kingdom that consolidated and amended enactments for Ireland related to juries. The act notably replaced the existing system of jury qualification based on property requirements with a new system based on poor law ratings.

== Background ==
In the United Kingdom, acts of Parliament remain in force until expressly repealed. Blackstone's Commentaries on the Laws of England, published in the late 18th century, raised questions about the system and structure of the common law and the poor drafting and disorder of the existing statute book.

In 1806, the Commission on Public Records passed a resolution requesting the production of a report on the best mode of reducing the volume of the statute book. From 1810 to 1825, The Statutes of the Realm was published, providing for the first time the authoritative collection of acts.

By the early 19th century, English criminal law had become increasingly intricate and difficult to navigate due to the large number of acts passed that had accumulated over many years. This complexity posed challenges for law enforcement.

In 1825, the Juries Act 1825 (6 Geo. 4. c. 50) was passed, which consolidated for England and Wales statutes related to juries and repealed over 65 statutes.

In 1827, Peel's Acts were passed to modernise, consolidate and repeal provisions of the criminal law, territorially limited to England and Wales and Scotland, including:

- Criminal Statutes Repeal Act 1827 (7 & 8 Geo. 4. c. 27), which repealed for England and Wales over 140 enactments relating to the criminal law.
- Criminal Law Act 1827 (7 & 8 Geo. 4. c. 28), which modernised the administration of criminal justice.
- Larceny Act 1827 (7 & 8 Geo. 4. c. 29), which consolidated provisions in the law relating to larceny.
- Malicious Injuries to Property Act 1827 (7 & 8 Geo. 4. c. 30), which consolidated provisions in the law relating to malicious injuries to property.

In 1828, parallel bills for Ireland to Peel's Acts were introduced, becoming:

- Criminal Statutes (Ireland) Repeal Act 1828 (9 Geo. 4. 54), which repealed for Ireland over 140 enactments relating to the criminal law.
- Criminal Law (Ireland) Act 1828 (9 Geo. 4. 54), which modernised the administration of criminal justice.
- Larceny (Ireland) Act 1828 (9 Geo. 4. c. 55) which consolidated provisions in the law relating to larceny.
- Malicious Injuries to Property (Ireland) Act 1828 (9 Geo. 4. c. 56), which consolidated provisions in the law relating to malicious injuries to property.

In 1828, the Offences Against the Person Act 1828 (9 Geo. 4. c. 31) was passed, which consolidated provisions in the law relating to offences against the person and repealed for England and Wales almost 60 related enactments. In 1829, the Offences Against the Person (Ireland) Act 1829 (10 Geo. 4. c. 34) was passed, which consolidated provisions in the law relating to offences against the person and repealed for Ireland almost 60 enactments relating to the criminal law.

In 1828, the Criminal Law (India) Act 1828 (9 Geo. 4. c. 74) was passed, which repealed for India offences repealed by the Criminal Statutes Repeal Act 1827 (7 & 8 Geo. 4. c. 27) and the Offences Against the Person Act 1828 (9 Geo. 4. c. 31).

In 1833, the Juries (Ireland) Act 1833 (3 & 4 Will. 4. c. 91) was passed, which consolidated for Ireland statutes related to juries and repealed over 40 enactments.

In 1861, the Criminal Consolidation Acts were passed to consolidate and modernise the criminal law:

- Accessories and Abettors Act 1861 (24 & 25 Vict. c. 94), which modernised provisions in the law relating to Aiding and abetting.
- Criminal Statutes Repeal Act 1861 (24 & 25 Vict. c. 95), which repealed for England and Wales and Ireland over 100 enactments relating to the criminal law.
- Larceny Act 1861 (24 & 25 Vict. c. 96), which modernised provisions in the law relating to larceny.
- Malicious Damage Act 1861 (24 & 25 Vict. c. 97), which modernised provisions in the law relating to malicious injury to property.
- Forgery Act 1861 (24 & 25 Vict. c. 98), which modernised provisions in the law relating to forgery.
- Coinage Offences Act 1861 (24 & 25 Vict. c. 99), which modernised provisions in the law relating to coinage.
- Offences Against the Person Act 1861 (24 & 25 Vict. c. 100), which modernised provisions in the law relating to offences against the person.

== Passage ==
The Juries (Ireland) Bill had its first reading in the House of Lords on 15 May 1871, presented by the Lord Chancellor of Ireland, Thomas O'Hagan, 1st Baron O'Hagan. The bill had its second reading in the House of Lords on 19 May 1871, introduced by Thomas O'Hagan, 1st Baron O'Hagan. During debate, Lord O'Hagan stated that the legislation was introduced in response to serious problems with the existing jury system, including:

- Outdated qualification requirements based on freeholds and leaseholds
- Poor quality jury panels, with up to 66% of qualified persons being excluded in some counties
- Evidence of religious discrimination (cited case from 1869 where 202 of 250 jurors were Protestants)
- Arbitrary power of sub-sheriffs in selecting jurors, which had led to cases of justice being obstructed

Key provisions of the bill highlighted by Lord O'Hagan included:

- Replacing existing juror qualifications with a new system based on Poor Law ratings (£30 for petty jurors, £100 for special jurors)
- Transferring jury list preparation from barony constables to Poor Law Union clerks
- Moving jury list revision from magistrates to Revising Barristers
- Introducing a rotation system to prevent the same individuals from being repeatedly summoned
- Reforming the sub-sheriff's power in jury selection by implementing an alphabetical selection system

The bill was committed to a committee of the whole house, which met and reported on 3 July 1871, with amendments. The amended bill had its third reading in the House of Lords on 4 July 1871 and passed, with amendments.

The amended bill had its first reading in the House of Commons on 7 July 1871. The bill had its second reading in the House of Commons on 18 July 1871 and was committed to a committee of the whole house, which met on 20 July 1871 and reported on 21 July 1871, with amendments. The amended bill had its third reading in the House of Commons on 24 July 1871 and passed, without amendments.

The amended bill was considered and agreed to by the House of Lords on 3 August 1871.

The bill was granted royal assent on 14 August 1871.

== Subsequent developments ==
Juries (Ireland) Act 1872 (Note: The citation of this act by this short title was authorised by the Short Titles Act 1896, section 1 and the first schedule. Due to the repeal of those provisions it is now authorised by section 19(2) of the Interpretation Act 1978.)
- Act of Parliament
- Parliament of the United Kingdom
- Long title: An Act to amend the Juries Act (Ireland), 1871.
- Citation: 35 & 36 Vict. c. 25
- Introduced by: Thomas O'Hagan, 1st Baron O'Hagan (Lords)
- Territorial extent: Ireland (Note: Section 9.)

Dates
- Royal assent: 27 June 1872
- Commencement: 27 June 1872 (Note: The Acts of Parliament (Commencement) Act 1793.)
- Repealed: 11 August 1975 (Note: The Juries (Northern Ireland) Order 1974 (Commencement No. 2) Order (Northern Ireland) 1975 (SI 1975/201).)
Other legislation
| Amends | Juries (Ireland) Act 1871 |
| Repealed by | Statute Law Revision Act 1883; Statute Law Revision (No. 2) Act 1893; Jury Laws Amendment Act (Northern Ireland) 1926; Juries Act (Northern Ireland) 1953; Juries (Northern Ireland) Order 1974 |
| Relates to | Juries Act 1825; Juries (Ireland) Act 1833; Juries (Ireland) Act 1834; Juries (Ireland) Act 1839; Juries Act (Ireland) 1871; Juries (Ireland) Act 1873; Jurors Qualification (Ireland) Act 1876; Juries Procedure (Ireland) Act 1876; Jurors (Ireland) Act 1894 |

Status: Repealed

History of passage through Parliament

Records of Parliamentary debate relating to the statute from Hansard

Text of statute as originally enacted

No order was issued under section 52 of the act, which was required for the act to come into force. In 1872, the act was amended by the Juries (Ireland) Act 1872 (35 & 36 Vict. c. 25), which provided that the administrative parts of the act, including preparing juror lists, making juror books, and delivering them to sheriffs, would come into effect on 30 June 1872. The rest of the act, including the actual selection and summoning of jurors under the new system, would begin on the first day of Hilary Term 1873.

By March 1873, the act faced significant criticism in Parliament, with reports raised by of illiterate and non-English speaking jurors at the Clare Spring Assizes, and concerns about questionable verdicts across multiple counties. Lord O'Hagan, who had introduced the act, defended it by arguing these reports were exaggerated and explaining that the law aimed to modernise an outdated jury system by introducing rating-based qualifications instead of property requirements. However, he acknowledged potential problems and indicated the government was investigating the act's implementation.

On 31 March 1873, a select committee was appointed "to inquire and report on the working of the Irish Jury System before and since the passing of the Act 34 & 35 Vic. c. 65; and, whether any and what amendments in the Law are necessary to secure the due administration of justice." The select committee published their first report on 5 May 1873, special report on 16 June 1873 and second report on 7 July 1873.

Juries (Ireland) Act 1873 (Note: Section 9.)
- Act of Parliament
- Parliament of the United Kingdom
- Long title: An Act to amend the Law relating to Juries in Ireland.
- Citation: 36 & 37 Vict. c. 27
- Introduced by: William Cavendish, Marquess of Hartington MP (Commons)
- Territorial extent: United Kingdom

Dates
- Royal assent: 16 June 1873
- Commencement: 11 January 1875 (Note: Section 10.)
- Repealed: 25 August 1883
Other legislation
| Amends | Juries (Ireland) Act 1871 |
| Repealed by | Statute Law Revision Act 1883 |
| Relates to | Juries Act 1825; Juries (Ireland) Act 1833; Juries (Ireland) Act 1834; Juries (Ireland) Act 1839; Juries Act (Ireland) 1871; Juries (Ireland) Act 1872; Jurors Qualification (Ireland) Act 1876; Juries Procedure (Ireland) Act 1876; Jurors (Ireland) Act 1894 |

Status: Repealed

History of passage through Parliament

Records of Parliamentary debate relating to the statute from Hansard

Text of statute as originally enacted

In 1873, the act was amended by the Juries (Ireland) Act 1873 (36 & 37 Vict. c. 27) to address some of these concerns.

== Repealed enactments ==
Section 4 of the act repealed 8 enactments, listed in the first schedule to the act, effective from the commencement of the act. Section 4 of the act also included safeguards to preserve prior actions and legal proceedings by explicitly maintaining the right to prosecute offences committed before the act's commencement.

| Citation | Short title | Description | Extent of repeal |
|---|---|---|---|
| 40 Geo. 3. c. 72 (I) | Juries Act 1800 | An Act for the better regulation of trials by jury in the Court of King's Bench, Common Pleas, and Exchequer, during term, and in the sittings after term. | The whole act, except the 7th section. |
| 3 & 4 Will. 4. c. 91 | Juries (Ireland) Act 1833 | An Act for consolidating and amending the laws relative to jurors and juries in Ireland. | The whole act, except the 47th and 50th sections. |
| 4 & 5 Will. 4. c. 8 | Juries (Ireland) Act 1834 | An Act to amend an Act passed in the last session for consolidating and amending the laws relative to jurors and juries in Ireland | The whole act. |
| 2 & 3 Vict. c. 48 | Juries (Ireland) Act 1839 | An Act to amend two Acts of the third and fourth years of His late Majesty King William the Fourth, for consolidating and amending the laws relative to jurors and juries in Ireland. | The whole act. |
| 3 & 4 Vict. c. 108 | Municipal Corporations (Ireland) Act 1840 | An Act for the regulation of municipal corporations in Ireland. | Section 179, so far as relates to the qualification of jurors. |
| 8 & 9 Vict. c. 67 | Juries (Ireland) Act 1845 | An Act for making further regulations for more effectually securing the correctness of the jurors books in Ireland. | The whole act. |
| 12 & 13 Vict. c. 91 | Dublin, Collection of Rates Act 1849 | An Act to provide for the collection of rates in the city of Dublin. | Section 87 of this Act, by which the collector-general of the city of Dublin is required to make out the lists of persons liable to serve on juries . |
| 16 & 17 Vict. c. 113 | Common Law Procedure Amendment Act (Ireland) 1853 | An Act to amend the procedure in the superior courts of common law in Ireland. | Section 109, section 110, section 111, section 112, section 113, section 114, section 115, section 116, and section 117. |
| 31 & 32 Vict. c. 75 | Juries Act (Ireland) 1868 | An Act to amend the laws relating to petit juries in Ireland. | Section 4 of this Act. |

== See also ==
- Peel's Acts
- Criminal Law Consolidation Acts 1861
- Statute Law Revision Act
