= Perpetuation of Laws Act 1548 =

Act of the Parliament of England

- Act of Parliament
- Parliament of England
- Long title: An Act for the Continuance of certain Statutes.
- Citation: 2 & 3 Edw. 6. c. 32
- Territorial extent: England and Wales

Dates
- Royal assent: 14 March 1549
- Commencement: 24 November 1548 (Note: Start of session.)
- Repealed: 28 July 1863

Other legislation
- Amends: See § Continued enactments
- Repealed by: Statute Law Revision Act 1863
- Relates to: See Expiring laws continuance acts

Status: Repealed

Text of statute as originally enacted

The Perpetuation of Laws Act 1548 (2 & 3 Edw. 6. c. 32) was an act of the Parliament of England that made perpetual various older enactments.

== Background ==
In the United Kingdom, acts of Parliament remain in force until expressly repealed. Many acts of parliament, however, contained time-limited sunset clauses, requiring legislation to revive enactments that had expired or to continue enactments that would otherwise expire.

== Provisions ==
=== Continued enactments ===
Section 1 of the act made the Mispleadings, Jeofails, etc. Act 1540 (32 Hen. 8. c. 30) and the Jurors Act 1543 (35 Hen. 8. c. 6) as continued by the Juries Act 1545 (37 Hen. 8. c. 22) perpetual.

== Subsequent developments ==
The Select Committee on Temporary Laws, Expired or Expiring, appointed in 1796, inspected and considered all temporary laws, observing irregularities in the construction of expiring laws continuance acts, making recommendations and emphasising the importance of the Committee for Expired and Expiring Laws.

The whole act was repealed by section 1 of, and the schedule to, the Statute Law Revision Act 1863 (26 & 27 Vict. c. 125), which came into force on 28 July 1863.
