= Juries Act 1825 =

Act of the Parliament of the United Kingdom

Juries Act 1825 (Note: The citation of this act by this short title was authorised by section 1 of, and the first schedule to, the Short Titles Act 1896. Due to the repeal of those provisions it is now authorised by section 19(2) of the Interpretation Act 1978.)
- Act of Parliament
- Parliament of the United Kingdom
- Long title: An Act for consolidating and amending the Laws relative to Jurors and Juries.
- Citation: 6 Geo. 4 c. 50
- Introduced by: Sir Robert Peel MP (Commons)
- Territorial extent: United Kingdom

Dates
- Royal assent: 22 June 1825
- Commencement: 1 January 1826 (Note: Section 62)
Other legislation
Amends	See § Repealed enactments
Repeals/revokes	See § Repealed enactments
Amended by	Naturalization Act 1870; Statute Law Revision Act 1874; Statute Law Revision Act 1875; Coroners Act 1887; Statute Law Revision Act 1890; County Common Juries Act 1910; Criminal Justice Act 1948; Criminal Law Act 1967; Courts Act 1971; Criminal Justice Act 1972
Relates to	Juries (Ireland) Act 1833

Status: Partially repealed

History of passage through Parliament

Records of Parliamentary debate relating to the statute from Hansard

Text of statute as originally enacted

Revised text of statute as amended

Text of the Juries Act 1825 as in force today (including any amendments) within the United Kingdom, from legislation.gov.uk.

The Juries Act 1825 (6 Geo. 4. c. 50), also known as the County Juries Act 1825, is an act of the Parliament of the United Kingdom that consolidated and amended statutes for England and Wales related to juries. The act abolished outdated penalties, moved responsibility for creating jury lists from petty constables to churchwardens and parish overseers, expanded jury qualification to include bankers and merchants and devise a new method of jury selection. The act repealed for England and Wales statutes from 1259 to 1824.

Similar provision was made for Ireland by the Juries (Ireland) Act 1833 (3 & 4 Will. 4. c. 91).

== Background ==
In the United Kingdom, acts of Parliament remain in force until expressly repealed. Blackstone's Commentaries on the Laws of England, published in the late 18th century, raised questions about the system and structure of the common law and the poor drafting and disorder of the existing statute book.

In 1806, the Commission on Public Records passed a resolution requesting the production of a report on the best mode of reducing the volume of the statute book. From 1810 to 1825, The Statutes of the Realm was published, providing for the first time the authoritative collection of acts.

By the early 19th century, English criminal law had become increasingly intricate and difficult to navigate due to the large number of acts passed that had accumulated over many years. This complexity posed challenges for law enforcement.

== Passage ==
Leave to bring in the Juries Regulation Bill to the House of Commons was granted on 9 March 1825 to the Home Secretary Sir Robert Peel MP. In debate, Sir Robert Peel MP stated that the aim of the bill was to consolidate around 85 statutes into one clear, abolish outdated penalties including attaint of jurors, move responsibility for creating jury lists from petty constables to churchwardens and parish overseers, expand juries qualification to include bankers and merchants and devise a new method of jury selection based on random draw. The bill was supported by several MPs, including Dr Stephen Lushington MP.

The bill, renamed to the Juries Bill, had its first reading in the House of Commons on 11 March 1825, introduced by Sir Robert Peel MP. The bill had its second reading in the House of Commons on 11 March 1825 and was committed to a Committee of the Whole House, which met on 15 March 1825 and reported on 16 March 1825, with amendments. The amended bill was considered by the House of Commons on 27 May 1825 and had its third reading in the House of Commons on 30 March 1825 and passed, with amendments.

The amended bill had its first reading in the House of Lords on 2 June 1825. The bill had its second reading in the House of Lords on 6 June 1825 and was committed to a committee of the whole house, which met on 13 June 1825 and reported on ,14 June 1825 amendments. The amended bill had its third reading in the House of Lords on 15 June 1825 and passed, without amendments.

The amended bill was considered and agreed to by the House of Commons on 17 June 1825.

The bill was granted royal assent on 22 June 1825.

== Selected clauses ==
=== Qualifying for jury service ===
Section 1 of the act provided the following requirements qualified an individual for jury service:

- Male
- Between 21 and 60 years old
- At least one of:
  - Owning land worth at least £10 a year if rented
  - Having a lease of at least 21 years length of land with an annual rental value of at least £20
  - Being a householder paying the poor rate on a property that has at least fifteen windows and an annual rental value of at least £30 (Middlesex) or £20 (elsewhere in England)

The requirement in the Bill of Rights 1689 (1 Will. & Mar. Sess. 2. c. 2) that jurors in cases of high treason be freeholders was abolished.

In Wales the qualifications were scaled to three-fifths of the above values.

=== Exemptions from jury service ===
Section 2 of the act exempted various groups from jury services:

- Peers of the realm
- Judges
- Church of England clergy
- Roman Catholic priests
- Persons whose only occupation was as a protestant preacher (or preacher and schoolmaster)
- Practising lawyers
- Officers of the courts
- Coroners
- Jailers
- Physicians and surgeons
- Apothecaries
- Officers of the Army and Royal Navy
- Maritime pilots
- Staff of the Royal Household
- Officers of HM Customs and Excise
- High sheriffs, high constables
- Parish clerks

=== Juries restricted to British subjects only ===
Section 3 of the act restricted service on a jury to natural born subjects of the Crown.

=== Special juries ===
Section 31 of the act listed qualification for service on special juries. They were required to be one of:

- A person entitled to be addressed as esquire
- A person of 'higher degree' (i.e. upper class)
- A banker
- A merchant

=== Juries de medietate linguae ===
Section 47 of the act reiterated that foreigners were entitled to have one-half of a jury judging them to consist of fellow foreigners. Those foreign jurors had to be available in the area where the trial was held, but were otherwise exempted from the qualifications required of jurors at the time (such as owing land).

== Legacy ==
=== Subsequent developments ===
The territorial extent of the act was limited to England and Wales. Section 50 of the Juries (Ireland) Act 1833 (3 & 4 Will. 4. c. 91) largely mirrored the act for Ireland, including repealing acts extended to Ireland by the passage of Poynings' Act 1495.

In 1827, Peel's Acts were passed to modernise, consolidate and repeal provisions of the criminal law, territorially limited to England and Wales and Scotland, including:

- Criminal Statutes Repeal Act 1827 (7 & 8 Geo. 4. c. 27), which repealed for England and Wales over 140 enactments relating to the criminal law.
- Criminal Law Act 1827 (7 & 8 Geo. 4. c. 28), which modernised the administration of criminal justice.
- Larceny Act 1827 (7 & 8 Geo. 4. c. 29), which consolidated provisions in the law relating to larceny.
- Malicious Injuries to Property Act 1827 (7 & 8 Geo. 4. c. 30), which consolidated provisions in the law relating to malicious injuries to property.

In 1828, parallel bills for Ireland to Peel's Acts were introduced, becoming:

- Criminal Statutes (Ireland) Repeal Act 1828 (9 Geo. 4. 54), which repealed for Ireland over 140 enactments relating to the criminal law.
- Criminal Law (Ireland) Act 1828 (9 Geo. 4. 54), which modernised the administration of criminal justice.
- Larceny (Ireland) Act 1828 (9 Geo. 4. c. 55) which consolidated provisions in the law relating to larceny.
- Malicious Injuries to Property (Ireland) Act 1828 (9 Geo. 4. c. 56), which consolidated provisions in the law relating to malicious injuries to property.

In 1828, the Offences Against the Person Act 1828 (9 Geo. 4. c. 31) was passed, which consolidated provisions in the law relating to offences against the person and repealed for England and Wales almost 60 related enactments. In 1829, the Offences Against the Person (Ireland) Act 1829 (10 Geo. 4. c. 34) was passed, which consolidated provisions in the law relating to offences against the person and repealed for Ireland almost 60 enactments relating to the criminal law.

In 1828, the Criminal Law (India) Act 1828 (9 Geo. 4. c. 74) was passed, which repealed for India offences repealed by the Criminal Statutes Repeal Act 1827 (7 & 8 Geo. 4. c. 27) and the Offences Against the Person Act 1828 (9 Geo. 4. c. 31).

=== Repeal ===
Section 62 of the act was repealed by section 1 of, and the schedule to, the Statute Law Revision Act 1874 (37 & 38 Vict. c. 35), which came into force on 16 July 1874.

Section five from "and shall annex" to the end of that section, section six to "upon any High Constable" and from "provided also, that where any Parish or Township" to the end of that section, section ten, the words "to the High Constable and" and from "and the High Constable shall receive" to the end of that section, section forty-seven, section forty-six, the words "to any High Constable, or" and the Warrant for returning Lists of Jurors, and Precept for returning Lists of Jurors, in the Schedule were repealed by section 1 of, and the schedule to, the Statute Law Revision Act 1875 (38 & 39 Vict. c. 66), which came into force on 11 August 1875.

Sections 58 and 59 of the act was repealed by section 2 of, and the schedule to, the Public Authorities Protection Act 1893 (56 & 57 Vict. c. 61), which came into force on 1 January 1894.

Section 61 of the act was repealed by section 10(2) of, and part I of schedule 3 to, the Criminal Law Act 1967, which came into force on 1 January 1968.

The whole of the act, except sections 1, 27, 29 and 50 of the act, was repealed by the Courts Act 1971, which came into force on 1 January 1972.

Sections 1, 27 and 50 of the act were repealed by section 64(2) of, and part I of schedule 6 to, the Criminal Justice Act 1972, which came into force on 30 March 1974.

Only section 29 of the act remains in force. It requires challenges by the Crown to the composition of juries to only be made for cause.

== Repealed enactments ==
Section 62 of the act repealed 66 enactments, listed in that section, effective from 1 January 1886.

Section 63 of the act provided that nothing in the act shall be construed to affect or alter any part of the Quakers Act 1695 (7 & 8 Will. 3. c. 34) or the Settlement of Moravians in America Act 1748 (22 Geo. 2. c. 30).

Section 64 of the act provided that nothing in the act shall be construed to extend, alter or affect any power or authority which the Court previously had or any practice or form in regard to trials by jury, jury process, juries or jurors, except where repealed or altered by the act or where it is inconsistent with the provisions of the act.

Citation	Short title	Description	Extent of repeal
43 Hen. 3	De Provisionibus factis per Regem et Consilium suum	Provisions made in the Forty third Year of the Reign of King Henry the Third.	As relates to Exemption from Assizes, Juries and Inquests.
52 Hen. 3. c. 14	Juries	A Statute made in the Fifty second Year of the same Reign.	As relates to the like Exemptions.
52 Hen. 3. c. 24	Inquest	The same Statute.	As provides that all, being Twelve Years of Age, ought to appear at Inquests for the Death of Man.
12 Edw. 1	Statuta Wallie	Statutes made in the Twelfth Year of the Reign of King Edward the First, intituled Statuta Walliæ.	As relates to Persons of Twelve Years of Age being summoned upon Coroners' Inquests.
13 Edw. 1. c. 30	Justices of nisi prius, etc.	A Statute made at Westminster in the Thirteenth Year of the same Reign.	As directs, that the Justices shall not put in Assizes or Juries any other than those that were summoned to the same at first.
13 Edw. 1. c. 38	Juries	The same Statute.	As ordains how many and what Sort of Persons shall be returned on Juries and Petty Assizes.
21 Ed. 1. st. 1	Statutum de illis qui debent poni in Juratis et Assisis	A Statute made in the Twenty first Year of the same Reign, intituled Statutum de illis qui debent poni in Juratis et Assizis.	The whole act.
28 Ed. 1. st. 3. c. 9	Juries	A Statute made in the Twenty eighth Year of the same Reign, intituled Articuli super Cartas.	As declares how Inquests and Juries are to be impannelled.
33 Ed. 1. stat. 4	Ordinatio de Inquisitionibus	An Ordinance made in the Thirty third Year of the same Reign, commonly called An Ordinance for Inquests.	The whole act.
34 Ed. 1. st. 5. c. 3	Ordinatio Foreste	A Statute made in the Thirty fourth Year of the same Reign, commonly called Ordinatio Forestæ.	As enjoins that none of the Ministers therein mentioned be put in Assizes, Juries or Inquests without the Forest.
5 Ed. 3. c. 10	Jurors	A Statute made in the Fifth Year of the Reign of King Edward the Third.	As relates to the Punishment of a corrupt Juror.
20 Edw. 3. Ordinance for the Justices c. 6	Justices of Assize	A Statute made in the Twentieth Year of the same Reign.	As relates to the Punishment of Embracers and corrupt Jurors.
27 Ed. 3. st. 2. c. 8	Ordinance of the Staples 1353	A Statute or Ordinance made in the Twenty seventh Year of the same Reign, commonly called The Ordinance of the Staples.	As prescribes the Mode of Trial where One Party or both Parties are Aliens.
28 Edw. 3. c. 13	Confirmation, etc., of 27 Ed. 3. St. 2 Act 1354	A Statute made in the Twenty eighth Year of the same Reign.	As directs how all Manner of Inquests and Proofs shall be taken between Aliens and Denizens.
34 Edw. 3. c. 4	Juries	A Statute made in the Thirty fourth Year of the same Reign.	As accords that Panels of Inquests shall be of the Neighbourhood.
34 Edw. 3. c. 8	Juries	A Statute made in the Thirty fourth Year of the same Reign.	As directs the Proceedings against Jurors taking a Reward to give their Verdict
34 Edw. 3. c. 13	Escheators	A Statute made in the Thirty fourth Year of the same Reign.	As relates to the Qualification of Jurors on Inquests of Escheat.
36 Ed. 3. st. 1. c. 13	Escheaters	A Statute made in the Thirty sixth Year of the same Reign.	As relates to Jurors on Inquests of Escheat.
38 Edw. 3. c. 12	N/A	Ahe First Statute, made in the Thirty eighth Year of the same Reign.	As ordains the Penalty on corrupt Jurors and Embracers.
42 Edw. 3. c. 11	Return of Jurors' Names at Nisi Prius Act 1368	A Statute made in the Forty second Year of the same Reign.	As directs that Panels in Assizes shall be arrayed Four Days before the Sessions, and what Sort of Jurors shall be put therein.
7 Ric. 2. c. 7	Jurors	A Statute made in the Seventh Year of the Reign of King Richard the Second.	As relates to granting a Writ of Nisi Prius at the Suit of any Jurors.
11 Hen. 4. c. 9	Jurors	A Statute made in the Eleventh Year of the Reign of King Henry the Fourth.	As directs that Jurors in Indictments shall be returned by the Sheriffs or Bailiffs, without the Domination of any.
2 H. 5. st. 2. c. 3	Jurors	The Second Statute, made in the Second Year of the Reign of King Henry the Fifth.	As relates to the Qualification of Jurors.
6 Hen. 6. c. 2	Assizes	A Statute made in the Sixth Year of the Reign of King Henry the Sixth.	As relates to the Panels in Special Assizes.
8 Hen. 6. c. 29	Inquests	A Statute made in the Eighth Year of the same Reign.	As relates to Inquests and Proofs taken between Aliens and Denizens.
23 Hen. 6. c. 9	Sheriffs and Bailiffs, Fees, etc. Act 1444	A Statute made in the Twenty third Year of the same Reign.	As ordains that no Sheriff or Undersheriff shall return any of their Officers or Servants in any of the Cases therein mentioned.
33 Hen. 6. c.2	Repeal of 31 Hen. 6. c. 6, jurors	A Statute made in the Thirty third Year of the same Reign.	As relates to the Qualification of Jurors taking Indictments, in the County Palatine of Lancaster, and in other Counties.
8 Edw. 4. c. 3	Juries Act 1468	A Statute made in the Eighth Year of the Reign of King Edward the Fourth.	As relates to Jurors in Middlesex.
1 Ric. 3. c. 4	Sheriff's Tourns Act 1483	An Act passed in the First Year of the Reign of King Richard the Third, intituled An Act for returning of sufficient Jurors.	The whole act.
19 Hen. 7. c. 13	Riot Act 1503	An Act passed in the Nineteenth Year of the Reign of King Henry the Seventh, intituled De Riotis Reprimendis.	The whole act.
1 Hen. 8. c. 8	Escheators Act 1509	An Act passed in the First Year of the Reign of King Henry the Eighth, intituled An Act against Escheators and Commissioners for making false Returns of Offices and Commissions.	As enacts what Qualification every Juror returned before Escheators or Commissioners of the Crown shall have within the same Shire where the Inquiry shall be made
3 Hen. 8. c. 2	Escheators Act 1511	An Act passed in the Third Year of the same Reign, to perpetuate the last mentioned Act.	As perpetuates that Part thereof which is herein referred to.
3 Hen. 8. c. 12	Juries Act 1511	An Act passed in the same Year of the same Reign, intituled An Act against Sheriffs for Abuses.	The whole act.
4 Hen. 8. c. 3	Juries in London Act 1512	An Act passed in the Fourth Year of the same Reign, intituled Pour le Juris infra Civitatem London.	The whole act. (Note: This act was wholly repealed by the Statute Law Revision Act 1863 (26 & 27 Vict. c. 125).)
5 Hen. 8. c. 5	Juries in London Act 1513	An Act passed in the Fifth Year of the same Reign, intituled An Act concerning Juries in London.	As relates to Jurors impannelled for the Trial of Issues joined in any of the Courts at Westminster, and triable in the City of London.
5 Hen. 8. c. 6	Surgeons Act 1513	An Act passed in the same Year of the same Reign, intituled An Act that Surgeons be discharged of Constableship, and other Things.	As relates to Juries.
22 Hen. 8. c. 14	Abjuration, etc. Act 1530	An Act passed in the Twenty second Year of the same Reign, intituled An Act concerning Abjurations into Sanctuaries.	As relates to peremptory Challenges in Murder and Felony. I.e., section 6
33 Hen. 8. c. 23	Criminal Law Act 1541	An Act passed in the Thirty third Year of the same Reign, intituled An Act to proceed by a Commission of Oyer and Determiner against such Persons as shall confess Treasons, without remanding the same to be tried in the same Shire where the Offence was committed.	As relates to Challenges for Want of Freehold. I.e., section 2
34 & 35 Hen. 8. c. 26	Laws in Wales Act 1542	An Act passed in the Thirty fourth and Thirty fifth Years of the same Reign, intituled An Act for certain Ordinances in the King's Majesty's Dominions and Principality of Wales.	As relates to Tales, and to the Qualifications of Jurors in the Cases therein mentioned. I.e., sections 103, 107 and 108.
35 Hen. 8. c. 6	Jurors Act 1543	An Act passed in the Thirty fifth Year of the same Reign, intituled An Act concerning the Appearance of Jurors in the Nisi Prius.	The whole act.
1 Edw. 6. c. 12	Treason Act 1547	An Act passed in the First Year of the Reign of King Edward the Sixth, intituled An Act for the Repeal of certain Statutes concerning Treasons and Felonies.	As relates to Challenges for the Hundred. I.e. section 11
2 & 3 Edw. 6. c. 32	Perpetuation of Laws Act 1548	An Act passed in the Second and Third Years of the same Reign, intituled An Act for the Continuance of certain Statutes.	As relates to the said Act of the Thirty fifth Year of King Henry the Eighth.
4 & 5 Ph. & M. c. 7	Juries Act 1557	An Act passed in the Fourth and Fifth Years of the Reign of King Philip and Queen Mary, intituled An Act to make up the Jury de circumstantibus, where the King and Queen's Majesty is a Party.	The whole act.
5 Eliz. 1. c. 25	Juries Act 1562	An Act passed in the Fifth Year of the Reign of Queen Elizabeth, intituled An Act to fill up Juries de circumstantibus lacking in Wales.	The whole act.
14 Eliz. 1. c. 9	Juries Act 1572	An Act passed in the Fourteenth Year of the same Reign, intituled An Act declaring that the Tenant and Defendant may have a Tales de circumstantibus, as well as the Demandant or Plaintiff.	The whole act.
27 Eliz. 1. c. 6	Juries Act 1584	Two Acts passed in the Twenty seventh Year of the same Reign, the one intituled An Act for the Returning of sufficient Jurors, and for the better Expedition of Trials, and the other intituled An Act for the levying of Issues lost by Jurors.	The whole act.
27 Eliz. 1. c. 7	Juries (No. 2) Act 1584	Two Acts passed in the Twenty seventh Year of the same Reign, the one intituled An Act for the Returning of sufficient Jurors, and for the better Expedition of Trials, and the other intituled An Act for the levying of Issues lost by Jurors.	The whole act.
39 Eliz. 1. c. 18	Continuance, etc. of Laws Act 1597	An Act passed in the Thirty ninth Year of the same Reign, intituled An Act for the reviving, Continuance, Explanation, perfecting and repealing of divers Statutes.	As relates to the said last mentioned Act. I.e., section 32.
1 W. & M. st. 2. c. 2	Bill of Rights	An Act passed in the First Year of the Reign of King William and Queen Mary, intituled An Act declaring the Rights and Liberties of the Subject, and settling the Succession of the Crown.	As declares that Jurors which pass upon Men in Trials for High Treason ought to be Freeholders. I.e., section 1.
4 & 5 Will. & Mar. c. 24	Estreats (Personal Representatives) Act 1692	An Act passed in the Fourth and Fifth Years of the same Reign, intituled An Act for reviving, continuing and explaining several Laws therein mentioned which are expired and near expiring.	As relates to Jurors.
6 & 7 Will. & Mar. c. 4	Exemptions of Apothecaries Act 1694	An Act passed in the Sixth and Seventh Years of the same Reign, intituled An Act for exempting Apothecaries from serving the Offices of Constable, Scavenger and other Parish and Ward Offices, and from serving upon Juries.	As relates to Juries.
7 & 8 Will. 3 c. 32 (Note: This is incorrectly cited as "7 & 8 W. & M. c. 32".)	Juries Act 1695	An Act passed in the Seventh and Eighth Years of the same Reign, intituled An Act for the Ease of Jurors, and better regulating of Juries.	The whole act.
1 Anne, st. 2. c. 13	Continuance of Laws Act 1702	An Act passed in the First Year of the Reign of Queen Anne, intituled An Act for continuing former Acts for exporting Leather, and for Ease of Jurors, and for reviving and making more effectual an Act relating to Vagrants.	As continues the said Act of the Seventh and Eighth Years of King William the Third; and also so much thereof as relates to the Qualification of Jurors in the County of York. I.e., sections 2 and 3.
3 & 4 Ann. c. 18	Perpetuation and Amendment of Laws Act 1704	An Act passed in the Third and Fourth Years of the Reign of Queen Anne, intituled An Act for making perpetual an Act for the more easy Recovery of small Tithes, and also an Act for the more easy obtaining Partition of Lands of Coparcenary, Joint Tenancy, and Tenancy in common, and also for making more effectual, and amending several Acts relating to the Return of Jurors.	As relates to Jurors. I.e., sections 3 to 6.
4 & 5 Ann. c. 16	Administration of Justice Act 1705	An Act passed in the Fourth Year of the same Reign, intituled An Act for the Amendment of the Law, and the better Advancement of Justice.	As relates to Writs of Venire Facias, and to Jurors having the View. I.e., sections 6, 7 and 9.
7 Ann. c. 21	Treason Act 1708	An Act passed in the Seventh Year of the same Reign, intituled An Act for improving the Union of the Two Kingdoms.	As relates to giving a List of the Jury to the Party indicted of High Treason or Misprision of Treason. I.e., section 11.
10 Ann. c. 14	Continuance of Laws Act 1711	An Act passed in the Tenth Year of the same Reign, intituled An Act for the reviving and continuing several Acts therein mentioned, for the preventing Mischiefs which may happen by Fire, for building and repairing County Gaols, for exempting Apothecaries from serving Parish and Ward Offices, and serving upon Juries, and relating to the returning of Jurors.	As relates to Juries and Jurors.
9 Geo. 1. c. 8	Continuance of Laws Act 1722	An Act passed in the Ninth Year of the Reign of King George the First, intituled An Act for continuing some Laws, and reviving others therein mentioned, for exempting Apothecaries from serving Parish and Ward Offices, and upon Juries, and relating to Jurors, and to the Payment of Seamen's Wages, and the Preservation of Naval Stores and Stores of War, and concerning the Militia and Trophy Money, and against clandestine running of uncustomed Goods, and for more effectual preventing Frauds relating to the Customs, and Frauds in mixing Silk with Stuffs to be exported.	As relates to Jurors and Juries.
3 Geo. 2. c. 25	Juries Act 1729	An Act passed in the Third Year of the Reign of King George the Second, intituled An Act for the better Regulation of Juries.	The whole act.
4 Geo. 2. c. 7	Juries Act 1730	An Act passed in the Fourth Year of the same Reign, intituled An Act to explain and amend an Act made in the Third Year of His Majesty's Reign, intituled An Act for the better Regulation of Juries, so far as the same relates to the County of Middlesex.	The whole act.
6 Geo. 2. c. 37	Perpetuation of Various Laws Act 1732	An Act passed in the Sixth Year of the same Reign, intituled An Act for making perpetual the several Acts therein mentioned, for the better Regulation of Juries; and for empowering the Justices of Sessions or Assizes for the Counties Pala- tine of Chester, Lancaster and Durham, to appoint a Special Jury in Manner therein mentioned; and for continuing the Act for regulating the Manufacture of Cloth in the West Riding of the County of York, (except a Clause therein contained); and for continuing an Act for the more effectual punishing wicked and evil disposed Persons going armed in Disguise, and for other Purposes therein mentioned; and to prevent the cutting or breaking down the Bank of any River, or any Sea Bank; and to prevent the malicious cut- ting of Hop Binds; and for continuing an Act made in the Thirteenth and Fourteenth Years of the Reign of King Charles the Second, for preventing Theft and Rapine upon the Northern Borders of England; and for reviving and continuing certain Clauses in Two other Acts made for the same Purpose.	As makes the said Acts of the Third and Fourth Years of the same Reign perpetual, and as relates to Special Juries.
24 Geo. 2. c. 18	Juries, etc. Act 1750	An Act passed in the Twenty fourth Year of the same Reign, intituled An Act for better Regulation of Trials by Jury, and for enlarging the Time for Trials by Nisi Prius in the County of Middlesex.	As relates to Special Juries and Writs of Venire Facias and Challenges of the Array. I.e., sections 1 to 4.
29 Geo. 2. c. 19	Juries Act 1756	An Act passed in the Twenty ninth Year of the same Reign, intituled An Act to empower Judges of Courts of Record in Cities and Towns Corporate, Liberties and Franchises, to set Fines on Persons who shall be summoned to serve upon Juries in such Courts, and shall neglect to attend.	The whole act.
13 Geo. 3. c. 51	Frivolous Suits Act 1772	An Act passed in the Thirteenth Year of the Reign of King George the Third, intituled An Act to discourage the Practice of commencing frivolous and vexatious Suits in his Majesty's Courts at Westminster, in Causes of Action arising within the Dominions of Wales, and for further regulating the Proceedings in the Courts of Great Sessions in Wales.	As relates to Special Juries.
1 & 2 Geo. 4. c. 46	Jurors at Assizes (England) Act 1821	An Act passed in the First and Second Years of His present Majesty's Reign, intituled An Act to regulate the Attendance of Jurors at the Assizes, in certain Cases.	The whole act.
5 Geo. 4. c. 106	Court of Great Sessions (Wales) Act 1824	An Act passed in the Fifth Year of His present Majesty's Reign, intituled An Act to enlarge and extend the Powers of the Judges of the several Courts of Great Sessions in Wales, and to amend the Laws relating to the same.	As relates to the Qualification of Jurors.

== See also ==
- Peel's Acts
- Statute Law Revision Act
