= List of acts of the Parliament of the United Kingdom from 1839 =

This is a complete list of acts of the Parliament of the United Kingdom for the year 1839.

Note that the first parliament of the United Kingdom was held in 1801; parliaments between 1707 and 1800 were either parliaments of Great Britain or of Ireland). For acts passed up until 1707, see the list of acts of the Parliament of England and the list of acts of the Parliament of Scotland. For acts passed from 1707 to 1800, see the list of acts of the Parliament of Great Britain. See also the list of acts of the Parliament of Ireland.

For acts of the devolved parliaments and assemblies in the United Kingdom, see the list of acts of the Scottish Parliament, the list of acts of the Northern Ireland Assembly, and the list of acts and measures of Senedd Cymru; see also the list of acts of the Parliament of Northern Ireland.

The number shown after each act's title is its chapter number. Acts passed before 1963 are cited using this number, preceded by the year(s) of the reign during which the relevant parliamentary session was held; thus the Union with Ireland Act 1800 is cited as "39 & 40 Geo. 3 c. 67", meaning the 67th act passed during the session that started in the 39th year of the reign of George III and which finished in the 40th year of that reign. Note that the modern convention is to use Arabic numerals in citations (thus "41 Geo. 3" rather than "41 Geo. III"). Acts of the last session of the Parliament of Great Britain and the first session of the Parliament of the United Kingdom are both cited as "41 Geo. 3". Acts passed from 1963 onwards are simply cited by calendar year and chapter number.

All modern acts have a short title, e.g. the Local Government Act 2003. Some earlier acts also have a short title given to them by later acts, such as by the Short Titles Act 1896.

== 2 & 3 Vict. ==
The second session of the 13th Parliament of the United Kingdom, which met from 5 February 1839 until 27 August 1839.

=== Public general acts ===
Short title	Citation	Royal assent
Long title
Poor Relief (Ireland) Act 1839 (repealed)	2 & 3 Vict. c. 1	15 March 1839
An Act to amend an Act of the First and Second Year of Her present Majesty (Note: Poor Relief (Ireland) Act 1838 (1 & 2 Vict. c. 56)) for the more effectual Relief of the destitute Poor in Ireland. (Repealed by Local Government (Ireland) Act 1898 (61 & 62 Vict. c. 37) and Statute Law Revision Act (Northern Ireland) 1954 (c. 35 (N.I.)))
Supply Act 1839 (repealed)	2 & 3 Vict. c. 2	15 March 1839
An Act to apply the Sum of Two Millions to the Service of the Year One thousand eight hundred and thirty-nine. (Repealed by Statute Law Revision Act 1874 (No. 2) (37 & 38 Vict. c. 96))
Tithe Arrears (Ireland) Act 1839 (repealed)	2 & 3 Vict. c. 3	27 March 1839
An Act to authorize the immediate Distribution of a Portion of the Fund applicable to the Relief of Persons entitled to certain Arrears of Tithe Compositions under an Act of the last Session of Parliament, (Note: Tithe Rentcharge (Ireland) Act 1838 (1 & 2 Vict. c. 109)) to abolish Compositions for Tithes in Ireland and to substitute Rent-charges in lieu thereof; and for other Purposes. (Repealed by Statute Law Revision Act 1874 (No. 2) (37 & 38 Vict. c. 96))
Estates of Duke of Wellington Act 1839 (repealed)	2 & 3 Vict. c. 4	27 March 1839
An Act to alter the Powers of jointuring contained in several Acts for purchasing and providing a Residence and Estates for the Duke of Wellington, and to settle certain Articles to go as Heirlooms with the said Estates. (Repealed by Wellington Estate Act 1972 (c. 1))
Mutiny Act 1839 (repealed)	2 & 3 Vict. c. 5	19 April 1839
An Act for punishing Mutiny and Desertion, and for the better Payment of the Army and their Quarters. (Repealed by Statute Law Revision Act 1874 (No. 2) (37 & 38 Vict. c. 96))
Supply Act 1839 (repealed)	2 & 3 Vict. c. 6	19 April 1839
An Act to apply the Sum of Eight Millions out of the Consolidated Fund to the Service of the Year One thousand eight hundred and thirty-nine. (Repealed by Statute Law Revision Act 1874 (No. 2) (37 & 38 Vict. c. 96))
Marine Mutiny Act 1839 (repealed)	2 & 3 Vict. c. 7	19 April 1839
An Act for the Regulation of Her Majesty's Royal Marine Forces while on shore. (Repealed by Statute Law Revision Act 1874 (No. 2) (37 & 38 Vict. c. 96))
Exchequer Bills Act 1839 (repealed)	2 & 3 Vict. c. 8	14 May 1839
An Act for raising the Sum of Thirteen Millions by Exchequer Bills, for the Service of the Year One thousand eight hundred and thirty-nine. (Repealed by Statute Law Revision Act 1874 (No. 2) (37 & 38 Vict. c. 96))
Episcopal Jurisdiction (England) Act 1839 (repealed)	2 & 3 Vict. c. 9	14 May 1839
An Act for repealing Part of an Act of the last Session of Parliament, intituled "An Act for suspending until the First Day of August One thousand eight hundred and thirty-nine, and to the End of the then Session of Parliament, the Appointment to certain Dignities and Offices in Cathedrals and Collegiate Churches, and to Sinecure Rectories." (Note: Ecclesiastical Appointments Suspension Act 1838 (1 & 2 Vict. c. 108)) (Repealed by Statute Law Revision Act 1874 (No. 2) (37 & 38 Vict. c. 96))
British Museum Act 1839 (repealed)	2 & 3 Vict. c. 10	4 June 1839
An Act for enabling the Trustees of the British Museum to purchase certain Houses and Ground, for the Enlargement of the Museum, and making a suitable Access thereto. (Repealed by British Museum Act 1963 (c. 24))
Judgments Act 1839 (repealed)	2 & 3 Vict. c. 11	4 June 1839
An Act for the better Protection of Purchasers against Judgments, Crown Debts, Lis pendens, and Fiats in Bankruptcy. (Repealed by Bankrupt Law Consolidation Act 1849 (12 & 13 Vict. c. 106), Statute Law Revision Act 1874 (No. 2) (37 & 38 Vict. c. 96), Land Charges Act 1900 (63 & 64 Vict. c. 26), Land Charges Act 1925 (15 & 16 Geo. 5. c. 22) and Statute Law Revision Act 1950 (14 Geo. 6. c. 6))
Printers and Publishers Act 1839 (repealed)	2 & 3 Vict. c. 12	4 June 1839
An Act to amend an Act of the Thirty-ninth Year of King George the Third, (Note: Unlawful Societies Act 1799 (39 Geo. 3. c. 79)) for the more effectual Suppression of Societies established for seditious and treasonable Purposes, and for preventing treasonable and seditious Practices, and to put an End to certain Proceedings now pending under the said Act. (Repealed by Newspapers, Printers, and Reading Rooms Repeal Act 1869 (32 & 33 Vict. c. 24))
Copyright of Designs (Printed Fabrics) Act 1839 (repealed)	2 & 3 Vict. c. 13	4 June 1839
An Act for extending the Copyright of Designs for Calico Printing to Designs for printing other woven Fabrics. (Repealed by Copyright of Designs Act 1842 (5 & 6 Vict. c. 100))
Appointments in Cathedral Churches Act 1839 (repealed)	2 & 3 Vict. c. 14	4 June 1839
An Act for removing Doubts as to the Appointment of a Dean of Exeter or of any other Cathedral Church. (Repealed by Statute Law Revision Act 1861 (24 & 25 Vict. c. 101))
Staffordshire Potteries Stipendiary Justice Act 1839 (repealed)	2 & 3 Vict. c. 15	4 June 1839
An Act to provide for the more effectual Execution of the Office of a Justice of the Peace within and adjoining to the District called The Staffordshire Potteries, and for Purposes connected therewith. (Repealed by Justices of the Peace Act 1968 (c. 69))
Court of Pleas of Durham Act 1839 (repealed)	2 & 3 Vict. c. 16	14 June 1839
An Act for improving the Practice and Proceedings of the Court of Pleas of the County Palatine of Durham and Sadberge. (Repealed by Civil Procedure Acts Repeal Act 1879 (42 & 43 Vict. c. 59))
Copyright of Designs Act 1839 (repealed)	2 & 3 Vict. c. 17	14 June 1839
An Act to secure to Proprietors of Designs for Articles of Manufacture the Copyright of such Designs for a limited Time. (Repealed by Copyright of Designs Act 1842 (5 & 6 Vict. c. 100))
Archbishops', etc., House of Residence Act 1839 (repealed)	2 & 3 Vict. c. 18	1 July 1839
An Act to enable Archbishops and Bishops to raise Money on Mortgage of their Sees, for the Purpose of building and otherwise providing fit Houses for their Residence. (Repealed by Ecclesiastical Houses of Residence Act 1842 (5 & 6 Vict. c. 26))
Waterford Hospital Act 1839	2 & 3 Vict. c. 19	1 July 1839
An Act to amend an Act of the Sixth and Seventh Years of His late Majesty King William the Fourth, (Note: Grand Jury (Ireland) Act 1836 (6 & 7 Will. 4. c. 116)) for consolidating the Laws relating to the Presentment of Public Money by Grand Juries in Ireland, so as to enable the Grand Jury of the County of Waterford to make Presentments on account of the Fever Hospital of the said County, although situate in the County of the City of Waterford.
Crown Land (Windsor) Act 1839 or the Stables at Windsor Castle Act 1839 (repealed)	2 & 3 Vict. c. 20	1 July 1839
An Act to authorize the Application of Part of the Land Revenues of the Crown for the Erection of Stables and Stable Offices contiguous to Windsor Castle. (Repealed by Statute Law (Repeals) Act 1993 (c. 50))
Sugar Duties Act 1839 (repealed)	2 & 3 Vict. c. 21	4 July 1839
An Act for granting to Her Majesty, until the Fifth Day of July One thousand eight hundred and forty, certain Duties on Sugar imported into the United Kingdom, for the Service of the Year One thousand eight hundred and thirty-nine. (Repealed by Statute Law Revision Act 1874 (No. 2) (37 & 38 Vict. c. 96))
Justices of Assize Act 1839 (repealed)	2 & 3 Vict. c. 22	4 July 1839
An Act to enable Justices of Assize on their Circuits to take Inquisition of all Pleas in the Court of Exchequer of Pleas which shall be brought before them without a Special Commission for that Purpose. (Repealed by Statute Law Revision Act 1874 (No. 2) (37 & 38 Vict. c. 96))
Duties on Paper Act 1839 (repealed)	2 & 3 Vict. c. 23	19 July 1839
An Act to consolidate and amend the Laws for collecting and securing the Duties of Excise on Paper made in the United Kingdom. (Repealed by Statute Law Revision Act 1874 (No. 2) (37 & 38 Vict. c. 96))
Duties on Bricks Act 1839 (repealed)	2 & 3 Vict. c. 24	19 July 1839
An Act to repeal the Duties and Drawbacks of Excise on Bricks, and to grant other Duties and Drawbacks in lieu thereof, and to consolidate and amend the Laws for collecting and paying the said Duties and Drawbacks. (Repealed by Brick Duties Repeal Act 1850 (13 & 14 Vict. c. 9))
Duties on Glass Act 1839 (repealed)	2 & 3 Vict. c. 25	19 July 1839
An Act to remove Doubts as to the charging certain of the Duties of Excise on Glass. (Repealed by Duties on Glass Act 1840 (3 & 4 Vict. c. 22))
Revival of Expired Laws, etc., Jamaica Act 1839 (repealed)	2 & 3 Vict. c. 26	19 July 1839
An Act to provide for the Enactment of certain Laws in the Island of Jamaica. (Repealed by Statute Law Revision Act 1874 (No. 2) (37 & 38 Vict. c. 96))
Borough Courts (England) Act 1839 (repealed)	2 & 3 Vict. c. 27	19 July 1839
An Act for regulating the Proceedings in the Borough Courts of England and Wales. (Repealed by Municipal Corporations Act 1882 (45 & 46 Vict. c. 50))
Borough Watch Rates Act 1839 (repealed)	2 & 3 Vict. c. 28	19 July 1839
An Act for more equally assessing and levying Watch Rates in certain Boroughs. (Repealed by Municipal Corporations Act 1882 (45 & 46 Vict. c. 50))
Bankruptcy Act 1839 (repealed)	2 & 3 Vict. c. 29	19 July 1839
An Act for the better Protection of Parties dealing with Persons liable to the Bankrupt Laws. (Repealed by Bankrupt Law Consolidation Act 1849 (12 & 13 Vict. c. 106))
Spiritual Duties Act 1839 (repealed)	2 & 3 Vict. c. 30	19 July 1839
An Act for apportioning the Spiritual Services of Parishes in which Two or more Spiritual Persons have Cure of Souls generally throughout the Parish. (Repealed by Statute Law (Repeals) Act 1977 (c. 18))
Turnpike Acts Continuance Act 1839 (repealed)	2 & 3 Vict. c. 31	29 July 1839
An Act to continue until the First Day of June One thousand eight hundred and forty-one, and to the End of the then Session of Parliament, the Local Turnpike Acts in England and Wake which expire with this or the ensuing Session of Parliament. (Repealed by Statute Law Revision Act 1874 (No. 2) (37 & 38 Vict. c. 96))
Soap Duties Act 1839 (repealed)	2 & 3 Vict. c. 32	29 July 1839
An Act to continue, until the End of the Session of Parliament next after the Thirty-first Day of May One thousand eight hundred and forty-one, certain of the Allowances of the Duty of Excise on Soap used in Manufactures. (Repealed by Statute Law Revision Act 1874 (No. 2) (37 & 38 Vict. c. 96))
Solicitors (Clerks) Act 1839 (repealed)	2 & 3 Vict. c. 33	29 July 1839
An Act to indemnify such Persons in the United Kingdom as have omitted to qualify themselves for Offices and Employments, and for extending the Time limited for those Purposes respectively until the Twenty-fifth Day of March One thousand eight hundred and forty; and for the Relief of Clerks to Attornies and Solicitors in certain Cases. (Repealed by Promissory Oaths Act 1871 (34 & 35 Vict. c. 48) and Solicitors Act 1932 (22 & 23 Geo. 5. c. 37))
Courts of Judicature, India Act 1839 (repealed)	2 & 3 Vict. c. 34	29 July 1839
An Act to confirm certain Rules and Orders of the Supreme Courts of Judicature at Fort William and Madras; and to empower the same Courts, and the Supreme Court of Judicature of Bombay, to make Rules and Orders concerning Pleadings. (Repealed by Statute Law Revision Act 1874 (No. 2) (37 & 38 Vict. c. 96))
Assessed Taxes, etc. Act 1839 (repealed)	2 & 3 Vict. c. 35	29 July 1839
An Act to continue, for One Year, Compositions for Assessed Taxes, and to alter the Period for the Expiration of Game Certificated, and for granting Licences to deal in Game. (Repealed by Revenue Act 1869 (32 & 33 Vict. c. 14) and Statute Law Revision Act 1874 (No. 2) (37 & 38 Vict. c. 96))
Court of Session Act 1839 (repealed)	2 & 3 Vict. c. 36	29 July 1839
An Act to regulate the Duties to be performed by the Judges in the Supreme Courts of Scotland, and to increase the Salaries of certain of the said Judges. (Repealed by Abolition of Feudal Tenure etc. (Scotland) Act 2000 (asp 5))
Usury Act 1839 (repealed)	2 & 3 Vict. c. 37	29 July 1839
An Act to amend, and extend until the First Day of January One thousand eight hundred and forty-two, the Provisions of an Act of the First Year of Her present Majesty (Note: Usury Act 1837 (7 Will. 4 & 1 Vict. c. 80)) for exempting certain Bills of Exchange and Promissory Notes from the Operation of the Laws relating to Usury. (Repealed by Statute Law Revision Act 1874 (No. 2) (37 & 38 Vict. c. 96))
Election Petitions Act 1839 (repealed)	2 & 3 Vict. c. 38	17 August 1839
An Act to amend the Jurisdiction for the Trial of Election Petitions. (Repealed by Controverted Elections Act 1841 (4 & 5 Vict. c. 58))
Insolvent Debtors Act 1839 (repealed)	2 & 3 Vict. c. 39	17 August 1839
An Act to amend an Act passed in the last Session of Parliament, (Note: Judgments Act 1838 (1 & 2 Vict. c. 110)) for abolishing Arrest on Mesne Process in Civil Actions except in certain Cases, for extending the Remedies of Creditors against the Property of Debtors, and for amending the Laws for the Relief of Insolvent Debtors in England. (Repealed by Bankruptcy Repeal and Insolvent Court Act 1869 (32 & 33 Vict. c. 83))
Highways Act 1839 (repealed)	2 & 3 Vict. c. 40	17 August 1839
An Act for procuring Returns relative to the Highways and Turnpike Roads in England and Wales. (Repealed by Statute Law Revision Act 1874 (No. 2) (37 & 38 Vict. c. 96))
Bankruptcy (Scotland) Act 1839 (repealed)	2 & 3 Vict. c. 41	17 August 1839
An Act for regulating the Sequestration of the Estates of Bankrupts in Scotland. (Repealed by Bankruptcy (Scotland) Act 1856 (19 & 20 Vict. c. 79))
Prisons (Scotland) Act 1839 (repealed)	2 & 3 Vict. c. 42	17 August 1839
An Act to improve Prisons and Prison Discipline in Scotland. (Repealed by Prisons (Scotland) Act 1860 (23 & 24 Vict. c. 105))
Militia Ballots Suspension Act 1839 (repealed)	2 & 3 Vict. c. 43	17 August 1839
An Act to suspend until the End of the next Session of Parliament the making of Lists and the Ballots and Enrolments for the Militia of the United Kingdom. (Repealed by Statute Law Revision Act 1874 (No. 2) (37 & 38 Vict. c. 96))
Timber Ships, British North America Act 1839 (repealed)	2 & 3 Vict. c. 44	17 August 1839
An Act to prevent, until the End of the next Session of Parliament, Ships clearing out from a British North American Port loading any Part of their Cargo of Timber upon Deck. (Repealed by Statute Law Revision Act 1874 (No. 2) (37 & 38 Vict. c. 96))
Highway (Railway Crossings) Act 1839	2 & 3 Vict. c. 45	17 August 1839
An Act to amend an Act of the Fifth and Sixth Years of the Reign of His late Majesty King William the Fourth (Note: Highway Act 1835 (5 & 6 Will. 4. c. 50)) relating to Highways.
Turnpike Tolls Act 1839 (repealed)	2 & 3 Vict. c. 46	17 August 1839
An Act to authorize the Trustees of Turnpike Roads to reduce the Scale of Tolls payable for Overweight. (Repealed by Statute Law (Repeals) Act 1981 (c. 19))
Metropolitan Police Act 1839	2 & 3 Vict. c. 47	17 August 1839
An Act for further improving the Police in and near the Metropolis.
Juries (Ireland) Act 1839 (repealed)	2 & 3 Vict. c. 48	17 August 1839
An Act to amend Two Acts, of the Third and Fourth (Note: Juries (Ireland) Act 1833 (3 & 4 Will. 4. c. 91)) and Fourth and Fifth Years (Note: Juries (Ireland) Act 1834 (4 & 5 Will. 4. c. 8)) of His late Majesty King William the Fourth, for consolidating and amending the Laws relative to Jurors and Juries in Ireland. (Repealed by Juries Act (Ireland) 1871 (34 & 35 Vict. c. 65))
Church Building Act 1839 (repealed)	2 & 3 Vict. c. 49	17 August 1839
An Act to make better Provision for the Assignment of Ecclesiastical Districts to Churches or Chapels augmented by the Governors of the Bounty of Queen Anne; and for other Purposes. (Repealed by Isle of Man (Church Building and New Parishes) Act 1897 (60 & 61 Vict. c. 33) and Endowments and Glebe Measure 1976 (No. 4))
Public Works (Ireland) Act 1839	2 & 3 Vict. c. 50	17 August 1839
An Act to extend and amend the Provisions of the Acts for the Extension and Promotion of Public Works in Ireland; and for the Recovery of Public Monies advanced for the Use of Counties, Parishes, and other Districts in Ireland on the Faith of Grand Jury Presentments and Parochial Assessments.
Pensions Act 1839 (repealed)	2 & 3 Vict. c. 51	17 August 1839
An Act to regulate the Payment and Assignment in certain Cases of Pensions granted for Service in Her Majesty's Army, Navy, Royal Marines, and Ordnance. (Repealed by Statute Law (Repeals) Act 1976 (c. 16))
Postage Act 1839 (repealed)	2 & 3 Vict. c. 52	17 August 1839
An Act for the further Regulation of the Duties on Postage until the Fifth Day of October One thousand eight hundred and forty. (Repealed by Post Office (Duties) Act 1840 (3 & 4 Vict. c. 96))
Lower Canada Government Act 1839 (repealed)	2 & 3 Vict. c. 53	17 August 1839
An Act to amend an Act of the last Session of Parliament (Note: Lower Canada Government Act 1838 (1 & 2 Vict. c. 9)) for making temporary Provision for the Government of Lower Canada. (Repealed by British North America Act 1840 (3 & 4 Vict. c. 35))
Custody of Infants Act 1839 (repealed)	2 & 3 Vict. c. 54	17 August 1839
An Act to amend the Law relating to the Custody of Infants. (Repealed by Custody of Infants Act 1873 (36 & 37 Vict. c. 12))
Ecclesiastical Preferments (England) Act 1839 (repealed)	2 & 3 Vict. c. 55	17 August 1839
An Act to suspend, until the First Day of August One thousand eight hundred and forty, certain Cathedral and other Ecclesiastical Preferments, and the Operation of the new Arrangement of Dioceses upon the existing Ecclesiastical Courts. (Repealed by Statute Law Revision Act 1874 (No. 2) (37 & 38 Vict. c. 96))
Prisons Act 1839 (repealed)	2 & 3 Vict. c. 56	17 August 1839
An Act for the better ordering of Prisons. (Repealed by Criminal Justice Act 1948 (11 & 12 Geo. 6. c. 58))
Slave Trade Suppression Act 1839 (repealed)	2 & 3 Vict. c. 57	17 August 1839
An Act to continue, until Six Months after the Commencement of the next Session of Parliament, an Act of the last Session of Parliament, (Note: Slave Trade Suppression (No. 2) Act 1838 (1 & 2 Vict. c. 102)) for authorizing Her Majesty to carry into immediate Execution by Orders in Council any Treaties for the Suppression of the Slave Trade. (Repealed by Statute Law Revision Act 1874 (No. 2) (37 & 38 Vict. c. 96))
Stannaries Act 1839 (repealed)	2 & 3 Vict. c. 58	17 August 1839
An Act to make further Provision for the Administration of Justice, and for improving the Practice and Proceedings, in the Courts of the Stannaries of Cornwall; and for the Prevention of Frauds by Workmen employed in Mines within the County of Cornwall. (Repealed by Stannaries Court (Abolition) Act 1896 (59 & 60 Vict. c. 45))
Militia Officers Act 1839 (repealed)	2 & 3 Vict. c. 59	17 August 1839
An Act for taking away the Exemption, except in certain Cases, of Officers of the Militia to serve as Sheriff. (Repealed by Militia (Voluntary Enlistment) Act 1875 (38 & 39 Vict. c. 69))
Debts Recovery Act 1839 (repealed)	2 & 3 Vict. c. 60	17 August 1839
An Act to explain and extend the Provisions of an Act passed in the First Year of His late Majesty King William the Fourth, intituled "An Act for consolidating and amending the Laws for facilitating the Payment of Debts out of Real Estate." (Note: Debts Recovery Act 1830 (11 Geo. 4 & 1 Will. 4. c. 47)) (Repealed for England and Wales by Administration of Estates Act 1925 (15 & 16 Geo. 5. c. 23) and for Northern Ireland by Administration of Estates Act (Northern Ireland) 1955 (c. 24 (N.I.)))
Shannon Navigation Act 1839	2 & 3 Vict. c. 61	17 August 1839
An Act for the Improvement of the Navigation of the River Shannon.
Tithe Act 1839	2 & 3 Vict. c. 62	17 August 1839
An Act to explain and amend the Acts for the commutation of tithes in England and Wales.
Duties on Soap Act 1839 (repealed)	2 & 3 Vict. c. 63	24 August 1839
An Act to remove Doubts as to the charging the Duty of Excise on Hard Soap, until the Eleventh Day of October One thousand eight hundred and forty. (Repealed by Duties on Soap Act 1840 (3 & 4 Vict. c. 49))
Militia Pay Act 1839 (repealed)	2 & 3 Vict. c. 64	24 August 1839
An Act to defray the Charge of the Pay, Clothing, and contingent and other Expences} of the disembodied Militia in Great Britain and Ireland; and to grant Allowances in certain Cases to Subaltern Officers, Adjutants, Paymasters, Quartermasters, Surgeons, Assistant Surgeons, Surgeons Mates, and Serjeant Mayors of the Militia, until the First Day of July One thousand eight hundred and forty. (Repealed by Statute Law Revision Act 1874 (No. 2) (37 & 38 Vict. c. 96))
Rogue Money (Scotland) Act 1839 (repealed)	2 & 3 Vict. c. 65	24 August 1839
An Act to amend the Mode of assessing the Rogue Money in Scotland, and to extend the Purposes of such Assessment. (Repealed by Police (Scotland) Act 1857 (20 & 21 Vict. c. 72))
Duty on Stage Carriages Act 1839 (repealed)	2 & 3 Vict. c. 66	24 August 1839
An Act to reduce certain of the Duties now payable on Stage Carriages. (Repealed by Revenue Act 1869 (32 & 33 Vict. c. 14))
Patents Act 1839 (repealed)	2 & 3 Vict. c. 67	24 August 1839
An Act to amend an Act of the Fifth and Sixth Years of the Reign of King William the Fourth, intituled "An Act to amend the Law touching Letters Patent for Inventions." (Note: Letters Patent for Inventions Act 1835 (5 & 6 Will. 4. c. 83)) (Repealed by Patents, Designs, and Trade Marks Act 1883 (46 & 47 Vict. c. 57))
Joint Stock Banking Companies Act 1839 (repealed)	2 & 3 Vict. c. 68	24 August 1839
An Act to continue, until the Thirty-first Day of August One thousand eight hundred and forty, an Act of the First and Second Years of Her present Majesty, (Note: Joint Stock Banks Act 1838 (1 & 2 Vict. c. 96)) relating to legal Proceedings by certain Joint Stock Banking Companies against their own Members, and by such Members against the Companies. (Repealed by Statute Law Revision Act 1874 (No. 2) (37 & 38 Vict. c. 96))
Judges' Lodgings Act 1839 (repealed)	2 & 3 Vict. c. 69	24 August 1839
An Act to authorize the Purchase or building of Lodgings for the Judges of Assize on their Circuits. (Repealed by Courts Act 1971 (c. 23))
New South Wales and Van Diemen's Land Act 1839 (repealed)	2 & 3 Vict. c. 70	24 August 1839
An Act to amend an Act of the Ninth Year of King George the Fourth, (Note: Australian Courts Act 1828 (9 Geo. 4. c. 83)) to provide for the Administration of Justice in New South Wales and Van Diemen's Land, and for the more effectual Government thereof, and for other Purposes relating thereto; and to continue the same until the Thirty-first Day of December One thousand eight hundred and forty, and thenceforward to the End of the then next Session of Pariiament. (Repealed by Statute Law Revision Act 1875 (38 & 39 Vict. c. 66))
Metropolitan Police Courts Act 1839	2 & 3 Vict. c. 71	24 August 1839
An Act for regulating the Police Courts in the Metropolis.
Assizes Act 1839 (repealed)	2 & 3 Vict. c. 72	24 August 1839
An Act for enabling Justices of Assize and Nisi Prius, Oyer and Terminer, and Gaol Delivery, to hold Courts for Counties at large in adjoining Counties of Cities and Towns, and conversely. (Repealed by Supreme Court of Judicature (Consolidation) Act 1925 (15 & 16 Geo. 5. c. 49))
Slave Trade Suppression (No. 2) Act 1839 (repealed)	2 & 3 Vict. c. 73	24 August 1839
An Act for the Suppression of the Slave Trade. (Repealed by Slave Trade Act 1873 (36 & 37 Vict. c. 88))
Unlawful Societies (Ireland) Act 1839 (repealed)	2 & 3 Vict. c. 74	24 August 1839
An Act to extend and render more effectual for Five Years an Act passed in the Fourth Year of His late Majesty George the Fourth, (Note: Unlawful Oaths (Ireland) Act 1823 (4 Geo. 4. c. 87)) to amend an Act passed in the Fiftieth Year of His Majesty George the Third, (Note: Unlawful Oaths (Ireland) Act 1810 (50 Geo. 3. c. 102)) for preventing the administering and taking unlawful Oaths in Ireland. (Repealed by Statute Law Revision (No. 2) Act 1888 (51 & 52 Vict. c. 57))
Constabulary (Ireland) Act 1839 (repealed)	2 & 3 Vict. c. 75	24 August 1839
An Act for the better Regulation of the Constabulary Force in Ireland, (Repealed by Police (Northern Ireland) Act 1998 (c. 32))
Municipal Corporations (Ireland) Act 1839 (repealed)	2 & 3 Vict. c. 76	24 August 1839
An Act to restrain the Alienation of Corporate Property in certain Towns in Ireland until the First Day of September One thousand eight hundred and forty. (Repealed by Statute Law Revision Act 1874 (No. 2) (37 & 38 Vict. c. 96))
Assaults (Ireland) Act 1839 (repealed)	2 & 3 Vict. c. 77	24 August 1839
An Act for the better Prevention and Punishment of Assaults in Ireland for Five Years. (Repealed by Statute Law Revision Act 1874 (No. 2) (37 & 38 Vict. c. 96))
Dublin Police Act 1839 (repealed)	2 & 3 Vict. c. 78	24 August 1839
An Act to make further Provisions relating to the Police in the District of Dublin Metropolis. (Repealed by Statute Law (Repeals) Act 2013 (c. 2))
Sale of Spirits, etc. (Ireland) Act 1839 (repealed)	2 & 3 Vict. c. 79	24 August 1839
An Act for the better Prevention of the Sale of Spirits by unlicensed Persons in Ireland. (Repealed by Spirits (Ireland) Act 1854 (17 & 18 Vict. c. 89))
London Roads Act 1839	2 & 3 Vict. c. 80	24 August 1839
An Act to empower the Commissioners of Her Majesty's Woods, Forests, Land Revenues, Works, and Buildings to raise a Sum of Money for making additional Thoroughfares in the Metropolis.
Highway Rates Act 1839 (repealed)	2 & 3 Vict. c. 81	24 August 1839
An Act to authorize for One Year, and from thence to the End of the then next Session of Parliament, the Application of a Portion of the Highway Rates to Turnpike Roads in certain Cases. (Repealed by Statute Law Revision Act 1874 (No. 2) (37 & 38 Vict. c. 96))
Counties (Detached Parts) Act 1839 (repealed)	2 & 3 Vict. c. 82	26 August 1839
An Act for the better Administration of Justice in detached Parts of Counties. (Repealed by Statute Law Revision Act 1874 (No. 2) (37 & 38 Vict. c. 96) and Statute Law Revision Act 1950 (14 Geo. 6. c. 6))
Poor Law Commission Act 1839 (repealed)	2 & 3 Vict. c. 83	26 August 1839
An Act to continue the Poor Law Commission until the Fourteenth Day of August One thousand eight hundred and forty, and thenceforth until the End of the then next Session of Parliament. (Repealed by Statute Law Revision Act 1874 (No. 2) (37 & 38 Vict. c. 96))
Poor Rate Act 1839 (repealed)	2 & 3 Vict. c. 84	26 August 1839
An Act to amend the Laws relating to the Assessment and Collection of Rates for the Relief of the Poor. (Repealed by Local Government Act 1966 (c. 42))
Bastard Children Act 1839 (repealed)	2 & 3 Vict. c. 85	26 August 1839
An Act to enable Justices of the Peace in Petty Sessions to make Orders for the Support of Bastard Children. (Repealed by Statute Law Revision Act 1874 (No. 2) (37 & 38 Vict. c. 96))
Bankruptcy (Ireland) Act 1839 (repealed)	2 & 3 Vict. c. 86	26 August 1839
An Act to amend an Act passed in the Session holden in the Sixth Year of His late Majesty King William the Fourth, (Note: Bankruptcy (Ireland) Act 1836 (6 & 7 Will. 4. c. 14)) for amending the Laws relating to Bankrupts in Ireland. (Repealed by Irish Bankrupt and Insolvent Act 1857 (20 & 21 Vict. c. 60))
Manchester Police Act 1839 (repealed)	2 & 3 Vict. c. 87	26 August 1839
An Act for improving the Police in Manchester for Two Years, and from thence until the End of the then next Session of Parliament. (Repealed by Statute Law Revision Act 1874 (No. 2) (37 & 38 Vict. c. 96))
Birmingham Police Act 1839 (repealed)	2 & 3 Vict. c. 88	26 August 1839
An Act for improving the Police in Birmingham for Two Years, and from thence until the End of the then next Session of Parliament. (Repealed by Statute Law Revision Act 1874 (No. 2) (37 & 38 Vict. c. 96))
Appropriation Act 1839 (repealed)	2 & 3 Vict. c. 89	27 August 1839
An Act to apply a Sum out of the Consolidated Fund, and the Surplus of Ways and Means, to the Service of the Year One thousand eight hundred and thirty-nine, and to appropriate the Supplies granted in this Session of Parliament. (Repealed by Statute Law Revision Act 1874 (No. 2) (37 & 38 Vict. c. 96))
Exchequer Act 1839 (repealed)	2 & 3 Vict. c. 90	27 August 1839
An Act for raising the Sum of Twelve millions twenty-six thousand and fifty Pounds by Exchequer Bills, for the Service of the Year One thousand eight hundred and thirty-nine. (Repealed by Statute Law Revision Act 1874 (No. 2) (37 & 38 Vict. c. 96))
Bank of Ireland Advances Act 1839 (repealed)	2 & 3 Vict. c. 91	27 August 1839
An Act to continue, until the First Day of January One thousand eight hundred and forty-one, an Act of the last Session of Parliament (Note: Bank of Ireland Advances Act 1838 (1 & 2 Vict. c. 81)) relating to the Bank of Ireland. (Repealed by National Debt Act 1840 (3 & 4 Vict. c. 75))
Fines and Penalties (Ireland) Act 1839 (repealed)	2 & 3 Vict. c. 92	27 August 1839
An Act to explain and amend an Act of the First and Second Years of Her present Majesty, (Note: Fines, etc. (Ireland) Act 1838 (1 & 2 Vict. c. 99)) so far as relates to Fines and Penalties levied under the Revenue Laws in Ireland. (Repealed by Statute Law Revision Act 1874 (No. 2) (37 & 38 Vict. c. 96))
County Police Act 1839 or the Rural Police Act 1839 or the Rural Constabularies Act 1839 (repealed)	2 & 3 Vict. c. 93	27 August 1839
An Act for the Establishment of County and District Constables by the Authority of the Justices of the Peace. (Repealed by Police Act 1964 (c. 48))
Duke of Marlborough's Annuity Act 1839 (repealed)	2 & 3 Vict. c. 94	27 August 1839
An Act to exempt the Parliamentary Grant to the Heirs of John Duke of Marlborough from the Payment of the Duty of One Shilling and Sixpence in the Pound. (Repealed by Statute Law Revision (No. 2) Act 1893 (56 & 57 Vict. c. 54))
Bolton Police Act 1839 (repealed)	2 & 3 Vict. c. 95	27 August 1839
An Act for improving the Police in Bolton for Two Years, and from thence until the End of the then next Session of Parliament. (Repealed by Statute Law Revision Act 1874 (No. 2) (37 & 38 Vict. c. 96))
Fisheries, Convention with France Act 1839 (repealed)	2 & 3 Vict. c. 96	27 August 1839
An Act to authorize Her Majesty, until Six Months after the Commencement of the next Session of Parliament, to carry into effect a Convention between Her Majesty and the King of the French relative to the Fisheries on the Coasts of the British Islands and of France. (Repealed by Statute Law Revision Act 1874 (No. 2) (37 & 38 Vict. c. 96))
National Debt Act 1839 (repealed)	2 & 3 Vict. c. 97	27 August 1839
An Act for funding Exchequer Bills. (Repealed by Statute Law Revision Act 1870 (33 & 34 Vict. c. 69))

=== Local acts ===
Short title	Citation	Royal assent
Long title
Preston and Wyre Railway and Harbour Act 1839	2 & 3 Vict. c. i	27 March 1839
An Act to amend the several Acts relating to the Preston and Wyre Railway and Harbour Company.
Manchester Improvement Act 1839 (repealed)	2 & 3 Vict. c. ii	19 April 1839
An Act for effecting Improvements in the Streets and other Places within and contiguous to the Town of Manchester. (Repealed by Manchester General Improvement Act 1851 (14 & 15 Vict. c. cxix))
Preston Gas Light Company Act 1839 (repealed)	2 & 3 Vict. c. iii	19 April 1839
An Act for incorporating "The Preston Gas Light Company," and for better lighting with Gas or otherwise the Parliamentary Borough of Preston, and the Townships and Places therein mentioned, in the County of Lancaster. (Repealed by Preston Gas Act 1853 (16 & 17 Vict. c. xiii))
Road from Epsom to Tooting Act 1839 (repealed)	2 & 3 Vict. c. iv	19 April 1839
An Act for repairing the Road from Epsom to Tooting, and other Roads communicating therewith, all in the County of Surrey. (Repealed by Annual Turnpike Acts Continuance Act 1869 (32 & 33 Vict. c. 90))
General Cemetery Company Act 1839	2 & 3 Vict. c. v	14 May 1839
An Act for enabling the General Cemetery Company to raise a further Sum of Money; and for amending the Act (Note: Metropolitan General Cemetery Act 1832 (2 & 3 Will. 4. c. cx)) relating to the said Cemetery.
Newark Gas Act 1839 (repealed)	2 & 3 Vict. c. vi	14 May 1839
An Act for the better lighting and supplying the Borough of Newark in the County of Nottingham, and the Neighbourhood thereof, with Gas. (Repealed by Newark Gas Act 1866 (29 & 30 Vict. c. xxxi))
Holmfirth Gas Act 1839 (repealed)	2 & 3 Vict. c. vii	14 May 1839
An Act for lighting with Gas the Town of Holmfirth and the Neighbourhood thereof, in the West Riding of the County of York. (Repealed by Huddersfield Gas Order 1939 (SR&O 1939/801))
Bury Markets and Fairs Act 1839	2 & 3 Vict. c. viii	14 May 1839
An Act for providing a Market Place, and for regulating the Markets and Fairs, in the Town and Borough of Bury in the County Palatine of Lancaster.
Cambridge Gaol Act 1839 (repealed)	2 & 3 Vict. c. ix	14 May 1839
An Act to amend an Act of the Seventh and Eighth of King George the Fourth, (Note: Cambridge Gaol Act 1827 (7 & 8 Geo. 4. c. cxi)) for building a new Gaol for the Town of Cambridge, and for making further Provision for Payment of Creditors under the said Act. (Repealed by Statute Law (Repeals) Act 2008 (c. 12))
Timberland and Timberland Thorpe (Lincolnshire) Drainage Act 1839	2 & 3 Vict. c. x	14 May 1839
An Act for the more effectual Drainage of certain Lands called the Fen and Dales of Timberland and Timberland Thorpe, in the Parish of Timberland in the County of Lincoln.
Rhymney Church Act 1839	2 & 3 Vict. c. xi	14 May 1839
An Act to enable the Rhymney Iron Company to erect and endow a Church in the Parish of Bedwelty the County of Monmouth.
Hayle and Redruth Turnpike Act 1839	2 & 3 Vict. c. xii	14 May 1839
An Act for making a Turnpike Road from the Town of Redruth in the County of County to and through the Village of Hayle in the Parish of Phillack in the same County.
Road from Northampton to Newport Pagnell Act 1839 (repealed)	2 & 3 Vict. c. xiii	14 May 1839
An Act for repairing the Road from Cotton End near the Town of Northampton to Newport Pagnell in the County of Buckingham. (Repealed by Annual Turnpike Acts Continuance Act 1869 (32 & 33 Vict. c. 90))
New Cross Turnpike Roads Amendment Act 1839	2 & 3 Vict. c. xiv	14 May 1839
An Act to extend, alter, and amend the Powers and Provisions of an Act passed in the Seventh Year of the Reign of His late Majesty King George the Fourth, (Note: New Cross Turnpike Roads Act 1826 (7 Geo. 4. c. cxxv)) relating to the New Cross Turnpike Roads in the Counties of Kent and Surrey.
Worksop and Kelham, and Debdale Hill and South Muskham Roads Act 1839	2 & 3 Vict. c. xv	14 May 1839
An Act for repairing and maintaining the Road from Worksop to the Turnpike Road at Kelham, and from Debdale Hill to the Great Northern Road at South Muskham, in the County of Nottingham.
Aberbrothwick Harbour Act 1839	2 & 3 Vict. c. xvi	14 May 1839
An Act for extending, improving, regulating, and managing the Harbour of the Royal Burgh of Aberbrothwick in the County of Forfar.
Leeds Soke Mills Act 1839	2 & 3 Vict. c. xvii	14 May 1839
An Act for discharging the Inhabitants of the Manor of Leeds in the Township and Parish of Leeds in the County of York from the Custom of grinding Com, Grain, and Malt at certain Water Cornmills in the said Manor; and for making Compensation to the Proprietor of the said Mills.
London and Croydon Railway Act 1839	2 & 3 Vict. c. xviii	4 June 1839
An Act to amend and enlarge the Powers and Provisions of the several Acts relating to the London and Croydon Railway.
London and Greenwich Railway Act 1839	2 & 3 Vict. c. xix	4 June 1839
An Act for granting further Powers to the London and Greenwich Railway Company.
Road from Padbrooke Bridge to Hazel-Stone (Devon) Act 1839	2 & 3 Vict. c. xx	4 June 1839
An Act for more effectually repairing and maintaining the Road from Padbrooke Bridge in the Parish of Cullompton to Hazel-Stone in the Parish of Broadclist, all in the County of Devon.
Perth Port and Harbour and Tay Navigation Act 1839 (repealed)	2 & 3 Vict. c. xxi	4 June 1839
An Act to alter, amend, and enlarge the Powers and Provisions of Two several Acts of the Eleventh Year of the Reign of King George the Fourth and First Year of the Reign of King William the Fourth, (Note: Perth Harbour and Tay Navigation Act 1830 (11 Geo. 4 & 1 Will. 4. c. cxxi)) and Fourth and Fifth Year of the Reign of King William the Fourth, (Note: Perth Port and Harbour and Tay Navigation Act 1834 (4 & 5 Will. 4. c. lxvii)) for improving the Port and Harbour of Perth, and the Navigation of the River Tay to the said City. (Repealed by Perth Burgh and Harbour (No. 2) Act 1856 (19 & 20 Vict. c. cxxxviii))
Wearmouth Bridge and Tyne Bridge Road Act 1839 (repealed)	2 & 3 Vict. c. xxii	4 June 1839
An Act for more effectually repairing and improving the Road from Wearmouth Bridge to Tyne Bridge, with a Branch from the said Road to the Town of South Shields, all in the County of Durham. (Repealed by Annual Turnpike Acts Continuance Act 1870 (33 & 34 Vict. c. 73))
Rugby and Warwick Road Act 1839	2 & 3 Vict. c. xxiii	4 June 1839
An Act for repairing and maintaining the Road from the Town of Rugby to the Borough of Warwick, all in the County of Warwick.
Rochdale Water Act 1839	2 & 3 Vict. c. xxiv	4 June 1839
An Act to consolidate, amend, enlarge, and extend the Powers and Provisions of Two Acts of King George the Third, (Note: Rochdale Water Act 1809 (49 Geo. 3. c. xxv)) (Note: Rochdale Water Act 1816 (56 Geo. 3. c. lxi)) for better supplying the Town and Neighbourhood of Rochdale with Water.
Cheltenham Waterworks Act 1839	2 & 3 Vict. c. xxv	4 June 1839
An Act for enabling the Cheltenham Waterworks Company to enlarge and extend their Works, and for amending the Act (Note: Cheltenham Water Act 1824 (5 Geo. 4. c. cxxxii)) relating thereto.
Herefordshire and Gloucestershire Canal Act 1839	2 & 3 Vict. c. xxvi	4 June 1839
An Act for enabling the Company of Proprietors of the Herefordshire and Gloucestershire Canal Navigation to raise a further Sum of Money, and for amending the Acts relating thereto.
Great Western Railway Act 1839	2 & 3 Vict. c. xxvii	4 June 1839
An Act to amend the Acts relating to "The Great Western Railway;" and to raise a further Sum of Money for the Purposes of the said Undertaking.
London and South Western Railway (Portsmouth Branch Railway) Act 1839	2 & 3 Vict. c. xxviii	4 June 1839
An Act to amend the Acts relating to the London and Southampton Railway Company, hereafter to be called "The London and South-western Railway Company," and to make a Branch Railway to the Port of Portsmouth.
Clitheroe, Blackburn and Mellor Brook Roads Act 1839	2 & 3 Vict. c. xxix	14 June 1839
An Act for repairing, improving, and maintaining the Roads from Clitheroe, through Whalley, to Blackburn and Mellor Brook in the County Palatine of Lancaster, and for making a new Piece of Road to communicate therewith.
Morville and Shipton Turnpike Road (Salop.) Act 1839	2 & 3 Vict. c. xxx	14 June 1839
An Act for making a Turnpike Road from Morville to Shipton, with a Branch to Brockton, and another Branch from Brockton to Easthope's Cross, all in the County of Salop.
Road from Bury to Blackburn and Branches Act 1839	2 & 3 Vict. c. xxxi	14 June 1839
An Act for repairing, improving, and maintaining the Roads from Bury, through Haslingden, to Blackburn and Whalley, and other Roads communicating therewith, in the County Palatine of Lancaster.
Road from Leeds to Harrogate Act 1839	2 & 3 Vict. c. xxxii	14 June 1839
An Act for repairing and maintaining the Road from Leeds, through Harewood, to the South-west Corner of the Inclosures of Harrogate in the West Riding of the County of York.
Dover, Deal and Sandwich Road Act 1839	2 & 3 Vict. c. xxxiii	14 June 1839
An Act for repairing the Road from Dover in the County of Kent, through Deal, to Sandwich in the said County.
River Witham Drainage Commission Act 1839	2 & 3 Vict. c. xxxiv	14 June 1839
An Act to enable the General Commissioners for Drainage by the River Witham in the County of Lincoln to sue and be sued in the Name or Names of any One of the said Commissioners or of their Clerk or Clerks for the Time being.
Rishworth Reservoirs Act 1839 (repealed)	2 & 3 Vict. c. xxxv	14 June 1839
An Act for making and maintaining certain Reservoirs in the Township of Rishworth in the Parish of Halifax in the West Riding of the County of York. (Repealed by Wakefield Corporation Waterworks Act 1880 (43 & 44 Vict. c. lvii))
Eyemouth Harbour Act 1839 (repealed)	2 & 3 Vict. c. xxxvi	14 June 1839
An Act for more effectually repairing, improving, and maintaining the Harbour of Eyemouth in the County of Berwick. (Repealed by Pier and Harbour Orders Confirmation (No. 2) Act 1920 (10 & 11 Geo. 5. c. cxxi))
Parrett Navigation Act 1839	2 & 3 Vict. c. xxxvii	14 June 1839
An Act for granting further Powers to the Company of Proprietors of the Parrett Navigation.
Brighton Gas Act 1839	2 & 3 Vict. c. xxxviii	14 June 1839
An Act for better lighting with Gas the Town of Brighton, and the several Places therein mentioned, in the County of Sussex.
London and Birmingham Railway Act 1839 (repealed)	2 & 3 Vict. c. xxxix	14 June 1839
An Act to enable the London and Birmingham Railway Company to raise a further Sum of Money. (Repealed by London and North Western Railway Act 1846 (9 & 10 Vict. c. cciv))
Great North of England Railway Act 1839	2 & 3 Vict. c. xl	14 June 1839
An Act for amending and enlarging the Provisions of the several Acts relating to the Great North of England Railway Company, and for other Purposes relating thereto.
Liverpool and Manchester Railway Act 1839	2 & 3 Vict. c. xli	14 June 1839
An Act for enabling the Liverpool and Manchester Railway Company to extend the Line of the said Railway, and for amending and enlarging the Powers and Provisions of the several Acts relating to such Railway.
South Eastern Railway Act 1839	2 & 3 Vict. c. xlii	14 June 1839
An Act to amend the Acts relating to the South-eastern Railway.
Perth Improvement Act 1839	2 & 3 Vict. c. xliii	14 June 1839
An Act for more effectually paving the Streets of the City of Perth; for the better lighting, watching, and cleansing the said City and Suburbs thereof; for maintaining and regulating the Police of the same, and for other Purposes relating thereto.
Staffordshire Potteries Improvement and Police Act 1839 (repealed)	2 & 3 Vict. c. xliv	14 June 1839
An Act for establishing an effective Police in Places within or adjoining to the District called the Staffordshire Potteries, and for improving and cleansing the same, and better lighting Parts thereof. (Repealed by Staffordshire Act 1983 (c. xviii))
Basingstoke, Odiham and Alton Roads Act 1839 (repealed)	2 & 3 Vict. c. xlv	14 June 1839
An Act for repairing several Roads leading to the Towns of Basingstoke, Odiham, and Alton, in the County of Southampton. and for making several Deviations in the Line of the said Roads. (Repealed by Annual Turnpike Acts Continuance Act 1871 (34 & 35 Vict. c. 115))
St. Leonard's (Sussex) and Sedlescombe Turnpike Road Amendment Act 1839	2 & 3 Vict. c. xlvi	1 July 1839
An Act to amend an Act passed in the Sixth Year of His late Majesty King William the Fourth, (Note: Whatlington and Ewhurst Turnpike Road (Sussex) Act 1836 (6 & 7 Will. 4. c. xix)) for making a Turnpike Road from Saint Leonards and Saint Mary Magdalen to the Royal Oak Inn at Whatlington, and through Sedlescomb to Cripp's Corner in the Parish of Ewhurst, in the County of Sussex.
Road from Edenfield Chapel to Little Bolton (Lancashire) Act 1839 (repealed)	2 & 3 Vict. c. xlvii	1 July 1839
An Act for more effectually repairing and improving the Road from Edenfield Chapel to Little Bolton, and certain Branch Roads connected therewith, all in the County Palatine of Lancaster. (Repealed by Edenfield Chapel and Little Bolton Turnpike Trusts Continuance Act 1861 (24 & 25 Vict. c. i))
River Leven Bridge Act 1839	2 & 3 Vict. c. xlviii	1 July 1839
An Act for building a Bridge over the River Leven in the County of Fife, and otherwise improving the Road from Boreland Loan to Sconie Bridge.
Southmolton Roads (Devon) Act 1839	2 & 3 Vict. c. xlix	1 July 1839
An Act for making and repairing several Roads leading to and from the Town of Southmolton in the County of Devon.
Glasgow and Renfrew Road Act 1839 (repealed)	2 & 3 Vict. c. l	1 July 1839
An Act for more effectually maintaining and repairing the Road leading from the West Side of the Entry to the New or Jamaica Street Bridge of Glasgow, by or near Parkhouse, to the East End of the Bridge at Renfrew. (Repealed by Glasgow, Renfrew and Three Mile House Turnpike Roads Act 1872 (35 & 36 Vict. c. xxv))
Edinburgh, Leith and Newhaven Railway Act 1839	2 & 3 Vict. c. li	1 July 1839
An Act to alter, amend, and enlarge the Powers and Provisions of an Act passed in the Seventh Year of the Reign of His Majesty King William the Fourth, intituled "An Act for making and maintaining a Railway or Railways from the City of Edinburgh to Leith, and to the Shore of the Frith of Forth at or near to Newhaven and Trinity, all in the County of Edinburgh;" (Note: Edinburgh, Leith and Granton Railway Act 1836 (6 & 7 Will. 4. c. cxxxi)) and to alter and vary the Lines and Levels of the Railways thereby authorized to be made; and for other Purposes relating to the said Undertaking.
Croydon, Merstham and Godstone Iron Railway Dissolution Act 1839	2 & 3 Vict. c. lii	1 July 1839
An Act for dissolving the Croydon, Merstham, and Godstone Iron Railway Company.
North Midland Railway Act 1839 (repealed)	2 & 3 Vict. c. liii	1 July 1839
An Act to alter the Line of the North Midland Railway, and to amend the Acts relating thereto. (Repealed by Midland Railway Consolidation Act 1844 (7 & 8 Vict. c. xviii))
Preston and Wyre Railway and Harbour and Preston and Wyre Dock Consolidation Act 1839	2 & 3 Vict. c. liv	1 July 1839
An Act to amend the several Acts relating to the Preston and Wyre Railway and Harbour Company and the Preston and Wyre Dock Company, and to consolidate the said Companies.
Manchester and Leeds Railway Act 1839	2 & 3 Vict. c. lv	1 July 1839
An Act for extending and for altering the Line of the Manchester and Leeds Railway, and for making Branches therefrom; and for amending the Acts relating thereto.
Bristol and Gloucestershire Railway Act 1839	2 & 3 Vict. c. lvi	1 July 1839
An Act for altering and extending the Line of the Bristol and Gloucestershire Railway and for amending the Acts relating thereto.
Slamannan Railway Act 1839	2 & 3 Vict. c. lvii	1 July 1839
An Act for enabling the Slamannan Railway Company to raise a farther Sum of Money.
Wishaw and Coltness Railway Act 1839	2 & 3 Vict. c. lviii	1 July 1839
An Act to enable the Wishaw and Coltness Railway Company to raise a further Sum of Money; and to amend the Acts relating to the said Undertaking.
Ballochney Railway Act 1839	2 & 3 Vict. c. lix	1 July 1839
An Act to enable the Ballochney Railway Company to raise a further Sum of Money; and to amend the Acts relating to the said Undertaking.
Tyne Docks Act 1839	2 & 3 Vict. c. lx	1 July 1839
An Act for making Wet Docks and other Works at and near to Jarrow Slake within the Port of Newcastle upon Tyne, and in the County of Durham, to be called "The Tyne Docks."
Birmingham Canal Navigations Act 1839	2 & 3 Vict. c. lxi	1 July 1839
An Act for enabling the Company of Proprietors of the Birmingham Canal Navigations to make a new Cut; and for extending and altering some of the Provisions of their present Act. (Note: Birmingham Canal Navigations Act 1835 (5 & 6 Will. 4. c. xxxiv))
Norwich Public Works, Bridges and Roads Act 1839 (repealed)	2 & 3 Vict. c. lxii	1 July 1839
An Act to repeal so much of an Act passed in the Twelfth Year of the Reign of His Majesty King George the First, for repairing the Walls, Gates, and other public Works in the City of Norwich, and several Bridges in and near the said City, and for amending the Roads therein mentioned, as relates to the Application of the Tolls and Duties thereby authorized to be raised; and to provide a new Mode of Application thereof. (Repealed by Norwich City Council Act 1984 (c. xxiii))
Bradford (Wiltshire) Improvement Act 1839	2 & 3 Vict. c. lxiii	1 July 1839
An Act for paving, lighting, watching, and improving the Town of Bradford in the County of Wilts.
Aberdeen Market Act 1839 (repealed)	2 & 3 Vict. c. lxiv	1 July 1839
An Act for erecting, establishing, and maintaining a new Market in the City of Aberdeen, and for providing suitable Approaches thereto. (Repealed by Aberdeen Market Company Order Confirmation Act 1912 (2 & 3 Geo. 5. c. xxi))
Fraserburgh Harbour Act 1839 (repealed)	2 & 3 Vict. c. lxv	1 July 1839
An Act for farther improving and maintaining the Harbour of the Burgh of Regality of Fraserburgh in the County of Aberdeen. (Repealed by Fraserburgh Harbour Act 1878 (41 & 42 Vict. c. cii))
West Croft Canal Act 1839	2 & 3 Vict. c. lxvi	4 July 1839
An Act for forming a Canal and other Works within and near certain Lands called the West Croft, in the Parish of Saint Mary in the Town and County of the Town of Nottingham.
Peterborough and Nassaburgh Gaol Act 1839 (repealed)	2 & 3 Vict. c. lxvii	4 July 1839
An Act for building a new Gaol for the Liberty or Soke of Peterborough and Hundred of Nassaburgh in the County of Northampton, and for other Purposes connected therewith. (Repealed by Statute Law (Repeals) Act 2008 (c. 12))
Itchen Bridge and Roads Acts Amendment Act 1839 (repealed)	2 & 3 Vict. c. lxviii	4 July 1839
An Act for amending and enlarging the Powers of Acts for establishing a floating Bridge over the River Itchen near the Town of Southampton. (Repealed by Southampton Corporation Act 1973 (c. xix))
Manchester and Birmingham Railway Act 1839 (repealed)	2 & 3 Vict. c. lxix	4 July 1839
An Act to enable the Manchester and Birmingham Railway Company to vary and extend the Line of their Railway; and to amend the Act (Note: Manchester and Birmingham Railway Act 1837 (7 Will. 4 & 1 Vict. c. lxix)) relating thereto. (Repealed by London and North Western Railway Act 1846 (9 & 10 Vict. c. cciv))
Monkland and Kirkintilloch Railway Act 1839	2 & 3 Vict. c. lxx	4 July 1839
An Act to enable the Monkland and Kirkintilloch Railway Company to raise a further Sum of Money; and to amend the Acts relating to the said Undertaking.
West Durham Railway Act 1839	2 & 3 Vict. c. lxxi	4 July 1839
An Act for incorporating certain Persons for the making and maintaining a Railway from the Township of Crook and Billy Row to the Byers Green Branch of the Clarence Railway in the Parish of Saint Andrew Auckland, all in the County of Durham, to be called "The West Durham Railway."
Portsmouth Quay and Harbour Act 1839	2 & 3 Vict. c. lxxii	4 July 1839
An Act for enlarging the Town Quay of the Borough of Portsmouth, and for improving that Portion of the Harbour of Portsmouth called The Camber.
River Moy Navigation Act 1839 (repealed)	2 & 3 Vict. c. lxxiii	4 July 1839
An Act for the Improvement of the Navigation of the River Moy in the Counties of Mayo and Sligo in Ireland. (Repealed by Moy Navigation Amendment Act 1860 (23 & 24 Vict. c. clxv))
Newport Dock Company Act 1839	2 & 3 Vict. c. lxxiv	19 July 1839
An Act to enable the Newport Dock Company to raise a further Sum of Money.
Deptford Pier Act 1839	2 & 3 Vict. c. lxxv	19 July 1839
An Act to alter and amend the Powers and Provisions of an Act of the Fifth Year of the Reign of His Majesty King William the Fourth, (Note: Deptford Pier Act 1835 (5 & 6 Will. 4. c. xiii)) for making and maintaining a Pier and other Works at Deptford in the County of Kent.
Deptford Pier Junction Railway Act 1839	2 & 3 Vict. c. lxxvi	19 July 1839
An Act to alter and amend the Powers and Provisions of an Act (Note: Deptford Pier Junction Railway Act 1836 (6 & 7 Will. 4. c. lxiii)) for making a Railway from the London and Greenwich Railway to the Deptford Pier, to be called "The Deptford Pier Junction Railway."
Northern and Eastern Railway Act 1839	2 & 3 Vict. c. lxxvii	19 July 1839
An Act to amend and extend the Powers of the Northern and Eastern Railway Act. (Note: Northern and Eastern Railway Act 1836 (6 & 7 Will. 4. c. ciii))
Northern and Eastern Railway and Eastern Counties Railway Junction Act 1839	2 & 3 Vict. c. lxxviii	19 July 1839
An Act to enable the Northern and Eastern Railway Company to alter the Line of their Railway by forming a Junction with the Eastern Counties Railway; and to provide a Station and other Works at Shoreditch; and to amend the Act (Note: Northern and Eastern Railway Act 1836 (6 & 7 Will. 4. c. ciii)) relating to the Northern and Eastern Railway.
South Eastern Railway and London and Brighton Railway Junction Act 1839	2 & 3 Vict. c. lxxix	19 July 1839
An Act to alter and divert the Line of the South-eastern Railway from a Point thereon in the Parish of Chiddingstone in the County of Kent so as to join the London and Brighton Railway at or near Redstone Hill in the Parish of Reigate in the County of Surrey.
Over Darwen Gas Act 1839 (repealed)	2 & 3 Vict. c. lxxx	19 July 1839
An Act for better lighting with Gas the Village of Over Darwen in the County Palatine of Lancaster. (Repealed by Over Darwen Gas Act 1855 (18 & 19 Vict. c. xliii))
Sidmouth Market Act 1839	2 & 3 Vict. c. lxxxi	19 July 1839
An Act for maintaining and regulating the Market in the Parish of Sidmouth in the County of Devon.
Anniesland Turnpike and St. George's Road Act 1839 or the Anniesland and St. George's Turnpike Road Extension Act 1839	2 & 3 Vict. c. lxxxii	19 July 1839
An Act for extending and enlarging an Act passed in the Seventh Year of the Reign of His late Majesty King William the Fourth, (Note: Anniesland and St. George's Turnpike Road Act 1836 (6 & 7 Will. 4. c. cxxxviii)) for making and maintaining a Turnpike Road from Anniesland Toll Bar in the County of Lanark; and for making and maintaining another Branch Road, to be called Saint George's Road, in connexion with the said Road.
London Patent White Lead Company Act 1839	2 & 3 Vict. c. lxxxiii	19 July 1839
An Act for forming and establishing "The London Patent White Lead Company;" and to enable the said Company to purchase certain Letters Patent.
General Filtration and Dye Extract Company Act 1839	2 & 3 Vict. c. lxxxiv	19 July 1839
An Act for forming and regulating a Company to be called "The General Filtration and Dye Extract Company;" and to enable the said Company to purchase certain Letters Patent.
Pontefract Small Debts Recovery Act 1839 (repealed)	2 & 3 Vict. c. lxxxv	29 July 1839
An Act for the more easy and speedy Recovery of Small Debts and Damages within the Honour of Pontefract, Parcel of Her Majesty's Duchy of Lancaster, in the West Riding of the County of York; and for altering the Practice and extending the Jurisdiction of the Court Baron of the said Honour. (Repealed by County Courts Act 1846 (9 & 10 Vict. c. 95))
Aberford Small Debts Recovery Act 1839 (repealed)	2 & 3 Vict. c. lxxxvi	29 July 1839
An Act for the more easy and speedy Recovery of Small Debts within the Town of Aberford and other Places in the West Riding of the County of York. (Repealed by County Courts Act 1846 (9 & 10 Vict. c. 95))
Rotherham Small Debts Recovery Act 1839 (repealed)	2 & 3 Vict. c. lxxxvii	29 July 1839
An Act for the more easy and speedy Recovery of Small Debts within the Town of Rotherham and other Places in the West Riding of the County of York. (Repealed by County Courts Act 1846 (9 & 10 Vict. c. 95))
Glossop Small Debts Recovery Act 1839 (repealed)	2 & 3 Vict. c. lxxxviii	29 July 1839
An Act for the more easy and speedy Recovery of Small Debts within the Town and Manor of Glossop and other Places in the Parish of Glossop in the County of Derby. (Repealed by County Courts Act 1846 (9 & 10 Vict. c. 95))
Grantham Small Debts Recovery Act 1839 (repealed)	2 & 3 Vict. c. lxxxix	29 July 1839
An Act for the more easy and speedy Recovery of Small Debts within the Town or Borough of Grantham in the County of Lincoln, and other Places in the Counties of Lincoln, and Leicester. (Repealed by County Courts Act 1846 (9 & 10 Vict. c. 95))
Rochdale Small Debts Recovery Act 1839 (repealed)	2 & 3 Vict. c. xc	29 July 1839
An Act for the more easy and speedy Recovery of Small Debts within the Town of Rochdale and other Places in the County Palatine of Lancaster. (Repealed by County Courts Act 1846 (9 & 10 Vict. c. 95))
Warrington Small Debts Recovery Act 1839 (repealed)	2 & 3 Vict. c. xci	29 July 1839
An Act for the more easy and speedy Recovery of Small Debts within the Town of Warrington, and several other Places adjacent thereto, in the Counties of Lancaster and Chester. (Repealed by County Courts Act 1846 (9 & 10 Vict. c. 95))
Liverpool Building Regulation Act 1839 (repealed)	2 & 3 Vict. c. xcii	29 July 1839
An Act for altering, amending, consolidating, and enlarging the Provisions of certain Acts resulting to the Regulation of Buildings in the Borough of Liverpool. (Repealed by Liverpool Public Health and Buildings Act 1842 (5 & 6 Vict. c. xliv))
Ship Propeller Company Act 1839	2 & 3 Vict. c. xciii	29 July 1839
An Act for forming and regulating a Company to be called "The Ship Propeller Company;" and to enable the said Company to purchase certain Letters Patent.
City of London Police Act 1839	2 & 3 Vict. c. xciv	17 August 1839
An Act for regulating the Police in the City of London.
Commercial Railway Act 1839	2 & 3 Vict. c. xcv	17 August 1839
An Act for extending the Line of the Railway between London and Blackwall called "The Commercial Railway;" and for amending the Acts relating thereto.
Brighton Cemetery Act 1839	2 & 3 Vict. c. xcvi	17 August 1839
An Act for establishing a General Cemetery for the Interment of the Dead in the Parish of Brighton in the County of Sussex.
Hatfield (Yorkshire) Small Debts Recovery Act 1839 (repealed)	2 & 3 Vict. c. xcvii	17 August 1839
An Act for the more speedy Recovery of Small Debts within the Manor of Hatfield and other Places in the West Riding of the County of York. (Repealed by Statute Law (Repeals) Act 2013 (c. 2))
Belper Small Debts Recovery Act 1839 (repealed)	2 & 3 Vict. c. xcviii	17 August 1839
An Act for the more easy and speedy Recovery of Small Debts within the Town of Belper and several other Places in the County of Derby. (Repealed by County Courts Act 1846 (9 & 10 Vict. c. 95))
Newark Small Debts Recovery Act 1839 (repealed)	2 & 3 Vict. c. xcix	17 August 1839
An Act for the more easy and speedy Recovery of Small Debts within the Borough of Newark and other Places in the Counties of Nottingham and Lincoln. (Repealed by Statute Law (Repeals) Act 2013 (c. 2))
Prestwich-cum-Oldham and Middleton Small Debts Recovery Act 1839 (repealed)	2 & 3 Vict. c. c	17 August 1839
An Act for the more easy Recovery of Small Debts within the Parishes of Prestwich-cum-Oldham and Middleton in the County of Lancaster. (Repealed by County Courts Act 1846 (9 & 10 Vict. c. 95))
Bury (Lancashire) Small Debts Recovery Act 1839 (repealed)	2 & 3 Vict. c. ci	17 August 1839
An Act for the more easy and speedy Recovery of Small Debts within the Town of Bury and other Places therein mentioned in the County of Lancaster. (Repealed by County Courts Act 1846 (9 & 10 Vict. c. 95))
Wirksworth Small Debts Recovery Act 1839 (repealed)	2 & 3 Vict. c. cii	17 August 1839
An Act for the more easy and speedy Recovery of Small Debts within the Parish of Wirksworth, and other Parishes and Places adjacent or near thereto, in the several Counties of Derby and Stafford. (Repealed by County Courts Act 1846 (9 & 10 Vict. c. 95))
Eckington Small Debts Recovery Act 1839 (repealed)	2 & 3 Vict. c. ciii	17 August 1839
An Act for the more easy and speedy Recovery of Small Debts within the Parish of Eckington and other Places in the County of Derby. (Repealed by County Courts Act 1846 (9 & 10 Vict. c. 95))
Chesterfield Small Debts Recovery Act 1839 (repealed)	2 & 3 Vict. c. civ	17 August 1839
An Act for the more easy and speedy Recovery of Small Debts within the Borough and Parish of Chesterfield, and other Parishes and Places adjacent or near thereto, in the County of Derby. (Repealed by County Courts Act 1846 (9 & 10 Vict. c. 95))
Nottingham Small Debts Recovery Act 1839 (repealed)	2 & 3 Vict. c. cv	17 August 1839
An Act for the more easy and speedy Recovery of Small Debts within the Town and County of the Town of Nottingham, and other Places therein mentioned, in the Counties of Nottingham and Derby. (Repealed by County Courts Act 1846 (9 & 10 Vict. c. 95))
Yorkshire Small Debts Recovery Act 1839 (repealed)	2 & 3 Vict. c. cvi	24 August 1839
An Act for the more easy and speedy Recovery of Small Debts within the Parishes of Halifax, Bradford, Keighley, Bingley, Guiseley, Colverley, Batley, Birstal, Mirfield, Hartishead-cum-Clifton, Almondbury, Kirkheaton, Kirkburton, and Huddersfield, and the Lordship or Liberty of Tong, in the County of York. (Repealed by County Courts Act 1846 (9 & 10 Vict. c. 95))
London Bridge Approaches Act 1839	2 & 3 Vict. c. cvii	26 August 1839
An Act for further extending the Approaches to London Bridge, and amending the Acts relating thereto.

=== Private acts ===
Short title	Citation	Royal assent
Long title
Oxenbourne and Ramsdean Inclosure Act 1839	2 & 3 Vict. c. 1 Pr.	14 May 1839
An Act for inclosing certain Open and Common Downs or Sheepwalks within the several Tithings of Oxenbourn and Ramsdean in the Parish and Manor of Eastmeon in the County of Southampton.
Chirk Inclosure Act 1839	2 & 3 Vict. c. 2 Pr.	14 May 1839
An Act for inclosing Lands in the Honour or Lordship of Chirk and Chirk Land in the several Parishes of Llangollen and Llainsaintfraid Glyn Ceiriog in the County of Denbigh.
Stow-cum-Quy Inclosure Act 1839	2 & 3 Vict. c. 3 Pr.	14 May 1839
An Act for inclosing Lands in the Parish of Stow cum Quy in the County of Cambridge.
Moulton Inclosure Act 1839	2 & 3 Vict. c. 4 Pr.	14 May 1839
An Act for inclosing Lands in the Parish of Moulton in the County of Suffolk.
Fretherne and Saul Inclosure Act 1839	2 & 3 Vict. c. 5 Pr.	14 May 1839
An Act for inclosing Lands in the Parishes of Fretherne and Saul in the County of Gloucester.
Melbourn Inclosure Act 1839	2 & 3 Vict. c. 6 Pr.	14 May 1839
An Act for inclosing Lands in the Parish of Melbourn in the County of Cambridge.
Tetbury Vicarage Act 1839	2 & 3 Vict. c. 7 Pr.	14 May 1839
An Act for the Sale of the Advowson of the Vicarage of Tetbury in the County of Gloucester.
Berkeley Inclosure Act 1839	2 & 3 Vict. c. 8 Pr.	4 June 1839
An Act for inclosing Lands in the Parish of Berkeley in the County of Gloucester.
Totley or Dronfield Inclosure Act 1839	2 & 3 Vict. c. 9 Pr.	4 June 1839
An Act for inclosing Lands in the Manor and Township of Totley in the Parish of Dronfield in the County of Derby.
Unstone Inclosure Act 1839	2 & 3 Vict. c. 10 Pr.	4 June 1839
An Act for inclosing Lands in the Manor of Unstone in the Parish of Dronfield in the County of Derby.
Ringstead Inclosure Act 1839	2 & 3 Vict. c. 11 Pr.	4 June 1839
An Act for inclosing Lands in the Parish of Ringstead in the County of Northampton.
Barton Inclosure Act 1839	2 & 3 Vict. c. 12 Pr.	14 June 1839
An Act for inclosing Lands in the Parish of Barton in the County of Cambridge.
Clun Inclosure Act 1839	2 & 3 Vict. c. 13 Pr.	14 June 1839
An Act for inclosing Lands in the Borough or Township of Clun in the Parish of Clun in the County of Salop.
Comberton Inclosure Act 1839	2 & 3 Vict. c. 14 Pr.	14 June 1839
An Act for inclosing Lands in the Parish of Comberton in the County of Cambridge.
Rampton Inclosure Act 1839	2 & 3 Vict. c. 15 Pr.	14 June 1839
An Act for inclosing Lands in the Parish of Rampton in the County of Cambridge.
Mills's Estate Act 1839	2 & 3 Vict. c. 16 Pr.	14 June 1839
An Act to enable Jane Mills to grant Building and Repairing Leases of Estates in the Parish of Aston-juxta-Birmingham in the County of Warwick devised by the Will of the late Wriothesley Digby Esquire; and also to alter and amend the Power of leasing contained in the Marriage Settlement of Charles Wriothesley Digby Esquire.
William Hulme's Settlement Act 1839	2 & 3 Vict. c. 17 Pr.	14 June 1839
An Act to enable the Trustees of the Estates devised by William Hulme Esquire to appropriate certain Parts of the accumulated Fund arising from the said Estates towards the Endowment of Benefices, the building of Churches, and for other Purposes.
Robert Raikes's Estate Act 1839	2 & 3 Vict. c. 18 Pr.	14 June 1839
An Act for vesting certain Hereditaments situate in the Parish of Drypool within the Borough of Kingston-upon-Hull and in the Parish of Sutton in the East Riding of the County of York respectively, late the Property of Robert Raikes Esquire, deceased, in Trustees, upon Trust to be sold, and for laying out the Money arising therefrom in the Purchase of other Estates to be settled to the same Uses.
Duke of Buckingham's Estate Act 1839	2 & 3 Vict. c. 19 Pr.	1 July 1839
An Act for giving Effect to certain Powers as to Parts of the Settled Estates of the Most Noble Richard Plantagenet Duke of Buckingham and Chandos.
Bethlem Hospital Act 1839 (repealed)	2 & 3 Vict. c. 20 Pr.	1 July 1839
An Act to enable the Mayor and Commonalty and Citizens of the City of London to let and sell Parcels of Ground in Saint George's Fields near Bethlem Hospital to the Governors of the said Hospital. (Repealed by Statute Law (Repeals) Act 2013 (c. 2))
Harrow School's Estate Act 1839	2 & 3 Vict. c. 21 Pr.	1 July 1839
An Act for enabling the Keepers and Governors of the Possessions, Revenues, and Goods of the Free Grammar School of John Lyon within the Town of Harrow on the Hill in the County of Middlesex to grant improving Leases of their Estates at Harrow and Barnet, and for other Purposes therein mentioned.
Blunt's Estate Act 1839	2 & 3 Vict. c. 22 Pr.	1 July 1839
An Act for explaining and amending an Act made and passed in the Fifty-ninth Year of His Majesty King George the Third, intituled "An Act for vesting the Manor of Oram, and certain Messuages, Lands, Tenements, and Hereditaments in the County of Sussex, Part of the Settled Estates by the Will of Samuel Blunt Esquire, deceased, in Trustees, to be sold; and for vesting the Money arising from such Sale in the Purchase of other Estates, to be settled to the same Uses." (Note: Samuel Blunt's Estate Act 1819 (59 Geo. 3. c. 44 Pr.))
Sharp's Estate Act 1839	2 & 3 Vict. c. 23 Pr.	1 July 1839
An Act for vesting certain Parts of the devised Estates of Hannah Gilpin Sharp Widow, deceased, in Trustees, in Trust to be sold or demised, for the Purposes therein mentioned.
Ladykirk (Robertson's) Estate Act 1839	2 & 3 Vict. c. 24 Pr.	1 July 1839
An Act for vesting certain Parts of the Entailed Estate of Ladykirk in Trustees to be sold, for Payment of the Debts affecting the same, and for other Purposes therewith connected.
Earl of Darnley's Estate Act 1839	2 & 3 Vict. c. 25 Pr.	1 July 1839
An Act for authorizing the granting of Leases of Part of the Estates in the County of Kent devised by the Will of the Right Honourable Edward Earl of Darnley deceased.
Hodson's Estate Act 1839	2 & 3 Vict. c. 26 Pr.	1 July 1839
An Act to authorize the granting of Mining and Building Leases and Conveyances of Parts of Use Estates devised by the Will of James Alexander Hodson Esquire, deceased, subject to the Trusts of such Will.
London Corporation Estate Act 1839	2 & 3 Vict. c. 27 Pr.	1 July 1839
An Act to enable the Mayor and Commonalty and Citizens of the City of London to sell Building Ground in Saint Georges Fields.
Westcroft Inclosure Act 1839 (repealed)	2 & 3 Vict. c. 28 Pr.	1 July 1839
An Act for inclosing certain Lands called the West Croft and Burton Leys, in the Parish of Saint Mary in the Town and County of the Town of Nottingham. (Repealed by Statute Law (Repeals) Act 1995 (c. 44))
West Beckham and Alby Inclosure Act 1839	2 & 3 Vict. c. 29 Pr.	1 July 1839
An Act for inclosing Lands in the Parishes of West Beckham and Alby in the County of Norfolk.
Almsworthy Inclosure Act 1839	2 & 3 Vict. c. 30 Pr.	1 July 1839
An Act for inclosing Lands in the Manor of Almsworthy in the Parish of Exford in the County of Somerset.
Hartishead or Dewsbury Inclosure Act 1839	2 & 3 Vict. c. 31 Pr.	1 July 1839
An Act for inclosing Lands in the Township of Hartishead otherwise Hartshead in the Parish of Dewsbury in the West Riding of the County of York.
Nottingham Common Fields Inclosure Act 1839 (repealed)	2 & 3 Vict. c. 32 Pr.	1 July 1839
An Act for inclosing, allotting, and improving certain Open Fields in the Parish of Saint Mary in the Town and County of the Town of Nottingham. (Repealed by Statute Law (Repeals) Act 1995 (c. 44))
Liverpool Churches Act 1839 (repealed)	2 & 3 Vict. c. 33 Pr.	4 July 1839
An Act for altering and amending certain Acts relating to the Churches of Saint Mark, Saint Luke, and Saint Michael in the Borough of Liverpool. (Repealed by Liverpool and Wigan Churches Act 1904 (4 Edw. 7. c. c))
Lord Templemore's Estate Act 1839	2 & 3 Vict. c. 34 Pr.	4 July 1839
An Act for vesting the Estate called the Combe Bank Estate, late belonging to the Right Honourable Arthur Lord Templemore, deceased, in Trustees to sell the same, and to invest the Produce of such Sale for the Benefit of his infant Sons.
Marshall's Estate Act 1839	2 & 3 Vict. c. 35 Pr.	19 July 1839
An Act to authorize the Sale of certain Lands, Tenements, and Hereditaments in the Counties of Kent and Northampton, formerly belonging to William Marshall of Cliffords Inn in the City of London, Gentleman, deceased; and for other Purposes incidental thereto.
Earl of Galloway's Estate Act 1839	2 & 3 Vict. c. 36 Pr.	19 July 1839
An Act to enable Randolph Earl of Galloway, or the Heir in Possession of the Entailed Estates of Garlies, Baldoon, Newton Stewart, and others, in the County of Wigton and Stewartrv of Kirkcudbright, to reclaim certain sleechy Ground on the Shores of the said Estates, and to drain and improve the Moss of Cree, Part thereof; and to burden the said Estates partially, and the reclaimed and improved Land, with the Expence; and also to burden the said Estates with certain Expences incurred by the said Earl in improving the same.
Davie's Estate Act 1839	2 & 3 Vict. c. 37 Pr.	19 July 1839
An Act for vesting Parts of the Estates of Sir John Davie Baronet, deceased, in Trustees, upon Trust to be sold; and for laying out the Purchase Money, under the Direction of the Court of Chancery, in the Purchase of other Estates, to be settled to the same Uses.
Hall's Estate Act 1839	2 & 3 Vict. c. 38 Pr.	19 July 1839
An Act for effecting an Exchange of Mines and Lands between Sir Benjamin Hall Baronet and others, and Capel Hanbury Leigh Esquire and others.
Earl of Stamford's Estate Act 1839	2 & 3 Vict. c. 39 Pr.	19 July 1839
An Act to authorize Conveyances in Fee Farm, or Demises for long Terms of Years under reserved Rents, of certain Parts of the Settled Estates of the Right Honourable George Harry Earl of Stamford and Warrington.
Reading Corporation Estate Act 1839 (repealed)	2 & 3 Vict. c. 40 Pr.	19 July 1839
An Act to enable the Mayor, Aldermen, and Burgesses of the Borough of Reading in the County of Berks to sell certain Real Estate discharged from certain Liabilities, and to invest the Purchase Monies arising from such Sales in the Purchase of other Real Estate, to be charged with such Liabilities. (Repealed by Berkshire Act 1986 (c. ii))
Marquis of Cholmondeley's Estate Act 1839	2 & 3 Vict. c. 41 Pr.	29 July 1839
An Act for exchanging Freehold and Copyhold Estates belonging to John Motteux Esquire, in West Rudham and East Rudham in the County of Norfolk, for Freehold, Copyhold, and Leasehold Estates in Darsingham in the same County, settled under the Will of Horatio Earl of Orford deceased.
Boulton's Estate Act 1839	2 & 3 Vict. c. 42 Pr.	29 July 1839
An Act for authorizing the Sale of the Real Estate devised by the Will of Henry Boulton Esquire, deceased, and for the Application of the Monies to arise thereby.
Bligh's Estate Act 1839	2 & 3 Vict. c. 43 Pr.	29 July 1839
An Act for vesting the undivided Sixth Share of Ann Campbell Bligh Spinster, a Lunatic, as One of the Six Daughters and Co-heiresses of William Bligh Esquire, deceased, in certain Lands and Hereditaments in New South Wales of which the said William Bligh died seised, in Trustees, in whom the other Five undivided Sixth Shares are now vested, upon Trust for Sale.
Templar's Estate Act 1839	2 & 3 Vict. c. 44 Pr.	29 July 1839
An Act for enabling the Trustees of the Will of the Reverend John Templer Clerk, deceased, to exchange certain of the Real Estates thereby devised, situate in the County of Devon, for certain other Estates situate in the same County.
Russell's Estate Act 1839	2 & 3 Vict. c. 45 Pr.	17 August 1839
An Act to enable William Russell Esquire to grant Leases of Coal Mines under the Lands within the Manor or Lordship of Brancepeth and other Lands In the County of Durham, devised by or subject to the Uses and Trusts of the Will and Codicil of William Russell Esquire, deceased, and the Will and Codicil of Matthew Russell Esquire, deceased.
Rathkeale and Croagh Inclosure Act 1839 or the Rathkeale and Croagh (Limerick) Inclosure Act 1839	2 & 3 Vict. c. 46 Pr.	17 August 1839
An Act for inclosing Lands within the Parishes of Rathkeale and Croagh in the County of Limerick.
Kayser's Naturalization Act 1839 (Note: This act was not printed by the Queen's Printer.)	2 & 3 Vict. c. 47 Pr.	27 March 1839
An Act for naturalizing John Christoph Kayser.
Beckett's Name Act 1839	2 & 3 Vict. c. 48 Pr.	19 April 1839
An Act to enable William Beckett Esquire and his Issue Male to take the Name and bear the Arms of Turner, pursuant to the Will of Martha Turner Widow, deceased.
Reuss's Naturalization Act 1839	2 & 3 Vict. c. 49 Pr.	14 May 1839
An Act for naturalizing Ernest Reuss.
Antũnano's Naturalization Act 1839	2 & 3 Vict. c. 50 Pr.	14 May 1839
An Act for naturalizing Don Manuel de la Torre y Antũnano.
Biber's Naturalization Act 1839	2 & 3 Vict. c. 51 Pr.	14 May 1839
An Act for naturalizing George Edward Biber.
Napier's Divorce Act 1839	2 & 3 Vict. c. 52 Pr.	4 June 1839
An Act to dissolve the Marriage of Johnstone Napier Esquire, a Lieutenant Colonel in the Military Service of the East India Company on their Madras Establishment, with Isabella his now Wife, and to enable him to marry again; and for other Purposes therein mentioned.
Lardner's Divorce Act 1839	2 & 3 Vict. c. 53 Pr.	14 June 1839
An Act to dissolve the Marriage of Dionysius Lardner Clerk, Doctor of Civil Law, with Cecilia Lardner his now Wife, and to enable him to marry again; and for other Purposes therein mentioned.
Coode's Divorce Act 1839	2 & 3 Vict. c. 54 Pr.	1 July 1839
An Act to dissolve the Marriage of Henry Coode (otherwise Cood) Esquire with Jane his now Wife, and to enable him to many again; and for other Purposes.
Carleton's Divorce Act 1839	2 & 3 Vict. c. 55 Pr.	1 July 1839
An Act to dissolve the Marriage of William Carleton Esquire with Rosamond Carleton his now Wife, and to enable him to marry again; and for other Purposes therein mentioned.
Ivanoff's Naturalization Act 1839	2 & 3 Vict. c. 56 Pr.	1 July 1839
An Act for naturalizing Nicola Ivanoff.
Allison's Divorce Act 1839	2 & 3 Vict. c. 57 Pr.	4 July 1839
An Act to dissolve the Marriage of Robert Allison with Mary Ann his now Wife, and to enable him to marry again; and for other Purposes therein mentioned.
Pemberton's Divorce Act 1839	2 & 3 Vict. c. 58 Pr.	19 July 1839
An Act to dissolve the Marriage of Edward Leigh Pemberton with Charlotte his now Wife, and to enable him to marry again; and for other Purposes therein mentioned.
Mellin's Divorce Act 1839	2 & 3 Vict. c. 59 Pr.	19 July 1839
An Act to dissolve the Marriage of Richard John Sutcliffe Mellin Esquire with Jane Mellin his now Wife, and to enable him to marry again; and for other Purposes therein mentioned.
Weguelin's Divorce Act 1839	2 & 3 Vict. c. 60 Pr.	19 July 1839
An Act to dissolve the Marriage of the Reverend William Andrew Weguelin Clerk with Emma his now Wife, and to enable him to marry again; and for other Purposes therein mentioned.
Count de Saint George's Naturalization Act 1839	2 & 3 Vict. c. 61 Pr.	19 July 1839
An Act for naturalizing Alexander Henry Augustus John Count de Saint George.
Goddard's Naturalization Act 1839	2 & 3 Vict. c. 62 Pr.	24 August 1839
An Act for naturalizing Samuel Aspinwall Goddard.

=== Sources ===
- The Statutes of the United Kingdom of Great Britain and Ireland, 2 & 3 Victoria. 1839. 1839 – via Internet Archive.
- The Statutes of the United Kingdom of Great Britain and Ireland, 2 & 3 Victoria. 1839. 1839 – via Google Books.
- Journal of the House of Commons (PDF). Vol. 94. London: His Majesty's Stationery Office. pp. 3–585 – via parliament.uk.
- Chronological Table of and Index to the Statutes. Vol. 1: To the End of the Session 59 Vict. Sess. 2 (1895) (13th ed.). London: Her Majesty's Stationery Office. 1896. pp. 295–299 – via Google Books.

== See also ==
- List of acts of the Parliament of the United Kingdom
