= Coinage Act 1708 =

Act of the Parliament of Great Britain

- Act of Parliament
- Parliament of Great Britain
- Long title: An Act for continuing the former Acts for the Encouragement of the Coinage; and to encourage the bringing Foreign Coins, and British or Foreign Plate, to be coined; and for making Provision for the Mints in Scotland; and for the prosecuting Offences concerning the Coin in England.
- Citation: 7 Ann. c. 24
- Territorial extent: Great Britain

Dates
- Royal assent: 21 April 1709
- Commencement: 16 November 1708 (Note: Start of session.)
- Repealed: 15 July 1867
Other legislation
Amends	Coin Act 1666; Coinage Act 1672; The Mint Act 1705
Repealed by	Statute Law Revision Act 1867
Relates to	Coinage Act 1685; Taxation Act 1700; Estreats (Personal Representatives) Act 1692

Status: Repealed

Text of statute as originally enacted

The Coinage Act 1708 (7 Ann. c. 24) was an act of the Parliament of Great Britain.

== Provisions ==
Section 1 of the act continued the Coin Act 1666 (18 & 19 Cha. 2. c. 5), as continued by the Coinage Act 1672 (25 Cha. 2. c. 8), revived and continued by the Coinage Act 1685 (1 Ja. 2. c. 7), continued by the Estreats (Personal Representatives) Act 1692 (4 Will. & Mar. c. 24) and continued by the Taxation Act 1700 (12 & 13 Will. 3. c. 11), and the Mint Act 1705 (4 & 5 Ann. c. 9) until the end of the first session of the next parliament 7 years after 1 March 1708. Section 1 of the act also extended the acts "to all Wines and such other Liquors as aforesaid which shall be imported or brought into Great Britain for and during all such Term and Time as are before mentioned".

== Subsequent developments ==
The whole act was repealed by section 1 of, and the schedule to, the Statute Law Revision Act 1867 (30 & 31 Vict. c. 59), which came into force on 15 July 1867.
