= Taxation Act 1700 =

Act of the Parliament of England

- Act of Parliament
- Parliament of England
- Long title: An Act for granting to his Majesty several duties upon low wines or spirits of the first extraction, and continuing several additional duties upon coffee, tea, chocolate, spices and pictures, and certain impositions upon hawkers, pedlars, and petty chapmen, and the duty of fifteen per centum upon muslins, and for improving the duties upon japanned and lacquered goods, and for continuing the coinage duty, and the several terms and purposes therein mentioned.
- Citation: 12 & 13 Will. 3. c. 11
- Territorial extent: England and Wales

Dates
- Royal assent: 24 June 1701
- Commencement: 6 February 1701 (Note: Section 1.)
- Repealed: 15 July 1867
Other legislation
Amends	Coin Act 1666; Coinage Act 1672
Repealed by	Statute Law Revision Act 1867
Relates to	Estreats (Personal Representatives) Act 1692; Coinage Act 1685; Coinage Act 1708

Status: Repealed

Text of statute as originally enacted

The Taxation Act 1700 (12 & 13 Will. 3. c. 11) was an act of the Parliament of England.

== Provisions ==
Section 12 of the act revived and continued the Coin Act 1666 (18 & 19 Cha. 2. c. 5), as continued by the Coinage Act 1672 (25 Cha. 2. c. 8), revived and continued by the Coinage Act 1685 (1 Ja. 2. c. 7) and continued by the Estreats (Personal Representatives) Act 1692 (4 Will. & Mar. c. 24), until the end of the first session of the next parliament 7 years after 1 June 1701.

== Subsequent developments ==
Section 1 of the Coinage Act 1708 (7 Ann. c. 24) continued the Coin Act 1666 (18 Cha. 2. c. 5), as continued by the Coinage Act 1672 (25 Cha. 2. c. 8) and revived and continued by the Estreats (Personal Representatives) Act 1692 (4 Will. & Mar. c. 24), continued by the Estreats (Personal Representatives) Act 1692 (4 Will. & Mar. c. 24) and continued by the act, until the end of the next session of parliament after 7 years from 1 March 1708.

The whole act was repealed by section 1 of, and the schedule to, the Statute Law Revision Act 1867 (30 & 31 Vict. c. 59), which came into force on 15 July 1867.
