= List of acts of the Parliament of England from 1690 =

This is a list of acts of the Parliament of England for the year 1690.

For acts passed during the period 1707–1800, see the list of acts of the Parliament of Great Britain. See also the list of acts of the Parliament of Scotland, and the list of acts of the Parliament of Ireland.

For acts passed from 1801 onwards, see the list of acts of the Parliament of the United Kingdom. For acts of the devolved parliaments and assemblies in the United Kingdom, see the list of acts of the Scottish Parliament, the list of acts of the Northern Ireland Assembly, and the list of acts and measures of Senedd Cymru; see also the list of acts of the Parliament of Northern Ireland.

For medieval statutes, etc. that are not considered to be acts of Parliament, see the list of English statutes.

See also the List of ordinances and acts of the Parliament of England, 1642–1660 for ordinances and acts passed by the Long Parliament and other bodies without royal assent, and which were not considered to be valid legislation following the Restoration in 1660.

The number shown after each act's title is its chapter number. Acts are cited using this number, preceded by the years of the reign during which the relevant parliamentary session was held; thus the Union with Ireland Act 1800 is cited as "39 & 40 Geo. 3. c. 67", meaning the 67th act passed during the session that started in the 39th year of the reign of George III and which finished in the 40th year of that reign. The modern convention is to use Arabic numerals in citations (thus "41 Geo. 3" rather than "41 Geo. III"). Acts of the last session of the Parliament of Great Britain and the first session of the Parliament of the United Kingdom are both cited as "41 Geo. 3".

Acts passed by the Parliament of England did not have a short title; however, some of these acts have subsequently been given a short title by acts of the Parliament of the United Kingdom, such as the Short Titles Act 1896 (59 & 60 Vict. c. 14).

Acts passed by the Parliament of England were deemed to have come into effect on the first day of the session in which they were passed. Because of this, the years given in the list below may in fact be the year before a particular act was passed.

== 2 Will. & Mar. Sess. 2 ==
The second session of the 2nd Parliament of William and Mary, which met from 2 October 1690 until 26 May 1691.

This session was also traditionally cited as 2 Will. & Mar. Stat. 2, 2 Will. & Mar. stat. 2, 2 Will. & Mar. St. 2, 2 Will. & Mar. st. 2, 2 Will. & Mary, Sess. 2, 2 Will. & Mary, Stat. 2, 2 Will. & Mary, stat. 2, 2 Will. & Mary, St. 2, 2 Will. & Mary, st. 2, 2 Gul. & Mar. Sess. 2, 2 Gul. & Mar. Stat. 2, 2 Gul. & Mar. stat. 2, 2 Gul. & Mar. St. 2, 2 Gul. & Mar. st. 2, 2 W. & M. Sess. 2, 2 W. & M. Stat. 2, 2 W. & M. stat. 2, 2 W. & M. St. 2 or 2 W. & M. st. 2

=== Public acts ===
Short title	Citation	Royal assent
Long title
Taxation Act 1690 (repealed)	2 Will. & Mar. Sess. 2. c. 1	10 November 1690
An Act for Granting an Ayd to Their Majestyes of the Summe of Sixteene hundred fifty one thousand seaven hundred and two pounds eighteene shillings. (Repealed by Statute Law Revision Act 1867 (30 & 31 Vict. c. 59))
Admiralty Act 1690 (repealed)	2 Will. & Mar. Sess. 2. c. 2	18 November 1690
An Act concerning the Commissioners of the Admiralty. (Repealed by Defence (Transfer of Functions) (No. 1) Order 1964 (SI 1964/488))
Taxation (Beer) Act 1690 (repealed)	2 Will. & Mar. Sess. 2. c. 3	25 November 1690
An Act for doubling the Duty of Excise upon Beere Ale and other Liquors dureing the space of one yeare. (Repealed by Statute Law Revision Act 1867 (30 & 31 Vict. c. 59))
Taxation (No. 3) Act 1690 (repealed)	2 Will. & Mar. Sess. 2. c. 4	20 December 1690
An Act, for granting to their Majesties certaine Impositions upon all East India Goods and Manufactures and upon all wrought Silks and severall other Goods and Merchandize to be imported after the five and twentyeth day of December one thousand six hundred and ninety. (Repealed by Statute Law Revision Act 1867 (30 & 31 Vict. c. 59))
Taxation (No. 4) Act 1690 (repealed)	2 Will. & Mar. Sess. 2. c. 5	20 December 1690
An Act for the Continuance of severall former Acts (Note: Taxation (Wine and Vinegar) Act 1685 (1 Ja. 2. c. 3)) (Note: Taxation (Tobacco and Sugar) Act 1685 (1 Ja. 2. c. 4)) therein mentioned for the laying severall Duties upon Wines Vinegar and Tobacco. (Repealed by Statute Law Revision Act 1867 (30 & 31 Vict. c. 59))
Mutiny Act 1690 (repealed)	2 Will. & Mar. Sess. 2. c. 6	20 December 1690
An Act for Punishing Officers and Soldiers who shall mutiny or desert their Majestyes Service and for punishing false Musters. (Repealed by Statute Law Revision Act 1867 (30 & 31 Vict. c. 59))
Coals Act 1690 (repealed)	2 Will. & Mar. Sess. 2. c. 7	20 December 1690
An Act for Reviveing a former Act (Note: Coal Trade, London Act 1664 (16 & 17 Cha. 2. c. 2)) for Regulating the Measures and Prices of Coales. (Repealed by Statute Law Revision Act 1867 (30 & 31 Vict. c. 59))
London Streets, etc. Act 1690 (repealed)	2 Will. & Mar. Sess. 2. c. 8	20 December 1690
An Act for Paveing and Cleansing the Streets in the Cityes of London and Westminster and Suburbs and Liberties thereof and Out-Parishes in the County of Midlesex and in the Burrough of Southwarke and other places within the Weekly Bills of Mortality in the County of Surrey and for Regulating the Markets therein mentioned. (Repealed by Highways (No. 2) Act 1766 (7 Geo. 3. c. 42), Paving, etc., of London Act 1768 (8 Geo. 3. c. 21), City of London Sewerage Act 1771 (11 Geo. 3. c. 29), Hay and Straw Act 1796 (36 Geo. 3. c. 88) and Statute Law Revision Act 1948 (11 & 12 Geo. 6. c. 62))
Taxation (No. 5) Act 1690 (repealed)	2 Will. & Mar. Sess. 2. c. 9	5 January 1691
An Act for the Encourageing the Distilling of Brandy and Spirits from Come and for laying severall Dutyes on Low Wines or Spirits of the first Extraction. (Repealed by Statute Law Revision Act 1867 (30 & 31 Vict. c. 59))
Taxation (No. 6) Act 1690 (repealed)	2 Will. & Mar. Sess. 2. c. 10	5 January 1691
An Act for Granting to their Majesties severall Additional Duties of Excise upon Beere Ale and other Liquors for foure yeares from the time that an Act for doubling the Duty of Excise upon Beere Ale and other Liquors dureing the space of one yeare doth expire. (Repealed by Statute Law Revision Act 1867 (30 & 31 Vict. c. 59))
Public Accounts Act 1690 (repealed)	2 Will. & Mar. Sess. 2. c. 11	5 January 1691
An Act for Appointing and Enabling Commissioners to Examine Take and State the Publicke Accounts of the Kingdome. (Repealed by Statute Law Revision Act 1867 (30 & 31 Vict. c. 59))
Militia Act 1690 (repealed)	2 Will. & Mar. Sess. 2. c. 12	5 January 1691
An Act for raising the Militia of this Kingdom for the Year One Thousand Six Hundred Ninety and One, although the Month's Pay formerly advanced be not re paid. (Repealed by Statute Law Revision Act 1867 (30 & 31 Vict. c. 59))
Indemnity Act 1690 (repealed)	2 Will. & Mar. Sess. 2. c. 13	5 January 1691
An Act for preventing Vexatious Suites against such as acted for Their Majestyes Service in defence of the Kingdome. (Repealed by Statute Law Revision Act 1867 (30 & 31 Vict. c. 59))
Trade with France Act 1690 (repealed)	2 Will. & Mar. Sess. 2. c. 14	5 January 1691
An Act for the more effectuall puting in Execution an Act Entituled "An Act for Prohibiting all Trade and Commerce with France". (Note: Trade with France Act 1688 (1 Will. & Mar. c. 34)) (Repealed by Statute Law Revision Act 1867 (30 & 31 Vict. c. 59))
Insolvent Debtors Relief Act 1690 (repealed)	2 Will. & Mar. Sess. 2. c. 15	5 January 1691
An Act for Reliefe of poore Prisoners for Debt or Damages. (Repealed by Statute Law Revision Act 1867 (30 & 31 Vict. c. 59))

=== Private acts ===
Short title	Citation	Royal assent
Long title
Francis Phelips' Estate Act 1690	2 Will. & Mar. Sess. 2. c. 1 Pr.	10 November 1690
An Act for enabling the Sale of the Manor of Kempton and Kempton-Parke, and other Lands late of Francis Phelipps Esquire deceased.
Enabling Dacres Barrett or Lennard to charge the reversion of his estate with £1500.	2 Will. & Mar. Sess. 2. c. 2 Pr.	10 November 1690
An Act to enable Dacres Barret, alias Lennard, Esquire, to charge the Reversion of his Estate in England with the Sum of Fifteen Hundred Pounds.
Marlborough (Wiltshire) Thatched Roofs Prohibition Act 1690	2 Will. & Mar. Sess. 2. c. 3 Pr.	18 November 1690
An Act to prohibit the covering of Houses and other Buildings with Thatch or Straw, in the Town of Marleborough, in the County of Wilts.
George Vilet's Estate Act 1690	2 Will. & Mar. Sess. 2. c. 4 Pr.	18 November 1690
An Act to vest the Manor and Lands late of George Vilet Esquire in Trustees, to be sold, for raising Portions for his Daughters.
David Bigg's Estate Act 1690	2 Will. & Mar. Sess. 2. c. 5 Pr.	18 November 1690
An Act to vest divers Messuages and Tenements (the Estate of David Bigg Esquire) in Trustees, to be sold; and for laying out the Money to be raised thereby in the Purchase of Lands more to his Convenience, to be settled to the same Uses.
Enabling Elizabeth Mountague to lease houses and ground in Stepney (Middlesex).	2 Will. & Mar. Sess. 2. c. 6 Pr.	25 November 1690
An Act to enable Elizabeth Montagu Widow to make Leases for Years of Houses and Grounds in Stepney, in the County of Midd'x.
To give Katherine Lady Cornbury powers to act as if she were full age.	2 Will. & Mar. Sess. 2. c. 7 Pr.	20 December 1690
An Act to give Katherine Lady Cornbury certain Powers to act, as if she were of full Age.
Limiting the powers of James Earl of Salisbury to cut off the entail of his estate.	2 Will. & Mar. Sess. 2. c. 8 Pr.	20 December 1690
An Act for the limiting the Power of James now Earl of Salisbury to cut off the Entail of his Estate.
Mary Wharton and James Campbell Marriage Annulment Act 1690	2 Will. & Mar. Sess. 2. c. 9 Pr.	20 December 1690
An Act to annul and make void a Marriage between Mary Wharton an Infant and James Campbell Esquire.
Sir Samuel Bernardiston's Estate Act 1690	2 Will. & Mar. Sess. 2. c. 10 Pr.	20 December 1690
An Act to free the Estate of Sir Samuell Bernadiston from several Incumbrances, occasioned by a Judgement given against him upon an Information in the Court of King's Bench.
Richard Cooke's Estate Act 1690	2 Will. & Mar. Sess. 2. c. 11 Pr.	20 December 1690
An Act for the enabling of Trustees to sell certain Lands of Richard Cooke deceased, to pay Debts, and for raising a Portion for his Daughter.
John Baines' Estate Act 1690	2 Will. & Mar. Sess. 2. c. 12 Pr.	20 December 1690
An Act for the vesting several Messuages and Tenements in the City of London (late the Estate of John Baynes Gentleman, deceased,) in Trustees, to be sold, for Payment of Debts.
Naturalization of Francis de la Chambre and others.	2 Will. & Mar. Sess. 2. c. 13 Pr.	20 December 1690
An Act for naturalizing of Francis De la Chambre and others.
Nicholas Bagnall's Estate (Ireland) Act 1690	2 Will. & Mar. Sess. 2. c. 14 Pr.	20 December 1690
An Act to bar a Remainder limited to Dudley Bagnall Esquire in the Estate of Nicholas Bagnell Esquire in Ireland.
Saint Leger Scroope's Estate Act 1690	2 Will. & Mar. Sess. 2. c. 15 Pr.	20 December 1690
An Act for vesting divers Lands in Trustees, to be sold, for the Payment of certain Debts of St. Leger Scroope Esquire, deceased.
Reginald Bray's Estate Act 1690	2 Will. & Mar. Sess. 2. c. 16 Pr.	20 December 1690
An Act for the better enabling Jane Bray Widow, Relict and sole Executrix of the last Will of Reginald Bray Esquire, deceased, and others, to the speedier raising of the Portions already appointed for her Daughters by the said Reginald Bray.
Sale of Henry Serve's Estate Act 1690	2 Will. & Mar. Sess. 2. c. 17 Pr.	20 December 1690
An Act for selling the Estate of Henry Serle Esquire, deceased.
Robert Ask's Charity Act 1690 or the Haberdashers' Aske's Charity Act 1690	2 Will. & Mar. Sess. 2. c. 18 Pr.	20 December 1690
An Act for settling a Charity given by Robert Aske Esquire to the Company of Haberdashers of London.
Securing the portion of Elizabeth Lucy, breeding her up a Protestant and transferring the trust for that purpose.	2 Will. & Mar. Sess. 2. c. 19 Pr.	20 December 1690
An Act for securing the Portion of Elizabeth Lucy, and breeding her up a Protestant, and for transferring the Trust for that Purpose.
Thomas Williams' Estate Act 1690	2 Will. & Mar. Sess. 2. c. 20 Pr.	20 December 1690
An Act for raising Money out of the Estate of Thomas Williams Esquire, deceased, by letting Leases and otherwise, for the more speedy Payment of his Debts.
Enabling Philip Hildeyard to sell lands in Surrey and to settle lands in Lincolnshire in lieu.	2 Will. & Mar. Sess. 2. c. 21 Pr.	20 December 1690
An Act to enable Philip Hildeyard Esquire to sell Lands in Surrey, and to settle Lands in Lincolneshire in Lieu thereof.
Enabling Thomas Earl of Aylesbury and Elizabeth Countess of Aylesbury to make provision for payment of debts and to lease their estates.	2 Will. & Mar. Sess. 2. c. 22 Pr.	5 January 1691
An Act to enable Thomas Earl of Aylisbury and Elizabeth Countess of Aylisbury his Wife to make Provision for Payment of Debts, and to make Leases of their Estates.
Enabling Thomas Sheafe to sell lands for payment of debts and making provision for his wife.	2 Will. & Mar. Sess. 2. c. 23 Pr.	20 December 1690
An Act to enable Thomas Sheafe to sell Lands, for Payment of Debts, and making Provision for his Wife, according to an Agreement for that Purpose.
York Buildings Waterworks Act 1690	2 Will. & Mar. Sess. 2. c. 24 Pr.	5 January 1691
An Act for incorporating the Proprietors of the Water-works in Yorke Buildings, and for the encouraging, carrying on, and settling, the said Waterworks.
Thomas Manwaring's Estate Act 1690	2 Will. & Mar. Sess. 2. c. 25 Pr.	5 January 1691
An Act for vesting certain Lands (the Estate of Thomas Manwareing Gentleman) in Trustees, to be sold, for the Payment of Debts.
Enabling John Rosseter to sell lands for payment of debts.	2 Will. & Mar. Sess. 2. c. 26 Pr.	5 January 1691
An Act to enable John Rosseter Esquire to sell Lands, for Payment of Debts.

=== Sources ===
- Raithby, John, ed. (1963) [1819]. "2° Gul. & Mar. Sess. 2". Statutes of the Realm. Vol. 6: The Statutes of King James II, and King William and Queen Mary (1685–1694). London: Dawsons. pp. 180–250 – via HathiTrust.
- Raithby, John, ed. (1819). Statutes of the Realm. Vol. 6: 1685-94 – via British History Online.
- Pickering, Danby, ed. (1764). "Sessio Secundo. Anno secundo Gulielmi & Mariæ". The Statutes at Large. Vol. 9: From the First Year of K. William and Q. Mary to Eighth Year of K. William III – 1688 to 1695–96. Cambridge: Joseph Bentham. pp. 85–128 – via Internet Archive.
- Pickering, Danby, ed. (1764). "Sessio Secundo. Anno secundo Gulielmi & Mariæ". The Statutes at Large. Vol. 9: From the First Year of K. William and Q. Mary to Eighth Year of K. William III – 1688 to 1695–96. Cambridge: Joseph Bentham. pp. 85–128 – via Internet Archive.
- Journals of the House of Commons. Vol. 10. London: His Majesty's Stationery Office. 1803. pp. 425–538 – via Google Books.
- Journal of the House of Lords. Vol. 14: 1685-1691. London: His Majesty's Stationery Office. 1830. pp. 513–621 – via British History Online.
- Chronological Table of and Index to the Statutes. Vol. 1: To the End of the Session 59 Vict. Sess. 2 (1895) (13th ed.). London: Her Majesty's Stationery Office. 1896. p. 75 – via Google Books.
- Chronological Table of the Statutes: Covering the Period from 1235 to the End of 1971. London: Her Majesty's Stationery Office. 1972. p. 73. ISBN 978-0-11-840096-1 – via Google Books.
- "Chronological Tables of the Private and Personal Acts: Part 4 (1685–1694)". legislation.gov.uk. The National Archives.

== See also ==
- List of acts of the Parliament of England
