= Estreats (Personal Representatives) Act 1692 =

Act of the Parliament of England

- Act of Parliament
- Parliament of England
- Long title: An Act for reviving continuing and explaining several Laws therein mentioned that are expired and neare expiring.
- Citation: 4 Will. & Mar. c. 24
- Territorial extent: England and Wales

Dates
- Royal assent: 14 March 1693
- Commencement: 13 February 1692 (Note: Section 1.)
- Repealed: 30 July 1948
Other legislation
Amends	See § Revived and continued enactments.
Amended by	Perpetuation and Amendment of Laws Act 1704; Continuance of Laws Act 1722
Repealed by	Statute Law Revision Act 1867; Administration of Estates Act 1925; Statute Law Revision Act 1948
Relates to	Coinage Act 1672; Coinage Act 1685; Administration of Intestates' Estate Act 1685; Continuance of Laws Act 1694; See Expiring laws continuance acts

Status: Repealed

Text of statute as originally enacted

The Estreats (Personal Representatives) Act 1692 (4 Will. & Mar. c. 24) was an act of the Parliament of England that continued various older acts.

== Background ==
In the United Kingdom, acts of Parliament remain in force until expressly repealed. Many acts of parliament, however, contained time-limited sunset clauses, requiring legislation to revive enactments that had expired or to continue enactments that would otherwise expire.

== Provisions ==
=== Revived and continued enactments ===
Section 1 of the act revived and continued the Navy and Ordnance Act 1662 (13 & 14 Cha. 2. c. 20) until the end of the next session of parliament after 7 years from 13 February 1692.

Section 2 of the act revived and continued the Coin Act 1666 (18 Cha. 2. c. 5), as continued by the Coinage Act 1672 (25 Cha. 2. c. 8) and revived by the Coinage Act 1685 (1 Ja. 2. c. 7), until the end of the next session of parliament after 7 years from 13 February 1692.

Section 3 of the act made the Fines and Forfeitures Act 1670 (22 & 23 Cha. 2. c. 22), as continued by the Administration of Intestates' Estate Act 1685 (1 Ja. 2. c. 17), perpetual.

Section 4 of the act updated the oath to be given upon return of estreats.

Section 5 of the act continued the Tobacco Planting and Plantation Trade Act 1670 (22 & 23 Cha. 2. c. 26), as continued by the Administration of Intestates' Estate Act 1685 (1 Ja. 2. c. 17), until the end of the next session of parliament after 7 years from 13 February 1692.

Section 6 of the act continued the Exchequer Orders Act 1667 (19 & 20 Cha. 2. c. 4), as continued by the Administration of Intestates' Estate Act 1685 (1 Ja. 2. c. 17), until the end of the next session of parliament after 7 years from 13 February 1692.

Section 7 of the act continued the Navy Act 1670 (22 & 23 Cha. 2. c. 23), as continued by the Administration of Intestates' Estate Act 1685 (1 Ja. 2. c. 17), until the end of the next session of parliament after 7 years from 13 February 1692.

Section 8 of the act continued the Sale of Cattle Act 1670 (22 & 23 Cha. 2. c. 19), as continued and amended by the Administration of Intestates' Estate Act 1685 (1 Ja. 2. c. 17), until the end of the next session of parliament after 7 years from 13 February 1692.

Section 9 of the act continued the Woollen Manufactures Act 1688 (1 Will. & Mar. Sess. 1. c. 32. c. 19) until the end of the next session of parliament after 7 years from 13 February 1692, provided that no wool could be imported from Ireland to Exeter.

Section 10 of the act continued the Poor Relief Act 1662 (13 & 14 Cha. 2. c. 12), as continued and amended by the Administration of Intestates' Estate Act 1685 (1 Ja. 2. c. 17) and the Poor Relief Act 1691 (3 Will. & Mar. c. 11), until the end of the next session of parliament after 7 years from 13 February 1692.

Section 11 of the act made the Executors of Executors (Waste) Act 1678 (30 Cha. 2. c. 7), as continued by the Administration of Intestates' Estate Act 1685 (1 Ja. 2. c. 17), perpetual.

Section 12 of the act provided that under the Executors of Executors (Waste) Act 1678 (30 Cha. 2. c. 7), devastavit lies against executors, or administrators of executors, or administrators by right.

Section 13 of the act provided that women would have benefit of clergy only once under section 6 of the Benefit of Clergy, etc. Act 1691(3 Will. & Mar. c. 9).

Section 14 of the act continued the Benefit of Clergy, etc. Act 1691(3 Will. & Mar. c. 9) until the end of the next session of parliament after 3 years from 13 February 1692.

Section 15 of the act continued the Licensing of the Press Act 1662 (13 & 14 Cha. 2. c. 33), as continued by the Administration of Intestates' Estate Act 1685 (1 Ja. 2. c. 17), until the end of the next session of parliament after 1 year from 13 February 1692 (25 April 1694).

Sections 16 to 23 of the act made transitory provisions following the expiry of the Juries Act 1664 (16 & 17 Cha. 2. c. 3), to last until the end of the next session of parliament after 3 years from 1 May 1693.

== Subsequent developments ==
Section 1 of the Continuance of Laws Act 1694 (6 & 7 Will. & Mar. c. 14) made the Benefit of Clergy, etc. Act 1691 (3 Will. & Mar. c. 9), as continued by this act, perpetual.

So much of the act as relates to jurors, and to the returns and service of jurors was continued until the end of the next session of parliament after 3 years from the expiration of those enactments by the Continuance of Laws Act 1722 (9 Geo. 1. c. 8).

The Select Committee on Temporary Laws, Expired or Expiring, appointed in 1796, inspected and considered all temporary laws, observing irregularities in the construction of expiring laws continuance acts, making recommendations and emphasising the importance of the Committee for Expired and Expiring Laws.

The whole act, except sections 4 and 12, was repealed by section 1 of, and the schedule to, the Statute Law Revision Act 1867 (30 & 31 Vict. c. 59), which came into force on 15 July 1867.

Section 12 of the act was repealed by section 56 of, and part I of the second schedule to, the Administration of Estates Act 1925 (15 & 16 Geo. 5. c. 23), which came into force on 1 January 1926.

Section 4 of the act was repealed by section 1 of, and the first schedule to, the Statute Law Revision Act 1948 (11 & 12 Geo. 6. c. 62), which came into force on 30 July 1948.
