= Coinage Act 1685 =

Act of the Parliament of England

- Act of Parliament
- Parliament of England
- Long title: An Act for Reviveing and continuing Two former Acts for Encouragement of Coynage.
- Citation: 1 Ja. 2. c. 7
- Territorial extent: England and Wales

Dates
- Royal assent: 27 June 1685
- Commencement: 1 August 1685 (Note: Section 1.)
- Repealed: 29 July 1863
Other legislation
Amends	Coin Act 1666; Coinage Act 1672
Repealed by	Statute Law Revision Act 1863
Relates to	Estreats (Personal Representatives) Act 1692; Taxation Act 1700; Coinage Act 1708

Status: Repealed

Text of statute as originally enacted

The Coinage Act 1685 (1 Ja. 2. c. 7) was an act of the Parliament of England that revived and continued the Coin Act 1666 (18 & 19 Cha. 2. c. 5) and the Coinage Act 1672 (25 Cha. 2. c. 8) for 7 years.

== Provisions ==
Section 1 of the act revived and continued the Coin Act 1666 (18 & 19 Cha. 2. c. 5) and the Coinage Act 1672 (25 Cha. 2. c. 8) until the end of the first session of the next parliament 7 years after 1 August 1685.

== Subsequent developments ==
Section 2 of the Estreats (Personal Representatives) Act 1692 (4 Will. & Mar. c. 24) revived and continued the Coin Act 1666 (18 Cha. 2. c. 5), as continued by the Coinage Act 1672 (25 Cha. 2. c. 8), revived and continued by the act, until the end of the next session of parliament after 7 years from 13 February 1692.

Section 12 of the Taxation Act 1700 (12 & 13 Will. 3. c. 11) continued the Coin Act 1666 (18 Cha. 2. c. 5), as continued by the Coinage Act 1672 (25 Cha. 2. c. 8) and revived and continued by the act and continued by the Estreats (Personal Representatives) Act 1692 (4 Will. & Mar. c. 24), until the end of the next session of parliament after 7 years from 1 June 1701.

Section 1 of the Coinage Act 1708 (7 Ann. c. 24) continued the Coin Act 1666 (18 Cha. 2. c. 5), as continued by the Coinage Act 1672 (25 Cha. 2. c. 8) and revived and continued by the act, continued by the Estreats (Personal Representatives) Act 1692 (4 Will. & Mar. c. 24) and continued by the Taxation Act 1700 (12 & 13 Will. 3. c. 11), until the end of the next session of parliament after 7 years from 1 March 1708.

The whole act was repealed by section 1 of, and the schedule to, the Statute Law Revision Act 1863 (26 & 27 Vict. c. 125), which came into force on 28 July 1863.
