= Continuance of Laws Act 1694 =

Act of the Parliament of England

- Act of Parliament
- Parliament of the United Kingdom
- Long title: An Act for continuing several Laws therein mentioned.
- Citation: 6 & 7 Will. & Mar. c. 14
- Introduced by: Edmund Waller (Commons)
- Territorial extent: England and Wales

Dates
- Royal assent: 22 April 1695
- Commencement: 12 November 1694 (Note: Start of session.)
- Repealed: 15 July 1867
Other legislation
Amends	Benefit of Clergy, etc. Act 1691; Fraudulent Devises Act 1691
Repealed by	Statute Law Revision Act 1867
Relates to	Licensing of the Press Act 1662; Estreats (Personal Representatives) Act 1692; See Expiring laws continuance acts

Status: Repealed

Text of statute as originally enacted

The Continuance of Laws Act 1694 (6 & 7 Will. & Mar. c. 14) was an act of the Parliament of England that continued and made perpetual various older acts.

== Background ==
In the United Kingdom, acts of Parliament remain in force until expressly repealed. Many acts of parliament, however, contained time-limited sunset clauses, requiring legislation to revive enactments that had expired or to continue enactments that would otherwise expire.

== Passage ==
Following the expiry of the Licensing of the Press Act 1662 (14 Cha. 2. c. 33) (Note: This is the citation in The Statutes of the Realm) in 1694, a committee was appointed on 30 November 1964 to inspect laws "lately expired and expiring which are fit to be revived and continued". The committee was enlarged on 3 January 1695.

The committee reported on 9 January 1695, resolving:

- To continue the Benefit of Clergy, etc. Act 1691 (3 Will. & Mar. c. 9), as continued by the Estreats (Personal Representatives) Act 1692 (4 Will. & Mar. c. 24)
- To continue the Licensing of the Press Act 1662 (14 Cha. 2. c. 33), as revived and continued by the Administration of Intestates' Estate Act 1685 (1 Ja. 2. c. 17) and as continued by the Estreats (Personal Representatives) Act 1692 (4 Will. & Mar. c. 24)
- To continue the Fraudulent Devises Act 1691 (3 Will. & Mar. c. 14)
- To continue the Judgment Act 1692 (4 Will. & Mar. c. 20)

On 11 February 1662, the revival of the Licensing of the Press Act 1662 (14 Cha. 2. c. 33) was rejected by the Commons, without division, and a bill was ordered to be brought in by Edmund Waller.

The Continuation Bill had its first reading in the House of Commons on 25 January 1695, presented by Edmund Waller. The bill had its second reading in the House of Commons on 21 March 1695 and was committed to a select committee, which reported on 26 March 1695, with amendments agreed to by the House. The amended bill had its third reading in the House of Commons on 29 March 1695, without amendments.

The bill had its first reading in the House of Lords on 29 March 1695. The bill had its second reading in the House of Lords on 30 March 1695 and was committed to a committee of the whole house, which met and reported on 3 April 1695, with amendments. The amended bill had its third reading in the House of Lords on 8 April 1695 and passed, without amendments.

The amended bill was returned to the House of Commons on 8 April 1695. The amendments, except for the continuation of the Licensing of the Press Act 1662 (14 Cha. 2. c. 33), were agreed to by the Commons on 17 April 1865, with detailed reasons expressing concerns about penalties under the act and the monopoly by the Company of Stationers. At a conference on 18 April 1695, the Lords allowed the bill to proceed without renewing the 1662 act. The Lords waived their amendments on 19 April 1695.

The amended bill was granted royal assent on 22 April 1695.

== Provisions ==
=== Continued enactments ===
Section 1 of the act made the Benefit of Clergy, etc. Act 1691 (3 Will. & Mar. c. 9), as continued by the Estreats (Personal Representatives) Act 1692 (4 Will. & Mar. c. 24), perpetual.

Section 2 of the act made the Fraudulent Devises Act 1691 (3 Will. & Mar. c. 14) perpetual.

Section 3 of the act continued the Judgment Act 1692 (4 Will. & Mar. c. 20) until the end of the next session of parliament after 1 year from the expiry of that act (which was the end of the next session of parliament after 25 March 1693).

== Subsequent developments ==
The Select Committee on Temporary Laws, Expired or Expiring, appointed in 1796, inspected and considered all temporary laws, observing irregularities in the construction of expiring laws continuance acts, making recommendations and emphasising the importance of the Committee for Expired and Expiring Laws.

The whole act was repealed by section 1 of, and the schedule to, the Statute Law Revision Act 1867 (30 & 31 Vict. c. 59), which came into force on 15 July 1867.
