= List of acts of the Parliament of England from 1692 =

This is a list of acts of the Parliament of England for the year 1692.

For acts passed during the period 1707–1800, see the list of acts of the Parliament of Great Britain. See also the list of acts of the Parliament of Scotland, and the list of acts of the Parliament of Ireland.

For acts passed from 1801 onwards, see the list of acts of the Parliament of the United Kingdom. For acts of the devolved parliaments and assemblies in the United Kingdom, see the list of acts of the Scottish Parliament, the list of acts of the Northern Ireland Assembly, and the list of acts and measures of Senedd Cymru; see also the list of acts of the Parliament of Northern Ireland.

For medieval statutes, etc. that are not considered to be acts of Parliament, see the list of English statutes.

See also the List of ordinances and acts of the Parliament of England, 1642–1660 for ordinances and acts passed by the Long Parliament and other bodies without royal assent, and which were not considered to be valid legislation following the Restoration in 1660.

The number shown after each act's title is its chapter number. Acts are cited using this number, preceded by the years of the reign during which the relevant parliamentary session was held; thus the Union with Ireland Act 1800 is cited as "39 & 40 Geo. 3. c. 67", meaning the 67th act passed during the session that started in the 39th year of the reign of George III and which finished in the 40th year of that reign. The modern convention is to use Arabic numerals in citations (thus "41 Geo. 3" rather than "41 Geo. III"). Acts of the last session of the Parliament of Great Britain and the first session of the Parliament of the United Kingdom are both cited as "41 Geo. 3".

Acts passed by the Parliament of England did not have a short title; however, some of these acts have subsequently been given a short title by acts of the Parliament of the United Kingdom, such as the Short Titles Act 1896 (59 & 60 Vict. c. 14).

Acts passed by the Parliament of England were deemed to have come into effect on the first day of the session in which they were passed. Because of this, the years given in the list below may in fact be the year before a particular act was passed.

== 4 Will. & Mar. ==
The fourth session of the 2nd Parliament of William and Mary, which met from 4 November 1692 until 14 March 1693.

This session was also traditionally cited as 4 Will. & Mary, 4 Gul. & Mar., 4 Gul. et Mar., 4 W. & M., 4 & 5 Will. & Mar., 4 & 5 Will. & Mary, 4 & 5 Gul. & Mar., 4 & 5 Gul. et Mar., 4 & 5 W. & M.

=== Public acts ===
Short title	Citation	Royal assent
Long title
Land Tax Act 1692 (repealed)	4 Will. & Mar. c. 1	20 January 1693
An Act for granting to Their Majesties an Aid of Foure Shillings in the Pound for One yeare for carrying on a vigorous War against France. (Note: The Nine Years' War.) (Repealed by Statute Law Revision Act 1867 (30 & 31 Vict. c. 59))
Wills Act 1692 (repealed)	4 Will. & Mar. c. 2	20 January 1693
An Act for that the Inhabitants of the province of York may dispose of their personal Estates by their Wills notwithstanding the Custom of that province. (Repealed by Statute Law Revision Act 1867 (30 & 31 Vict. c. 59))
Taxation, etc. Act 1692 (repealed)	4 Will. & Mar. c. 3	26 January 1693
An Act for granting to Their Majesties certain Rates and Duties of Excise upon Beer Ale and other Liquors for secureing certain Recompences and Advantages in the said Act mencioned to such Persons as shall voluntarily advance the Summe of Ten hundred thousand Pounds towards carrying on the War against France. (Repealed by Statute Law Revision Act 1867 (30 & 31 Vict. c. 59))
Special Bail Act 1692 (repealed)	4 Will. & Mar. c. 4	26 January 1693
An Act for takeing Special Bails in the Countrey upon Actions and Suites depending in the Courts of Kings Bench Common Pleas and Exchequer att Westminster. (Repealed by Supreme Court of Judicature (Consolidation) Act 1925 (15 & 16 Geo. 5. c. 49))
Taxation Act 1692 (repealed)	4 Will. & Mar. c. 5	14 March 1693
An Act for granting to Their Majesties certain additional Impositions upon several Goods and Merchandize for the prosecuting the present War against France. (Repealed by Statute Law Revision Act 1867 (30 & 31 Vict. c. 59))
Militia Act 1692 (repealed)	4 Will. & Mar. c. 6	14 March 1693
An Act for raising the Militia of this Kingdom for the yeare One thousand six hundred ninety & three although the Months Pay formerly advanced be not repaid. (Repealed by Statute Law Revision Act 1867 (30 & 31 Vict. c. 59))
Cheese and Butter Trade Act 1692 (repealed)	4 Will. & Mar. c. 7	14 March 1693
An Act to prevent Abuses committed by the Traders in Butter and Cheese. (Repealed by Butter and Cheese Trade Act 1844 (7 & 8 Vict. c. 48))
Apprehension of Highwaymen Act 1692 (repealed)	4 Will. & Mar. c. 8	14 March 1693
An Act for encourageing the apprehending of Highway Men. (Repealed by Criminal Law Act 1826 (7 Geo. 4. c. 64))
Hertfordshire Highways Act 1692 (repealed)	4 Will. & Mar. c. 9	14 March 1693
An Act for reviving two former Acts of Parliament (Note: Road Repair (Hertfordshire, Cambridgeshire, and Huntingdonshire) Act 1663 (15 Cha. 2. c. 1)) (Note: Highways (Hertford) Act 1664 (16 & 17 Cha. 2. c. 10)) for the repaireing the Highways in the County of Hertford. (Repealed by Hertfordshire Roads Act 1732 (6 Geo. 2. c. 24))
Importation Act 1692 (repealed)	4 Will. & Mar. c. 10	14 March 1693
An Act for prohibiting the importation of all Forreigne Haire Buttons. (Repealed by Customs Law Repeal Act 1825 (6 Geo. 4. c. 105))
Public Accounts Act 1692 (repealed)	4 Will. & Mar. c. 11	14 March 1693
An Act for examineing takeing and stateing the publick Accompts of this Kingdom. (Repealed by Statute Law Revision Act 1867 (30 & 31 Vict. c. 59))
Repairs of Church Act 1692 (repealed)	4 Will. & Mar. c. 12	14 March 1693
An Act to make Parishioners of the Church united Contributors to the Repairs and Ornaments of the Church to whome the Union is made. (Repealed with savings by Statute Law Revision Act 1867 (30 & 31 Vict. c. 59))
Mutiny Act 1692 (repealed)	4 Will. & Mar. c. 13	14 March 1693
An Act for punishing Officers and Soldiers who shall mutiny or desert Therr Majesties Service and for punishing False Musters and for the payment of Quarters. (Repealed by Statute Law Revision Act 1867 (30 & 31 Vict. c. 59))
Taxation (No. 2) Act 1692 (repealed)	4 Will. & Mar. c. 14	14 March 1693
An Act for review of the Quarterly Poll granted to Their Majesties in the last Session of this present Parliament. (Repealed by Statute Law Revision Act 1867 (30 & 31 Vict. c. 59))
Taxation (No. 3) Act 1692 (repealed)	4 Will. & Mar. c. 15	14 March 1693
An Act for continueing certain Acts therein mencioned (Note: Taxation (Wine and Vinegar) Act 1685 (1 Ja. 2. c. 3)) (Note: Taxation (Tobacco and Sugar) Act 1685 (1 Ja. 2. c. 4)) (Note: Taxation (Tonnage and Poundage) Act 1689 (2 Will. & Mar. Sess. 2. c. 4)) and for chargeing several Joynt Stocks. (Repealed by Statute Law Revision Act 1867 (30 & 31 Vict. c. 59))
Clandestine Mortgages Act 1692 (repealed)	4 Will. & Mar. c. 16	14 March 1693
An Act to prevent Frauds by Clandestine Mortgages. (Repealed by Law of Property Act 1925 (15 & 16 Geo. 5. c. 20))
Greenland Trade Act 1692 (repealed)	4 Will. & Mar. c. 17	14 March 1693
An Act for the regaining encourageing and settling the Greenland Trade. (Repealed by Statute Law Revision Act 1867 (30 & 31 Vict. c. 59))
Malicious Information in Court of King's Bench Act 1692 (repealed)	4 Will. & Mar. c. 18	14 March 1693
An Act to prevent malicious Informations in the Court of King's Bench and for the more easie reversal of Outlaries in the same Court. (Repealed by Administration of Justice (Miscellaneous Provisions) Act 1938 (1 & 2 Geo. 6. c. 63))
Indemnity Act 1692 (repealed)	4 Will. & Mar. c. 19	14 March 1693
An Act for preventing Suits against such as acted for Their Majesties Service in Defence of the Kingdom. (Repealed by Statute Law Revision Act 1867 (30 & 31 Vict. c. 59))
Judgment Act 1692 (repealed)	4 Will. & Mar. c. 20	14 March 1693
An Act for the better discovery of Judgments in the Courts of Kings Bench Common Pleas & Exchequer att Westminster. (Repealed by Statute Law Revision Act 1867 (30 & 31 Vict. c. 59))
Pleadings in Actions Act 1692 (repealed)	4 Will. & Mar. c. 21	14 March 1693
An Act for delivering Declaracions to Prisoners. (Repealed by Statute Law Revision Act 1867 (30 & 31 Vict. c. 59))
Crown Office Procedure Act 1692 (repealed)	4 Will. & Mar. c. 22	14 March 1693
An Act for regulateing Proceedings in the Crowne Office of the Court of King's Bench att Westminster. (Repealed by Administration of Justice (Miscellaneous Provisions) Act 1938 (1 & 2 Geo. 6. c. 63))
Game Act 1692 (repealed)	4 Will. & Mar. c. 23	14 March 1693
An Act for the more easie discoverie and conviction of such as shall destroy the Game of this Kingdome. (Repealed by Game Act 1831 (1 & 2 Will. 4. c. 32))
Estreats (Personal Representatives) Act 1692 (repealed)	4 Will. & Mar. c. 24	14 March 1693
An Act for reviving continuing and explaining several Laws therein mentioned that are expired and neare expiring. (Note: Poor Relief Act 1662 (14 Cha. 2. c. 12)) (Note: Navy and Ordnance Act 1662 (14 Cha. 2. c. 20)) (Note: Licensing of the Press Act 1662 (14 Cha. 2. c. 33)) (Note: Coin Act 1666 (18 & 19 Cha. 2. c. 5)) (Note: Exchequer Orders Act 1667 (19 & 20 Cha. 2. c. 4)) (Note: Sale of Cattle Act 1670 (22 & 23 Cha. 2. c. 19)) (Note: Fines and Forfeitures Act 1670 (22 & 23 Cha. 2. c. 22)) (Note: Navy Act 1670 (22 & 23 Cha. 2. c. 23)) (Note: Tobacco Planting and Plantation Trade Act 1670 (22 & 23 Cha. 2. c. 26)) (Note: Executors of Executors (Waste) Act 1678 (30 Cha. 2. c. 7)) (Note: Woollen Manufactures Act 1688 (1 Will. & Mar. c. 32)) (Note: Benefit of Clergy, etc. Act 1691 (3 Will. & Mar. c. 9)) (Repealed by Statute Law Revision Act 1867 (30 & 31 Vict. c. 59), Administration of Estates Act 1925 (15 & 16 Geo. 5. c. 23) and Statute Law Revision Act 1948 (11 & 12 Geo. 6. c. 62))
Trade with France Act 1692 or the Prize Act 1692 (repealed)	4 Will. & Mar. c. 25	14 March 1693
An Act for continuing the Acts For prohibiting all Trade and Commerce with France and for the encouragement of Privateers. (Note: Trade with France Act 1688 (1 Will. & Mar. c. 34)) (Note: Trade with France Act 1690 (2 Will. & Mar. Sess. 2. c. 14)) (Repealed by Statute Law Revision Act 1867 (30 & 31 Vict. c. 59))

=== Private acts ===
Short title	Citation	Royal assent
Long title
Anthony Eyre's Estate Act 1692	4 Will. & Mar. c. 1 Pr.	20 January 1693
An Act for the Sale of the Estate of Anthony Eyre Esquire, deceased, for Payment of his Debts, and Portions for his Children.
Henry Hawley's Estate Act 1692	4 Will. & Mar. c. 2 Pr.	20 January 1693
An Act for vesting the Estate Real and Personal late of Henry Hawley in Trustees, to be sold, or otherwise disposed, for the Benefit of his Daughters and Heirs Susanna and Mary, who are both Minors.
Lincolnshire, Berkshire and Devon Estates Act 1692	4 Will. & Mar. c. 3 Pr.	20 January 1693
An Act for clearing and removing some Doubts which may arise in an Act of Parliament, intituled, "An Act for the vesting several Manors, Lands, and Rents, in the Counties of Lincolne, Berks, and Devon, in Trustees, to be sold, for the buying other Manors and Lands, to be settled for the same or the like Uses as those to be sold are now settled." (Note: Lincolnshire, Berkshire and Devon Estates Act 1691 (3 Will. & Mar. c. 33 Pr.))
Enabling Sir John Wentworth (an infant) to make a jointure out of and settle his manors and lands in Yorkshire, York and Westmorland.	4 Will. & Mar. c. 4 Pr.	20 January 1693
An Act to enable Sir John Wentworth Baronet, an Infant under the Age of One and Twenty Years, to make a Jointure out and Settlement of his Manors and Lands, in the Counties of Yorke, in the County of the City of Yorke, and Westmorland.
Sir Anthony Browne's Estate Act 1692	4 Will. & Mar. c. 5 Pr.	20 January 1693
An Act for the more speedy and effectual Execution of the Trust created by the Will of Sir Anthony Browne Baronet, deceased, and of a Decree in Chancery thereupon.
Alexander Popham's Estate Act 1692	4 Will. & Mar. c. 6 Pr.	20 January 1693
An Act to enable Alexander Popham Esquire to settle a Jointure upon his Wife, and make Provision for Younger Children, upon Receipt of Twelve Thousand Pounds Portion, to be applied for Payment of his Debts.
Enabling Sir George Parker to make a marriage settlement despite his minority.	4 Will. & Mar. c. 7 Pr.	20 January 1693
An Act to enable Sir George Parker, of Ratton, in the County of Sussex, Baronet, to make a Settlement upon his Marriage, notwithstanding his Minority.
[[Enabling William Wake and William Wake, Doctor in Divinity, to make leases for lives or years within manor of Shapwick (Dorset).]]	4 Will. & Mar. c. 8 Pr.	20 January 1693
An Act to enable Will'm Wake Gentleman, and William Wake Doctor in Divinity, to make Leases for Lives or Years, within the Manor of Shapwick, in the County of Dorsett.
William Molineux's Estate Act 1692	4 Will. & Mar. c. 9 Pr.	20 January 1693
An Act for the rectifying a Mistake in a certain Act of this present Parliament, passed in the Year One Thousand Six Hundred Ninety-one, intituled, "An Act to vest certain Lands of William Molyneux Gentleman in Trustees, for raising the Sum of Two Thousand Pounds, for paying the Portions to his Younger Brother and Sisters, pursuant to a Decree in the Court of Chancery." (Note: William Molineux's Estate Act 1691 (3 Will. & Mar. c. 23 Pr.))
Sir William Mannock's Estate Act 1692	4 Will. & Mar. c. 10 Pr.	20 January 1693
An Act for the enabling Sir William Mannock Baronet to charge his Estate, for the raising his Younger Children Portions.
Barnham Powel's Estate Act 1692	4 Will. & Mar. c. 11 Pr.	20 January 1693
An Act for the settling of the Manor of Kingsnoth, for the enabling Barnham Powell Esquire to make Provision for his Younger Children.
Ralph Macclesfield's Estate Act 1692	4 Will. & Mar. c. 12 Pr.	26 January 1693
An Act to enable Ralph Macclesfeild to sell Lands, for Payment of Debts, and making Provision for his Wife and Children.
Division of the chapelries of North Chapel and Dungton from the Parish of Petworth (Sussex) and making them new parishes, and settlement of the advowsons of the rectories of Petworth, North Chapel, Dungton, Clewer, Farnham Royal (Buckinghamshire), Worplesdon (Surrey), Kirby, Overblowes and Catton and the vicarage of Long Horsley (Northumberland).	4 Will. & Mar. c. 13 Pr.	14 March 1693
An Act for dividing the Chapelries of North Chappell and Dungton from the Parish of Petworth, and erecting them into new Parishes; and for settling the Advowsons and Rights of Patronage of the Rectories of Petworth, North Chappell, Dungton, Clewer, Farnham Royall, Worplesdon, Kirby Overblows, and Catton, and the Vicarage of Long Horsley.
Francis Osbaston's Estate Act 1692	4 Will. & Mar. c. 14 Pr.	14 March 1693
An Act for the Sale of certain Manors, Messuages, Lands, and Hereditaments, late the Estate of Francis Osbaston Esquire, deceased, for the Payment of his Debts and Legacies, and raising Ten Thousand Pounds for the Portion of Mary Osbaston his Daughter, chargeable upon the said Estate.
Enabling Sir Thomas Wroth to make a jointure and settlement on his marriage and provision for his sister notwithstanding his minority.	4 Will. & Mar. c. 15 Pr.	14 March 1693
An Act to enable Sir Thomas Wroth Baronet to make a Jointure and Settlement upon his Marriage, and to make a Provision for his Sister, notwithstanding his being under the Age of One and Twenty Years.
Anthony Danby's Estate Act 1692	4 Will. & Mar. c. 16 Pr.	14 March 1693
An Act for the settling a Jointure on the Wife of Anthony Danby Esquire, and for making Provision for his Brothers and Younger Children, and for Payment of his Debts.
Confirmation of sale of woodlands in Hampshire and of agreements between Isaac and Richard Wollaston.	4 Will. & Mar. c. 17 Pr.	14 March 1693
An Act for confirming the Sale of certain Wood-lands, in the County of South'ton, and certain Articles of Agreement made between Isaac Woollaston and Richard Woollaston Esquires.
Henry Baynton's Estate Act 1692	4 Will. & Mar. c. 18 Pr.	14 March 1693
An Act for the more speedy and effectual Execution of the Trust created by the Will of Henry Bayntun Esquire, deceased, and for raising a Portion for his Daughter.
Richard Walthall's Estate Act 1692	4 Will. & Mar. c. 19 Pr.	14 March 1693
An Act to enable Richard Walthall Esquire to sell Lands, for the Payment of Portions and Debts.
Better assurance of manor of Woodlands and Hundred of Knoulton to Edward Seymour.	4 Will. & Mar. c. 20 Pr.	14 March 1693
An Act for the better Assurance of the Manor of Woodlands and Hundred of Knolton unto Edward Seymour Esquire.
Pitt's Estate Act 1692	4 Will. & Mar. c. 21 Pr.	14 March 1693
An Act to enable Trustees to sell Part of the Lands and Tenements of Mathew Pitt Esquire and Robert Pitt Gentleman, for the Payment of Debts; and to settle the rest of their Lands upon the said Mathew and Robert, and the Wife of the said Robert, and their Issue.
Viscount Shannon's Estate Act 1692	4 Will. & Mar. c. 22 Pr.	14 March 1693
An Act for settling the Estate of Francis Boyle, Lord Viscount Shannon in the Kingdom of Ireland.
Bishop of Bangor's Estate Act 1692	4 Will. & Mar. c. 23 Pr.	14 March 1693
An Act to enable Humphry Lord Bishop of Bangor to make a Lease of Bangor-house, with the Appurtenances, in the Parish of St. Andrew's Holborne, London, for a competent Term of Years, in order to the new-building and improving the Rent thereof, for the Benefit of his Successors.
Thomas Towers' Estate Act 1692	4 Will. & Mar. c. 24 Pr.	14 March 1693
An Act for vesting the Manors of Barcrofts, otherwise Thonock, otherwise Low Thonock, Hinton, otherwise Hengton, and other Lands, in the County of Lincoln, Isle of Ely, and Counties of Cambridge and Norfolke, in Trustees, for the Payment of the Debts of Thomas Towers Esquire, and making Provision for his Wife and Daughter.
Thomas Goodwin's Estate Act 1692	4 Will. & Mar. c. 25 Pr.	14 March 1693
An Act to enable Thomas Goodwyn the Younger to sell Lands, for the Payment of Debts, and making Provision for his Wife and Children.
Roger Price's Estate Act 1692	4 Will. & Mar. c. 26 Pr.	14 March 1693
An Act to enable Roger Price Esquire to sell some Part of his Estate, for Payment of Portions to the Daughters of John Price Esquire, deceased.
Sir John Williams' Estate Act 1692	4 Will. & Mar. c. 27 Pr.	14 March 1693
An Act to enable Sir John Williams, of Langibby Castle, in the County of Monmouth, Baronet, to sell the Manors of Ewyas Lacy, Waterston, and Trescaillan, and other Lands, in the County of Hereford, and the Manor of Carwent and other Lands in the County of Monmouth, for Payment of Debts.
Sale of Thomas Broomhall's interest in the office of Warden of the Fleet and in 13 adjoining houses and in an office of the custody and keeping of Westminster palace for the better payment of debts.	4 Will. & Mar. c. 28 Pr.	14 March 1693
An Act for the Sale of such Interest as Thomas Bromhall, an Infant, hath in the Office of Warden of The Fleete and in Thirteen Houses adjoining, and in an Office of the Custody and Keeping of the Palace at Westminster, for the more effectual Payment of Debts.
Exchange of lands in Fulham belonging to the Bishopric of London for others belonging to Charles Earl of Monmouth.	4 Will. & Mar. c. 29 Pr.	14 March 1693
An Act for exchanging of several small Parcels of Land in the Parish and Manor of Fulham, belonging to the Bishopric of London, and Part of the Bishopric of London, for other Lands, of the like Value, to Charles Earl of Monmouth and his Heirs.
Naturalization of Henry Sheilbell and others.	4 Will. & Mar. c. 30 Pr.	14 March 1693
An Act for the naturalizing of Henry Sheibell and others.
Settlement and confirmation of manors and lands in Hameldon (Rutlandshire) pursuant to a past agreement for exchanging and inclosing lands there.	4 Will. & Mar. c. 31 Pr.	14 March 1693
An Act for settling and confirming the Manors and Lands in Hameldon, in the County of Rutland, as they are now enjoyed, and have been for divers Years last past, pursuant to an Agreement for enclosing and exchanging of Lands there.
Sir Robert Smith's Estate Act 1692	4 Will. & Mar. c. 32 Pr.	14 March 1693
An Act for the Sale of Lands by Sir Robert Smith; and settling other Lands, of a greater Value, to the same Uses, in Lieu thereof.
Abraham Hinde's Estate Act 1692	4 Will. & Mar. c. 33 Pr.	14 March 1693
An Act for the vesting a Messuage and Lands in Trustees, to be sold, for Payment of the Debts of Abraham Hinde, deceased.
Abel Atwood's Estate Act 1692	4 Will. & Mar. c. 34 Pr.	14 March 1693
An Act to enable Abell Atwood to sell some Lands, to pay Debts, and make Provision for Younger Children.

=== Sources ===
- Raithby, John, ed. (1963) [1819]. "4° Gul. & Mar.". Statutes of the Realm. Vol. 6: The Statutes of King James II, and King William and Queen Mary (1685–1694). London: Dawsons. pp. 323–425 – via HathiTrust.
- Raithby, John, ed. (1819). Statutes of the Realm. Vol. 6: 1685-94 – via British History Online.
- Pickering, Danby, ed. (1764). "Anno quarto Gulielmi & Mariæ". The Statutes at Large. Vol. 9: From the First Year of K. William and Q. Mary to Eighth Year of K. William III – 1688 to 1695–96. Cambridge: Joseph Bentham. pp. 158–174 – via Internet Archive.
- Raithby, John, ed. (1819). Statutes of the Realm. Vol. 6: 1685-94 – via British History Online.
- Pickering, Danby, ed. (1764). "Anno quarto Gulielmi & Mariæ". The Statutes at Large. Vol. 9: From the First Year of K. William and Q. Mary to Eighth Year of K. William III – 1688 to 1695–96. Cambridge: Joseph Bentham. pp. 158–174 – via Internet Archive.
- Pickering, Danby, ed. (1764). "Anno quarto & quinto Gulielmi & Mariæ". The Statutes at Large. Vol. 9: From the First Year of K. William and Q. Mary to Eighth Year of K. William III – 1688 to 1695–96. Cambridge: Joseph Bentham. pp. 174–235 – via Internet Archive.
- Pickering, Danby, ed. (1764). "Anno quarto & quinto Gulielmi & Mariæ". The Statutes at Large. Vol. 9: From the First Year of K. William and Q. Mary to Eighth Year of K. William III – 1688 to 1695–96. Cambridge: Joseph Bentham. pp. 174–235 – via Internet Archive.
- Journals of the House of Commons. Vol. 10. London: His Majesty's Stationery Office. 1803. pp. 696–850 – via Google Books.
- Chronological Table of and Index to the Statutes. Vol. 1: To the End of the Session 59 Vict. Sess. 2 (1895) (13th ed.). London: Her Majesty's Stationery Office. 1896. p. 76 – via Google Books.
- "Chronological Tables of the Private and Personal Acts: Part 4 (1685–1694)". legislation.gov.uk. The National Archives.

== See also ==
- List of acts of the Parliament of England
