= Coinage Act 1672 =

Act of the Parliament of England

- Act of Parliament
- Parliament of England
- Long title: An Act for continuing a former Act concerning Coynage.
- Citation: 25 Cha. 2. c. 8
- Territorial extent: England and Wales

Dates
- Royal assent: 29 March 1673
- Commencement: 4 February 1673 (Note: Start of session.)
- Repealed: 29 July 1863
Other legislation
Amends	Coin Act 1666
Amended by	Coinage Act 1685; Estreats (Personal Representatives) Act 1692; Taxation Act 1700; Coinage Act 1708
Repealed by	Statute Law Revision Act 1863

Status: Repealed

Text of statute as originally enacted

The Coinage Act 1672 (25 Cha. 2. c. 2) was an act of the Parliament of England that continued the Coin Act 1666 (18 & 19 Cha. 2. c. 5) for 7 years.

== Provisions ==
Section 1 of the act continued the Coin Act 1666 (18 & 19 Cha. 2. c. 5) until the end of the first session of the next parliament 7 years after the end of the present session of parliament.

== Subsequent developments ==
The act was continued until the end of the first session of the next parliament 7 years after 1 August 1685 by section 1 of the Coinage Act 1685 (1 Ja. 2. c. 7).

The act was continued until the end of the next session of parliament 7 years after 13 February 1692 by section 2 of the Estreats (Personal Representatives) Act 1692 (4 Will. & Mar. c. 24).

The act was continued until the end of the first session of the next parliament 7 years after 1 June 1701 by section 12 of the Taxation Act 1700 (12 & 13 Will. 3. c. 11).

The act was continued until the end of the first session of the next parliament 7 years after 1 March 1708 by section 1 of the Coinage Act 1708 (7 Ann. c. 24).

The whole act was repealed by section 1 of, and the schedule to, the Statute Law Revision Act 1966, which came into force on 10 March 1966.
