= Prohibition of 1678 =

Act of the Parliament of England

Taxation, etc. Act 1677
- Act of Parliament
- Parliament of England
- Long title: An Act for raising Money by a Poll and otherwise, to enable His Majesty to enter into an actual War against the French King, and for prohibiting several French Commodities.
- Citation: 29 & 30 Cha. 2. c. 1
- Territorial extent: England and Wales

Dates
- Royal assent: 20 March 1678
- Commencement: 28 January 1678 (Note: Start of session.)
- Repealed: 28 July 1863
Other legislation
Amended by	Importation Act 1685
Repealed by	Statute Law Revision Act 1863
Relates to	Trade with France Act 1688

Status: Repealed

Text of statute as originally enacted

Importation Act 1685
- Act of Parliament
- Parliament of England
- Long title: An Act for repealing certaine Clauses in an Act of Parlyament made in the Nine and twentyeth and Thirtyeth yeares of the Raigne of His late Majestie for Prohibiting French Commoddities.
- Citation: 1 Ja. 2. c. 6
- Territorial extent: England and Wales

Dates
- Royal assent: 27 June 1685
- Commencement: 19 May 1685 (Note: Start of session.)
- Repealed: 28 July 1863
Other legislation
Amends	Taxation, etc. Act 1677
Repealed by	Statute Law Revision Act 1863
Relates to	Trade with France Act 1688

Status: Repealed

Text of statute as originally enacted

The Prohibition of 1678 (29 & 30 Cha. 2. c. 1) was an act of the Parliament of England. Its full title was "An Act for raising Money by a Poll and otherwise, to enable His Majesty to enter into an actual War against the French King, and for prohibiting several French Commodities".

The Whig MP William Harbord in a speech claimed that "the French abstract one million yearly from us in trade" and that while this went on the French would govern English counsels. The solution was to "make a law to prohibit French trade: you need no wine and few of his commodities; and France will grow poor, and we shall grow rich". Therefore, a bill was introduced by another Whig MP William Sacheverell embodying these protectionist proposals. The beginning of the act read:

And forasmuch as it hath beene by long Experience found that the Importing of French Wines Brandy Linnen Silke Salt and Paper and other Commodities of the Growth Product or Manufacture of the Territories and Dominions of the French King, hath much exhausted the Treasure of this Nation, lessened the Value of the Native Commodities and Manufactures thereof and caused great detriment to this Kingdome in generall Bee it further enacted by the Authoritie aforesaid That from and after the Twentyeth of March One thousand six hundred seaventy seaven Noe French Wine Vinegar Brandy Linnen Cloath Silks Salt. Paper or any Manufactures made of or mixed with Silke Threade Woole Haire Gold or Silver or Leather being of the Growth Product or Manufacture of any the Dominions or Territories of the French King shall dureing the terme of three yeares to be accounted from the said Twentyeth day of March or before the end of the first Session of Parlyament next after the expiration of the said Three yeares be brought in by Land or shall be imported in any Shipp or Shipps Vessell or Vessells [whatsoever] into any Port Heaven Creeke or other place [whatsoever] of the Kingdome of England Dominion of Wales or Towne of Berwicke upon Tweede or Isles of Jersey Guernsey Alderny Sarke or Isle of Man from any [Place or Port] whatever either mixt or unmixt with any Commodity of the Growth or Product of any other Nation Place or Country whatsoever.

In his Speech from the Throne opening the parliamentary session of 1679, King Charles II lamented "the loss I sustain by the prohibition of French Wines and Brandy, which turns only to my prejudice, and to the great advantage of the French".

In the opinion of the economic historian William Ashley, the act was the "real starting-point in the history of Whig policy in the matter of trade". It was regarded by writers in the eighteenth century as a turning point in the economic history of England but by the nineteenth century had been forgotten.

The act was intended to expire in three years' time but as Parliament was not sitting it remained on the statute book. Upon the accession of James II a new Parliament was elected that was strongly Tory and therefore the act was repealed by the Importation Act 1685 (1 Ja. 2. c. 6). However the Whigs criticised its repeal, with one Whig writer lamenting that "an inundation of French commodities to the value of above four millions sterling, within the compass of less than three years, whereby all the evils formerly complained of were renewed, insomuch that the nation would have bee soon beggared, had it not been for the happy revolution in the year 1688, when all commerce with France was effectually barred" by the Trade with France Act 1688.

== Subsequent developments ==
The whole act was repealed by section 1 of, and the schedule to, the Statute Law Revision Act 1966, which came into force on 10 March 1966.
