= Importation Act 1666 =

Act of the Parliament of England

- Act of Parliament
- Parliament of England
- Long title: An Act against importing Cattell from Ireland and other parts beyond the Seas and Fish taken by Foreigners.
- Citation: 18 & 19 Cha. 2. c. 2 (Note: This is the citation in The Statutes of the Realm.); 18 Cha. 2. c. 2 (Note: This is the citation in The Statutes at Large.)
- Territorial extent: England and Wales

Dates
- Royal assent: 2 February 1668
- Commencement: 21 September 1666 (Note: Start of session.)
- Expired: 24 January 1679
- Repealed: 5 July 1825
Other legislation
| Repealed by | Customs Law Repeal Act 1825 |
| Relates to | Encouragement of Trade Act 1663; Hearth Money Act 1663 |

Status: Repealed

Text of statute as originally enacted

The Importation Act 1666 (18 & 19 Cha. 2. c. 2) was an act of the Parliament of England that banned the importation of Irish cattle into England.

== Subsequent developments ==
The whole act was repealed by the Customs Law Repeal Act 1825 (6 Geo. 4. c. 105), which came into force on 5 July 1825.
