= Coin Act 1666 =

Act of the Parliament of England

- Act of Parliament
- Parliament of England
- Long title: An Act for encourageing of Coynage.
- Citation: 18 & 19 Cha. 2. c. 5 (Note: This is the chapter in The Statutes of the Realm.); 18 Cha. 2. c. 5 (Note: This is the chapter in the Statutes at Large.)
- Territorial extent: England and Wales

Dates
- Royal assent: 18 January 1667
- Commencement: 21 September 1666 (Note: Start of session.)
- Expired: 20 December 1671 (Note: Section 11.)
- Repealed: 4 April 1870
Other legislation
Amended by	Coinage Act 1672; Coinage Act 1685; Estreats (Personal Representatives) Act 1692; Taxation Act 1700; Coinage Act 1708
Repealed by	Coinage Act 1870

Status: Repealed

Text of statute as originally enacted

The Coin Act 1666 (18 & 19 Cha. 2. c. 5) was an act of the Parliament of England.

== Subsequent developments ==
Section 11 of the act provided that the act would remain in force until 20 December 1671 and then until the end of the first session of the parliament next following.

== Subsequent developments ==
The act was continued until the end of the first session of the next parliament 7 years after the end of the present session of parliament by section 1 of the Coinage Act 1672 (25 Cha. 2. c. 2).

The act was continued until the end of the first session of the next parliament 7 years after 1 August 1685 by section 1 of the Coinage Act 1685 (1 Ja. 2. c. 7).

The act was continued until the end of the next session of parliament 7 years after 13 February 1692 by section 2 of the Estreats (Personal Representatives) Act 1692 (4 Will. & Mar. c. 24).

The act was continued until the end of the first session of the next parliament 7 years after 1 June 1701 by section 12 of the Taxation Act 1700 (12 & 13 Will. 3. c. 11).

The act was continued until the end of the first session of the next parliament 7 years after 1 March 1708 by section 1 of the Coinage Act 1708 (7 Ann. c. 24).

Sections 6–12 of the act were repealed by section 1 of, and the schedule to, the Statute Law Revision Act 1863 (26 & 27 Vict. c. 125), which came into force on 28 July 1863.

The whole act was repealed by section 20 of, and the second part of the second schedule to, the Coinage Act 1870 (33 & 34 Vict. c. 10), which came into force on 4 April 1870.
