= Licensing of the Press Act 1662 =

Act of the Parliament of England

- Act of Parliament
- Parliament of England
- Long title: An Act for preventing the frequent Abuses in printing seditious treasonable and unlicensed Books and Pamphlets and for regulating of Printing and Printing Presses
- Citation: 14 Cha. 2. c. 33 (Note: This is the citation in The Statutes of the Realm.); 13 & 14 Cha. 2. c. 33 (Note: This is the citation in The Statutes at Large.)
- Territorial extent: England and Wales

Dates
- Royal assent: 19 May 1662
- Commencement: 10 June 1662 (Note: Section 24.)
- Expired: 9 June 1664
- Repealed: 28 July 1863
Other legislation
Amended by	Licensing of the Press Act 1664; Licensing of the Press (No. 2) Act 1664; Licensing of the Press Act 1665; Administration of Intestates' Estate Act 1685; Estreats (Personal Representatives) Act 1692
Repealed by	Statute Law Revision Act 1863
Relates to	Statute of Anne; Newspapers Act 1855; Customs and Inland Revenue Act 1861

Status: Repealed

Text of statute as originally enacted

The Licensing of the Press Act 1662 (14 Cha. 2. c. 33), was an act of the Parliament of England with the long title An Act for preventing the frequent Abuses in printing seditious treasonable and unlicensed Books and Pamphlets and for regulating of Printing and Printing Presses. Having expired in 1695, it was officially repealed by the Statute Law Revision Act 1863 (26 & 27 Vict. c. 125), which repealed a large set of superseded acts.

The act was originally limited to two years but was extended until 1694. The provisions as to importation of books, the appointment of licensers, and the number of printers and founders were practically re-enactments of the similar provisions in an order of the Star Chamber of 1637 and also various ordinances and acts passed during the Interregnum.

== Background ==
Printing presses were not to be set up without notice to the Stationers' Company. A king's messenger had power by warrant of the king or a secretary of state to enter and search for unlicensed presses and printing. Severe penalties by fine and imprisonment were denounced against offenders.

Under the powers of the act Sir Roger L'Estrange was appointed licenser, and the effect of the supervision was that practically the newspaper press was reduced to the London Gazette. The act expired in 1679, and for the remainder of the reign of Charles II, as in the reign of George III, the restrictions on the press took the form of prosecutions for libel.

== Subsequent developments ==
Licensing of the Press Act 1664
- Act of Parliament
- Parliament of England
- Long title: An Act for continuance of a former Act for regulateing the Presse.
- Citation: 16 Cha. 2. c. 8
- Territorial extent: England and Wales

Dates
- Royal assent: 17 May 1664
- Commencement: 16 March 1664 (Note: Start of session)
- Expired: 2 March 1665 (Note: Section 1.)
- Repealed: 28 July 1863
Other legislation
Amends	Licensing of the Press Act 1662
Repealed by	Statute Law Revision Act 1863
Relates to	Licensing of the Press (No. 2) Act 1664; Licensing of the Press Act 1665

Status: Repealed

Text of statute as originally enacted

The act was continued until the end of the next session of parliament (2 March 1665) by section 1 of the Licensing of the Press Act 1664 (16 Cha. 2. c. 8).

Licensing of the Press (No. 2) Act 1664
- Act of Parliament
- Parliament of England
- Long title: An Act for continuance of a former Act for regulateing the Presse.
- Citation: 16 & 17 Cha. 2. c. 7
- Territorial extent: England and Wales

Dates
- Royal assent: 2 March 1665
- Commencement: 24 November 1664
- Expired: 31 October 1665
- Repealed: 28 July 1863
Other legislation
Amends	Licensing of the Press Act 1662
Repealed by	Statute Law Revision Act 1863
Relates to	Licensing of the Press Act 1664; Licensing of the Press Act 1665

Status: Repealed

Text of statute as originally enacted

The act was continued until the end of the next session of parliament (31 October 1665) by section 1 of the Licensing of the Press (No. 2) Act 1664 (16 & 17 Cha. 2. c. 7).

Licensing of the Press Act 1665
- Act of Parliament
- Parliament of England
- Long title: An Act for continuance of a former Act for regulateing the Presse.
- Citation: 17 Cha. 2. c. 4
- Territorial extent: England and Wales

Dates
- Royal assent: 31 October 1665
- Commencement: 9 October 1665
- Expired: 12 July 1679
- Repealed: Statute Law Revision Act 1863
Other legislation
Amends	Licensing of the Press Act 1662
Repealed by	Statute Law Revision Act 1863
Relates to	Licensing of the Press Act 1664; Licensing of the Press (No. 2) Act 1664

Status: Repealed

Text of statute as originally enacted

The act was continued until the end of the first session of the next parliament (12 July 1679) by section 1 of the Licensing of the Press Act 1665 (17 Cha. 2. c. 4).

The act was revived and continued until the end of the next session of parliament after 7 years from 24 June 1685 (14 March 1693) by section 15 of the Administration of Intestates' Estate Act 1685 (1 Ja. 2. c. 17). No mention of the liberty of the press was made in the Bill of Rights of 1689.

The act was continued until the end of the next session of parliament after 1 year from 13 February 1692 (25 April 1694) by section 15 of the Estreats (Personal Representatives) Act 1692 (4 Will. & Mar. c. 24).

Following the expiry of the act in 1694, a committee was appointed in November 1694 to inspect laws "lately expired and expiring which are fit to be revived and continued". The committee resolved in January 1695 to renew the act, which was rejected by the Commons on 11 February, without division. The Continuation Bill was amended by the Lords to re-include the act, which was subsequently rejected by the Commons on 17 April 1695. On 18 April 1695, the Lords allowed the bill to proceed without renewing the act. The Continuance of Laws Act 1694 (6 & 7 Will. & Mar. c. 14) was subsequently granted royal assent on 22 April 1695.

The stationers petitioned Parliament for new censorship legislation, and when that failed they argued that authors had a natural and inherent right of ownership in what they wrote (knowing there was little an author could do with such rights other than sign them over to a publisher). This argument persuaded the Parliament and in 1710 the first Copyright Act (8 Ann. c. 21) was enacted.

The power of a secretary of state to issue a warrant, whether general or special, for the purpose of searching for and seizing the author of a libel or the libellous papers themselves – a power exercised by the Star Chamber and confirmed by the act – was still asserted, and was not finally declared illegal until the case of Entick v. Carrington in 1765 (St. Tr. xix. 1030). In 1776 the House of Commons came to a resolution in accordance with this decision. The compulsory stamp duty on newspapers was abandoned in 1855 by the Newspapers Act 1855 (18 & 19 Vict. c. 27), the duty on paper in 1861 by the Customs and Inland Revenue Act 1861 (24 & 25 Vict. c. 20), the optional duty on newspapers in 1870 by the Sligo and Cashel Disfranchisement Act 1870 (33 & 34 Vict. c. 38). From that time the English press may be said to date its complete freedom, which rests rather upon an oral constitutional rather than a statutory foundation. No legislative provision confirms the freedom of the press, as is the case in many countries.

The whole act was repealed by section 1 of, and the schedule to, the Statute Law Revision Act 1863 (26 & 27 Vict. c. 125), which came into force on 28 July 1863.

== See also ==
- Freedom of the press
- Lapse of the Licensing Act 1695
- Licensing Order of 1643
- Statute of Anne
- United Kingdom constitutional law

== Bibliography ==
- This article incorporates text from a publication now in the public domain: Chisholm, Hugh, ed. (1911). "Press Laws". Encyclopædia Britannica. Vol. 22 (11th ed.). Cambridge University Press. pp. 299–304.
