= List of acts of the Parliament of England from 1664 =

This is a list of acts of the Parliament of England for the year 1664.

For acts passed during the period 1707–1800, see the list of acts of the Parliament of Great Britain. See also the list of acts of the Parliament of Scotland, and the list of acts of the Parliament of Ireland.

For acts passed from 1801 onwards, see the list of acts of the Parliament of the United Kingdom. For acts of the devolved parliaments and assemblies in the United Kingdom, see the list of acts of the Scottish Parliament, the list of acts of the Northern Ireland Assembly, and the list of acts and measures of Senedd Cymru; see also the list of acts of the Parliament of Northern Ireland.

For medieval statutes, etc. that are not considered to be acts of Parliament, see the list of English statutes.

See also the List of ordinances and acts of the Parliament of England, 1642–1660 for ordinances and acts passed by the Long Parliament and other bodies without royal assent, and which were not considered to be valid legislation following the Restoration in 1660.

The number shown after each act's title is its chapter number. Acts are cited using this number, preceded by the years of the reign during which the relevant parliamentary session was held; thus the Union with Ireland Act 1800 is cited as "39 & 40 Geo. 3. c. 67", meaning the 67th act passed during the session that started in the 39th year of the reign of George III and which finished in the 40th year of that reign. The modern convention is to use Arabic numerals in citations (thus "41 Geo. 3" rather than "41 Geo. III"). Acts of the last session of the Parliament of Great Britain and the first session of the Parliament of the United Kingdom are both cited as "41 Geo. 3".

Acts passed by the Parliament of England did not have a short title; however, some of these acts have subsequently been given a short title by acts of the Parliament of the United Kingdom, such as the Short Titles Act 1896 (59 & 60 Vict. c. 14).

Acts passed by the Parliament of England were deemed to have come into effect on the first day of the session in which they were passed. Because of this, the years given in the list below may in fact be the year before a particular act was passed.

== 16 Cha. 2 ==
The third session of the 2nd Parliament of King Charles II (the 'Cavalier Parliament') which met from 16 March 1664 until 17 May 1664.

This session was traditionally cited as 16 Car. 2. 16 Chas. 2 or 16 C. 2; it is listed in the "Chronological Table of the Statutes" as 16 Cha. 2.

=== Public acts ===
Short title	Citation	Royal assent
Long title
Triennial Parliaments Act 1664 (repealed)	16 Cha. 2. c. 1	5 April 1664
An Act for the assembling and holding of Parliaments once in Three yeares at the least, And for the repeale of an Act entituled An Act for the preventing of Inconveniencies happening by the long Intermission of Parliaments. (Repealed by Statute Law Revision Act 1887 (50 & 51 Vict. c. 59))
Error Act 1664 (repealed)	16 Cha. 2. c. 2	5 April 1664
An Act for preventing of Abatements of Writts of Error upon Judgements in the Exchequer. (Repealed by Statute Law Revision Act 1863 (26 & 27 Vict. c. 125))
Hearth Money Act 1664 (repealed)	16 Cha. 2. c. 3	17 May 1664
An Act for collecting the Duty ariseing by Hearth-money by Officers to be appointed by His Majestie. (Repealed by Hearth Money Act 1688 (1 Will. & Mar. c. 10))
Conventicle Act 1664 (repealed)	16 Cha. 2. c. 4	17 May 1664
An Act to prevent and suppresse seditious Conventicles. (Repealed by Statute Law Revision Act 1863 (26 & 27 Vict. c. 125))
Navy Act 1664 (repealed)	16 Cha. 2. c. 5	17 May 1664
An Act to prevent the Disturbances of Seamen and others and to preserve the Stores belonging to His Majestyes Navy Royall. (Repealed by Statute Law Revision Act 1863 (26 & 27 Vict. c. 125))
Merchant Ships Act 1664 (repealed)	16 Cha. 2. c. 6	17 May 1664
An Act to prevent the delivering up of Merchants Shipps. (Repealed by Statute Law Revision Act 1863 (26 & 27 Vict. c. 125))
Gaming Act 1664 (repealed)	16 Cha. 2. c. 7	17 May 1664
An Act against deceitfull disorderly and excessive Gameing. (Repealed by Gaming Act 1845 (8 & 9 Vict. c. 109))
Licensing of the Press Act 1664 (repealed)	16 Cha. 2. c. 8	17 May 1664
An Act for continuance of a former Act (Note: Licensing of the Press Act 1662 (14 Cha. 2. c. 33)) for regulateing the Presse. (Repealed by Statute Law Revision Act 1863 (26 & 27 Vict. c. 125))

=== Private acts ===
Short title	Citation	Royal assent
Long title
Vacating of certain conveyances made by Sir John Packington to Christopher Henn and others.	16 Cha. 2. c. 1 Pr.	17 May 1664
An Act for vacating certain Conveyances, made by Sir John Pakington Baronet, to Christopher Henne and others.
Armin's Estate Act 1664	16 Cha. 2. c. 2 Pr.	17 May 1664
An Act for the Sale of the Manor of Ingoldsby, and divers Lands in Ingoldsby, in the County of Lyncolne, for raising Portions for the Two Daughters and Coheirs of Sir William Armin the Younger, Baronet, deceased.
Glemham's Estate Act 1664	16 Cha. 2. c. 3 Pr.	17 May 1664
An Act for the Sale of certain Lands, for Payment of the Debts of Sir Sackvile Glemham.
Keite's Estate Act 1664	16 Cha. 2. c. 4 Pr.	17 May 1664
An Act to enable Trustees for Sir William Keyte to sell Lands, for the Payment of Debts.
Malvern Chase Inclosure and Improvement Act 1664	16 Cha. 2. c. 5 Pr.	17 May 1664
An Act for Confirmation of the Enclosure and Improvement of Malverne Chace.
Settling Abraham Colfe's charitable gift for erecting and endowing two free schools and an almshouse at Lewisham (Kent).	16 Cha. 2. c. 6 Pr.	17 May 1664
An Act for settling the Charitable Gift of Abraham Colfe Clerk, for erecting and endowing Two Freeschools, and an Alms-house, at Lewisham, in Kent.
Naturalization of Dame Katherine Sayer and others.	16 Cha. 2. c. 7 Pr.	17 May 1664
An Act for naturalizing of Dame Katherine Sayer and others.
Enabling Francis or Charles Cottington to settle and dispose of lands to provide jointures for future wives.	16 Cha. 2. c. 8 Pr.	17 May 1664
An Act to enable Francis Cottington, or Charles Cottington, to settle and dispose of Lands in Jointure, for any Wife or Wives they shall take in Marriage.
Cotton's Estate Act 1664	16 Cha. 2. c. 9 Pr.	17 May 1664
An Act to enable Charles Cotton Esquire to make Leases of Lands, for Payment of Debts.
Falmouth Church Act 1664	16 Cha. 2. c. 10 Pr.	17 May 1664
An Act for the making of the Church erected at Falmouth a Parish Church, and no Part of the Parish of Gluvias, or Chapelry of St. Budock.

=== Sources ===
- Raithby, John, ed. (1963) [1819]. "16° Car. II.". Statutes of the Realm. Vol. 5: The Statutes of King Charles I and King Charles II (1625–1680). London: Dawsons. pp. 513–524 – via HathiTrust.
- Raithby, John, ed. (1819). Statutes of the Realm. Vol. 5: 1628-80 – via British History Online.
- Pickering, Danby, ed. (1763). "Anno decimo sexto Caroli II". The Statutes at Large. Vol. 8: From the Twelfth Year of King Charles II to the Last Year of King James II. Inclusive. Cambridge: Joseph Bentham. pp. 206–210 – via Internet Archive.
- Chronological Table of and Index to the Statutes. Vol. 1: To the End of the Session 59 Vict. Sess. 2 (1895) (13th ed.). London: Her Majesty's Stationery Office. 1896. pp. 70–71 – via Google Books.
- Chronological Table of the Statutes: Covering the Period from 1235 to the End of 1971. London: Her Majesty's Stationery Office. 1972. p. 68. ISBN 978-0-11-840096-1 – via Google Books.
- "Chronological Tables of the Private and Personal Acts: Part 3 (1660–1680)". legislation.gov.uk. The National Archives.

== 16 & 17 Cha. 2 ==
The fourth session of the 2nd Parliament of King Charles II (the 'Cavalier Parliament') which met from 24 November 1664 until 2 March 1665.

This session was traditionally cited as 16 & 17 Car. 2, 16 & 17 Chas. 2 or 16 & 17 C. 2; it is listed in the "Chronological Table of the Statutes" as 16 & 17 Cha. 2.

=== Public acts ===
Short title	Citation	Royal assent
Long title
Taxation Act 1664 (repealed)	16 & 17 Cha. 2. c. 1	9 February 1665
An Act for granting a Royall Ayd unto the Kings Majestie of Twenty fower hundred threescore and seaventeene thousand and five hundred Pounds to be raised leavyed and paid in the space of Three Yeares. (Repealed by Statute Law Revision Act 1863 (26 & 27 Vict. c. 125))
Coal Trade, London Act 1664 (repealed)	16 & 17 Cha. 2. c. 2	2 March 1665
An Act for regulateing the Measures and Prices of Coales. (Repealed by London, Westminster, Middlesex, Surrey, Kent and Essex Coal Trade Act 1807 (47 Geo. 3 Sess. 2. c. lxviii))
Juries Act 1664 (repealed)	16 & 17 Cha. 2. c. 3	2 March 1665
An Act for the returning of able and sufficient Jurors. (Repealed by Statute Law Revision Act 1863 (26 & 27 Vict. c. 125))
Excise Act 1664 (repealed)	16 & 17 Cha. 2. c. 4	2 March 1665
An Additional Act for the better ordering and collecting the Duty of Excise. (Repealed by Statute Law Revision Act 1863 (26 & 27 Vict. c. 125))
Execution Act 1664 (repealed)	16 & 17 Cha. 2. c. 5	2 March 1665
An Act to prevent Delayes in Extending Statutes Judgements and Recognizances. (Repealed by Administration of Justice Act 1965 (c. 2))
Prize Goods Act 1664 (repealed)	16 & 17 Cha. 2. c. 6	2 March 1665
An Act for repealing of part of an Act of Parlyament intituled "An Act directing the prosecution of such as are accomptable for Prize Goods." (Note: Prize Goods Act 1662 (14 Cha. 2. c. 14)) (Repealed by Statute Law Revision Act 1863 (26 & 27 Vict. c. 125))
Licensing of the Press (No. 2) Act 1664 (repealed)	16 & 17 Cha. 2. c. 7	2 March 1665
An Act for continuance of a former Act (Note: Licensing of the Press Act 1662 (14 Cha. 2. c. 33)) for regulateing the Presse. (Repealed by Statute Law Revision Act 1863 (26 & 27 Vict. c. 125))
Arrest of Judgment Act 1664 (repealed)	16 & 17 Cha. 2. c. 8	2 March 1665
An Act to prevent Arrests of Judgement and superseding Executions. (Repealed by Civil Procedure Acts Repeal Act 1879 (42 & 43 Vict. c. 59))
Lancaster (Affidavits) Act 1664 (repealed)	16 & 17 Cha. 2. c. 9	2 March 1665
An Act to impower the Chauncellour of the Dutchy to grant Commissions for takeing Affidavits within the Dutchy Liberty. (Repealed by Commissioners for Oaths Act 1889 (52 & 53 Vict. c. 10))
Highways (Hertford) Act 1664 (repealed)	16 & 17 Cha. 2. c. 10 (Note: Also listed as 16 & 17 Cha. 2. c. 19 Pr.)	2 March 1665
An Act for continuance of a former Act for repairing the Highwayes within the County of Hertford. (Repealed by Hertfordshire Roads Act 1732 (6 Geo. 2. c. 24))
Draining Deeping Fen Act 1664 (repealed)	16 & 17 Cha. 2. c. 11 (Note: Also listed as 16 & 17 Cha. 2. c. 20 Pr.)	2 March 1665
An Act for drayning of the Fenn called Deeping Fenn and other Fenns therin mentioned. (Repealed by Deeping Fen Drainage Act 1856 (19 & 20 Vict. c. lxv))
River Avon Navigation (Christchurch to New Sarum) Act 1664	16 & 17 Cha. 2. c. 12 (Note: Also listed as 16 & 17 Cha. 2. c. 11 Pr.)	2 March 1665
An Act for making the River Avon navigable from Christ Church to the City of New Sarum.

=== Private acts ===
Short title	Citation	Royal assent
Long title
Sir Edward Hungerford: power to sell lands in Devon.	16 & 17 Cha. 2. c. 1 Pr.	9 February 1665
An Act to enable Sir Edward Hungerford, Knight of the Bath, to sell certain Lands, in the County of Devon.
Sandys' Estate Act 1664	16 & 17 Cha. 2. c. 2 Pr.	9 February 1665
An Act for the enabling of Trustees to sell Part of the Estate of Samuell Sandys the Elder Esquire, and of his Son Samuell Sandys, for the Payment of Debts.
Confirmation of a deed of settlement between the Earl of Thanet and his younger brothers.	16 & 17 Cha. 2. c. 3 Pr.	2 March 1665
An Act for confirming a Deed of Settlement between the Earl of Thannett and his Younger Brothers.
Enabling the Bishop of Winchester to convey 100 acres of land in the disparked Park of Bishops Waltham (Hampshire) to the rector of Bishops Waltham parish church and his successors in lieu of all tithes and tithe payments due to them for Waltham Parks.	16 & 17 Cha. 2. c. 4 Pr.	2 March 1665
An Act to enable the Bishop of Winton to convey One Hundred Acres of Land, lying in the Great Disparked Park of Bishops Waltham, in the Parish of Bishops Waltham, in the County of South'ton, upon the Rector of the said Parish Church of Bishops Waltham and his Successors, in Lieu of all Tithes, and Payments for Tithes, due to the said Rector and his Successors for Waltham Parks.
Lord Henry Powlet, George Withers and John Mompesson: power to sell manor of Abbots-Anne (Hampshire).	16 & 17 Cha. 2. c. 5 Pr.	2 March 1665
An Act to enable the Lord Henry Powlett, George Withers, and John Mompesson, to sell the Manor of Abbotts Anne, in the County of Southampton.
Enabling Henry Lord Loughborough to make the river and sewer navigable from or near Bristow Causey (Lambeth) into the River Thames.	16 & 17 Cha. 2. c. 6 Pr.	2 March 1665
An Act to enable Henry Lord Loughborough to make the River and Sewer navigable, from or near Bristowe Causey, in the County of Surrey, into the River of Thames.
Lord Strangford's Estate Act 1664	16 & 17 Cha. 2. c. 7 Pr.	2 March 1665
An Act to enable Trustees for the Lord Strangford to sell Lands, for Payment of Debts.
Stanley's Restitution Act 1664	16 & 17 Cha. 2. c. 8 Pr.	2 March 1665
An Act for restoring Sir Charles Stanley in Blood.
Astley's Estate Act 1664	16 & 17 Cha. 2. c. 9 Pr.	2 March 1665
An Act for the settling of several Manors, Lands, and Tenements of Sir Jacob Astley, lying in the Counties of Norfolke and Warwicke.
Carr's Estate Act 1664	16 & 17 Cha. 2. c. 10 Pr.	2 March 1665
An Act for settling the Estate of Sir Robert Carr Baronet.
River Avon Navigation (Christchurch to New Sarum) Act 1664	16 & 17 Cha. 2. c. 11 Pr. (Note: Also listed as 16 & 17 Cha. 2. c. 12.)	2 March 1665
An Act for making the River Avon navigable from Christ Church to the City of New Sarum.
River Medway (Kent and Sussex) Navigation Act 1664	16 & 17 Cha. 2. c. 12 Pr.	2 March 1665
An Act for making the River of Medway navigable, in the Counties of Kent and Sussex.
River Navigation Act 1664	16 & 17 Cha. 2. c. 13 Pr.	2 March 1665
An Act for making divers Rivers navigable, or otherwise passable, for Boats, Barges, and other Vessels.
For settling differences between Great and Little Yarmouth concerning the loading and unloading of herrings and other goods.	16 & 17 Cha. 2. c. 14 Pr.	2 March 1665
An Act for settling of Differences between the Towns of Great and Little Yarmouth, touching the Lading and Unlading of Herrings, and other Merchandizes and Commodities.
Naturalization of Richard Comes and others.	16 & 17 Cha. 2. c. 15 Pr.	2 March 1665
An Act for the naturalizing Dederic alias Richard Comes, and others.
Micklethwaite's Estate Act 1664	16 & 17 Cha. 2. c. 16 Pr.	2 March 1665
An Act for confirming of an Act, intituled, "An Act to enable Joseph Micklethwaite, an Infant, and his Trustees, to sell Land, for Payment of his Father's Debts." (Note: Joseph Micklethwaite's Estate Act 1660 (12 Cha. 2. c. 30 Pr.))
Iuckes of Trelidden's (Estate Act 1664	16 & 17 Cha. 2. c. 17 Pr.	2 March 1665
An Act for the enabling of Thomas Juckes, of Treliddan, in the County of Mountgomery, Esquire, to sell Lands, for the Payment of his Debts, and raising of Younger Childrens Portions.
Lee's Estate Act 1664	16 & 17 Cha. 2. c. 18 Pr.	2 March 1665
An Act to enable Francis Leigh Esquire to sell Lands, for Payment of Debts, and to make Provision for his Children."
Highways (Hertford) Act 1664 (repealed)	16 & 17 Cha. 2. c. 19 Pr. (Note: Also listed as 16 & 17 Cha. 2. c. 10.)	2 March 1665
An Act for continuance of a former Act for repairing the Highwayes within the County of Hertford. (Repealed by Hertfordshire Roads Act 1732 (6 Geo. 2. c. 24))
Draining Deeping Fen Act 1664	16 & 17 Cha. 2. c. 20 Pr. (Note: Also listed as 16 & 17 Cha. 2. c. 11.)	2 March 1665
An Act for drayning of the Fenn called Deeping Fenn and other Fenns therin mentioned.

=== Sources ===
- Raithby, John, ed. (1963) [1819]. "16 & 17° Car. II.". Statutes of the Realm. Vol. 5: The Statutes of King Charles I and King Charles II (1625–1680). London: Dawsons. pp. 525–569 – via HathiTrust.
- Raithby, John, ed. (1819). Statutes of the Realm. Vol. 5: 1628-80 – via British History Online.
- Pickering, Danby, ed. (1763). "Anno decimo sexto & septimo Caroli II". The Statutes at Large. Vol. 8: From the Twelfth Year of King Charles II to the Last Year of King James II. Inclusive. Cambridge: Joseph Bentham. pp. 210–217 – via Internet Archive.
- Chronological Table of and Index to the Statutes. Vol. 1: To the End of the Session 59 Vict. Sess. 2 (1895) (13th ed.). London: Her Majesty's Stationery Office. 1896. p. 71 – via Google Books.
- Chronological Table of the Statutes: Covering the Period from 1235 to the End of 1971. London: Her Majesty's Stationery Office. 1972. p. 68. ISBN 978-0-11-840096-1 – via Google Books.
- "Chronological Tables of the Private and Personal Acts: Part 3 (1660–1680)". legislation.gov.uk. The National Archives.

== See also ==
- List of acts of the Parliament of England
