= Edmund Waller (Amersham MP) =

17th-century English politician

Personal details
- Born: 6 January 1652 Beaconsfield, Buckinghamshire, England
- Died: January 1700 (48 years old)
- Spouse: Abigail Tilney (m. 1686; death 1689)
- Parent: Edmund Waller
- Education: Christ Church, Oxford

Edmund Waller II (1652–1700), of Hall Barn, Beaconsfield, Buckinghamshire was an English landowner and politician who sat in the House of Commons in the late 17th century.

Edmund Waller II was born 6 January 1652, the third son of English poet and politician Edmund Waller, and the second son of Waller's second wife. In 1666, he began his education at Christ Church, Oxford, then began training in law in 1668 and was call to the bar in 1675.

Waller married Abigail Tilney on 10 July 1686, though she died three years later. The couple had no children.

In 1687, Waller's father died, after which Waller inherited the Hall Barn estate as his sole surviving elder brother was not considered to be of sound mind.

From 1688 to 1698, Waller served as a Justice of the Peace for Buckinghamshire. He represented Wycombe as a Member of Parliament during the reigns of Charles II and William III.

Waller died in January 1700.
