= Trade with France Act 1688 =

Act of the Parliament of England

- Act of Parliament
- Parliament of England
- Long title: An act for prohibiting all trade and commerce with France.
- Citation: 1 Will. & Mar. c. 34 (Note: This is the citation in The Statutes of the Realm.); 1 Will. & Mar. Sess. 1. c. 34 (Note: This is the citation in The Statutes at Large.)
- Territorial extent: England and Wales

Dates
- Royal assent: 20 August 1689
- Commencement: 24 August 1689 (Note: Section 1.)
- Expired: 23 August 1692
- Repealed: 15 July 1867
Other legislation
Amended by	Trade with France Act 1690; Trade with France Act 1692
Repealed by	Statute Law Revision Act 1867

Status: Repealed

Text of statute as originally enacted

Trade with France Act 1690
- Act of Parliament
- Parliament of England
- Long title: An Act for the more effectuall puting in Execution an Act Entituled "An Act for Prohibiting all Trade and Commerce with France".
- Citation: 2 Will. & Mar. Sess. 2. c. 14
- Territorial extent: England and Wales

Dates
- Royal assent: 5 January 1691
- Commencement: 2 October 1690 (Note: Start of session.)
- Repealed: 15 July 1867
Other legislation
Amends	Trade with France Act 1688
Amended by	Trade with France Act 1692
Repealed by	Statute Law Revision Act 1867

Status: Repealed

Text of statute as originally enacted

Trade with France Act 1692
- Act of Parliament
- Parliament of England
- Long title: An Act for continuing the Acts For prohibiting all Trade and Commerce with France and for the encouragement of Privateers.
- Citation: 4 Will. & Mar. c. 25
- Territorial extent: England and Wales

Dates
- Royal assent: 14 March 1693
- Commencement: 4 November 1692
- Expired: 27 April 1696
- Repealed: 15 July 1867
Other legislation
Amends	Trade with France Act 1688; Trade with France Act 1690
Repealed by	Statute Law Revision Act 1867

Status: Repealed

Text of statute as originally enacted

The Trade with France Act 1688 (1 Will. & Mar. c. 34) was an act of the Parliament of England which prohibited all trade and commerce with France, effective 24 August 1689 and in force for three years. Passage had followed the accession of William III and Mary II, and after their declaration of war against France on 17 May 1689 (O.S.). The act expired in 1692 with the Nine Years' War still raging, and it was renewed by the Trade with France Act 1692 (4 Will. & Mar. c. 25), also known as the Prize Act 1692, for a further three years.

== Subsequent developments ==
The whole act was repealed by section 1 of, and the schedule to, the Statute Law Revision Act 1867 (30 & 31 Vict. c. 59), which came into force on 15 July 1867.
