= List of acts of the Parliament of England from 1672 =

This is a list of acts of the Parliament of England for the year 1672.

For acts passed during the period 1707–1800, see the list of acts of the Parliament of Great Britain. See also the list of acts of the Parliament of Scotland, and the list of acts of the Parliament of Ireland.

For acts passed from 1801 onwards, see the list of acts of the Parliament of the United Kingdom. For acts of the devolved parliaments and assemblies in the United Kingdom, see the list of acts of the Scottish Parliament, the list of acts of the Northern Ireland Assembly, and the list of acts and measures of Senedd Cymru; see also the list of acts of the Parliament of Northern Ireland.

For medieval statutes, etc. that are not considered to be acts of Parliament, see the list of English statutes.

See also the List of ordinances and acts of the Parliament of England, 1642–1660 for ordinances and acts passed by the Long Parliament and other bodies without royal assent, and which were not considered to be valid legislation following the Restoration in 1660.

The number shown after each act's title is its chapter number. Acts are cited using this number, preceded by the years of the reign during which the relevant parliamentary session was held; thus the Union with Ireland Act 1800 is cited as "39 & 40 Geo. 3. c. 67", meaning the 67th act passed during the session that started in the 39th year of the reign of George III and which finished in the 40th year of that reign. The modern convention is to use Arabic numerals in citations (thus "41 Geo. 3" rather than "41 Geo. III"). Acts of the last session of the Parliament of Great Britain and the first session of the Parliament of the United Kingdom are both cited as "41 Geo. 3".

Acts passed by the Parliament of England did not have a short title; however, some of these acts have subsequently been given a short title by acts of the Parliament of the United Kingdom, such as the Short Titles Act 1896 (59 & 60 Vict. c. 14).

Acts passed by the Parliament of England were deemed to have come into effect on the first day of the session in which they were passed. Because of this, the years given in the list below may in fact be the year before a particular act was passed.

== 25 Cha. 2 ==
The tenth session of the 2nd Parliament of King Charles II (the 'Cavalier Parliament'), which met from 4 February 1673 until 29 March 1673.

(Acts dated "1672" because session started before 25 March 1673, the end of the civil and legal year 1672.)

This session was traditionally cited as 25 Car. 2, 25 Chas. 2 or 25 C. 2; it is listed in the "Chronological Table of the Statutes" as 25 Car. 2.

=== Public acts ===
Short title	Citation	Royal assent
Long title
Taxation Act 1672 (repealed)	25 Cha. 2. c. 1	29 March 1673
An Act for raising the Summe of Twelve hundred thirty eight thousand seaven hundred, and fifty Pounds for supply of his Majesties extraordinary occasions. (Repealed by Statute Law Revision Act 1863 (26 & 27 Vict. c. 125))
Popish Recusants Act 1672 or the Test Act 1673 (repealed)	25 Cha. 2. c. 2	29 March 1673
An Act for preventing Dangers which may happen from Popish Recusants. (Repealed by Statute Law Revision Act 1863 (26 & 27 Vict. c. 125))
Duchy of Cornwall Act 1672 (repealed)	25 Cha. 2. c. 3	29 March 1673
An Act for enableing his Majestie to make Leases of his Lands belonging to the Dutchy of Cornwall. (Repealed by Statute Law Revision Act 1948 (11 & 12 Geo. 6. c. 62))
Sale of Cattle Act 1672 (repealed)	25 Cha. 2. c. 4	29 March 1673
An Act for repeale of a Clause in a former Act (Note: Sale of Cattle Act 1670 (22 & 23 Cha. 2. c. 19)) to prohibit Salesmen from selling Fatt Cattell. (Repealed by Statute Law Revision Act 1863 (26 & 27 Vict. c. 125))
General Pardon Act 1672 (repealed)	25 Cha. 2. c. 5	29 March 1673
An Act for the Kings Majestyes most Gratious, Generall and Free Pardon. (Repealed by Statute Law Revision Act 1863 (26 & 27 Vict. c. 125))
Aliens Duty Act 1672 (repealed)	25 Cha. 2. c. 6	29 March 1673
An Act for takeing off Aliens Duty upon Commodities of the Growth, Product and Manufacture of the Nation. (Repealed by Statute Law Revision Act 1863 (26 & 27 Vict. c. 125))
Trade Act 1672 or the Navigation Act 1673 (repealed)	25 Cha. 2. c. 7	29 March 1673
An Act for the incouragement of the Greeneland and Eastland Trades, and for the better secureing the Plantation Trade. (Repealed by Statute Law Revision Act 1863 (26 & 27 Vict. c. 125))
Coinage Act 1672 (repealed)	25 Cha. 2. c. 8	29 March 1673
An Act for continuing a former Act (Note: Coin Act 1666 (18 & 19 Cha. 2. c. 5)) concerning Coynage. (Repealed by Statute Law Revision Act 1863 (26 & 27 Vict. c. 125))
Durham (Representation of) Act 1672 (repealed)	25 Cha. 2. c. 9	29 March 1673
An Act to enable the County Palatine of Durham to send Knights and Burgesses to serve in Parlyament. (Repealed by Statute Law Revision Act 1887 (50 & 51 Vict. c. 59))
Fire of London, Property Disputes Act 1672 (repealed)	25 Cha. 2. c. 10	29 March 1673
An Act for reviveing the Judicature for determination of Differences touching Houses burnt downe and demolished by reason of the late Fire, which happened in London, and for rebuilding of the Navy Office. (Repealed by Statute Law Revision Act 1948 (11 & 12 Geo. 6. c. 62))

=== Private acts ===
Short title	Citation	Royal assent
Long title
Settlement of Chudleigh Rectory (Devon) on Thomas Lord Clifford and others.	25 Cha. 2. c. 1 Pr.	29 March 1673
An Act for the Settlement of the Rectory of Chudleigh, in the County of Devon, upon Thomas Lord Clifford and others.
Earl of Salisbury's Estate Act 1672	25 Cha. 2. c. 2 Pr.	29 March 1673
An Act to enable James Earl of Salisbury to let Leases of certain Lands and Tenements, for any Term not exceeding Forty Years.
Enabling the dean and chapter of Bristol cathedral to exchange Berkeley vicarage (Gloucestershire) with George Lord Berkeley for his rectory of St Michael in Sutton Bonnington (Nottinghamshire).	25 Cha. 2. c. 3 Pr.	29 March 1673
An Act to enable the Dean and Chapter of the Cathedral Church of Bristoll to exchange their Vicarage of Berkeley, in the County of Gloucester, with George Lord Berkeley, for the Rectory of St. Michaell, in Sutton Bonnington, in the County of Nottingham.
Hanham's Estate Act 1672	25 Cha. 2. c. 4 Pr.	29 March 1673
An Act to enable the Trustees of Sir William Hanham Baronet, deceased, to sell Lands, to pay his Debts, according to his own Direction in his Lifetime; and for Management of the Estate of Sir John Hanham, an Infant, during his Minority.
Rich's Estate Act 1672	25 Cha. 2. c. 5 Pr.	29 March 1673
An Act to confirm Articles of Agreement made upon the Marriage of Sir William Rich Baronet.
Woolrich's Estate Act 1672	25 Cha. 2. c. 6 Pr.	29 March 1673
An Act for confirming of an Award made by Sir Orlando Bridgman Knight and Baronet, late Lord Keeper of the Great Seal of England, for the ending of all Differences in the Family of Sir Thomas Wolrych Knight and Baronet, deceased; and to enable John Wolrych Esquire and his Heirs to execute the Powers in the said Award mentioned.
Berkeley's Estate Act 1672	25 Cha. 2. c. 7 Pr.	29 March 1673
An Act for transferring the Interest of a Term of Years in certain Manors and Lands late of Sir Robert Berkeley Knight, deceased, and Payment of Portions appointed to his Grandchildren.
Confirming agreements between Sir Ralph Bancks, Sir J. Hanham and others.	25 Cha. 2. c. 8 Pr.	29 March 1673
An Act for confirming Agreements made between Sir Ralph Bankes, Sir John Hanham Baronet, Ellis Bethell, Thomas Mackrell, Richard Worland, and John Edwards, by their Guardians and divers other Persons.
Explaining and declaring the extent of an exception in a deed.	25 Cha. 2. c. 9 Pr.	29 March 1673
An Act for explaining and declaring the Extent of an Exception in a Deed therein named.
Bellamy's Estate Act 1672	25 Cha. 2. c. 10 Pr.	29 March 1673
An Act for enabling Robert Bellamy to sell Lands, for Payment of his Debts.
Lloyd's Naturalization Act 1672	25 Cha. 2. c. 11 Pr.	29 March 1673
An Act for the naturalizing of Phillip Lloyd Gentleman.

=== Sources ===
- Raithby, John, ed. (1963) [1819]. "25° Car. II.". Statutes of the Realm. Vol. 5: The Statutes of King Charles I and King Charles II (1625–1680). London: Dawsons. pp. 752–797 – via HathiTrust.
- Raithby, John, ed. (1819). Statutes of the Realm. Vol. 5: 1628-80 – via British History Online.
- Pickering, Danby, ed. (1763). "Anno vicesimo quinto Caroli II". The Statutes at Large. Vol. 8: From the Twelfth Year of King Charles II to the Last Year of King James II. Inclusive. Cambridge: Joseph Bentham. pp. 389–403 – via Internet Archive.
- Journal of the House of Commons. Vol. 9. London: His Majesty's Stationery Office. 1803. pp. 245–282 – via Google Books.
- Chronological Table of and Index to the Statutes. Vol. 1: To the End of the Session 59 Vict. Sess. 2 (1895) (13th ed.). London: Her Majesty's Stationery Office. 1896. p. 73 – via Google Books.
- Chronological Table of the Statutes: Covering the Period from 1235 to the End of 1971. London: Her Majesty's Stationery Office. 1972. p. 70. ISBN 978-0-11-840096-1 – via Google Books.
- "Chronological Tables of the Private and Personal Acts: Part 3 (1660–1680)". legislation.gov.uk. The National Archives.

== See also ==
- List of acts of the Parliament of England
