= List of acts of the Parliament of England from 1685 =

This is a list of acts of the Parliament of England for the year 1685.

For acts passed during the period 1707–1800, see the list of acts of the Parliament of Great Britain. See also the list of acts of the Parliament of Scotland, and the list of acts of the Parliament of Ireland.

For acts passed from 1801 onwards, see the list of acts of the Parliament of the United Kingdom. For acts of the devolved parliaments and assemblies in the United Kingdom, see the list of acts of the Scottish Parliament, the list of acts of the Northern Ireland Assembly, and the list of acts and measures of Senedd Cymru; see also the list of acts of the Parliament of Northern Ireland.

For medieval statutes, etc. that are not considered to be acts of Parliament, see the list of English statutes.

See also the List of ordinances and acts of the Parliament of England, 1642–1660 for ordinances and acts passed by the Long Parliament and other bodies without royal assent, and which were not considered to be valid legislation following the Restoration in 1660.

The number shown after each act's title is its chapter number. Acts are cited using this number, preceded by the years of the reign during which the relevant parliamentary session was held; thus the Union with Ireland Act 1800 is cited as "39 & 40 Geo. 3. c. 67", meaning the 67th act passed during the session that started in the 39th year of the reign of George III and which finished in the 40th year of that reign. The modern convention is to use Arabic numerals in citations (thus "41 Geo. 3" rather than "41 Geo. III"). Acts of the last session of the Parliament of Great Britain and the first session of the Parliament of the United Kingdom are both cited as "41 Geo. 3".

Acts passed by the Parliament of England did not have a short title; however, some of these acts have subsequently been given a short title by acts of the Parliament of the United Kingdom, such as the Short Titles Act 1896 (59 & 60 Vict. c. 14).

Acts passed by the Parliament of England were deemed to have come into effect on the first day of the session in which they were passed. Because of this, the years given in the list below may in fact be the year before a particular act was passed.

== 1 Ja. 2 ==
The Parliament of King James II (the 'Loyal Parliament'), which met from 19 May 1685 until 20 November 1685.

James II prevented this parliament from sitting after 1685 and did not call any more parliaments, so he did not pass any laws after 1685.

This session was traditionally cited as 1 Jac. 2 (Chronological Table of the Statutes), 1 Jas. 2 or 1 J. 2.

=== Public acts ===
Short title	Citation	Royal assent
Long title
Revenue Act 1685 (repealed)	1 Ja. 2. c. 1	30 May 1685
An Act for setleing the Revenue on His Majestie for His Life which was setled on His late Majestie for His Life. (Repealed by Taxation (Liquor) Act 1689 (2 Will. & Mar. c. 3))
Attainder, Duke of Monmouth Act 1685 (repealed)	1 Ja. 2. c. 2	16 June 1685
An Act to Attaint James Duke of Monmouth of High-Treason. (Repealed by Statute Law Revision Act 1948 (11 & 12 Geo. 6. c. 62))
Taxation (Wine and Vinegar) Act 1685 (repealed)	1 Ja. 2. c. 3	16 June 1685
An Act for Granting His Majestie an Imposition upon all Wines and Vineger Imported betweene the Foure and twentyeth day of June One thousand six hundred eighty five and the Foure and twentyeth day of June One thousand six hundred ninety and three. (Repealed by Statute Law Revision Act 1863 (26 & 27 Vict. c. 125))
Taxation (Tobacco and Sugar) Act 1685 (repealed)	1 Ja. 2. c. 4	16 June 1685
An Act for Granting to His Majestie an Imposition upon all Tobacco and Sugar Imported betweene the Foure and twentyeth day of June One thousand six hundred eighty five and the Foure and twentyeth day of June One thousand six hundred ninety three. (Repealed by Statute Law Revision Act 1863 (26 & 27 Vict. c. 125))
Taxation Act 1685 or the Linen Duty Act 1685 (repealed)	1 Ja. 2. c. 5	27 June 1685
An Act for Granting an Aid to his Majestie by an Imposition on all French Linnens and all East-India Linnen and severall other Manufactures of India and on all French wrought Silks and Stuffs and on all other wrought Silks and on all Brandyes Imported after the First Day of July One thousand six hundred Eighty five and before the First Day of July One thousand six hundred and ninety. (Repealed by Statute Law Revision Act 1863 (26 & 27 Vict. c. 125))
Importation Act 1685 (repealed)	1 Ja. 2. c. 6	27 June 1685
An Act for repealing certaine Clauses in an Act of Parlyament made in the Nine and twentyeth and Thirtyeth yeares of the Raigne of His late Majestie for Prohibiting French Commoddities. (Note: Taxation, etc. Act 1677 (29 & 30 Cha. 2. c. 1)) (Repealed by Statute Law Revision Act 1863 (26 & 27 Vict. c. 125))
Coinage Act 1685 (repealed)	1 Ja. 2. c. 7	27 June 1685
An Act for Reviveing and continuing Two former Acts (Note: Coin Act 1666 (18 & 19 Cha. 2. c. 5)) (Note: Coinage Act 1672 (25 Cha. 2. c. 8)) for Encouragement of Coynage. (Repealed by Statute Law Revision Act 1863 (26 & 27 Vict. c. 125))
Importing, etc., of Gunpowder, etc. Act 1685 (repealed)	1 Ja. 2. c. 8	27 June 1685
An Act against the Importation of Gun-powder Arms and other Ammunition and Utensils of Warr. (Repealed by Statute Law Revision Act 1863 (26 & 27 Vict. c. 125))
Duchy of Cornwall Act 1685 (repealed)	1 Ja. 2. c. 9	27 June 1685
An Act to Enable His Majestie to make Grants Leases and Copies of Offices Lands and Hereditaments parcell of His Highnesses Dutchy of Cornwall or annexed to the same and for Confirmation of Leases and Grants already made. (Repealed by Statute Law Revision Act 1948 (11 & 12 Geo. 6. c. 62))
Providing of Carriages for the King Act 1685 (repealed)	1 Ja. 2. c. 10	27 June 1685
An Act for the Providing necessary Carriages for His Majestie in His Royall Progresse and Removalls. (Repealed by Statute Law Revision Act 1863 (26 & 27 Vict. c. 125))
Navy and Ordnance Act 1685 (repealed)	1 Ja. 2. c. 11	27 June 1685
An Act for Reviveing an Act (Note: Navy and Ordnance Act 1662 (14 Cha. 2. c. 20)) for Providing of Carriages by Land and by Water for the Use of His Majestyes Navy and Ordnance. (Repealed by Statute Law Revision Act 1863 (26 & 27 Vict. c. 125))
Post Office, etc., Revenues Act 1685 (repealed)	1 Ja. 2. c. 12	27 June 1685
An Act for Consolidating the Estates Tail and Reversion in Fee which His Majestie hath in the Post-Office and Twenty foure thousand pounds per Annum of the Hereditary Excise. (Repealed by Statute Law Revision Act 1863 (26 & 27 Vict. c. 125))
Trade Act 1685 (repealed)	1 Ja. 2. c. 13	27 June 1685
An Act for Reviveing a former Act (Note: Exportation Act 1667 (19 & 20 Cha. 2. c. 10)) for Exporting of Leather. (Repealed by Statute Law Revision Act 1863 (26 & 27 Vict. c. 125))
Moss Troopers Act 1685 (repealed)	1 Ja. 2. c. 14	27 June 1685
An Act for Continuance of Three former Acts (Note: Moss Troopers Act 1662 (14 Cha. 2. c. 22)) (Note: Moss Troopers Act 1666 (18 & 19 Cha. 2. c. 3)) (Note: Moss Troopers Act 1677 (29 & 30 Cha. 2. c. 2)) for Preventing of Theft and Rapine upon the Northerne Borders of England. (Repealed by Statute Law Revision Act 1863 (26 & 27 Vict. c. 125))
Coal Duties for Rebuilding Saint Paul's Act 1685 (repealed)	1 Ja. 2. c. 15	27 June 1685
An Act for Rebuilding Finishing and Adorning of the Cathedrall Church of St. Pauls London. (Repealed by Statute Law Revision Act 1948 (11 & 12 Geo. 6. c. 62))
Great Yarmouth Haven and Pier Repairs (Duties) Act 1685 (repealed)	1 Ja. 2. c. 16	27 June 1685
An Act for Cleareing preserveing Maintaineing and Repaireing the Haven and Piers of Great Yarmouth. (Repealed by Statute Law Revision Act 1948 (11 & 12 Geo. 6. c. 62))
Administration of Intestates' Estate Act 1685 or the Reviving and Continuance Act 1685 (repealed)	1 Ja. 2. c. 17	2 July 1685
An Act for Reviveing and Continuance of severall Acts of Parlyament therein mentioned. (Note: Poor Relief Act 1662 (14 Cha. 2. c. 12)) (Note: Expenses of Sheriffs Act 1662 (14 Cha. 2. c. 21)) (Note: Licensing of the Press Act 1662 (14 Cha. 2. c. 33)) (Note: Death between Verdict and Judgment Act 1665 (17 Cha. 2. c. 8)) (Note: Exchequer Orders Act 1667 (19 & 20 Cha. 2. c. 4)) (Note: Statute of Distribution (22 & 23 Cha. 2. c. 10)) (Note: Sale of Cattle Act 1670 (22 & 23 Cha. 2. c. 19)) (Note: Fines and Forfeitures Act 1670 (22 & 23 Cha. 2. c. 22)) (Note: Navy Act 1670 (22 & 23 Cha. 2. c. 23)) (Note: Tobacco Planting and Plantation Trade Act 1670 (22 & 23 Cha. 2. c. 26)) (Note: Statute of Frauds (29 Cha. 2. c. 3)) (Note: Executors of Executors (Waste) Act 1678 (30 Cha. 2. c. 7)) (Repealed by Administration of Estates Act 1925 (15 & 16 Geo. 5. c. 23) and Statute Law Revision Act 1950 (14 Geo. 6. c. 6))
Ships Act 1685 (repealed)	1 Ja. 2. c. 18	2 July 1685
An Act to encourage the Building of Shipps in England. (Repealed by Customs Law Repeal Act 1825 (6 Geo. 4. c. 105))
Tillage Act 1685 (repealed)	1 Ja. 2. c. 19	2 July 1685
An Additionall Act for the Improvement of Tillage. (Repealed by Importation and Exportation (No. 2) Act 1791 (31 Geo. 3. c. 30))

=== Private acts ===
Short title	Citation	Royal assent
Long title
St. Anne's Parish, Westminster Act 1685 (repealed)	1 Ja. 2. c. 1 Pr.	27 June 1685
An Act to enable the Inhabitants of the Parish of St. Anne, within the Liberty of Westm. to raise Money, to build a Church, to be a Parish Church there. (Repealed by Saint Anne, Soho Act 1965 (c. v))
Bedford Level Act 1685	1 Ja. 2. c. 2 Pr.	27 June 1685
An Act for repealing a Clause for dividing of Commons, in an Act of Parliament made in the 15th Year of King Charles the Second, intituled, "An Act for settling the Draining of the Great Level of the Fens, called Bedford Levell." (Note: Bedford Level Act 1663 (15 Cha. 2. c. 17))
Enabling James Earl of Ossory to make a jointure for a future wife.	1 Ja. 2. c. 3 Pr.	16 June 1685
An Act to enable James Lord Butler of Moore Parke, and Earl of Ossory in the Kingdom of Ireland, to make a Jointure to such Woman as he shall marry.
Naturalization of John Esselbron, Otto Geertz, David Becceler and others.	1 Ja. 2. c. 4 Pr.	16 June 1685
An Act for the Naturalization of John Esselbron, Otto Geertz, David Becceler, and others.
Rebuilding of Earl of Powis's house, Lincoln's Inn Fields.	1 Ja. 2. c. 5 Pr.	27 June 1685
An Act for re-building of the Earl of Powis's House in Lyncolne's Inn Feilds.
Rochester Water Supply Act 1685	1 Ja. 2. c. 6 Pr.	27 June 1685
An Act for the Conveyance of fresh Water through several Grounds unto the City of Rochester.
Naturalization of Magdalen Pellasary and others.	1 Ja. 2. c. 7 Pr.	27 June 1685
An Act for naturalizing Magdalen Pellassary and others.
Naturalization of James Dufay, Theodore Janssen and others.	1 Ja. 2. c. 8 Pr.	27 June 1685
An Act for the naturalizing of James Dufaii, Theodore Jansen, and others.
Enabling Edward Meller to sell lands for payment of debts.	1 Ja. 2. c. 9 Pr.	27 June 1685
An Act to enable Edward Meller to sell Lands, for Payment of Debts.
St. James' Parish, Westminster Act 1685	1 Ja. 2. c. 10 Pr.	2 July 1685
An Act for erecting a new Parish, to be called the Parish of St. James, within the Liberty of Westminster.
Diocese of Bangor Act 1685	1 Ja. 2. c. 11 Pr.	2 July 1685
An Act for the Repair of the Cathedral Church of Bangor, and for the Maintenance of the Choir there, and for the Augmentation of the Revenue of the Bishopric of Bangor; and also for an Augmentation of several Vicarages within the Comportion of Landinum, in the Diocese of Bangor aforesaid.

=== Sources ===
- Raithby, John, ed. (1963) [1819]. "1° Jac. II.". Statutes of the Realm. Vol. 6: The Statutes of King James II, and King William and Queen Mary (1685–1694). London: Dawsons. pp. 1–22 – via HathiTrust.
- Raithby, John, ed. (1819). Statutes of the Realm. Vol. 6: 1685-94 – via British History Online.
- Pickering, Danby, ed. (1763). "Anno primo Jacobi II". The Statutes at Large. Vol. 8: From the Twelfth Year of King Charles II to the Last Year of King James II. Inclusive. Cambridge: Joseph Bentham. pp. 444–482 – via Internet Archive.
- Journals of the House of Commons. Vol. 9. London: His Majesty's Stationery Office. 1803. pp. 713–761 – via Google Books.
- Chronological Table of and Index to the Statutes. Vol. 1: To the End of the Session 59 Vict. Sess. 2 (1895) (13th ed.). London: Her Majesty's Stationery Office. 1896. p. 74 – via Google Books.
- Chronological Table of the Statutes: Covering the Period from 1235 to the End of 1971. London: Her Majesty's Stationery Office. 1972. p. 72. ISBN 978-0-11-840096-1 – via Google Books.
- "Chronological Tables of the Private and Personal Acts: Part 4 (1685–1694)". legislation.gov.uk. The National Archives.

== See also ==
- List of acts of the Parliament of England
