= Statute Law Revision Act 1948 =

Act of the Parliament of the United Kingdom

Statute Law Revision Act 1948 (Note: Section 6(1).)
- Act of Parliament
- Parliament of the United Kingdom
- Long title: An Act for further promoting the Revision of the Statute Law by repealing Enactments which have ceased to be in force or have become unnecessary and for facilitating the publication of a Revised Edition of the Statutes and the Citation of Statutes.
- Citation: 11 & 12 Geo. 6. c. 62
- Introduced by: Frank Soskice (Commons); William Jowitt, 1st Earl Jowitt (Lords)
- Territorial extent: United Kingdom

Dates
- Royal assent: 30 July 1948
- Commencement: 30 July 1948 (Note: The Acts of Parliament (Commencement) Act 1793.)
Other legislation
Amends	See § Repealed enactments
Repeals/revokes	See § Repealed enactments
Amended by	Statute Law Revision Act 1950; Courts Act 1971; Northern Ireland Constitution Act 1973; Administration of Justice Act 1977; Statute Law (Repeals) Act 1993; Statute Law (Repeals) Act 1995

Status: Amended

Text of statute as originally enacted

The Statute Law Revision Act 1948 (11 & 12 Geo. 6. c. 62) is an act of the Parliament of the United Kingdom that repealed enactments from 1235 to 1800 which had ceased to be in force or had become unnecessary. The act was intended, in particular, to facilitate the preparation of a revised edition of the statutes.

Section 5(3) of the Statute Law Revision Act 1950 (14 Geo. 6. c. 6) provided that this act, so far as it repealed chapter 34 of the Statute of Westminster 1285 (13 Edw. 1. St. 1. c. 34), was to be deemed not to have extended to Northern Ireland.

== Passage ==
The Statute Law Revision Bill had its second reading in the House of Lords on 15 June 1948, introduced by the Lord Chancellor, William Jowitt, 1st Earl Jowitt. In addition to ongoing statute law revision, the purpose of the bill was to repeal obsolete acts in order to facilitate the publication of the third edition of the The Statutes Revised.

The bill was referred to the Joint Committee on Consolidation Bills on 21 June 1948, which reported on 28 June 1948, with amendments.

The bill had its second reading in the House of Commons on 16 July 1948, introduced by the Solicitor General, Sir Frank Soskice and was committed to a committee of the whole house.

The bill was granted royal assent on 30 July 1948.

== Subsequent developments ==
Schedule 1 to the act was repealed by section 1(1) of, and the first schedule to, the Statute Law Revision Act 1950 (14 Geo. 6. c. 6), which came into force on 23 May 1950.

The words "to the court of the county palatine of Lancaster or" in section 2 of the act were repealed by section 56(4) of, and part II of schedule 11 to, the Courts Act 1971, which came into force on 1 January 1972.

Section 6(2) of the act was repealed by section 41(1)(a) of, and part I of schedule 6 to, the Northern Ireland Constitution Act 1973, which came into force on 18 July 1973.

Section 2 of the act was repealed by section 32(4) of, and part V of schedule 5 to, the Administration of Justice Act 1977, which came into force on 29 July 1977.

The enactments which were repealed (whether for the whole or any part of the United Kingdom) by the act were repealed so far as they extended to the Isle of Man by section 1(1) of, and schedule 1 to, the Statute Law Revision (Isle of Man) Act 1991, which came into force on 25 July 1991.

In a report dated 6 April 1993, the Law Commission and the Scottish Law Commission said that sections 3(1)(c) to (f) and 4 "provided in general terms for the repeal of or omission of various recurrent words relating to obsolete civil procedure (which occurred mainly in now obsolete statutory provisions for the recovery of penalties by common informers), to Scottish stewartries (which occurred mainly in obsolete definitions of "sheriff" or "county") and to self-governing Dominions of the Old Commonwealth". The provision relating to Scottish stewartries had been intended to give effect to section 7 of the Interpretation Act 1889 (52 & 53 Vict. c. 63) which had been repealed as obsolete by the Interpretation Act 1978. They said that the "utility of these provisions proved to be marginal and in practice they were little used" and that they were "spent or unnecessary now".

Sections 1, 3(1)(c)–(f) and 4 of the act were repealed by section 1(1) of, and group 1 of part XVI of schedule 1 to, the Statute Law (Repeals) Act 1993, which came into force on 5 November 1993.

In 1995, the Law Commission and the Scottish Law Commission recommended that section 5 and schedule 2 be repealed.

Section 5 of, and the second schedule to, the act were repealed by section 1(1) of, and part IV of schedule 1 to, the Statute Law (Repeals) Act 1995, which came into force on 8 November 1995.

== Provisions ==
=== Repealed enactments ===
Section 1 of the act provided, amongst other things, that the enactments described in the first schedule to this act were repealed, subject to the provisions of this act and subject to the exceptions and qualifications in that schedule.

Section 3 of the act authorised the omission from any revised edition of the statutes published by authority of the following:

- (a) words of enactment, whether in the form "Be it enacted by the King’s (or Queen’s) most excellent Majesty by and with the advice and consent of the Lords Spiritual and Temporal and Commons in this present Parliament assembled and by the authority of the same as follows" or in any other form or to the like effect, and words such as "item", "also" and "that" referring to or consequential on words of enactment
- (b) clauses of attestation added to ancient statutes
- (c) in any enactment relating to courts now merged in the Supreme Court the words "debt", "suit", "bill", "plaint", "proceeding" or any of those words occurring after or in connection with the word "action"
- (d) in any enactment relating to Scotland the word "stewartry" occurring in connection with the words "shire", "sheriffdom" or "county" and the word "stewart" occurring in connection with the word "sheriff", whether any of those words be used in the singular or the plural
- (e) the words "of", "and" or "or" where used in connection with any word omitted by virtue of paragraphs (c) and (d) of this subsection; and
- (f) enactments or words in respect of matters exclusively relating to territory within the jurisdiction of self-governing Dominion

Section 4 of the act repealed:

- (a) words barring the allowance in any action or proceeding of any essoin or privilege or protection or wager of law or imparlance or of bail or mainprise or benefit of clergy; and
- (b) the words “that part of Britain called” or “that part of the United Kingdom called,” or words to the like effect, where used before the words “England”, “Scotland” or “Ireland.”

=== Short titles ===
Section 5 of, and schedule 2 to, the act authorised the citation of 158 earlier acts by short titles. The acts to which short titles were given were passed between 1236 and 1860.

=== Enactments repealed in full ===
- Henry III
  - 20 Hen. 3. c. 2
  - 20 Hen. 3. c. 9
  - 52 Hen. 3. c. 2
  - 52 Hen. 3. c. 17
- Edward I
  - 3 Edw. 1. c. 29
  - 13 Edw. 1. c. 34
  - 13 Edw. 1. c. 35
  - 13 Edw. 1. c. 45
  - 13 Edw. 1. c. 49
  - 25 Edw. 1. c. 10
  - 25 Edw. 1. c. 22
  - 25 Edw. 1. c. 25
- Edward II
  - 9 Edw. 2. c. 5
  - 17 Edw. 2 Stat. 2. c. 16
  - 17 Edw. 2 Stat. 2. c. 18
- Edward III
  - 1 Edw. 3. Stat. 2. c. 16
  - 5 Edw. 3. c. 11
  - 18 Edw. 3. Stat. 2. c. 2
  - 25 Edw. 3. Stat. 5. c. 3
  - 27 Edw. 3. Stat. 1. c. 2
  - 31 Edw. 3. Stat. 1. c. 3
  - 31 Edw. 3. Stat. 1. c. 14
  - 34 Edw. 3. c. 12
  - 34 Edw. 3. c. 15
  - 42 Edw. 3. c. 4
  - 42 Edw. 3. c. 11
  - 45 Edw. 3. c. 3
- Richard II
  - 3 Ric. 2. c. 3
  - 7 Ric. 2. c. 3
  - 7 Ric. 2. c. 4
  - 12 Ric. 2. c. 15
  - 13 Ric. 2. St. 2. c. 1
  - 13 Ric. 2. St. 2. c. 2
  - 13 Ric. 2. St. 2. c. 3
  - 14 Ric. 2. c. 11
  - 16 Ric. 2. c. 6
  - 17 Ric. 2. c. 8

[...]

- Charles I
  - 1 Cha. 1. c. 2
- Charles II
  - 12 Cha. 2. c. 11
  - 12 Cha. 2. c. 12
  - 12 Cha. 2. c. 31
  - 13 Cha. 2. St. 1. c. 15
  - 13 Cha. 2. St. 2. c. 4
  - 14 Cha. 2. c. 2
  - 14 Cha. 2. c. 12
  - 14 Cha. 2. c. 25
  - 14 Cha. 2. c. 27
  - 14 Cha. 2. c. 29
  - 15 Cha. 2. c. 1
  - 18 & 19 Cha. 2. c. 7
  - 19 & 20 Cha. 2. c. 2
  - 22 Cha. 2. c. 2
  - 22 Cha. 2. c. 6
  - 22 Cha. 2. c. 7
  - 22 Cha. 2. c. 10
  - 22 & 23 Cha. 2. c. 14
  - 22 & 23 Cha. 2. c. 15
  - 22 & 23 Cha. 2. c. 16
  - 25 Cha. 2. c. 3
  - 25 Cha. 2. c. 10
  - 27 Cha. 2. (act for rebuilding Northampton)
  - 29 Cha. 2. c. 6
  - 29 Cha. 2. c. 10
  - 29 & 30 Cha. 2. c. 8
- James II
  - 1 Ja. 2. c. 2
  - 1 Ja. 2. c. 9
  - 1 Ja. 2. c. 15
  - 1 Ja. 2. c. 16
- William and Mary
  - 1 Will. & Mar. c. 11

[...]

  - 39 & 40 Geo. 3. c. 43
  - 39 & 40 Geo. 3. c. 54
  - 39 & 40 Geo. 3. c. 77
  - 39 & 40 Geo. 3. c. 78
  - 39 & 40 Geo. 3. c. 97
  - Exchequer Bills Act 1800 (39 & 40 Geo. 3. c. 109)

== See also ==
- Statute Law Revision Act

== Bibliography ==
- Halsbury's Statutes. Fourth Edition. 2008 Reissue. Volume 41. Page 755.
- The Public General Acts and the Church Assembly Measures of 1948. HMSO. 1948. Volume II.
- HL Deb vol 155, cols 1135 to 1136, vol 156, cols 756 to 761, 926 to 927 and 1083 to 1084, vol 157, cols 14 , 179, 380, 576 and 1272, HC Deb vol 450, col 197W, vol 452, col 879 to 880, vol 453, cols 1650 to 1659.
