= List of acts of the Parliament of England from 1666 =

This is a list of acts of the Parliament of England for the year 1666.

For acts passed during the period 1707–1800, see the list of acts of the Parliament of Great Britain. See also the list of acts of the Parliament of Scotland, and the list of acts of the Parliament of Ireland.

For acts passed from 1801 onwards, see the list of acts of the Parliament of the United Kingdom. For acts of the devolved parliaments and assemblies in the United Kingdom, see the list of acts of the Scottish Parliament, the list of acts of the Northern Ireland Assembly, and the list of acts and measures of Senedd Cymru; see also the list of acts of the Parliament of Northern Ireland.

For medieval statutes, etc. that are not considered to be acts of Parliament, see the list of English statutes.

See also the List of ordinances and acts of the Parliament of England, 1642–1660 for ordinances and acts passed by the Long Parliament and other bodies without royal assent, and which were not considered to be valid legislation following the Restoration in 1660.

The number shown after each act's title is its chapter number. Acts are cited using this number, preceded by the years of the reign during which the relevant parliamentary session was held; thus the Union with Ireland Act 1800 is cited as "39 & 40 Geo. 3. c. 67", meaning the 67th act passed during the session that started in the 39th year of the reign of George III and which finished in the 40th year of that reign. The modern convention is to use Arabic numerals in citations (thus "41 Geo. 3" rather than "41 Geo. III"). Acts of the last session of the Parliament of Great Britain and the first session of the Parliament of the United Kingdom are both cited as "41 Geo. 3".

Acts passed by the Parliament of England did not have a short title; however, some of these acts have subsequently been given a short title by acts of the Parliament of the United Kingdom, such as the Short Titles Act 1896 (59 & 60 Vict. c. 14).

Acts passed by the Parliament of England were deemed to have come into effect on the first day of the session in which they were passed. Because of this, the years given in the list below may in fact be the year before a particular act was passed.

== 18 & 19 Cha. 2 ==
The sixth session and the first part of the seventh session of the 2nd Parliament of King Charles II (the 'Cavalier Parliament') which met from 21 September 1666 until 8 February 1667, and then from 10 October 1667 until 19 December 1667.

=== Public acts ===
- cc. 1–5 received royal assent on 18 January 1667 (sixth session of the Cavalier Parliament)
- cc. 6–13 received royal assent on 8 February 1667, when the sixth session was prorogued

This session was also traditionally cited as 18 & 19 Car. 2, 18 & 19 Chas. 2 or 18 & 19 C. 2.

Cited as "18 & 19 Car. 2" (18 & 19 Cha. 2) in The Statutes of the Realm, and separately as "18 Car. 2" (18 Cha. 2) and "19 Car. 2" (19 Cha. 2) in Ruffhead-Pickering's The Statutes at Large. Equivalences: 18 & 19 Cha. 2 (cc. 1–5) = 18 Cha. 2 (cc. 1–5); 18 & 19 Cha. 2 (cc. 6–13) = 19 Cha. 2 (1–8).

| Short title | Citation | Royal assent |
Long title
| Taxation Act 1666 (repealed) | 18 & 19 Cha. 2. c. 1 (Note: This is the chapter in The Statutes of the Realm.); 18 Cha. 2. c. 1 (Note: This is the chapter in the Statutes at Large.) | 18 January 1667 |
An Act for raising Moneys by a Poll, and otherwise towards the Maintenance of the present Warr. (Repealed by Statute Law Revision Act 1863 (26 & 27 Vict. c. 125))
| Importation Act 1666 (repealed) | 18 & 19 Cha. 2. c. 2; 18 Cha. 2. c. 2 | 18 January 1667 |
An Act against importing Cattell from Ireland and other parts beyond the Seas and Fish taken by Forreigners. (Repealed by Customs Law Repeal Act 1825 (6 Geo. 4. c. 105)
| Moss Troopers Act 1666 (repealed) | 18 & 19 Cha. 2. c. 3; 18 Cha. 2. c. 3 | 18 January 1667 |
An Act to continue a former Act (Note: Moss Troopers Act 1662 (14 Cha. 2. c. 22)) for preventing of Thefte and Rapine upon the Northerne Borders of England. (Repealed by Statute Law Revision Act 1863 (26 & 27 Vict. c. 125))
| Burying in Wool Act 1666 (repealed) | 18 & 19 Cha. 2. c. 4; 18 Cha. 2. c. 4 | 18 January 1667 |
An Act for Burying in Woollen onely. (Repealed by Statute Law Revision Act 1863 (26 & 27 Vict. c. 125))
| Coin Act 1666 (repealed) | 18 & 19 Cha. 2. c. 5; 18 Cha. 2. c. 5 | 18 January 1667 |
An Act for encourageing of Coynage. (Repealed by Coinage Act 1870 (33 & 34 Vict. c. 10))
| Taxation (No. 2) Act 1666 (repealed) | 18 & 19 Cha. 2. c. 6; 19 Cha. 2. c. 1 | 8 February 1667 |
An Act Explanatory of the Act for raiseing Moneyes by a Poll and otherwise towards the Maintenance of this present Warr. (Repealed by Statute Law Revision Act 1863 (26 & 27 Vict. c. 125))
| Fire of London Disputes Act 1666 (repealed) | 18 & 19 Cha. 2. c. 7; 19 Cha. 2. c. 2 | 8 February 1667 |
An Act for erecting a Judicature for Determination of Differences touching Houses burned or demolished by reason of the late Fire which happened in London. (Repealed by Statute Law Revision Act 1948 (11 & 12 Geo. 6. c. 62))
| Rebuilding of London Act 1666 (repealed) | 18 & 19 Cha. 2. c. 8; 19 Cha. 2. c. 3 | 8 February 1667 |
An Act for rebuilding the Citty of London. (Repealed by City of London Sewers Act 1848 (11 & 12 Vict. c. clxiii))
| Poor Prisoners Act 1666 (repealed) | 18 & 19 Cha. 2. c. 9; 19 Cha. 2. c. 4 | 8 February 1667 |
An Act for reliefe of Poore Prisoners and setting of them on worke. (Repealed by Statute Law Revision Act 1863 (26 & 27 Vict. c. 125))
| Replevins in Wales and Counties Palatine Act 1666 (repealed) | 18 & 19 Cha. 2. c. 10; 19 Cha. 2. c. 5 | 8 February 1667 |
An Act extending a former Act concerning Replevins and Avowries to the Principallity of Wales and the County Palatines. (Repealed by Civil Procedure Acts Repeal Act 1879 (42 & 43 Vict. c. 59))
| Cestui que Vie Act 1666 | 18 & 19 Cha. 2. c. 11; 19 Cha. 2. c. 6 | 8 February 1667 |
An Act for Redresse of Inconveniencies by want of Proofe of the Deceases of Persons beyond the Seas or absenting themselves, upon whose Lives Estates doe depend.
| Navy Act 1666 (repealed) | 18 & 19 Cha. 2. c. 12; 19 Cha. 2. c. 7 | 8 February 1667 |
An Act to prevent the Disturbances of Seamen and others and to preserve the Stores belonging to His Majesties Navy Royall. (Repealed by Statute Law Revision Act 1863 (26 & 27 Vict. c. 125))
| Taxation (No. 3) Act 1666 (repealed) | 18 & 19 Cha. 2. c. 13; 19 Cha. 2. c. 8 | 8 February 1667 |
An Act for granting the Summe of Twelve hundred fifty six thousand three hundred forty seaven pounds thirteene shillings to the Kings Majestie towards the Maintenance of the present Warr. (Repealed by Statute Law Revision Act 1863 (26 & 27 Vict. c. 125))

=== Private acts ===
| Short title | Citation | Royal assent |
Long title
| Earl of Cleveland's Estate Act 1666 | 18 & 19 Cha. 2. c. 1 Pr. | 18 January 1667 |
An Act for enlarging the Time given by a former Act for Redemption of Mortgages made by the Earl of Cleveland. (Note: Earl of Cleveland's Estate Act 1660 (12 Cha. 2. c. 33 Pr.))
| Naturalization of Lady Isabella Arlington Act 1666 | 18 & 19 Cha. 2. c. 2 Pr. | 18 January 1667 |
An Act for naturalizing of Isabella of Nassaw, Wife of the Right Honourable the Lord Arlington, One of His Majesty's Principal Secretaries of State.
| Lady Elizabeth Noell's jointure. | 18 & 19 Cha. 2. c. 3 Pr. | 18 January 1667 |
An Act for Supply of Part of the Jointure of the Lady Elizabeth Noel.
| Settling John Bodnell's Estate Act 1666 | 18 & 19 Cha. 2. c. 4 Pr. | 18 January 1667 |
An Act for settling the Estate of John Bodnell Esquire, deceased.
| Lord Strangford's Estate Act 1666 | 18 & 19 Cha. 2. c. 5 Pr. | 18 January 1667 |
An additional Act for enabling a Sale of Lands, to pay the Lord Strangford's Debts.
| Naturalization of Hesther Le Lou. | 18 & 19 Cha. 2. c. 6 Pr. | 8 February 1667 |
An Act for the naturalizing of Esther Le Lou, the Daughter and Coheir of Gideon Le Lou, Lord of Colombiers in Normandy, the now Wife of the Right Honourable Denzell Lord Holles, of Ifeild.
| Confirming, explaining and enlarging an Act concerning Lord Abergavenny's estate. | 18 & 19 Cha. 2. c. 7 Pr. | 8 February 1667 |
An Act for confirming, explaining, and enlarging, an Act, intituled, An Act to enable John Lord Abergaveny, Son and Heir of Henry late Lord Abergaveny, to sell certain Lands, for Payment of his Debts, and Preferment of his Brother and Sisters. (Note: Lord Abergavenny's Estate Act 1661 (13 Cha. 2 St. 1. c. 11 Pr.))
| Illegitimation of Lady Anne Roos' Children Act 1666 | 18 & 19 Cha. 2. c. 8 Pr. | 8 February 1667 |
An Act for the Illegitimation of the Children of the Lady Anne Roos.
| Edward Russell's Estate Act 1666 | 18 & 19 Cha. 2. c. 9 Pr. | 8 February 1667 |
An Act for Sale of a Messuage in Chiswicke, for Payment of the Debts of Edward Russell Esquire.
| Sir Seymour Shirley's Estate Act 1666 | 18 & 19 Cha. 2. c. 10 Pr. | 8 February 1667 |
An Act for Confirmation of a Settlement of the Estate of Sir Seymour Shirley Baronet.
| Settling moiety of manor of Iron Acton on Sir John Pointz. | 18 & 19 Cha. 2. c. 11 Pr. | 8 February 1667 |
An Act for settling the Moiety of the Manor of Iron Acton on Sir John Poyntz.
| Settling an estate in trust for benefit of Mrs Pride and her children. | 18 & 19 Cha. 2. c. 12 Pr. | 8 February 1667 |
An Act for settling an Estate in Trust for the Benefit of Mrs. Elizabeth Pride and her Children.
| Uniting Churches (Swafham Prior, Cambridgeshire) Act 1666 | 18 & 19 Cha. 2. c. 13 Pr. | 8 February 1667 |
An Act for the ascertaining the Bounds of the several Rectories of Swaffham St. Cyriac and of Sawffham St. Marie's, within the Town of Swaffham Prior, in the County of Cambridge, and for the uniting of the Two Churches there.
| Restitution in blood of Francis Scawen. | 18 & 19 Cha. 2. c. 14 Pr. | 8 February 1667 |
An Act for the restoring of Francis Scawen Gentleman in Blood.
| Naturalization of Dame Mary Frazer and others. | 18 & 19 Cha. 2. c. 15 Pr. | 8 February 1667 |
An Act for naturalizing Dame Mary Frazer and others.
| Henry Kendall's Estate Act 1666 | 18 & 19 Cha. 2. c. 16 Pr. | 8 February 1667 |
An Act to enable a Sale of Lands, for Payment of the Debts of Henry Kendall Esquire.
| Henry Mildmay's Estate Act 1666 | 18 & 19 Cha. 2. c. 17 Pr. | 8 February 1667 |
An Act for selling Part of the Lands of Henry Mildmay Esquire deceased, for Payment of his Debts, and making Provision for his Children.
| Leicester Grosvenor's Estate Act 1666 | 18 & 19 Cha. 2. c. 18 Pr. | 8 February 1667 |
An Act to enable Leicester Grosevenor and his Trustees to sell certain Lands, for Payment of Debts.

=== Sources ===
- Raithby, John, ed. (1963) [1819]. "18° & 19° Car. II.". Statutes of the Realm. Vol. 5: The Statutes of King Charles I and King Charles II (1625–1680). London: Dawsons. pp. 584–623 – via HathiTrust.
- Raithby, John, ed. (1819). Statutes of the Realm. Vol. 5: 1628-80 – via British History Online.
- Pickering, Danby, ed. (1763). "Anno decimo octavo Caroli II". The Statutes at Large. Vol. 8: From the Twelfth Year of King Charles II to the Last Year of King James II. Inclusive. Cambridge: Joseph Bentham. pp. 226–232 – via Internet Archive.
- Pickering, Danby, ed. (1763). "Anno decimo nono Caroli II". The Statutes at Large. Vol. 8: From the Twelfth Year of King Charles II to the Last Year of King James II. Inclusive. Cambridge: Joseph Bentham. pp. 232–257 – via Internet Archive.
- Chronological Table of and Index to the Statutes. Vol. 1: To the End of the Session 59 Vict. Sess. 2 (1895) (13th ed.). London: Her Majesty's Stationery Office. 1896. p. 71 – via Google Books.
- Chronological Table of the Statutes: Covering the Period from 1235 to the End of 1971. London: Her Majesty's Stationery Office. 1972. p. 69. ISBN 978-0-11-840096-1 – via Google Books.
- "Acts of the English Parliament from 1666". legislation.gov.uk. The National Archives.
- "Chronological Tables of the Private and Personal Acts: Part 3 (1660–1680)". legislation.gov.uk. The National Archives.

== See also ==
- List of acts of the Parliament of England
