= John Raithby =

John Raithby (1766–1826) was an English lawyer and author of legal reference works.

Raithby was born in Edenham, Lincolnshire. After an early career in writing, having published a novel in 1792 titled Delineations of the heart; or, the history of Henry Bennet, in January 1795 he was admitted as a member of Lincoln's Inn, and subsequently called to the bar to practice in the Court of Chancery.

In 1798 Raithby anonymously published The Study and Practice of the Law, considered in their various relations to society, a treatise which some incorrectly attributed to Sir James Mackintosh until a second edition was published under his name in 1816. In 1811 he published the treatise The Law and Principle of Money considered. His legal writings led to him being appointed a Commissioner of Bankruptcy in the Court of Chancery, and he was nominated to the second Royal Commission on Public Records as a sub-Commissioner.

Raithby worked with Thomas Edlyne Tomlins on editing The Statutes at Large series, which collected acts of Parliament, taking on sole responsibility as editor in 1811 at the third volume. He also compiled alphabetical and chronological indexes to the Statutes of the Realm, published by the Record Commission in 1824 and 1828.

Raithby died at The Grove, Highgate in London on the 31st of August 1826, leaving a widow.
