= Danby Pickering =

English legal writer

Danby Pickering (fl. 1769) was an English legal writer.

== Biography ==
Born circa 1716 (christened 17 March that year), the son of Danby Pickering of Hatton Garden, Middlesex by his wife Mary (née Horson), Pickering was admitted, on 28 June 1737, a student at Gray's Inn, where he was called to the bar on 8 May 1741. He married Ann Walter or Walten on 12 July 1736, and died on 24 March 1781.

== Works ==
Pickering re-edited the original four volumes of Modern Reports (1682–1703), with the supplements of 1711, 1713, and 1716, under the title Modern Reports, or Select Cases adjudged in the Courts of King's Bench, Chancery, Common Pleas, and Exchequer, since the Restoration of His Majesty King Charles II to the Fourth of Queen Anne, London, 1757. He also edited Sir Henry Finch's Law, or a Discourse thereof in Four Books, London, 1759.

His major work was an abridgment of the Statute Book, entitled The Statutes at Large, from Magna Charta to the end of the Eleventh Parliament of Great Britain, Cambridge, 1762–9, 24 vols.; continued with his name on the title-page to 1807, and thereafter without his name until 1809. The first volume of the series starts in the year 1225, or 9 Hen III, when Henry III confirmed Magna Carta. The Latin of the early years is translated into English in a dual column structure. The dual column is employed as well for the translations from Norman French, which continue throughout the reign of Edward IV. Although he was nominally a French king, Richard III appears to have governed (while he did) in the English tongue.

== Bibliography ==
Statutes at Large:

- Edition by Danby Pickering
  1. Volume 1 – Magna Charta to 14 Edward III – 1225 to 1340 – also
  2. Volume 2 – 15 Edward III to 13 Henry IV – 1341 to 1411 – also
  3. Volume 3 – 1 Henry V to 22 Edward IV – 1413 to 1482–83 – also
  4. Volume 4 – 1 Richard III to 31 Henry VIII – 1483–84 to 1539 – also – also
  5. Volume 5 – 32 Henry VIII to 7 Edward VI – 1540 to 1552-3
  6. Volume 6 – 1 Mary to 35 Elizabeth – 1554 to 1592–93 – also
  7. Volume 7 – 39 Elizabeth to 12 Charles II – 1597–98 to 1660
  8. Volume 8 – 12 Charles II to Last James II – 1660 to 1685 (James II did not call any parliaments after 1687)
  9. Volume 9 – 1 William and Mary to 8 William III – 1688 to 1695–96 – also
  10. Volume 10 – 8 William III to 2 Anne – 1696–97 to 1703
  11. Volume 11 – 2 Anne to 8 Anne – 1703 to 1709 – also
  12. Volume 12 – 8 Anne to 12 Anne – 1709 to 1712
  13. Volume 13 – 12 Anne to 5 George I 1712 to 1718–19 – also – also
  14. Volume 14 – 5 George I to 9 George I – 1718–19 to 1722–23 – also
  15. Volume 15 – 9 George I to 2 George II – 1722–23 to 1728–29 – also
  16. Volume 16 – 2 George II to 9 George II – 1728–29 to 1735–36
  17. Volume 17 – 9 George II to 15 George II – 1735–36 to 1741–42
  18. Volume 18 – 15 George II to 20 George II – 1741–42 to 1746–47
  19. Volume 19 – 20 George II to 23 George II – 1746–47 to 1749–50
  20. Volume 20 – 23 George II to 26 George II – 1749–50 to 1753 – also
  21. Volume 21 – 26 George II to 30 George II – 1753 to 1756–57 – also
  22. Volume 22 – 30 George II to 32 George II – 1756–67 to 1758–59 – also
  23. Volume 23 – 33 George II to 1 George III – 1759–60 to 1760–61
  24. Volume 24 – Index
  25. Volume 25 – 2 George III – 1761–62 – and 3 George III – 1762–63 – also
  26. Volume 26 – 4 George III 1763–64 – and 5 George III – 1765 – also – also – also
  27. Volume 27 – 6 George III – 1765–66 – and 7 George III – 1766–67 – also
  28. Volume 28 – 8 George III – 1767–68 – 9 George III – 1768–69 – and 10 George III – 1770 – also
  29. Volume 29 – 11 George III – 1770–71 – and 12 George III – 1772
  30. Volume 30 – 13 George III – 1772–73 – and 14 George III – 1774 – also
  31. Volume 31 – 15 George III – 1774–75 – and 16 George III – 1775–76 – and 17 George III – 1776–77
  32. Volume 32 – 18 George III – 1777–78 – and 19 George III – 1778–79
  33. Volume 33 – 20 George III – 1779–80 – and 21 George III – 1780–81
  34. Volume 34 – 22 George III – 1781–82 – and 23 George III – 1782–83 – and 24 George III – 1783–84
  35. Volume 35 – 25 George III – 1785 – and 26 George III – 1786
  36. Volume 36 – 27 George III – 1787 – and 28 George III – 1787–88 – and 29 George III – 1789
  37. Volume 37 – 30 George III 1790 and 31 George III – 1790–91 and 32 George III – 1792
  38. Volume 38 – Index from 1 George III (1760) to 32 George III (1792) – also
  39. Volume 39, Part 1 – 33 George III – 1792–93 – and 34 George III – 1794
  40. Volume 40, Part 1 – 35 George III – 1794–95 and Part 2 – 36 George III - 1795–96
  41. Volume 41, Part 1 – 37 George III – 1796–97 – and Part 2 – 38 George III – 1797–98
  42. Volume 42, Part 1 – 39 George III – 1798–99 and Part 2 - 40 George III-1798-1800
  43. Volume 43, Part 1 – 41 George III (UK) – 1801 and Part 2 - 42 George III-1801-1802
  44. Volume 44, Part 1 – 43 George III – 1802–03
  45. Volume 45, Part 1 – 44 George III – 1803–04 and Part 2 – 45 George III – 1803–04
  46. Volume 46 – 46 George III – 1806
