= Relief of the Poor Act 1696 =

Act of the Parliament of England

- Act of Parliament
- Parliament of England
- Long title: An Act for supplying some Defects in the Laws for the Relief of the Poor of this Kingdom.
- Citation: 8 & 9 Will. 3. c. 30
- Territorial extent: England and Wales

Dates
- Royal assent: 16 April 1697
- Commencement: 1 May 1697 (Note: Section 1.)
- Repealed: 1 October 1927
Other legislation
Amended by	Poor Act 1697; Statute Law Revision Act 1867; Statute Law Revision Act 1888
Repealed by	Poor Law Act 1927
Relates to	Poor Relief Act 1601; Poor Relief Act 1662; Poor Relief Act 1691; Poor Act 1712

Status: Repealed

Text of statute as originally enacted

Poor Act 1697
- Act of Parliament
- Parliament of England
- Long title: An Act for explaining an Act made the last Session of Parliament, entituled, "An Act for supplying some Defects in the Laws for the Relief of the Poor of this Kingdome."
- Citation: 9 Will. 3. c. 11 (Note: This is the citation in The Statutes of the Realm.); 9 & 10 Will. 3. c. 11 (Note: This is the citation in The Statutes at Large.)
- Territorial extent: England and Wales

Dates
- Royal assent: 2 April 1698
- Commencement: 3 December 1697 (Note: Start of session.)
- Repealed: 15 July 1867
Other legislation
Amends	Relief of the Poor Act 1696
Repealed by	Statute Law Revision Act 1867
Relates to	Poor Relief Act 1601; Poor Relief Act 1691

Status: Repealed

Text of statute as originally enacted

The Relief of the Poor Act 1696 (8 & 9 Will. 3. c. 30), formally titled An Act for supplying some Defects in the Laws for the Relief of the Poor of this Kingdom, was an act of the Parliament of England. The act was a welfare statute, operating within the framework of the Poor Relief Act 1601 (43 Eliz. 1. c. 2). The act is perhaps best remembered for its expansion of the requirement that welfare recipients be marked to indicate their status, in this case by wearing a prominent badge.

== Badging the poor ==
The act required that all welfare recipients, including the wife and children of the head of a household receiving welfare, wear badges prominently on their right shoulders. These badges would contain the first letter of their parish name, followed by the letter "P". Thus, a recipient from Ampthill parish would wear a badge reading "AP". In her Curious Punishments of Bygone Days, Alice Morse Earle noted that this practice was also seen in Colonial America, though the badge format might be different. For instance, a badge for a New York pauper would read "N.Y.", while in Virginia, the badge might contain the parish name rather than an abbreviation, and in other cases might simply read "P.P." for "public pauper". A similar law also existed in Pennsylvania.

This badging practice was distinct from the earlier practice of issuing beggars' badges, which predated the Elizabethan Poor Act. One Act which authorised this was the Poor Act 1555 (2 & 3 Ph. & M. c. 5).

An earlier statute, the Poor Relief Act 1691 (3 Will. & Mar. c. 11), required the overseers of the poor to record the names of all those receiving welfare in their parishes. This statute was intended to limit abuse of funds by overseers. The act added the badging requirement for the same reason. The penalty to paupers who did not wear badges was whipping and imprisonment, and overseers providing relief to such paupers were to be fined 20 shillings. One change to the badge requirement came with the Relief of the Poor Act 1782 (22 Geo. 3. c. 83), which allowed "paupers of good character" to leave off the badge. Badging continued to be practiced until 1810, when it was repealed by Poor Act 1810 (50 Geo. 3. c. 52), though by the end of the 18th century it was noted as "almost universally neglected".

The badge continued to be thought of as a means of checking what is now called a welfare trap or poverty trap, wherein people prefer receiving benefits than working. One report ordered by the House of Commons of England suggested that temporarily restoring the badge would serve to dissuade such individuals from seeking out relief. The report further argued that "the Poor ought to know and feel that the eye of the public is upon them ready to check fraud and restrain importunity", and that the badge was one such means. Charles Jerram, an evangelical priest of the Church of England, did not go so far as to call for the revival of the badge, but did call for some means by which to distinguish "the profligate pauper from the unfortunate and virtuous sufferer".

Joseph Townsend, on the other hand, harshly criticised the badging practice as applying a badge of shame on the poor in exchange for relief. He further noted that many overseers disregarded the badge requirement, risking the fine. Townsend also argued that the badge had no real effect on those who it was truly seeking to dissuade from seeking out relief, for they would have no qualms about wearing the badge, while the more modest poor "would sooner die than wear it".

== Year's service rule ==
Part of the system involved the determination of what parish to which a recipient belonged, and was thereby responsible to provide relief to that recipient. Under the earlier Poor Relief Act 1662 (14 Cha. 2. c. 12) a parish could banish those poor unable to rent lodgings of at least £10 per year within forty days of their arrival in the parish. Those banished this way would be sent back to their parish of birth, or where they had resided in the prior three years.

The act provided that a worker remaining "in the same service" for one year was given the right to settle in the parish, and thereafter would not be subject to expulsion when beginning to draw relief. The specifics required to gain settlement under this provision were explored in a number of cases. For instance, in R v Ulverstone, a woman servant was discharged from her contract to serve from Whitsuntide one year until the next year—a period of greater than 365 days that year—before its end, but after 365 days had elapsed. The Court held that despite being discharged before the end of the contract, she had served for one full year and was entitled to settle in the parish.

Another aspect of this rule is how "same service" is determined. It was possible for the circumstances, such as the contract of hiring, the master, or even the location to change to some degree without resetting the one year requirement. For example, in R v Overton, a servant was engaged from March until Michaelmas, and then hired for a full year. Said servant left in April—less than one year into the contract, but more than one year since he was first engaged. The court held that the two periods of service could be connected, and the servant was entitled settlement rights under the Poor Law.

== Subsequent developments ==
Sections 1, 4 and 7 of the act were repealed by section 1 of, and the first schedule to, the Statute Law Revision Act 1948 (11 & 12 Geo. 6. c. 62), which came into force on 30 July 1948.

The whole act was repealed by section 245(1) of, and the eleventh schedule to, Poor Law Act 1927 (17 & 18 Geo. 5. c. 14), which came into force on 1 October 1927.

== See also ==
- Poor relief
- Poverty in the United Kingdom
- Poor Law Amendment Act 1834
- Badge of shame

== Bibliography ==
- Bicheno, James Ebenezer (1817). An Inquiry into the Nature of Benevolence. London: Rowland Hunter. hdl:2027/umn.31951002316716x.
- Cloe, Lyman H. (April 1939). "Unemployment Compensation Background: Some Extra-Legal Considerations". University of Kansas City Law Review. 7 (3): 147–172 – via HeinOnline.
- Cook, Chris; Stevenson, John (2001). The Longman Handbook of Modern British History, 1714–2001 (4th ed.). London: Routledge. ISBN 978-0-582-42394-7.
- Earle, Alice Morse (1896). Curious Punishments of Bygone Days. Chicago: Herbert S. Stone & Co. hdl:2027/hvd.32044020031191.
- Earle, Alice Morse (1910) [First published 1903]. Two Centuries of Costume in America: MDCXX–MDCCCXX (New ed.). New York: Macmillan Company. hdl:2027/mdp.39015062306702.
- Higginbotham, Peter (2012). "Badging the Poor". The Workhouse Encyclopedia. Stroud, England: History Press. ISBN 978-0-7524-7719-0.
- Jerram, Charles (1818). Considerations on the Impolicy and Pernicious Tendency of the Poor Laws. London: Rest Fenner. hdl:2027/ien.35556000115055.
- Linder, Marc (1989). "The Joint Employment Doctrine: Clarifying Joint Legislative-Judicial Confusion". Hamline Journal of Law and Public Policy. 10 (2): 321–345 – via HeinOnline.
- Nicoll, S. W. (1818). A Summary View of the Report and Evidence relative to the Poor Laws Published by Order of the House of Commons, with Observations and Suggestions. York: W. Alexander. hdl:2027/umn.31951002094003h.
- Nolan, Michael (1805). "Of the Year's Service". A Treatise of the Laws for the Relief and Settlement of the Poor. Vol. 1. London: A. Strahan. pp. 214–215. hdl:2027/ien.35556003815461.
- Paterson, James (1877). "Protection of the Body against Want and Destitution". Commentaries on the Liberty of the Subject and the Laws of England relating to the Security of the Person. Vol. 2. London: Macmillan & Co. hdl:2027/hvd.32044090361494.
- Robson, Ruthann (2013). "Beyond Sumptuary: Constitutionalism, Clothes, and Bodies in Anglo-American Law, 1215–1789". British Journal of American Legal Studies. 2 (2): 477–509 – via HeinOnline.
- Ruggles, Thomas (1793). The History of the Poor; their Rights, Duties, and the Laws Respecting them: In a Series of Letters. Vol. 1. London: J. Deighton. hdl:2027/mdp.39015068047839.
- Townsend, Joseph (1817) [First published 1786]. A Dissertation on the Poor Laws. London: Ridgways. hdl:2027/njp.32101058836162.
