= Poor Act 1712 =

Act of the Parliament of Great Britain

- Act of Parliament
- Parliament of Great Britain
- Long title: An Act for making perpetual the Act made in the Thirteenth and Fourteenth Years of the Reign of the late King Charles the Second, intituled, "An Act for the better Relief of the Poor of this Kingdom"; and that Persons bound Apprentices to, or being hired Servants with, Persons coming with Certificates, shall not gain Settlements by such Services or Apprenticeships; and for making perpetual the Act made in the Sixth Year of Her present Majesty's Reign, intituled, "An Act for the Importation of Cochineal, from any Ports in Spain during the present War, and Six Months longer"; and for reviving a Clause in an Act, made in the Ninth and Tenth Years of the Reign of the late King William, intituled, "An Act for settling the Trade to Africa", for allowing Foreign Copper Bars imported to be exported.
- Citation: 12 Ann. c. 18 (Note: This is the citation in The Statutes of the Realm.); 12 Ann. St. 1. c. 18 (Note: This is the citation in The Statutes at Large.)
- Territorial extent: Great Britain

Dates
- Royal assent: 16 July 1713
- Commencement: 9 April 1713 (Note: Start of session.)
- Repealed: 15 July 1867
Other legislation
Amends	See § Revived and continued enactments
Repealed by	Statute Law Revision Act 1867
Relates to	See Expiring laws continuance acts

Status: Repealed

Text of statute as originally enacted

The Poor Act 1712 (12 Ann. c. 18) was an act of the Parliament of Great Britain that made perpetual, revived and continued various older acts.

Section 2 of the act was significant in that it ensured that yearly servants and legal apprentices hired to a certificate holder could not gain a legal settlement through their service in the certificate-receiving parish, thereby protecting that specific parish to which the certificate was addressed from possible additional poor relief obligations.

== Background ==
In the United Kingdom, acts of Parliament remain in force until expressly repealed. Many acts of parliament, however, contained time-limited sunset clauses, requiring legislation to revive enactments that had expired or to continue enactments that would otherwise expire.

== Provisions ==
=== Revived and continued enactments ===
Section 1 of the act made the Poor Relief Act 1662 (14 Chas. 2. c. 12) perpetual, as continued by section 2 of the Administration of Intestates' Estate Act 1685 (1 Jas. 2. c. 17), as revived by section 1 of the Poor Relief Act 1691 (3 Will. & Mar. c. 11), as continued by section 10 of the Estreats (Personal Representatives) Act 1692 (4 Will. & Mar. c. 24), as continued by section 1 of the Exportation (No. 2) Act 1698 (11 Will. 3. c. 13) and as continued by section 1 of the Continuance of Laws Act 1706 (6 Ann. c. 24), except "what related to the Corporations therein mentioned and thereby constituted".

Section 2 of the act extended section 1 of the Relief of the Poor Act 1696 (8 & 9 Will. 3. c. 30), providing that persons who had moved to parishes under settlement certificates could not establish derivative settlements for their apprentices or servants, clarifying that after 24 June 1713, no apprentice bound by indenture or hired servant who came into a parish through someone else's settlement certificate would gain settlement rights in that parish through their apprenticeship or service, preventing certificate holders from creating additional settlement burdens on parishes.

Section 3 of the act made the Importation Act 1707 (6 Ann. c. 60) perpetual.

Section 4 of the act revived and continued section 9 of the Trade with Africa Act 1697 (9 Will. 3. c. 26) until the end of the next session of parliament after 14 years from the expiration of that enactments.

Section 5 of the act provided that drawback on copper would be allowed on imports from the East Indies and the coast of Barbary.

== Cases under the act ==
The act was interpreted in R. v. Soverby (2 East, 276), where the courts addressed questions of whether family members of certificated individuals could continue residing in the parish under the same settlement rights.

== Subsequent developments ==
Section 5 of the act was continued until the end of the next session of parliament after 14 years from the expiration of that enactment by section 1 of the Continuance of Laws, etc. Act 1726 (13 Geo. 1. c. 27).

Section 5 of the act was continued until the end of the next session of parliament after 14 years from the expiration of that enactment by section 4 of the Making of Sail Cloth, etc. Act 1741 (15 Geo. 2. c. 35).

Section 5 of the act was continued from the expiration of that enactment until the end of the next session of parliament after 24 June 1758 by section 2 of the Continuance of Laws, etc. Act 1753 (26 Geo. 2. c. 32).

Section 5 of the act was continued from the expiration of that enactment until the end of the next session of parliament after 24 June 1766 by section 1 of the Continuance of Laws Act 1758 (32 Geo. 2. c. 23).

Section 5 of the act was continued from the expiration of that enactment until the end of the next session of parliament after 24 June 1774 by section 1 of the Continuance of Laws Act 1766 (6 Geo. 3. c. 44).

Section 5 of the act was continued from the expiration of that enactment until the end of the next session of parliament after 24 June 1781 by section 1 of the Continuance of Laws, etc. Act 1774 (14 Geo. 3. c. 86).

The Select Committee on Temporary Laws, Expired or Expiring, appointed in 1796, inspected and considered all temporary laws, observing irregularities in the construction of expiring laws continuance acts, making recommendations and emphasising the importance of the Committee for Expired and Expiring Laws.

The whole act was repealed by section 1 of, and the schedule to, the Statute Law Revision Act 1867 (30 & 31 Vict. c. 59), which came into force on 15 July 1867.
