= Navigation Acts =

Legislative act of England on the docking of foreign shipping

Parliament of England
- Long title: Acts for the encouraging and increasing of shipping and navigation.
- Territorial extent: Kingdom of England and the English colonies
- Enacted by: Parliament of England
- Enacted: 1651, 1660, 1663, 1673, 1696
- Repealed: 1849
- Status: Repealed

The Navigation Acts, or more broadly the Acts of Trade and Navigation, were a series of English laws that developed, promoted, and regulated English ships, shipping, trade, and commerce with other countries and with its own colonies. The laws also regulated England's fisheries and restricted foreign—including Scottish and Irish—participation in its colonial trade. The first such laws enacted in 1650 and 1651 under the Commonwealth of England under Oliver Cromwell.

With the Restoration in 1660, royal government passed the Navigation Act 1660, and then further developed and tightened by the Navigation Acts of 1663, 1673, and 1696. Upon this basis during the 18th century, the acts were modified by subsequent amendments, changes, and the addition of enforcement mechanisms and staff. A major change in the purpose of the acts began in the 1760s, with the aim of generating revenue, i.e., taxes, from the colonies, rather than solely regulating trade. Colonists in North America saw the change in royal policy as trampling their rights as Englishmen and resisted what they considered taxation without representation, and significant changes in the implementation of the acts themselves.

The acts generally prohibited the use of foreign ships, required the employment of English and colonial mariners for 75% of the crews, including East India Company ships. The acts prohibited colonies from exporting certain products to countries other than Britain and those countries' colonies, and mandated that imports be sourced only through Britain.

Overall, the acts formed the basis for English (and later) British overseas trade for nearly 200 years, but with the development and gradual acceptance of free trade, the acts were eventually repealed in 1849. The laws reflected the European economic theory of mercantilism which sought to keep all the benefits of trade inside their respective empires, and to minimize the loss of gold and silver, or profits, to foreigners through purchases and trade. The system would develop with the colonies supplying raw materials for British industry, and in exchange for this guaranteed market, the colonies would purchase manufactured goods from or through Britain.

The major impetus for the first Navigation Act was the ruinous deterioration of English trade in the aftermath of the Eighty Years' War, and the associated lifting of the Spanish embargoes on trade between the Spanish Empire and the Dutch Republic. The end of the embargoes in 1647 unleashed the full power of the Amsterdam Entrepôt and other Dutch competitive advantages in European and world trade. Within a few years, English merchants had practically been overwhelmed in the Baltic and North Sea trade, as well as trade with the Iberian Peninsula, the Mediterranean and the Levant. Even the trade with English colonies (partly still in the hands of the royalists, as the English Civil War was in its final stages and the Commonwealth of England had not yet imposed its authority throughout the English colonies - see English overseas possessions in the Wars of the Three Kingdoms) was "engrossed" by Dutch merchants. English direct trade was crowded out by a sudden influx of commodities from the Levant, Mediterranean and the Spanish and Portuguese empires, and the West Indies via the Dutch entrepôt, carried in Dutch ships and for Dutch account.

The obvious solution seemed to be to seal off the English markets to these unwanted imports. A precedent was the act the Greenland Company had obtained from Parliament in 1645 prohibiting the import of whale products into England, except in ships owned by that company. This principle was now generalized. In 1648 the Levant Company petitioned Parliament for the prohibition of imports of Turkish goods "...from Holland and other places but directly from the places of their growth." Baltic traders added their voices to this chorus. In 1650 the Standing Council for Trade and the Council of State of the Commonwealth prepared a general policy designed to impede the flow of Mediterranean and colonial commodities via Holland and Zeeland into England.

Following the 1696 act, the acts of Trade and Navigation were generally obeyed, except for the Molasses Act 1733, which led to extensive smuggling because no effective means of enforcement was provided until the 1760s. Stricter enforcement under the Sugar Act 1764 became one source of resentment among merchants in the American colonies towards Great Britain. This, in turn, helped push the American colonies to rebel in the late 18th century, even though the consensus view among modern economic historians and economists is that the "costs imposed on [American] colonists by the trade restrictions of the Navigation Acts were small."

== Historical precedents ==
Some principles of English mercantile legislation pre-date both the passage of the Navigation Act 1651 and the settlement of England's early foreign possessions. A 1381 Act passed under King Richard II provided "that, to increase the navy of England, no goods or merchandises shall be either exported or imported, but only in ships belonging to the King's subjects." The letters patent granted to the Cabots by Henry VII in 1498 stipulated that the commerce resulting from their discoveries must be with England (specifically Bristol). Henry VIII established a second principle by statute: that such a vessel must be English-built and a majority of the crew must be English-born. Legislation during the reign of Elizabeth I also dealt with these questions and resulted in a large increase in English merchant shipping. Soon after actual settlements had been made in America, these early requirements illustrate the English theory then held regarding the governmental control of maritime commerce.

With the establishment of overseas colonies a distinct colonial policy began to develop, and the principles embodied in the early Navigation and Trade Acts also had some more immediate precedents in the provisions of the charters granted to the London and Plymouth Company, in the various royal patents later bestowed by Charles I and Charles II, as well as in the early regulations concerning the tobacco trade, the first profitable colonial export. An Order in Council of 24 October 1621 prohibited the Colony of Virginia to export tobacco and other commodities to foreign countries.

The London Company lost its charter in 1624; the same year a proclamation, followed by Orders in Council, prohibited the use of foreign ships for the Virginia tobacco trade. These early companies held the monopoly on trade with their plantation; this meant that the commerce developed was to be England's. The Crown's purpose was to restrict to England the future commerce with America; it is well shown in the patent granted by Charles I to William Berkeley in 1639, by which the patentee was "to oblige the masters of vessels, freighted with productions of the colony, to give bond before their departure to bring same into England ... and to forbid all trade with foreign vessels, except upon necessity."

As early as 1641 some English merchants urged that these rules be embodied in an act of Parliament, and during the Long Parliament, movement began in that direction. The Ordinance for Free Trade with the plantations in New England was passed in November 1644. In 1645, both to conciliate the colonies and to encourage English shipping, the Long Parliament prohibited the shipment of whalebone, except in English-built ships; they later prohibited the importation of French wine, wool, and silk from France. More generally and significantly on 23 January 1647, they passed the Ordinance granting privileges for the encouragement of Adventurers to plantations in Virginia, Bermudas, Barbados, and other places of America; it enacted that for three years no export duty be levied on goods intended for the colonies, provided they were forwarded in English vessels. Adam Anderson noted that this law also included "security being given here, and certificates from thence, that the said goods be really exported thither, and for the only use of the said plantations". He concluded: "Hereby the foundation was laid for the navigation acts afterward, which may be justly termed the Commercial Palladium of Britain."

The English were well aware of their inferior competitive trading position. Three acts of the Rump Parliament in 1650 and 1651 are notable in the historical development of England's commercial and colonial programs. These include the first Commission of Trade to be established by an Act of Parliament on 1 August 1650, to advance and regulate the nation's trade. The instructions to the named commissioners included consideration of both domestic and foreign trade, the trading companies, manufacturers, free ports, customs, excise, statistics, coinage and exchange, and fisheries, but also the plantations and the best means of promoting their welfare and rendering them useful to England. This act's statesmanlike and comprehensive instructions were followed by the October act prohibiting trade with pro-royalist colonies and the first Navigation Act the following October. These acts formed the first definitive expression of England's commercial policy. They represent the first attempt to establish a legitimate control of commercial and colonial affairs, and the instructions indicate the beginnings of a policy which had the prosperity and wealth of England exclusively at heart.

The 1650 act prohibiting trade with royalist colonies was broader, however, because it provided that all foreign ships were prohibited from trading with any English plantations, without license, and it was made lawful to seize and make prizes of any ships violating the act. This Act, sometimes referred to as the Navigation Act 1650, was hastily passed as a war measure during the English Civil Wars, but it was followed by a more carefully conceived Navigation Act 1651 the following year.

== Navigation Act 1651 ==
Navigation Act 1651
- Act of Parliament
- Parliament of England
- Long title: An Act for increase of Shipping, and Encouragement of the Navigation of this Nation.
- Citation: List of ordinances and acts of the Parliament of England, 1642–1660#1651
- Territorial extent: England and Wales

Dates
- Commencement: 9 October 1651

Status: Revoked

Text of statute as originally enacted

The Navigation Act 1651, long titled An Act for increase of Shipping, and Encouragement of the Navigation of this Nation, was passed on 9 October 1651 by the Rump Parliament led by Oliver Cromwell. It authorized the Commonwealth to regulate England's international trade, as well as the trade with its colonies. It reinforced long-standing principles of national policy that English trade and fisheries should be carried in English vessels.

The act banned foreign ships from transporting goods from Asia, Africa or America to England or its colonies; only ships with an English owner, master and a majority English crew would be accepted. It allowed European ships to import their own products, but banned foreign ships from transporting goods to England from a third country elsewhere in the European sphere. The act also prohibited the import and export of salted fish in foreign ships, and penalized foreign ships carrying fish and wares between English posts. Breaking the terms of the act would result in the forfeiture of the ship and its cargo. These rules specifically targeted the Dutch, who controlled much of Europe's international trade and even much of England's coastal shipping. It excluded the Dutch from essentially all direct trade with England, as the Dutch economy was competitive with, not complementary to the English, and the two countries, therefore, exchanged few commodities. This Anglo-Dutch trade, however, constituted only a small fraction of total Dutch trade flows.

Passage of the act was a reaction to the failure of the English diplomatic mission (led by Oliver St John and Walter Strickland) to The Hague seeking a political union of the Commonwealth with the Republic of the Seven United Netherlands, after the States of Holland had made some cautious overtures to Cromwell to counter the monarchical aspirations of stadtholder William II of Orange. The stadtholder had suddenly died, however, and the States were now embarrassed by Cromwell taking the idea too seriously. The English proposed the joint conquest of all remaining Spanish and Portuguese possessions. England would take America and the Dutch would take Africa and Asia. But the Dutch had just ended their war with Spain and already taken over most Portuguese colonies in Asia, so they saw little advantage in this grandiose scheme and proposed a free trade agreement as an alternative to a full political union. This again was unacceptable to the English, who would be unable to compete on such a level playing field, and was seen by them as a deliberate affront. The act is often mentioned as a major cause of the First Anglo-Dutch War, and though there were others, it was only part of a larger English policy to engage in war after the negotiations had failed. The English naval victories in 1653 (the Battles of Portland, the Gabbard and Scheveningen) showed the supremacy of the Commonwealth navy in home waters. However, farther afield the Dutch predominated and were able to close down English commerce in the Baltic and the Mediterranean. Both countries held each other in a stifling embrace.

The Treaty of Westminster (1654) ended the impasse. The Dutch failed to have the act repealed or amended, but it seems to have had relatively little influence on their trade. The act offered England only limited solace. It could not limit the deterioration of England's overseas trading position, except in the cases where England herself was the principal consumer, such as the Canaries wine trade and the trade in Puglian olive oil. In the trade with America and the West Indies, the Dutch kept up a flourishing "smuggling" trade, thanks to the preference of English planters for Dutch import goods and the better deal the Dutch offered in the sugar trade. The Dutch colony of New Netherlands offered a loophole (through intercolonial trade) wide enough to drive a shipload of Virginian tobacco through.

== Post-Restoration Navigation Acts to 1696 ==
Like all laws of the Commonwealth period, the 1651 act was declared void on the Restoration of Charles II, having been passed by 'usurping powers'. Nonetheless, with benefits of the act widely recognized, Parliament soon passed new legislation which enlarged its scope. While the act of 1651 applied only to shipping, or the ocean carrying business, the 1660 act was the most important piece of commercial legislation as it related to shipbuilding, to navigation, to trade, and to the benefit of the merchant class. The 1660 act is generally considered to be the basis of the "Navigation Acts", which (with later amendments, additions and exceptions) remained in force for nearly two centuries. The navigation acts entitled colonial shipping and seamen to enjoy the full benefits of the otherwise exclusively English provisions. "English bottoms" included vessels built in English plantations, particularly in America. There were no restrictions put in the way of English colonists who might wish to build or trade in their own ships to foreign plantations or other European countries besides England, provided they did not violate the enumerated commodity clause. Some of the most important products of colonial America, including grain of all sorts and the fisheries of New England, were always non-enumerated commodities.

=== Navigation Act 1660 ===
Navigation Act 1660
- Act of Parliament
- Parliament of England
- Long title: An Act for the Encourageing and increasing of Shipping and Navigation.
- Citation: 12 Cha. 2. c. 18
- Territorial extent: England and Wales; English overseas possessions

Dates
- Royal assent: 13 September 1660
- Commencement: various, 1 December 1660 to 1 September 1661
- Repealed: 5 July 1825
Other legislation
Repeals/revokes	Navigation Act 1651
Amended by	Recruiting Act 1703; Repeal of Acts Concerning Importation (No. 2) Act 1822
Repealed by	Confirmation of Acts (No. 3) Act 1661; Customs Law Repeal Act 1825
Relates to	Trade Act 1775; Trade (No. 2) Act 1775

Status: Repealed

Text of statute as originally enacted

The Navigation Act 1660 (12 Cha. 2. c. 18), long-titled An Act for the Encouraging and increasing of Shipping and Navigation, was passed on 13 September by the Convention Parliament and confirmed by the Cavalier Parliament on 27 July 1661. The act broadened and strengthened restrictions under Cromwell's earlier act. Colonial imports and exports were now restricted to ships "as doe truly and without fraud belong onely to the people of England ... or are of the built of and belonging to" any of the English possessions. Additionally, ships' crews now had to be 75% English, rather than just a majority, and ship captains were required to post a bond to ensure compliance and could recoup the funds upon arrival. The penalty for non-compliance was the forfeiture of both the ship and its cargo. The act provides that violations of the navigation act were to be tried in "any court of record," but it also authorizes and strictly requires all commanders of ships of war to seize non-English ships and deliver them to the Court of Admiralty.

The act specified seven colonial products, known as "enumerated" commodities or items, that were to be shipped from the colonies only to England or other English colonies. These items were tropical or semi-tropical produce that could not be grown in the mother country, but were of higher economic value and used in English competitive manufacturing. The initial products included sugar, tobacco, cotton wool, indigo, ginger, fustic, or other dyeing woods. Previously only tobacco export had been restricted to England. Additional enumerated items would be included in subsequent navigation acts, for example the cocoa bean was added in 1672, after drinking chocolate became the fashion.

In a significant bow to English merchants and to the detriment of numerous foreign colonists, section two of the act declared that "no alien or person not born within the allegiance of our sovereign lord the King, his heirs and successors, or naturalized or made a free denizen, shall... exercise the trade or occupation of a merchant or factor in any of the said places" (i.e. lands, islands, plantations, or territories belonging to the King in Asia, Africa, or America), upon pain of forfeiting all goods and chattels.

Customs Act 1660
- Act of Parliament
- Parliament of England
- Long title: An Act to prevent Fraudes and Concealments of His Majestyes Customes and Subsidyes.
- Citation: 12 Cha. 2. c. 19
- Territorial extent: England and Wales

Dates
- Royal assent: 13 September 1660
- Commencement: 1 September 1660 (Note: Section 1.)
- Repealed: 5 July 1825
Other legislation
Amended by	Taxation (No. 5) Act 1706
Repealed by	Customs Law Repeal Act 1825
Relates to	Exportation Act 1660; Tobacco Planting and Sowing Act 1660; Confirmation of Acts Act 1661

Status: Repealed

Text of statute as originally enacted

Passage of the Navigation Act 1660 act was immediately followed by the Customs Act 1660 (12 Cha. 2. c. 19), which established how the customs duties would be collected by the government, as well as for subsidies (tunnage and poundage) for royal expenses. These acts of revenue, previously established under the Commonwealth, were similarly reauthorised with the restoration. The 1660 customs act was tightened by the Customs Act 1662 (14 Cha. 2. c. 11). It also emphatically defines "Englishmen" under the Navigation Acts: "Whereas it is required by the [Navigation Act 1660] that in sundry cases the Master and three-fourths of the Mariners are to be English, it is to be understood that any of His Majesty's Subjects of England, Ireland, and His Plantations are to be accounted English and no others."

Exportation Act 1660
- Act of Parliament
- Parliament of England
- Long title: An Act for prohibiting the Exportation of Wooll, Woolfells, Fullers Earth, or any kinde of Scouring Earth.
- Citation: 12 Cha. 2. c. 32
- Territorial extent: England and Wales

Dates
- Royal assent: 29 December 1660
- Commencement: 14 January 1660
- Repealed: 21 July 1856
Other legislation
Repealed by	Repeal of Obsolete Statutes Act 1856
Relates to	Customs Act 1660; Tobacco Planting and Sowing Act 1660; Confirmation of Acts (No. 3) Act 1661

Status: Repealed

Text of statute as originally enacted

Tobacco Planting and Sowing Act 1660
- Act of Parliament
- Parliament of England
- Long title: An Act for Prohibiting the Planting Setting or Sowing of Tobaccho in England and Ireland.
- Citation: 12 Cha. 2. c. 34
- Territorial extent: England and Wales

Dates
- Royal assent: 29 December 1660
- Commencement: 1 January 1661
- Repealed: 29 April 1910
Other legislation
Amended by	Administration of Intestates' Estate Act 1685; Estreats (Personal Representatives) Act 1692Statute Law Revision Act 1888
Repealed by	Finance (1909-10) Act 1910
Relates to	Confirmation of Acts (No. 3) Act 1661

Status: Repealed

Text of statute as originally enacted

Other acts relating to trade were passed in the same session of Parliament and reiterated previous acts. These include the Exportation Act 1660 (12 Cha. 2. c. 32), which bans the export of wool and wool-processing materials, and the Tobacco Planting and Sowing Act 1660 (12 Cha. 2. c. 34), which prohibits growing tobacco in England and Ireland. The former act was intended to encourage domestic woolen manufacturing by increasing the availability of domestic raw materials; the latter act was passed to limit competition with the colonies and protect the plantations' main crop, as well as to protect this regulated royal revenue stream. With the kingdoms of England and Scotland still separate, passage of the English act lead to the passage of a similar navigation act by the Parliament of Scotland. After the Act of Union 1707, Scottish ships, merchants, and mariners enjoyed the same privileges.

=== Navigation Act 1663 ===
Encouragement of Trade Act 1663
- Act of Parliament
- Parliament of England
- Long title: An Act for the Encouragement of Trade.
- Citation: 15 Cha. 2. c. 7
- Territorial extent: England and Wales

Dates
- Royal assent: 27 July 1663
- Commencement: 1 September 1663 (Note: Start of session.)
- Repealed: 29 April 1910
Other legislation
Amended by	Statute Law Revision Act 1888
Repealed by	Finance (1909-10) Act 1910
Relates to	Importation Act 1666

Status: Repealed

Text of statute as originally enacted

The Navigation Act 1663 (15 Cha. 2. c. 7), long-titled An Act for the Encouragement of Trade, also termed the Encouragement of Trade Act 1663 or the Staple Act, was passed on 27 July. This strengthening of the navigation system now required all European goods, bound for America and other colonies, had to be trans-shipped through England first. In England, the goods would be unloaded, inspected, approved, duties paid, and finally, reloaded for the destination. This trade had to be carried in English vessels ("bottoms") or those of its colonies. Furthermore, imports of the 'enumerated' commodities (such as tobacco and cotton) had to be landed and taxes paid before continuing to other countries. "England", as used here, includes Wales and Berwick-upon-Tweed, though those places were little involved in colonial trade. The mercantile purpose of the act was to make England the staple for all European products bound for the colonies, and to prevent the colonies from establishing an independent import trade. This mandated change increased shipping times and costs, which in turn, increased the prices paid by the colonists. Due to these increases, some exemptions were allowed; these included salt intended for the New England and Newfoundland fisheries, wine from Madeira and the Azores, and provisions, servants and horses from Scotland and Ireland.

The most important new legislation embedded in the act, as seen from the perspective of the interests behind the East India Company, was the repeal of legislation which prohibited export of coin and bullion from England overseas. This export was the real issue behind the act, as silver was the main export article by the East India Company into India, exchanging the silver into cheap Indian gold. This change had major implications for the East India Company, for England and for India. The majority of silver in England was exported to India, creating enormous profits for the individual participants, but depriving the Crown of England of necessary silver and taxation. Much of the silver exported was procured by English piracy directed against Spanish and Portuguese merchant ships bringing silver from their colonies in the Americas to Europe. It was later revealed that the act passed Parliament due to enormous bribes paid by the East Indian Company to various influential members of Parliament.

Tobacco Planting and Plantation Trade Act 1670
- Act of Parliament
- Parliament of England
- Long title: An Act to prevent the planting of Tobacco in England, and for regulateing the Plantation Trade.
- Citation: 22 & 23 Cha. 2. c. 26
- Territorial extent: England and Wales

Dates
- Royal assent: 22 April 1671
- Commencement: 1 May 1671 (Note: Section 1.)
- Repealed: 23 May 1950
Other legislation
Repealed by	Customs Law Repeal Act 1825Statute Law Revision Act 1950

Status: Repealed

Text of statute as originally enacted

An act tightening colonial trade legislation, and sometimes referred to as the Navigation Act 1670, is the Tobacco Planting and Plantation Trade Act 1670 (22 & 23 Cha. 2. c. 26). This act imposes forfeiture penalties of the ship and cargo if enumerated commodities are shipped without a bond or customs certificate, or if shipped to countries other than England, or if ships unload sugar or enumerated products in any port except in England. The act requires the governors of American plantations to report annually to customs in London a list of all ships loading any commodities there, as well as a list of all bonds taken. The act states that prosecutions for a breach of the navigation acts should be tried in the court of the high admiral of England, in any of the vice-admiralty courts, or in any court of record in England, but while the act again hints at the jurisdiction of the admiralty courts, it does not explicitly provide for them. In a move against Ireland, the act additionally repealed the ability of Ireland (in the 1660 act) to obtain the necessary bond for products shipped to overseas colonies.

The specifically anti-Dutch aspects of the early acts were in full force for a relatively short time. During the Second Anglo-Dutch War the English had to abandon the Baltic trade and allowed foreign ships to enter the coasting and plantation trade. Following the war, which ended disastrously for England, the Dutch obtained the right to ship commodities produced in their German hinterland to England as if these were Dutch goods. Even more importantly, as England accepted the concept of neutrality, it conceded the principle of "free ships make free goods" which provided freedom from molestation by the Royal Navy of Dutch shipping on the high seas during wars in which the Dutch Republic was neutral. This more or less gave the Dutch freedom to conduct their "smuggling" unhindered as long as they were not caught red-handed in territorial waters controlled by England. These provisions were reconfirmed in the Treaty of Westminster (1674) after the Third Anglo-Dutch War.

=== Navigation Act 1673 ===
Trade Act 1672
- Act of Parliament
- Parliament of England
- Long title: An Act for the incouragement of the Greeneland and Eastland Trades, and for the better secureing the Plantation Trade.
- Citation: 25 Cha. 2. c. 7
- Territorial extent: England and Wales

Dates
- Royal assent: 29 March 1673
- Commencement: 4 February 1673
- Repealed: 28 July 1863
Other legislation
Amended by	Taxation (No. 5) Act 1706; Trade Act (No. 2) 1822
Repealed by	Statute Law Revision Act 1863
Relates to	Commissioners of Customs Act 1767

Status: Repealed

Text of statute as originally enacted

The so-called Navigation Act 1673 (25 Cha. 2. c. 7), long-titled An Act for the incouragement of the Greeneland and Eastland Trades, and for the better secureing the Plantation Trade became enforceable at various dates in that year; the act is short titled the Trade Act 1672. The act was intended to increase English capability and production in the northern whale fishery (more accurately in Spitsbergen), as well as in the eastern Baltic and North Sea trade, where the Dutch and Hansa dominated commerce and trade. The act also closed a significant loophole in the enumerated goods trade as a result of the active inter-colonial trade.

To promote whaling and production of its oil and whalebone etc., the act relaxed the 1660 act's restrictions on foreigners, allowing up to half the crew, if on English ships, and dropped all duties on these products for the next ten years. It also allowed foreign residents and foreigners to participate in this trade if imported to England in English ships. Colonial ships and crews engaged in this trade had to pay a low duty, with foreign ships paying a high duty. To promote the eastern trade then monopolized by the chartered and poorly performing Eastland Company, the act opened their trade with Sweden, Denmark, and Norway to foreigners and English alike. It also allowed any Englishman to be admitted into the Eastland Company on paying a minor fee. The act was a mortal blow to Eastland's royal charter.

To better secure their own plantation trade from considerable illegal indirect trade in enumerated products to Europe, by way of legal inter-colonial trade, the act instituted that customs duties and charges should be paid on departure from the colonies, if traveling without first obtaining the bond required to carry the goods to England. The purpose of the act was to stop the carrying of plantation goods to another plantation with their subsequent shipment to a foreign country on the grounds that the 1660 act's requirements had been fulfilled. This change was a considerable advance toward the systematic execution of the previous acts, and increased much needed royal revenue given the recent Stop of the Exchequer. To better collect the customs revenue the act established that these were now to be levied and collected by the Commissioners of Customs in England. Also, if a ship arrived with insufficient funds to pay the duties, customs official could accept an equivalent proportion of the goods as payment instead.

=== Navigation Act 1696 ===
Plantation Trade Act 1695
- Act of Parliament
- Parliament of England
- Long title: An Act for preventing Frauds and regulating Abuses in the Plantation Trade
- Citation: 7 & 8 Will. 3. c. 22
- Territorial extent: England and Wales

Dates
- Royal assent: 10 April 1696
- Commencement: 25 March 1698 (Note: Section 1.)
- Repealed: 15 July 1867
Other legislation
Amended by	Customs Law Repeal Act 1825
Repealed by	Statute Law Revision Act 1867

Status: Repealed

Text of statute as originally enacted

The so-called Navigation Act 1696 (7 & 8 Will. 3. c. 22), long-titled An Act for preventing Frauds and regulating Abuses in the Plantation Trade, became effective over in the next few years, due to its far reaching provisions; the act is short-titled the Plantation Trade Act 1695. It contains new restrictions on colonial trade, and several different administrative provisions to strengthen enforcement and consolidate the earlier acts.

In tightening the wording of the 1660 act, and after noting the daily "great abuses [being] committed ... by the artifice and cunning of ill disposed persons", this act now required that no goods or merchandise could be imported, exported, or carried between English possessions in Africa, Asia and America, or shipped to England, Wales, or Berwick upon Tweed, except in "what is or shall bee [be] of the Built of England or of the Built of Ireland or the said Colonies or Plantations and wholly owned by the People thereof ... and navigated with the Masters and Three-Fourths of the Mariners of the said Places onely". To enforce this change, the act required the registration of all ships and owners, including an oath that they will not have foreign owners before the ship would be considered English-built. Exceptions were introduced for foreign-built ships taken as prize, or those employed by the navy for importing naval stores from the plantations. The deadline for the registration of ships was extended by the Registering of Ships Act 1697 (9 Will. 3. c. 42) In a significant tightening of the navigation enforcement system, section 6 of the act establishes that violations are to be tried in any of His Majesties Courts att Westminster or [in the Kingdome of Ireland or in the Court of Admiralty held in His Majesties Plantations respectively where such Offence shall bee committed att the Pleasure of the Officer or Informer or in any other Plantation belonging to any Subject of England]... Revenue generated was to be split in thirds between the King, the Governor, and the one who informed and sued.

Previously, most of the customs collection and enforcement in the colonies was performed by the governor or his appointees, commonly known as the "naval officer," but evasion, corruption and indifference were common. The 1696 act now required all current governors and officers to take an oath that all and every clause contained in the act be "punctually and bona fide observed according to the true intent and meaning". Governors nominated in the future were required to take this oath before assuming office. To tighten compliance among colonial customs officials, the act required that all current and future officers give a security bond to the Commissioners of the Customs in England to undertake the "true and faithful performance of their duty". Additionally, the act gave colonial customs officers the same power and authority as of customs officers in England; these included the ability to board and search ships and warehouses, load and unload cargoes, and seize those imported or exported goods prohibited or those for which duties should have been paid under the acts. Commissioners of the treasury and of the customs in England would now appoint the colonial customs officials. Due to colonial "doubts or misconstructions" concerning the bond required under the 1660 act, the 1696 act now mandated that no enumerated goods could be loaded or shipped until the required bond was obtained. The act was followed by a special instruction about the oaths and proprietary governors who weren't directly under royal control to post a bond to comply; this was considered by the Board of Trade and issued on 26 May 1697.

Since the colonies previously had passed much of their own legislation and appointments, the act included several sections to tighten English control over the colonies generally. The act mandated that all colonial positions of trust in the courts or related to the treasury must be native born subjects of England, Ireland or the colonies. It also enacted that all laws, bylaws, usages or customs in current or future use in the plantations, which are found to be repugnant to the navigation acts in any way, are to be declared illegal, null and void. The act additionally declared that all persons or their heirs claiming any right or property "in any Islands or Tracts of Land upon the Continent of America by Charter or Letters Patent shall not in the future alienate, sell or dispose of any of the Islands, Tracts of Land, or Proprieties other than to the Natural Born Subjects of England, Ireland, Dominion of Wales or Town of Berwick upon Tweed without the License and Consent of His Majesty". Colonial-born subjects were not mentioned. Such a sale must be signified by a prior Order in Council.

With this act the government did start to institute admiralty courts and staff them in more and new places; this established "a more general obedience to the acts of Trade and Navigation." John Reeves, who wrote the handbook for the Board of Trade, considered the 1696 act to be the last major navigation act, with relatively minor subsequent acts. The system established by this act, and upon previous acts, was where the Navigation Acts still stood in 1792, though there would be major policy changes followed by their reversals in the intervening years.

== Navigation Acts 1696–1760 ==
=== Molasses Act 1733 ===
The Molasses Act 1733 (6 Geo. 2. c. 13) levied heavy duties on the trade of sugar from the French West Indies to the American colonies, forcing the colonists to buy the more expensive sugar from the British West Indies instead. The law was widely flouted, but efforts by the British to prevent smuggling created hostility and contributed to the American Revolution. The Molasses Act was the first of the Sugar Acts. The act was set to expire in 1763, but in 1764 it was renewed as the Sugar Act 1764 (4 Geo. 3. c. 15), which caused further unrest among the colonists.

== Repeal ==
Navigation Act 1849
- Act of Parliament
- Parliament of the United Kingdom
- Long title: An Act to amend the Laws in force for the Encouragement of British Shipping and Navigation.
- Citation: 12 & 13 Vict. c. 29
- Territorial extent: United Kingdom

Dates
- Royal assent: 26 June 1849
- Commencement: 1 January 1850 (Note: Section 22.)
- Repealed: 1 May 1855
Other legislation
Amends	Importation, etc., in Foreign Vessels Act 1823; Lascars Act 1823; Duties on Corn Act 1842; Merchant Seamen Act 1844; Customs (No. 3) Act 1845; Registering of British Vessels Act 1845; Trade of British Possessions Act 1845; Duties of Customs Act 1845; Customs Consolidation Act 1853
Repeals/revokes	Trade with India Act 1797; Duties on Foreign Vessels Act 1824; Shipping, etc. Act 1845
Repealed by	Merchant Shipping Repeal Act 1854

Status: Repealed

Text of statute as originally enacted

The Navigation Acts were repealed in 1849 under the influence of a free trade philosophy. The Navigation Acts were passed under the economic theory of mercantilism, under which wealth was to be increased by restricting colonial trade to the mother country rather than through free trade. By 1849 "a central part of British import strategy was to reduce the cost of food through cheap foreign imports and in this way to reduce the cost of maintaining labour power" (van Houten). Repealing the Navigation Acts along with the Corn Laws eventually served this purpose (towards the end of the century).

== Effects on Britain ==
The acts caused Britain's (before 1707, England's) shipping industry to develop in isolation. However, it had the advantage to British shippers of severely limiting the ability of Dutch ships to participate in the carrying trade to Britain. By reserving British colonial trade to British shipping, the acts may have significantly assisted in the growth of London as a major entry port for American colonial wares at the expense of Dutch cities. The maintenance of a certain level of merchant shipping and of trade generally also facilitated a rapid increase in the size and quality of the Royal Navy, which eventually (after the Anglo-Dutch Alliance of 1689 limited the Dutch navy to three-fifths of the size of the English one) led to Britain becoming a global superpower, which it remained until the mid-20th century. That naval might, however, never limited Dutch trading power – because the Dutch enjoyed enough leverage over overseas markets and shipping resources (combined with a financial power that was only overtaken by Britain during the 18th century) to enable them to put enough pressure on Britain to prevent them from sustaining naval campaigns long enough to wrest maritime concessions from the Dutch.

== Effects on American colonies ==
The Navigation Acts, while enriching Britain, caused resentment in the colonies and contributed to the American Revolution. The Navigation Acts required all of a colony's imports to be either bought from Britain or resold by British merchants in Britain, regardless of the price obtainable elsewhere. In the 1772 Gaspee affair, Rhode Island colonists attacked and burned a Royal Navy revenue schooner enforcing the Navigation Acts off the coast of Rhode Island.

Historian Robert Thomas (1965) argues that the impact of the acts on the economies of the Thirteen Colonies was minimal; the cost was about £4 per £1,000 of income per year. The average personal income was about £100 per year. However, Ransom (1968) says that although the net burden imposed by the acts was small in size, their overall impact on the shape and growth rate of the economy was significant since the acts differentially affected different groups, helping some and hurting others.

Walton concludes that the political friction caused by the acts was more serious than the negative economic impact, especially since the merchants most affected were politically the most active. The Navigation Acts were also partially responsible for an increase in piracy during the late 17th and early 18th centuries: merchants and colonial officials would buy goods captured by pirates below market value, and colonial governors such as New York's Benjamin Fletcher would commission privateers who openly admitted they intended to turn pirate.

Sawers (1992) points out that the political issue is what would have been the future impact of the acts after 1776 as the colonial economy matured and was blocked by the acts from serious competition with British manufacturers. In 1995, a random survey of 178 members of the Economic History Association found that 89 percent of economists and historians would generally agree that the "costs imposed on [American] colonists by the trade restrictions of the Navigation Acts were small."

Rutkow (2012) notes that timber was not one of the "enumerated commodities" included in the acts, and so New Englanders could continue the wine islands commerce in timber that began around 1642 without upsetting England. By the 1660s, the wine islands region, namely Madeira, was the dominant trading partner in timber with the New England colonies.

== Effect on Ireland ==
The acts were resented in Ireland and damaged its economy, as they permitted the importation of English goods into Ireland tariff-free and simultaneously imposed tariffs on Irish exports travelling in the opposite direction. Other clauses completely prohibited the exportation of certain goods to Britain or even elsewhere, resulting in the collapse of those markets. The Wool Act 1699, for example, forbade any exports of wool from Ireland (and from the American colonies) so as to maximise the English trade.

"Free trade or a Speedy Revolution" was a slogan of the Irish Volunteers in the late 18th century.

== See also ==
- Mercantilism
- Merchant Marine Act of 1920

== Bibliography ==
- Anderson, Adam (1787). An historical and chronological deduction of the origin of commerce: from the earliest accounts. Vol. 2. J. Walker.
- Beer, George Louis (1893). The Commercial Policy of England toward the American Colonies. New York: Columbia College.
- Clapham, J. H. (1910). "The last years of the Navigation Acts". English Historical Review. 25 (99): 480–501. doi:10.1093/ehr/xxv.xcix.480. JSTOR 549885.
- Craven, Wesley Frank (1968). The Colonies in Transition. New York, Harper & Row. On North America
- Dickerson, Oliver Morton (1951). The Navigation Acts and the American Revolution.
- Egerton, Hugh Edward (1897). A Short History of British Colonial Policy. London: London, Methuen & co.
- Harper, Lawrence Averell (1939). The English Navigation Laws: A Seventeenth-Century Experiment in Social Engineering.
- Harper, Lawrence Averell (1959). The Effect of the Navigation Acts on the Thirteen Colonies.
- Israel, J. I. (1997). "England's Mercantilist Response to Dutch World Trade Primacy, 1647–74". Conflicts of Empires. Spain, the Low Countries and the struggle for world supremacy 1585–1713. Hambledon Press. pp. 305–318. ISBN 978-1-85285-161-3.
- Loschky, David J. (1973). "Studies of the Navigation Acts: New Economic Non-History?". Economic History Review. 26 (4): 689–691. doi:10.2307/2593707. JSTOR 2593707.
- Osgood, Herbert L. (1907). The American Colonies in the Seventeenth Century, Vol. 3. New York: The Macmillan company.
- Ransom, Roger L. (1968). "British Policy and Colonial Growth: Some Implications of the Burden from the Navigation Acts". Journal of Economic History. 28 (3): 427–35. doi:10.1017/S0022050700073149. JSTOR 2116467. S2CID 153948157.
- Reeves, John (1792). A History of the Law of Shipping and Navigation2. Great Britain: Thomas Burnside.
- Rutkow, Eric (2012). American Canopy: Trees, Forests, and the Making of a Nation. New York: Scribner. p. 24. ISBN 978-1-4391-9354-9.
- Sawers, Larry (1992). "The Navigation Acts revisited". Economic History Review. 45 (2): 262–284. doi:10.1111/j.1468-0289.1992.tb01301.x.
- Thomas, Robert P. (1965). "A Quantitative Approach to the Study of the Effects of British Imperial Policy of Colonial Welfare: Some Preliminary Findings". Journal of Economic History. 25 (4): 615–638. doi:10.1017/S0022050700058460. JSTOR 2116133. S2CID 153513278.
- Walton, Gary M. (1971). "The New Economic History and the Burdens of the Navigation Acts". Economic History Review. 24 (4): 533–542. doi:10.1111/j.1468-0289.1971.tb00192.x.
- Williams, James (1911). "Navigation Laws" . In Chisholm, Hugh (ed.). Encyclopædia Britannica. Vol. 19 (11th ed.). Cambridge University Press. pp. 298–299.
