= Continuance of Laws Act 1706 =

Act of the Parliament of England

- Act of Parliament
- Parliament of England
- Long title: An Act for continuing the Laws therein mentioned, relating to the Poor, and to the buying and selling of Cattle in Smithfield; and for suppressing of Piracy.
- Citation: 6 Ann. c. 34 (Note: This is the citation in The Statutes of the Realm.); 5 Ann. c. 34 (Note: This is the citation in The Statutes at Large.)
- Territorial extent: England and Wales

Dates
- Royal assent: 8 April 1707
- Commencement: 3 December 1706 (Note: Start of session.)
- Repealed: 15 July 1867

Other legislation
- Amends: See § Continued enactments
- Repealed by: Statute Law Revision Act 1867
- Relates to: See Expiring laws continuance acts

Status: Repealed

Text of statute as originally enacted

The Continuance of Laws Act 1706 (6 Ann. c. 34) (Note: This is the citation in The Statutes of the Realm.) was an act of the Parliament of England that continued various older acts.

== Background ==
In the United Kingdom, acts of Parliament remain in force until expressly repealed. Many acts of parliament, however, contained time-limited sunset clauses, requiring legislation to revive enactments that had expired or to continue enactments that would otherwise expire.

== Provisions ==
=== Continued enactments ===
Section 1 of the act continued the Poor Relief Act 1662 (14 Chas. 2. c. 12) (Note: This is the citation in The Statutes of the Realm.), as continued by section 2 of the Administration of Intestates' Estate Act 1685 (1 Jas. 1. c. 17), section 1 of the Poor Relief Act 1691 (3 Will. & Mar. c. 11), section 8 of the Estreats (Personal Representatives) Act 1692 (4 Will. & Mar. c. 24) and section 5 of the Exportation (No. 2) Act 1698 (11 Will. 3. c. 13), until the end of the next session of parliament after 7 years from 25 March 1707, except what relates to the Corporations therein mentioned mentioned and thereby constituted.

Section 2 of the act continued the Sale of Cattle Act 1670 (22 & 23 Cha. 2. c. 19), as continued by section 10 of the Administration of Intestates' Estate Act 1685 (1 Jas. 1. c. 17), section 5 of the Estreats (Personal Representatives) Act 1692 (4 Will. & Mar. c. 24) and section 5 of the Exportation (No. 2) Act 1698 (11 Will. 3. c. 13), until the end of the next session of parliament after 7 years from 25 March 1707, except the clause repealed by the Sale of Cattle Act 1672 (25 Cha. 2. c. 4).

Section 3 of the act provided that from 29 September 1707, no butcher should sell or offer to sell fat cattle or sheep to other butchers within London, Westminster, or within ten miles thereof, as this practice was deemed pernicious for reducing the number of buyers in Smithfield market, subjecting both graziers and housekeepers to arbitrary pricing, with violators to forfeit the value of the cattle or sheep sold, one moiety to the Queen and the other to whoever would sue for it in the courts.

Section 4 of the act continued the Piracy Act 1698 (11 Will. 3. c. 7) (Note: This is the citation in The Statutes of the Realm.) until the end of the next session of parliament from after 7 years from the expiration of the act.

Section 5 of the act that upon recovery of any penalty or forfeiture imposed by the act, full costs would be allowed to the plaintiff.

== Subsequent developments ==
The Select Committee on Temporary Laws, Expired or Expiring, appointed in 1796, inspected and considered all temporary laws, observing irregularities in the construction of expiring laws continuance acts, making recommendations and emphasising the importance of the Committee for Expired and Expiring Laws.

The whole act was repealed by section 1 of, and the schedule to, the Statute Law Revision Act 1867 (30 & 31 Vict. c. 59), which came into force on 15 July 1867.
