= Administration of Intestates' Estate Act 1685 =

Act of the Parliament of England

- Act of Parliament
- Parliament of England
- Long title: An Act for Reviveing and Continuance of severall Acts of Parlyament therein mentioned.
- Citation: 1 Ja. 2. c. 17
- Territorial extent: England and Wales; Ireland

Dates
- Royal assent: 2 July 1685
- Commencement: 19 May 1685 (Note: Start of session.)
- Repealed: England and Wales: 1 January 1926; Northern Ireland: 18 December 1953
Other legislation
Amends	See § Revived and continued enactments
Amended by	Law of Property (Amendment) Act 1924
Repealed by	England and Wales: Administration of Estates Act 1925; Northern Ireland: Statute Law Revision Act 1953
Relates to	Continuance of Laws Act 1678; Estreats (Personal Representatives) Act 1692; Exportation (No. 2) Act 1698; Continuance of Laws Act 1706; Poor Act 1712

Status: Repealed

Text of statute as originally enacted

The Administration of Intestates' Estate Act 1685 (1 Ja. 2. c. 17) was an act of the Parliament of England that revived and continued various acts from the reign of King Charles II.

== Background ==
In the United Kingdom, acts of Parliament remain in force until expressly repealed. Many acts of parliament, however, contained time-limited sunset clauses, requiring legislation to revive enactments that had expired or to continue enactments that would otherwise expire.

== Provisions ==
=== Revived and continued enactments ===
Section 2 of the act revived the Poor Relief Act 1662 (13 & 14 Cha. 2. c. 12) and continued it until the end of the next session of parliament after 7 years from the start of the present session of parliament, except "what relates unto the Corporation therein mentioned and Constituted thereby".

Section 3 of the act provided that the settlement of poor intended by the Poor Relief Act 1662 (13 & 14 Cha. 2. c. 12) would be accounted from a delivery of notice in writing to the churchwarden or overseer of the poor.

Section 4 of the act made the Expenses of Sheriffs Act 1662 (13 & 14 Cha. 2. c. 21) perpetual.

Section 5 of the act made the Death between Verdict and Judgment Act 1665 (17 Cha. 2. c. 8), and the Statute of Distribution (22 & 23 Cha. 2. c. 10) as amended by section 29 of the Statute of Frauds (29 Cha. 2. c. 3), both continued by the Continuance of Laws Act 1678 (30 Cha. 2. c. 6), perpetual.

Section 6 of the act provided that from 24 July 1865, administrators would not be required to create an account of the estate, except by an inventory, unless compelled by interested parties.

Section 7 of the act provided that the brother and sister of an intestate would share equally with the mother.

Section 8 of the act clarified that the provisions in the Statute of Distribution (22 & 23 Cha. 2. c. 10) for customs of London and York would not extend to an intestate's estate claimed by an administrator in his legal capacity as an administrator ("Administrator quatenus Administrator").

Section 9 of the act continued the Exchequer Orders Act 1667 (19 & 20 Cha. 2. c. 4) until the end of the next session of parliament after 7 years from the start of the present session of parliament.

Section 10 of the act continued the Sale of Cattle Act 1670 (22 & 23 Cha. 2. c. 19) until the end of the next session of parliament after 7 years from 24 June 1685, but provided that anything "contained shall not extend to Salemen or Factors imployed by Farmers or Feeders".

Section 11 of the act continued the Fines and Forfeitures Act 1670 (22 & 23 Cha. 2. c. 22) until the end of the next session of parliament after 7 years from the start of the present session of parliament.

Section 12 of the act continued the Navy Act 1670 (22 & 23 Cha. 2. c. 23) until the end of the next session of parliament after 7 years from the start of the present session of parliament.

Section 13 of the act continued the Tobacco Planting and Plantation Trade Act 1670 (22 & 23 Cha. 2. c. 26) until the end of the next session of parliament after 7 years from the start of the present session of parliament.

Section 14 of the act continued the Executors of Executors (Waste) Act 1678 (30 Cha. 2. c. 7) until the end of the next session of parliament after 7 years from the start of the present session of parliament.

Section 15 of the act revived and continued the Licensing of the Press Act 1662 (13 & 14 Cha. 2. c. 33) until the end of the next session of parliament after 7 years from 24 June 1685 (14 March 1693).

== Subsequent developments ==
Several acts continued by the act were further continued by the Estreats (Personal Representatives) Act 1692 (4 Will. & Mar. c. 24).

The Select Committee on Temporary Laws, Expired or Expiring, appointed in 1796, inspected and considered all temporary laws, observing irregularities in the construction of expiring laws continuance acts, making recommendations and emphasising the importance of the Committee for Expired and Expiring Laws.

Sections 2–5 and 8 to the end of the act were repealed by section 1 of, and the schedule to, the Statute Law Revision Act 1863 (26 & 27 Vict. c. 125), which came into force on 28 July 1863.

Sections 5 and 7 of the act were repealed by section 1 of, and the first schedule to, Law of Property (Amendment) Act 1924 (15 & 16 Geo. 5. c. 5).

The whole act was repealed for England and Wales by section 56 of, and part I of the second schedule to, the Administration of Estates Act 1925 (15 & 16 Geo. 5. c. 23), which came into force on 1 January 1926.

Section 13 of the act was repealed for Northern Ireland by section 1 of, and the first schedule to, the Statute Law Revision Act 1953 (2 & 3 Eliz. 2. c. 5), which came into force on 18 December 1953.
