= Poor Relief Act 1662 =

Act of the Parliament of England

Poor Relief Act 1662 (Note: The citation of this act by this short title was authorised by section 1 of, and the first schedule to, the Short Titles Act 1896. Due to the repeal of those provisions it is now authorised by section 19(2) of the Interpretation Act 1978.)
- Act of Parliament
- Parliament of England
- Long title: An Acte for the better Releife of the Poore of this Kingdom. (Note: These words are printed against this act in the second column of first schedule to the Short Titles Act 1896, which is headed "Title".)
- Citation: 14 Cha. 2. c. 12 (Note: This is the citation in The Statutes of the Realm.); 13 & 14 Cha. 2. c. 12 (Note: This is the citation in The Statutes at Large.)
- Territorial extent: England and Wales

Dates
- Royal assent: 19 May 1662
- Commencement: 7 January 1662 (Note: Start of session.)
- Repealed: 30 July 1948
Other legislation
Amends	Poor Law Amendment Act 1834
Amended by	Administration of Intestates' Estate Act 1685; Poor Relief Act 1691; Estreats (Personal Representatives) Act 1692; Exportation (No. 2) Act 1698; Continuance of Laws Act 1706; Poor Act 1712; Poor Removal Act 1795; Statute Law Revision Act 1863; Statute Law Revision Act 1887; Statute Law Revision Act 1888; Rating and Valuation Act 1925
Repealed by	Poor Law Act 1927Statute Law Revision Act 1948
Relates to	Relief of the Poor Act 1696

Status: Repealed

Text of statute as originally enacted

The Poor Relief Act 1662 (14 Cha. 2. c. 12) was an act of the Cavalier Parliament of England. It was an Act for the Better Relief of the Poor of this Kingdom and is also known as the Settlement Act or the Settlement and Removal Act.

== Purpose ==
The purpose of the act was to establish the parish to which a person belonged (i.e. his/her place of "settlement"), and hence clarify which parish was responsible for him should he become in need of poor relief (or "chargeable" to the parish poor rates). This was the first occasion when a document proving domicile became statutory: these were called "settlement certificates".

After 1662, if a man left his settled parish to move elsewhere, he had to take his settlement certificate, which guaranteed that his home parish would pay for his "removal" costs (from the host parish) back to his home if he needed poor relief. As parishes were often unwilling to issue such certificates, people often stayed where they were – knowing that, should they become indigent, they would be entitled to their parish's poor rate.

The act stipulated that if a poor person (that is, resident of a tenancy with a taxable value less than £10 per year, who did not fall under the other protected categories) remained in the parish for forty days of undisturbed residency, he could acquire "settlement rights" in that parish. However, within those forty days, upon any local complaint, two justices of the peace could remove the man and return him to his home parish. As a result, some parish officers dispatched their poor to other parishes, with instructions to remain hidden for forty days before revealing themselves. This loophole was closed with the Reviving and Continuance Act 1685 (1 Ja. 2. c. 17) which required new arrivals to register with parish authorities. But sympathetic parish officers often hid the registration, and did not reveal the presence of new arrivals until the required residency period was over. As a result, the law was further tightened in 1692 by the Poor Relief Act 1691 (3 Will. & Mar. c. 11), and parish officers were obliged to publicly publish arrival registrations in writing in the local church Sunday circular, and read to the congregation, and that the forty days would only start counting from thereon.

The settlement laws benefited the owners of large estates who controlled housing. Some land owners demolished empty housing in order to reduce the population of their lands and prevent people from returning. It was also common to recruit labourers from neighbouring parishes so that they could easily be sacked. Magistrates could order parishes to grant poor relief. However, often the magistrates were landowners and therefore unlikely to make relief orders that would increase poor rates.

== Appointment of constables by justices ==
Ordinarily, the common-law power to appoint constables for the parish by the lord of the manor at the court leet, but the act notes that this was sometimes not happening, and as a result that the Vagabonds Act 1597 (39 Eliz. 1. c. 4) and the Vagabonds Act 1603 (1 Jas. 1. c. 7) were not being properly enforced.

Section 15 of the act gave any two justices of the peace the power to appoint and swear constables in the absence of an appointment by the court leet. At the next quarter sessions, that court could then either confirm their appointment or appoint other constables in their place. In any event, they would serve only until a court leet was held.

== Subsequent developments ==
The act, was amended and continued until the end of the next session of parliament after 7 years from the start of the present session of parliament (Note: 19 May 1685) by section 2 of the Administration of Intestates' Estate Act 1685 (1 Ja. 2. c. 17), except "what relates unto the Corporation therein mentioned and Constituted thereby".

The act was revived from 1 March 1691 by section 1 of the Poor Relief Act 1691 (3 Will. & Mar. c. 11).

The act was continued until the end of the next session of parliament after 7 years from 13 February 1692 by section 10 of the Estreats (Personal Representatives) Act 1692 (4 Will. & Mar. c. 24).

The act was continued until the end of the next session of parliament after 7 years from 29 September 1700 by section 6 of the Exportation (No. 2) Act 1698 (11 Will. 3. c. 13) (Note: This is the citation in The Statutes of the Realm.).

The act was continued until the end of the next session of parliament after 7 years from 25 March 1707 by section 1 of the Continuance of Laws Act 1706 (6 Ann. c. 24) (Note: This is the citation in The Statutes of the Realm.).

The act, except "what related to the Corporations therein mentioned and thereby constituted", was made perpetual by section 1 of the Poor Act 1712 (12 Ann. c. 18) (Note: This is the citation in The Statutes of the Realm.).

The act was repealed in 1834 (under the terms of the Poor Law Amendment Act 1834 (4 & 5 Will. 4. c. 76), which introduced the union workhouses), although not fully. The concept of parish settlement has been characterised as "incompatible with the newly developing industrial system", because it hindered internal migration to factory towns.

Sections 4–14, 16, 17, 19, 23 and 25 of the act were repealed by section 1 of, and the schedule to, the Statute Law Revision Act 1863 (26 & 27 Vict. c. 125), which came into force on 28 July 1863..

The whole act, except sections 21, 22 and 24, were repealed by section 245 of, and the eleventh schedule to, Poor Law Act 1927 (17 & 18 Geo. 5. c. 14), which came into force on 1 October 1927.

The whole act, so far as unrepealed, was repealed by section 1 of, and the first schedule to, the Statute Law Revision Act 1948 (11 & 12 Geo. 6. c. 62), which came into force on 30 July 1948.

== Settlement terms ==
To gain settlement in a parish a person had to meet at least one of the following conditions:-

- Be born into the parish.
- Have lived in the parish for forty consecutive days without complaint.
- Be hired for over a year and a day that takes place within the parish – (this led to short lengths of hire so that settlement was not obtained).
- Hold an office in the parish.
- Rent a property worth £10 per year or pay the same in taxes.
- Have married into the parish.
- Gained poor relief in that parish previously.
- Have a seven-year apprenticeship with a settled resident.
