= Continuance of Laws Act 1678 =

Act of the Parliament of England

- Act of Parliament
- Parliament of England
- Long title: An Act for reviveing a former Act entituled "An Act for avoiding unnecessary Suits and Delayes" and for continuance of one, other Act entituled "An Act for the better settleing of Intestates Estates".
- Citation: 30 Cha. 2. c. 6
- Territorial extent: England and Wales

Dates
- Royal assent: 16 July 1678
- Commencement: 23 May 1678 (Note: Start of session.)
- Repealed: 28 July 1863
Other legislation
Amends	Death between Verdict and Judgment Act 1665; Statute of Distribution
Repealed by	Statute Law Revision Act 1863
Relates to	Administration of Intestates' Estate Act 1685; See Expiring laws continuance acts

Status: Repealed

Text of statute as originally enacted

The Continuance of Laws Act 1678 (30 Cha. 2. c. 6) was an act of the Parliament of England that continued the Death between Verdict and Judgment Act 1665 (17 Cha. 2. c. 8) and the Statute of Distribution (22 & 23 Cha. 2. c. 10) for 7 years.

== Background ==
In the United Kingdom, acts of Parliament remain in force until expressly repealed. Many acts of parliament, however, contained time-limited sunset clauses, requiring legislation to revive enactments that had expired or to continue enactments that would otherwise expire.

== Provisions ==
=== Revived and continued enactments ===
Section 1 of the act continued the Death between Verdict and Judgment Act 1665 (17 Cha. 2. c. 8) and the Statute of Distribution (22 & 23 Cha. 2. c. 10) until the next session of parliament 7 years after the start of the present session of parliament.

== Subsequent developments ==
The acts were made perpetual by section 5 of the Administration of Intestates' Estate Act 1685 (1 Ja. 2. c. 17).

The Select Committee on Temporary Laws, Expired or Expiring, appointed in 1796, inspected and considered all temporary laws, observing irregularities in the construction of expiring laws continuance acts, making recommendations and emphasising the importance of the Committee for Expired and Expiring Laws.

The whole act was repealed by section 1 of, and the schedule to, the Statute Law Revision Act 1966, which came into force on 10 March 1966.
