= Execution Act 1664 =

Act of the Parliament of England

Execution Act 1664 (Note: The citation of this act by this short title was authorised by section 5 of, and the second schedule to, the Statute Law Revision Act 1948. Due to the repeal of those provisions, it is now authorised by section 19(2) of the Interpretation Act 1978.)
- Act of Parliament
- Parliament of England
- Long title: An Act to prevent Delayes in Extending Statutes Judgements and Recognizances. (Note: These words are printed against this act in the second column of the second schedule to the Statute Law Revision Act 1948, which is headed "Title".)
- Citation: 16 & 17 Cha. 2. c. 5
- Territorial extent: England and Wales

Dates
- Royal assent: 2 March 1665
- Commencement: 24 November 1664 (Note: Start of session.)
- Repealed: 27 April 1965 (Note: The Administration of Justice Act 1965 (Commencement No. 1) Order 1965.)
Other legislation
Amended by	Extents Act 1670; Statute Law Revision Act 1863
Repealed by	Administration of Justice Act 1965

Status: Repealed

Text of statute as originally enacted

The Execution Act 1664 (16 & 17 Cha. 2. c. 5) was an act of the Parliament of England.

== Subsequent developments ==
Extents Act 1670
- Act of Parliament
- Parliament of England
- Long title: An Act for Continuance of a former Actt entituled "An Act to prevent Delayes in extending Statutes Judgements and Recognizances."
- Citation: 22 & 23 Cha. 2. c. 2
- Territorial extent: England and Wales

Dates
- Royal assent: 6 March 1671
- Commencement: 24 October 1670
- Repealed: 28 July 1863
Other legislation
Amends	Execution Act 1664
Repealed by	Statute Law Revision Act 1863

Status: Repealed

Text of statute as originally enacted

The whole act was made perpetual by section 1 of the Extents Act 1670 (22 & 23 Cha. 2. c. 2).

Section 4 of the act was repealed by section 1 of, and the schedule to, the Statute Law Revision Act 1863 (26 & 27 Vict. c. 125), which came into force on 28 July 1863.

The whole act was repealed by section 34(1) of, and schedule 2 to, the Administration of Justice Act 1965, which came into force on 27 April 1965.
