= Paul Amyraut =

- Born: Holy Roman Empire
- Died: South Repps, Norfolk, England
- Occupations: Clergyman, religious writer
- Years active: fl. 1636–1662
- Known for: Nonconformist ministry; report on the English translation of Martin Luther’s Table Talk
- Notable work: The Triumph of a Good Conscience; Sacramental Discourses; A Discourse on the Life of Faith

Paul Amyraut (or Paul Amarott; fl. 1636–1662) was an English divine and religious writer of German origin.

== Biography ==
He was ejected in 1662 from living in Munsley, in Norfolk. His name is first found at Ermington, in Norfolk. Here he was an early sufferer for his nonconformity. Of the Lutherans, he was pronouncedly ‘evangelical’ and anti-ritual. In 1636 he was cited before Wren, bishop of Norwich—a Laud in miniature—and ‘suspended’ for not ‘bowing at the name of Jesus.’ That was the bishop's answer to Amyraut's argument that Philippians ii. 10 gave no warrant for such ‘bowing.’ He was somewhat later of Wolterton, also in Norfolk, where also he was ‘deprived,’ as appears from the following entry in the register of the diocese of Norwich in the year 1638: ‘Decimo tertio die Julii anno Domini pred. Thomas Wolsey Clīcus in Artibus Magēr institutus fuit in Rectoriam pred. p. deprivacōem Pauli Amarott Clīci ult. incumbent.’ Thereupon he passed into Essex, but where has not been traced.

He is next heard of in the House of Commons of England. When Captain Henrie Bell translated Martin Luther's ‘Table Talk,’ Laud refused him a licence for its publication (1644). The House of Commons, having been informed of this, summoned Bell before them, ‘and did appoint a committee to see it and the translation, and diligently to make enquiries whether the translation did agree with the original or no.’ ‘Whereupon,’ Bell narrates, ‘they desired me to bring the same before them, sitting then in the treasury chamber. And Sir Edward Dearing [Deering], being chairman, said unto mee that he was acquainted with a learned minister beneficed in Essex, who had long lived in England, but was born in High Germanie, in the palatinate, Paul Amyraut, whom the committee sending for, desired him to take both the original and my translation into his custodie, and diligently to compare them together, and to make report unto the said committee whether he found that I had rightly and truly translated it according to the original; which report he made accordingly.’ The book was then ‘licensed,’ and Amyraut's ‘report’ was prefixed to it. The great folio translation has an important place in English literary history.

In 1648 Amyraut had returned to Norfolk, and was then vicar of East Dereham, a living which, according to Walker's ‘Sufferings,’ had been ‘sequestered’ from a John Bretten. While at East Dereham he published ‘The Triumph of a Good Conscience’ (Rev. ii. 10), one of the rarest of later puritan books. From thence he was transferred to Munsley, in the same county, which had been ‘sequestered’ from John Tenison, father of the more famous archbishop of that name. It would seem that Amyraut was resolute in his nonconformity, and took no time to delay the sacrifice. Calamy and Palmer range him under 1662; but it is probable that he was ‘ejected’ under the Restoring of Ministers Act 1660 (12 Cha. 2. c. 17), as a few of the ‘two thousand’ were. He was old at the time of his ejection, and he afterwards silently disappeared. Christopher Amyraut, ejected from Buckenham (New), was, it is believed, his son. In his later days he was pastor of an ‘independent’ church at South Repps, where he died. He was author of Sacramental Discourses upon several subjects and A Discourse on the Life of Faith.
