= Statute of Distribution =

Act of the Parliament of England

Statute of Distribution (Note: The citation of this act by this short title was authorised by section 1 of, and the first schedule to, the Short Titles Act 1896. Due to the repeal of those provisions it is now authorised by section 19(2) of the Interpretation Act 1978.)
- Act of Parliament
- Parliament of England
- Long title: An Act for the better settling of intestates' estates. (Note: These words are printed against this act in the second column of the first schedule to the Short Titles Act 1896, which is headed "Title".)
- Citation: 22 & 23 Cha. 2. c. 10
- Territorial extent: England and Wales

Dates
- Royal assent: 22 April 1671
- Commencement: 1 June 1671 (Note: Section 1.)
- Repealed: 1 January 1926 not affecting deaths occurring before; =
Other legislation
Amended by	Continuance of Laws Act 1678; Administration of Intestates' Estate Act 1685; Statute Law Revision Act 1863; Statute Law Revision Act 1863; Law of Property (Amendment) Act 1924
Repealed by	Administration of Estates Act 1925
Relates to	Statute of Frauds

Status: Repealed

Text of statute as originally enacted

The Statute of Distribution (22 & 23 Cha. 2. c. 10) was an act of the Parliament of England in 1670. It deals with the administration of intestate estates.

== Subsequent developments ==
The act was continued until the next session of parliament after 7 years by section 1 of the Continuance of Laws Act 1678 (30 Cha. 2. c. 6).

The whole act was made perpetual by the Administration of Intestates' Estate Act 1685 (1 Ja. 2. c. 17).

Section 7 of the act was repealed by section 1 of, and the schedule to, the Statute Law Revision Act 1863 (26 & 27 Vict. c. 125), which came into force on 28 July 1863.

The whole act, so far as it applied to deaths occurring after 1 January 1926 was repealed by section 56 of, and part I of the second schedule to, the Administration of Estates Act 1925 (15 & 16 Geo. 5. c. 23), which came into force on 1 January 1926.

For the construction of references to Statutes of Distribution, see section 50 of the Administration of Estates Act 1925 (15 & 16 Geo. 5. c. 23) and section 19 of the Administration of Estates Act (Northern Ireland) 1955.
