= List of acts of the Parliament of England from 1678 =

This is a list of acts of the Parliament of England for the year 1678.

For acts passed during the period 1707–1800, see the list of acts of the Parliament of Great Britain. See also the list of acts of the Parliament of Scotland, and the list of acts of the Parliament of Ireland.

For acts passed from 1801 onwards, see the list of acts of the Parliament of the United Kingdom. For acts of the devolved parliaments and assemblies in the United Kingdom, see the list of acts of the Scottish Parliament, the list of acts of the Northern Ireland Assembly, and the list of acts and measures of Senedd Cymru; see also the list of acts of the Parliament of Northern Ireland.

For medieval statutes, etc. that are not considered to be acts of Parliament, see the list of English statutes.

See also the List of ordinances and acts of the Parliament of England, 1642–1660 for ordinances and acts passed by the Long Parliament and other bodies without royal assent, and which were not considered to be valid legislation following the Restoration in 1660.

The number shown after each act's title is its chapter number. Acts are cited using this number, preceded by the years of the reign during which the relevant parliamentary session was held; thus the Union with Ireland Act 1800 is cited as "39 & 40 Geo. 3. c. 67", meaning the 67th act passed during the session that started in the 39th year of the reign of George III and which finished in the 40th year of that reign. The modern convention is to use Arabic numerals in citations (thus "41 Geo. 3" rather than "41 Geo. III"). Acts of the last session of the Parliament of Great Britain and the first session of the Parliament of the United Kingdom are both cited as "41 Geo. 3".

Acts passed by the Parliament of England did not have a short title; however, some of these acts have subsequently been given a short title by acts of the Parliament of the United Kingdom, such as the Short Titles Act 1896 (59 & 60 Vict. c. 14).

Acts passed by the Parliament of England were deemed to have come into effect on the first day of the session in which they were passed. Because of this, the years given in the list below may in fact be the year before a particular act was passed.

== 30 Cha. 2 ==
The sixteenth session of the 2nd Parliament of King Charles II (the 'Cavalier Parliament'), which met from 23 May 1678 until 15 July 1678.

This session was also traditionally cited as 30 Car. 2 (Chronological Table of the Statutes), 30 Chas. 2 or 30 C. 2.

=== Public acts ===
Short title	Citation	Royal assent
Long title
Taxation Act 1678 (repealed)	30 Cha. 2. c. 1	15 July 1678
An Act for granting a Supply to His Majestie of Six hundred nineteene thousand three hundred eighty eight pounds eleaven shillings and nine pence for disbanding the Army and other uses therein mentioned. (Repealed by Statute Law Revision Act 1863 (26 & 27 Vict. c. 125))
Taxation (Wine) Act 1678 (repealed)	30 Cha. 2. c. 2	15 July 1678
An Act for granting an additionall Duty to His Majestie upon Wines for Three years. (Repealed by Statute Law Revision Act 1863 (26 & 27 Vict. c. 125))
Burying in Woollen Act 1678 (repealed)	30 Cha. 2. c. 3	15 July 1678
An Act for burying in Woollen. (Repealed by Burying in Woollen Act 1814 (54 Geo. 3. c. 108))
Insolvent Debtors Relief Act 1678 (repealed)	30 Cha. 2. c. 4	15 July 1678
An Act for the further Reliefe and Discharge of poore distressed Prisoners for Debt. (Repealed by Statute Law Revision Act 1863 (26 & 27 Vict. c. 125))
Highways Act 1678 (repealed)	30 Cha. 2. c. 5	15 July 1678
An Act for repealeing certaine words in a Clause in a former Act entituled "An Act for enlargeing and repaireing of Common Highwayes". (Note: Highways Act 1662 (14 Cha. 2. c. 6)) (Repealed by Statute Law Revision Act 1863 (26 & 27 Vict. c. 125))
Continuance of Laws Act 1678 (repealed)	30 Cha. 2. c. 6	15 July 1678
An Act for reviveing a former Act entituled "An Act for avoiding unnecessary Suits and Delayes" and for continuance of one, other Act entituled "An Act for the better settleing of Intestates Estates". (Note: Statute of Distribution (22 & 23 Cha. 2. c. 10)) (Repealed by Statute Law Revision Act 1863 (26 & 27 Vict. c. 125))
Executors of Executors (Waste) Act 1678 (repealed)	30 Cha. 2. c. 7	15 July 1678
An Act to enable Creditors to recover their Debts of the Executors and Administrators of Executors in their owne wrong. (Repealed by Administration of Estates Act 1925 (15 & 16 Geo. 5. c. 23))
Newcastle (Sale of Coal by Measured Keels) Act 1678 (repealed)	30 Cha. 2. c. 8	15 July 1678
An Act for the Admeasurement of Keeles and Boates carrying Coales. (Repealed by Statute Law Revision Act 1948 (11 & 12 Geo. 6. c. 62))
Fishing in the Severn Act 1678 (repealed)	30 Cha. 2. c. 9	15 July 1678
An Act for Preservation of Fishing in the River of Seaverne. (Repealed by Salmon Fishery Act 1861 (24 & 25 Vict. c. 109))

=== Private acts ===
Short title	Citation	Royal assent
Long title
Williams' Estate Act 1678	30 Cha. 2. c. 10 Pr.	15 July 1678
An Act to supply an Omission in the Settlement of the Estate of Sir Trevor Williams Baronet, made upon the Marriage of his Eldest Son; and to enable his Eldest Son to make a Jointure to a Second Wife.
Dean of St. Paul's Estate Act 1678	30 Cha. 2. c. 11 Pr.	15 July 1678
An Act for increasing the Revenue of the Dean of St. Paul's, and assuring the Estates of his Tenants in Shadwell, in the County of Midd.
Gresham's Estate Act 1678	30 Cha. 2. c. 12 Pr.	15 July 1678
An Act for vesting the Rectory of Westerham, in the County of Kent, in Trustees, to be sold, for Payment of the Debts of Edward Gresham Esquire.
Cave's Estate Act 1678	30 Cha. 2. c. 13 Pr.	15 July 1678
An Act for the better enabling Trustees of Sir Thomas Cave Knight and Baronet, deceased, for the selling of Lands for the Performance of the Will of the said Sir Thomas Cave, and likewise for the vesting and settling of other Lands.
Uniting Churches of Beaumont and Moze (Essex) Act 1678	30 Cha. 2. c. 14 Pr.	15 July 1678
An Act for uniting and consolidating the Churches of Beaumont and Mose, in the County of Essex.
Fortescue's Estate Act 1678	30 Cha. 2. c. 15 Pr.	15 July 1678
An Act on the Behalf of John Fortescue, for the executing certain Trusts devolved upon Infants.
Creation of St. Anne's Parish, Westminster Act 1678 (repealed)	30 Cha. 2. c. 16 Pr.	15 July 1678
An Act for making Part of the Parish of St. Martin's in the Feilds a new Parish, to be called The Parish of St. Anne within the Liberty of Westminster. (Repealed by Saint Anne, Soho Act 1965 (c. v))
Mulso's Estate Act 1678	30 Cha. 2. c. 17 Pr.	15 July 1678
An Act to enable Trustees to sell the Lands of Tanfeild Mulso Esquire, late deceased, for Payment of his Debts, and making Provision for his Children.
Schoppens', &c. Naturalization Act 1678	30 Cha. 2. c. 18 Pr.	15 July 1678
An Act for naturalizing of John Schoppens and others.
Forth's Estate Act 1678	30 Cha. 2. c. 19 Pr.	15 July 1678
An Act to make good a Mortgage made by John Forth, deceased, to Thomas Cooke and Nicholas Carey; and for making Provision for Henry Forth, Son of the said John Forth.
River Fal Navigation Act 1678	30 Cha. 2. c. 20 Pr.	15 July 1678
An Act for making navigable the River Fale alias Vale, in the County of Cornwall.
Plater's Estate etc. Act 1678	30 Cha. 2. c. 21 Pr.	15 July 1678
An Act to enable Thomas Plater Gentleman to sell Lands, for Payment of Debts charged upon the same, and reimbursing him such Sums of Money as he hath or shall lay out, in repairing the Breaches made by the Inundation of the Sea, and keeping the Waters out.

=== Sources ===
- Raithby, John, ed. (1963) [1819]. "30° Car. II.". Statutes of the Realm. Vol. 5: The Statutes of King Charles I and King Charles II (1625–1680). London: Dawsons. pp. 867–893 – via HathiTrust.
- Raithby, John, ed. (1819). Statutes of the Realm. Vol. 5: 1628-80 – via British History Online.
- Pickering, Danby, ed. (1763). "Anno tricesimo Caroli II". The Statutes at Large. Vol. 8: From the Twelfth Year of King Charles II to the Last Year of King James II. Inclusive. Cambridge: Joseph Bentham. pp. 419–427 – via Internet Archive.
- Journal of the House of Commons. Vol. 9. London: His Majesty's Stationery Office. 1803. pp. 480–515 – via Google Books.
- Chronological Table of and Index to the Statutes. Vol. 1: To the End of the Session 59 Vict. Sess. 2 (1895) (13th ed.). London: Her Majesty's Stationery Office. 1896. p. 73 – via Google Books.
- Chronological Table of the Statutes: Covering the Period from 1235 to the End of 1971. London: Her Majesty's Stationery Office. 1972. p. 71. ISBN 978-0-11-840096-1 – via Google Books.
- "Chronological Tables of the Private and Personal Acts: Part 3 (1660–1680)". legislation.gov.uk. The National Archives.

== 30 Cha. 2 St. 2 ==
The seventeenth session of the 2nd Parliament of King Charles II (the 'Cavalier Parliament') which met from 21 October 1678 until 30 December 1678.

No private acts were passed in this session.

This session was also traditionally cited as 30 Car. 2. Stat. 2 (Chronological Table of the Statutes), 30 Car. 2. St. 2, 30 Chas. 2. St. 2 or 30 C. 2. St. 2.

=== Public acts ===
Short title	Citation	Royal assent
Long title
Parliament Act 1678 or the Test Act 1678 (repealed)	30 Cha. 2. St. 2. c. 1	30 November 1678
An Act for the more effectuall preserving the Kings Person and Government by disableing Papists from sitting in either House of Parlyament. (Repealed by Parliamentary Oaths Act 1866 (29 & 30 Vict. c. 19))

=== Sources ===
- Raithby, John, ed. (1963) [1819]. "30° Car. II. Stat. 2". Statutes of the Realm. Vol. 5: The Statutes of King Charles I and King Charles II (1625–1680). London: Dawsons. pp. 894–896 – via HathiTrust.
- Raithby, John, ed. (1819). Statutes of the Realm. Vol. 5: 1628-80 – via British History Online.
- Pickering, Danby, ed. (1763). "Anno tricesimo Caroli II (Stat. 2)". The Statutes at Large. Vol. 8: From the Twelfth Year of King Charles II to the Last Year of King James II. Inclusive. Cambridge: Joseph Bentham. pp. 427–432 – via Internet Archive.
- Journal of the House of Commons. Vol. 9. London: His Majesty's Stationery Office. 1803. pp. 516–566 – via Google Books.
- Chronological Table of and Index to the Statutes. Vol. 1: To the End of the Session 59 Vict. Sess. 2 (1895) (13th ed.). London: Her Majesty's Stationery Office. 1896. p. 73 – via Google Books.
- Chronological Table of the Statutes: Covering the Period from 1235 to the End of 1971. London: Her Majesty's Stationery Office. 1972. p. 71. ISBN 978-0-11-840096-1 – via Google Books.

== See also ==
- List of acts of the Parliament of England
