= Poor Relief Act 1691 =

Act of the Parliament of England

Poor Relief Act 1691 (Note: The citation of this act by this short title was authorised by section 1 of, and the first schedule to, the Short Titles Act 1896. Due to the repeal of those provisions it is now authorised by section 19(2) of the Interpretation Act 1978.)
- Act of Parliament
- Parliament of England
- Long title: An Act for the better explanation and supplying the defects of the former laws for the settlement of the poor. (Note: These words are printed against this act in the second column of the first schedule to the Short Titles Act 1896, which is headed "Title".)
- Citation: 3 Will. & Mar. c. 11 (Note: Also cited as 3 & 4 Will & Mary c 11: The Revised Reports. Sweet & Maxwell Limited. 1857. Volume 116. Pages 943 and 951.)
- Territorial extent: England and Wales

Dates
- Royal assent: 24 February 1692
- Commencement: 22 October 1691 (Note: Start of session.)
- Repealed: 1 October 1927
Other legislation
Amends	Poor Relief Act 1662
Amended by	Statute Law Revision Act 1867; Summary Jurisdiction Act 1884; Statute Law Revision Act 1887; Statute Law Revision Act 1888
Repealed by	Poor Law Act 1927
Relates to	Administration of Intestates' Estate Act 1685; Estreats (Personal Representatives) Act 1692; Exportation (No. 2) Act 1698; Continuance of Laws Act 1706; Poor Act 1712

Status: Repealed

Text of statute as originally enacted

The Poor Relief Act 1691 (3 Will. & Mar. c. 11) was an act of the Parliament of England.

== Provisions ==
Section 1 of the act revived the Poor Relief Act 1662 (14 Cha. 2. c. 12), as amended by the Administration of Intestates' Estate Act 1685 (1 Ja. 2. c. 17), from 1 March 1691.

An attorney's clerk, articled by indenture, was an apprentice within the meaning of section 8 of the act, and, as such, gained a settlement under this act in the parish in which he inhabited while serving under his articles.

== Subsequent developments ==
Sections 1–4 (which are sections 2–5 in Ruffhead's Edition of the Statutes, by Serjeant Runnington, 1786), section 5 (section 6 in Ruffhead's Edition) from "shall for" to "year or," and sections 6 (section 7 in Ruffhead's Edition) and 12, of the act, were repealed by section 1 of, and the schedule to, the Statute Law Revision Act 1867 (30 & 31 Vict. c. 59), which came into force on 15 July 1867.

Section 11 of the act was repealed by section 1 of, and the schedule to, the Statute Law Revision Act 1887 (50 & 51 Vict. c. 59), which came into force on 16 September 1887.

The whole act was repealed by section 245(1) of, and the eleventh schedule to, the Poor Law Act 1927 (17 & 18 Geo. 5. c. 14), which came into force on 1 October 1927.
