= Poor Removal Act 1795 =

Act of the Parliament of Great Britain

Poor Removal Act 1795 (Note: The citation of this act by this short title was authorised by section 1 of, and the first schedule to, the Short Titles Act 1896. Due to the repeal of those provisions it is now authorised by section 19(2) of the Interpretation Act 1978.)
- Act of Parliament
- Parliament of Great Britain
- Long title: An act to prevent the removal of poor persons, until they shall become actually chargeable.
- Citation: 35 Geo. 3. c. 101
- Territorial extent: Great Britain

Dates
- Royal assent: 22 June 1795
- Commencement: 22 June 1795 (Note: Section 1.)
- Repealed: 1 October 1927
Other legislation
Amends	Settlement Act 1662
Amended by	Statute Law Revision Act 1871
Repealed by	Poor Law Act 1927

Status: Repealed

Text of statute as originally enacted

The Poor Removal Act 1795 (35 Geo. 3. c. 101), sometimes called the Removal Act 1795, was an act of the Parliament of Great Britain which modified the Poor Relief Act 1662 (14 Cha. 2. c. 12), an act which concerned when a pauper could receive poor relief. The effect of the Removal Act was "that no non-settled person could be removed from a parish unless he or she applied for relief." The act stated that the earlier settlement certificate system "hath been found very ineffectual".

== Subsequent developments ==
Section 2 from "Provided that nothing" to end, section 3, except the Proviso, section 4 to "incapacitated to pursue," and section 6 of the act were repealed by section 1 of, and the schedule to, the Statute Law Revision Act 1871 (34 & 35 Vict. c. 116), which came into force on 21 August 1871.

The whole act was repealed by section 245(1) of, and the eleventh schedule to, Poor Law Act 1927 (17 & 18 Geo. 5. c. 14), which came into force on 1 October 1927.
