= Wool Act 1698 =

Act of the Parliament of England

- Act of Parliament
- Parliament of England
- Long title: An Act to prevent the Exportation of Wool out of the Kingdoms of Ireland and England into Forreigne parts and for the Incouragement of the Woollen Manufactures in the Kingdom of England
- Citation: 10 Will. 3. c. 16 (Note: This is the citation in The Statutes of the Realm.); 10 & 11 Will. 3. c. 10 (Note: This is the citation in The Statutes at Large.)
- Territorial extent: England and Wales; Ireland; (Note: Preamble.)

Dates
- Royal assent: 4 May 1699
- Commencement: 24 June 1699 (Note: Section 1.)
- Repealed: 5 July 1825
Other legislation
Amended by	Exportation (No. 2) Act 1698; Taxation Act 1698; Weights and Measures Act 1824
Repealed by	Customs Law Repeal Act 1825

Status: Repealed

Text of statute as originally enacted

The Wool Act 1698 (10 Will. 3. c. 16) (or the Woolens Act) was an act of the Parliament of England, long titled An Act to prevent the Exportation of Wool out of the Kingdoms of Ireland and England into Forreigne parts and for the Incouragement of the Woollen Manufactures in the Kingdom of England.

== Provisions ==
The act was intended to increase England's woolen product manufacturing by preventing Irish wool production, manufactures, and export; it also forbade the export of wool and products from the American colonies. Competing woolens from these areas had recently become more available in foreign and domestic markets. The act prohibited American colonists from exporting wool and wool products, or export to markets outside the individual colony in which it was produced, or to be transported from one place to another in the same colony. The act did not forbid the making of woolen fabrics for private consumption, but simply forbade the making of woolens for the public market. At this time the woolens exported from England had to pay heavy export duties. The act, one of the Acts of Trade and Navigation, was mainly aimed at Irish woolens and established a policy to crush the Irish woolen industry. It had little effect on the American colonies; at most it only slowed the potential industry. Shopkeepers had a very hard time during this period when the Wool Act was in force. Some colonists opposed this act by buying more flax and hemp.

== Subsequent developments ==
Exportation (No. 2) Act 1698
- Act of Parliament
- Parliament of England
- Long title: An Act for continueing severall Laws therein mentioned, and for explaining the Act intituled An Act to prevent the Exportation of Wooll out of the Kingdoms of Ireland and England into Forreigne Parts and for the Incouragement of the Woollen Manufactures in the Kingdom of England.
- Citation: 11 Will. 3. c. 13; 11 & 12 Will. 3. c. 13
- Territorial extent: England and Wales; Ireland

Dates
- Royal assent: 11 April 1700
- Commencement: 29 September 1700
- Repealed: 15 July 1867
Other legislation
Amends	Poor Relief Act 1662; Wool Act 1699
Repealed by	Statute Law Revision Act 1867
Relates to	Administration of Intestates' Estate Act 1685; Poor Relief Act 1691; Estreats (Personal Representatives) Act 1692; Continuance of Laws Act 1706; Poor Act 1712

Status: Repealed

Text of statute as originally enacted

Taxation (No. 3) Act 1698
- Act of Parliament
- Parliament of England
- Long title: An Act for takeing away the Duties upon the Woollen Manufactures, Corn Grain Bread Biscuit and Meal exported.
- Citation: 11 Will. 3. c. 20; 11 & 12 Will. 3. c. 20
- Territorial extent: England and Wales

Dates
- Royal assent: 11 April 1700
- Commencement: 30 March 1700
- Repealed: 5 July 1825
Other legislation
Amends	Wool Act 1699
Amended by	Taxation (No. 5) Act 1706
Repealed by	Statute Law Revision Act 1867

Status: Repealed

Text of statute as originally enacted

An exception to the act was passed the following year in the Exportation (No. 2) Act 1698 (11 Will. 3. c. 13 s. 9), which allowed these exports if they were for the use by the ship's crews and passengers. Later in the year however, duties were abolished for English exportation of manufactured woolens and other products by the Taxation (No. 3) Act 1698 (11 Will. 3. c. 20).

The whole act was repealed by section 444 of the Customs Law Repeal Act 1825 (6 Geo. 4. c. 105), which came into force on 5 July 1825. The act formed part of trade liberation reforms.

== See also ==
- Burying in Woollen Acts
