= Adam Anderson (economist) =

Scottish economist

Adam Anderson (1692 or 1693 – 10 January 1765) was a Scottish economist.

== Biography ==
He was a clerk for forty years or more in South Sea House, the headquarters of the South Sea Company; at his death at Clerkenwell in 1765, he had risen to chief clerk for the Stock and New Annuities of the South Sea Company.

His life's work, commonly known as Anderson's History of Commerce, was published shortly before his death. The long, actual title is An Historical and Chronological Deduction of the Origin of Commerce from the Earliest Accounts to the Present Time. The title page goes on to say: "Containing, an History of the great Commercial Interests of the British Empire. To which is prefixed, an Introduction, Exhibiting a View of the Ancient and Modern State of Europe; of the Importance of Our Colonies; and of the Commerce, Shipping, Manufactures, Fisheries, &c. of Great Britain and Ireland: and their Influence on the Landed Interest. With an Appendix, containing the Modern Politico-Commercial Geography of the several Countries of Europe."

The work was reissued with a somewhat shorter title in four folio volumes in 1787.

The freemason James Anderson may have been his brother.
