= List of acts of the Parliament of England from 1670 =

This is a list of acts of the Parliament of England for the year 1670.

For acts passed during the period 1707–1800, see the list of acts of the Parliament of Great Britain. See also the list of acts of the Parliament of Scotland, and the list of acts of the Parliament of Ireland.

For acts passed from 1801 onwards, see the list of acts of the Parliament of the United Kingdom. For acts of the devolved parliaments and assemblies in the United Kingdom, see the list of acts of the Scottish Parliament, the list of acts of the Northern Ireland Assembly, and the list of acts and measures of Senedd Cymru; see also the list of acts of the Parliament of Northern Ireland.

For medieval statutes, etc. that are not considered to be acts of Parliament, see the list of English statutes.

See also the List of ordinances and acts of the Parliament of England, 1642–1660 for ordinances and acts passed by the Long Parliament and other bodies without royal assent, and which were not considered to be valid legislation following the Restoration in 1660.

The number shown after each act's title is its chapter number. Acts are cited using this number, preceded by the years of the reign during which the relevant parliamentary session was held; thus the Union with Ireland Act 1800 is cited as "39 & 40 Geo. 3. c. 67", meaning the 67th act passed during the session that started in the 39th year of the reign of George III and which finished in the 40th year of that reign. The modern convention is to use Arabic numerals in citations (thus "41 Geo. 3" rather than "41 Geo. III"). Acts of the last session of the Parliament of Great Britain and the first session of the Parliament of the United Kingdom are both cited as "41 Geo. 3".

Acts passed by the Parliament of England did not have a short title; however, some of these acts have subsequently been given a short title by acts of the Parliament of the United Kingdom, such as the Short Titles Act 1896 (59 & 60 Vict. c. 14).

Acts passed by the Parliament of England were deemed to have come into effect on the first day of the session in which they were passed. Because of this, the years given in the list below may in fact be the year before a particular act was passed.

== 22 Cha. 2 ==
The first part of the ninth session of the 2nd Parliament of King Charles II (the 'Cavalier Parliament'), from 14 February 1670 until 11 April 1670.

The eighth session, October–December 1669, did not pass any acts.

This session was traditionally cited as 22 Car 2, 22 Car. 2. Stat. 1, 22 Chas. 2, 22 Chas. 2. Stat. 1, 22 C. 2 or 22 C. 2. Stat. 1; it is listed in the "Chronological Table of the Statutes" as 22 Car. 2. Stat. 1.

=== Public acts ===
Short title	Citation	Royal assent
Long title
Conventicles Act 1670 (repealed)	22 Cha. 2. c. 1	11 April 1670
An Act to prevent and suppress Seditious Conventicles. (Repealed by Places of Religious Worship Act 1812 (52 Geo. 3. c. 155))
Yarmouth Haven and Pier Repairs (Duties) Act 1670 (repealed)	22 Cha. 2. c. 2	11 April 1670
An Act for repaireing of the Haven and Peers of Great Yarmouth. (Repealed by Statute Law Revision Act 1948 (11 & 12 Geo. 6. c. 62))
Taxation (Wines and Vinegar) Act 1670 (repealed)	22 Cha. 2. c. 3	11 April 1670
An Act for granting unto his Majestie an Imposition upon all Wines and Vinegar imported betweene the 24th Day of June One thousand six hundred seaventy and the 24th Day of June One thousand six hundred seaventy eight. (Repealed by Statute Law Revision Act 1863 (26 & 27 Vict. c. 125))
Taxation (Brandy) Act 1670 (repealed)	22 Cha. 2. c. 4	11 April 1670
An Act for setleing the Imposition on Brandy. (Repealed by Statute Law Revision Act 1863 (26 & 27 Vict. c. 125))
Benefit of Clergy Act 1670 (repealed)	22 Cha. 2. c. 5	11 April 1670
An Act for takeing away the Benefit of Clergy from such as steale Cloth from the Racke and from such as shall steale or imbezill his Majestyes Ammunition and Stores. (Repealed for England and Wales by Criminal Statutes Repeal Act 1827 (7 & 8 Geo. 4. c. 27) and for India by Criminal Law (India) Act 1828 (9 Geo. 4. c. 74))
Duchy of Cornwall Act 1670 (repealed)	22 Cha. 2. c. 6	11 April 1670
An Act for advanceing the Sale of Fee-Farme Rents and other Rents. (Repealed by Duchy of Lancaster Act 1779 (19 Geo. 3. c. 45), Crown Land Revenues, etc. Act 1786 (26 Geo. 3. c. 87) and Statute Law Revision Act 1948 (11 & 12 Geo. 6. c. 62))
Duchy of Cornwall (No. 2) Act 1670 (repealed)	22 Cha. 2. c. 7	11 April 1670
An Act to enable the Kings Majestie to make Leases, Grants and Copyes of Offices, Lands Tenements and Hereditaments Parcell of his Highnesse Dutchy of Cornwall, or annexed to the same. (Repealed by Statute Law Revision Act 1948 (11 & 12 Geo. 6. c. 62))
Measures Act 1670 (repealed)	22 Cha. 2. c. 8	11 April 1670
An Act for ascertaining the Measures of Corne and Salt. (Repealed by Statute Law Revision Act 1863 (26 & 27 Vict. c. 125))
Union between England and Scotland Act 1670 (repealed)	22 Cha. 2. c. 9	11 April 1670
An Act authorizing certaine Commissioners of the Realme of England to treate with Commissioners of Scotland for the Weale of both Kingdomes. (Repealed by Statute Law Revision Act 1863 (26 & 27 Vict. c. 125))
Sale of Sir John Prittiman's Lands Act 1670 (repealed)	22 Cha. 2. c. 10	11 April 1670
An Act for sale of part of the Estate of Sir John Prittiman for satisfaction of a Debt by him due to the Kings Majestie. (Repealed by Statute Law Revision Act 1948 (11 & 12 Geo. 6. c. 62))
Rebuilding of London Act 1670	22 Cha. 2. c. 11	11 April 1670
Act for the rebuilding of the City of London, uniting of Parishes and rebuilding of the Cathedral and Parochial Churches within the said City.
Bridges Act 1670 (repealed)	22 Cha. 2. c. 12	11 April 1670
An Additionall Act for the better repairing of Highwayes and Bridges. (Repealed by Statute Law (Repeals) Act 1973 (c. 39))
Tillage Act 1670 (repealed)	22 Cha. 2. c. 13	11 April 1670
An Act for Improvement of Tillage and the Breede of Catle. (Repealed by Statute Law Revision Act 1863 (26 & 27 Vict. c. 125))
Deeping Fen Act 1670 or the Deeping Fens Drainage Act 1670 (repealed)	22 Cha. 2. c. 14 (Note: Also cited as 22 Cha. 2. c. 15 Pr.)	11 April 1670
An Act for settling the drayneing of the Fennes in Lincolnshire called Deepeing Fennes. (Repealed by Deeping Fen Drainage Act 1856 (19 & 20 Vict. c. lxv))

=== Private acts ===
Short title	Citation	Royal assent
Long title
Lord Roos Divorce Act 1670	22 Cha. 2. c. 1 Pr.	11 April 1670
An Act for John Mannors, called Lord Roos, to marry again.
Bishop of Rochester's Charities Act 1670	22 Cha. 2. c. 2 Pr.	11 April 1670
An Act for settling certain Charitable Uses devised by John late Bishop of Rochester.
Enabling Anthony Ashley to acknowledge fines and suffer recoveries of lands while he is under 21 years old.	22 Cha. 2. c. 3 Pr.	11 April 1670
An Act to enable Anthony Ashley Esquire, Son of the Lord Ashley, to acknowledge Fines, and suffer Recoveries, of Lands or Hereditaments, while he is under the Age of Twenty and One Years.
Bellasis' Estate Act 1670	22 Cha. 2. c. 4 Pr.	11 April 1670
An Act for settling Part of the Estate of Dame Suzan Bellasise Widow, late Wife of Sir Henry Bellasise deceased.
Confirmation of purchasers' estates and settling differences between Lady Elizabeth Lee and the daughters and coheirs of Earl of Downe.	22 Cha. 2. c. 5 Pr.	11 April 1670
An Act for confirming Purchasers Estates, and for settling the Differences, between the Lady Elizabeth Lee and the Daughters and Coheirs of the late Earl of Downe.
Viscount Strangford's Estate Act 1670	22 Cha. 2. c. 6 Pr.	11 April 1670
An Act to enable the Trustees for the Lord Viscount Strangford, of the Kingdom of Ireland, to sell certain Lands, for the Payment of the Remainder of his Debts.
Gostwicke's Estate Act 1670	22 Cha. 2. c. 7 Pr.	11 April 1670
An Act for the enabling Sir William Gostwick Knight to make a Jointure to Dame Mary his Wife.
Bankes' Estate Act 1670	22 Cha. 2. c. 8 Pr.	11 April 1670
An Act for confirming the Estate of Sir Ralph Banks, in the Manor of Thesbesket, alias Thirsbesket, and other Lands, in the County, and County and Borough, of Carmarthen.
Heron's Estate Act 1670	22 Cha. 2. c. 9 Pr.	11 April 1670
An Act for Sale of Lands, to pay the Debts, and raise Portions for the Younger Children, of Sir Cutbert Heron Baronet.
Farewell's Estate Act 1670	22 Cha. 2. c. 10 Pr.	11 April 1670
An Act to enable Dame Elizabeth Routh, Mother and Executrix of the last Will and Testament of Dorothy Farewell Widow, deceased, late the Relict and Executrix of John Farewell, late of The Inner Temple, London, Esquire, to sell Lands, for the Payment of Debts.
Sale of manor of Firbeck (Yorkshire) and other lands for payment of debts.	22 Cha. 2. c. 11 Pr.	11 April 1670
An Act for settling the Manor or Lordship of Firbeck, in the County of York, and other Lands therein mentioned, on Trustees, to enable them to sell the same, for the Payment of Debts.
Building a mansion house for the dean of St. Paul's Church, London.	22 Cha. 2. c. 12 Pr.	11 April 1670
An Act for the building of a Mansion-house for the Dean of St. Paul's Church, London.
Disposing of a house and lands belonging to sisters and coheirs of Margaret Strode.	22 Cha. 2. c. 13 Pr.	11 April 1670
An Act concerning the disposing of a House and Lands belonging to the Sisters and Coheirs of Margaret Stroude.
Shadwell Church Act 1670	22 Cha. 2. c. 14 Pr.	11 April 1670
An Act for Endowment of a Church at Shadwell, now in the Parish of Stepney, in Midd. and making of it Parochial, distinct from Stepney.
Deeping Fen Act 1670 or the Deeping Fens Drainage Act 1670	22 Cha. 2. c. 15 Pr. (Note: Also cited as 22 Cha. 2. c. 14)	11 April 1670
An Act for settling the Draining of the Fens in Lyncolneshire, called Deeping Fenns.
Rivers Brandon and Waveney Navigation Act 1670	22 Cha. 2. c. 16 Pr.	11 April 1670
An Act for making navigable the Rivers commonly called Brandon and Waveney.
Hord's Estate Act 1670	22 Cha. 2. c. 17 Pr.	11 April 1670
An Act to enable Thomas Horde Esquire to make Leases of his Estate.
Beckham's Estate Act 1670	22 Cha. 2. c. 18 Pr.	11 April 1670
An Act to enable Richard Beckham and others to sell Lands, to pay his Father's Debts, and raise Portions for his Younger Brothers.
Bill's Estate Act 1670	22 Cha. 2. c. 19 Pr.	11 April 1670
An Act to enable John Bill Esquire to sell certain Lands, in Kent and Surry.
Leigh's Estate Act 1670	22 Cha. 2. c. 20 Pr.	11 April 1670
An Act for enabling Thomas Leigh Esquire to sell Part of his Lands, for Payment of his Debts.
Hotchkin's Estate Act 1670	22 Cha. 2. c. 21 Pr.	11 April 1670
An Act to enable Robert Hotchkin to sell Lands, to pay Debts, and raise Portions for Daughters.
Perkins' Estate Act 1670	22 Cha. 2. c. 22 Pr.	11 April 1670
An Act to enable Henry and Jane Perkins to ensure to Doctor Wharton Lands purchased in the County Palatine of Durham.
Davison's Estate Act 1670	22 Cha. 2. c. 23 Pr.	11 April 1670
An Act to enable Thomas Davidson to sell Lands, to pay Debts and provide for Younger Children.
Naturalization of Captain Christopher Gunman and others.	22 Cha. 2. c. 24 Pr.	11 April 1670
An Act for the Naturalization of Captain Christopher Gunman and others.
Naturalization of Horatio Woodhouse and others.	22 Cha. 2. c. 25 Pr.	11 April 1670
An Act for the Naturalizing of Horatio Woodhouse and others.

=== Sources ===
- Raithby, John, ed. (1963) [1819]. "22° Car. II.". Statutes of the Realm. Vol. 5: The Statutes of King Charles I and King Charles II (1625–1680). London: Dawsons. pp. 648–690 – via HathiTrust.
- Raithby, John, ed. (1819). Statutes of the Realm. Vol. 5: 1628-80 – via British History Online.
- Pickering, Danby, ed. (1763). "Anno vicesimo secundo Caroli II". The Statutes at Large. Vol. 8: From the Twelfth Year of King Charles II to the Last Year of King James II. Inclusive. Cambridge: Joseph Bentham. pp. 272–331 – via Internet Archive.
- Journals of the House of Commons. Vol. 9. London: His Majesty's Stationery Office. 1803. pp. 121–158 – via Google Books.
- Journal of the House of Lords. Vol. 12: 1666-1675. London: His Majesty's Stationery Office. 1830. pp. 287–351 – via British History Online.
- Chronological Table of and Index to the Statutes. Vol. 1: To the End of the Session 59 Vict. Sess. 2 (1895) (13th ed.). London: Her Majesty's Stationery Office. 1896. p. 72 – via Google Books.
- Chronological Table of the Statutes: Covering the Period from 1235 to the End of 1971. London: Her Majesty's Stationery Office. 1972. pp. 69–70. ISBN 978-0-11-840096-1 – via Google Books.
- "Chronological Tables of the Private and Personal Acts: Part 3 (1660–1680)". legislation.gov.uk. The National Archives.

== 22 & 23 Cha. 2 ==
The second part of the ninth session of the 2nd Parliament of King Charles II (the 'Cavalier Parliament'), from 24 October 1670 until 22 April 1671.

This session was also traditionally cited as 22 & 23 Car. 2, 22 & 23 Chas. 2, 22 & 23 C. 2 or 22 & 23 Car. 2. Stat. 1; it is listed in the "Chronological Table of the Statutes" as 22 & 23 Car. 2. Stat. 1.

=== Public acts ===
Short title	Citation	Royal assent
Long title
Maiming Act 1670 (repealed)	22 & 23 Cha. 2. c. 1	6 March 1671
An Act to prevent Malitious maiming and wounding. (Repealed by Offences Against the Person Act 1828 (9 Geo. 4. c. 31) and for India by Criminal Law (India) Act 1828 (9 Geo. 4. c. 74))
Extents Act 1670 (repealed)	22 & 23 Cha. 2. c. 2	6 March 1671
An Act for Continuance of a former Actt entituled "An Act to prevent Delayes in extending Statutes Judgements and Recognizances." (Note: Execution Act 1664 (16 & 17 Cha. 2. c. 5)) (Repealed by Statute Law Revision Act 1863 (26 & 27 Vict. c. 125))
Subsidy Act 1670 (repealed)	22 & 23 Cha. 2. c. 3	6 March 1671
An Act for granting a Subsidy to his Majestie for Supply of his Extraordinary Occasions. (Repealed by Statute Law Revision Act 1863 (26 & 27 Vict. c. 125))
Judgments, etc. Act 1670 (repealed)	22 & 23 Cha. 2. c. 4	6 March 1671
An Act for continuance of a former Act (Note: Arrest of Judgment Act 1664 (16 & 17 Cha. 2. c. 8)) to prevent Arrests of Judgements and superseding Executions. (Repealed by Statute Law Revision Act 1863 (26 & 27 Vict. c. 125))
Excise Act 1670 (repealed)	22 & 23 Cha. 2. c. 5	6 March 1671
An Act for an Additionall Excise upon Beere, Ale and other Liquors. (Repealed by Statute Law Revision Act 1863 (26 & 27 Vict. c. 125))
Wine Licences, etc. Act 1670 (repealed)	22 & 23 Cha. 2. c. 6	6 March 1671
An Act for revesting the Power of granting Wine Licences in his Majesty his Heires and Successors and for; setleing a Recompence on his Royall Highnesse in liew thereof. (Repealed by Criminal Statutes Repeal Act 1827 (7 & 8 Geo. 4. c. 27) and Statute Law Revision Act 1863 (26 & 27 Vict. c. 125))
Burning of Houses, etc. Act 1670 (repealed)	22 & 23 Cha. 2. c. 7	6 March 1671
An Act to prevent the malitious burning of Houses, Stackes of Corne and Hay and killing or maiming of Catle. (Repealed for England and Wales by Criminal Statutes Repeal Act 1827 (7 & 8 Geo. 4. c. 27) and for India by Criminal Law (India) Act 1828 (9 Geo. 4. c. 74))
Kidderminster Stuffs Act 1670 (repealed)	22 & 23 Cha. 2. c. 8	6 March 1671
An Act for the regulateing the makeing of Kidderminster Stuffes. (Repealed by Statute Law Revision Act 1863 (26 & 27 Vict. c. 125))
Duties on Law Proceedings Act 1670 (repealed)	22 & 23 Cha. 2. c. 9	22 April 1671
An Act for laying Impositions on Proceedings at Law. (Repealed by Statute Law Revision Act 1863 (26 & 27 Vict. c. 125))
Statute of Distribution (repealed)	22 & 23 Cha. 2. c. 10	22 April 1671
An Act for the better setling of Intestates Estates. (Repealed with savings by Administration of Estates Act 1925 (15 & 16 Geo. 5. c. 23))
Piracy Act 1670 (repealed)	22 & 23 Cha. 2. c. 11	22 April 1671
An Act to prevent the delivery up of Merchants Shipps, and for the Increase of good and serviceable shipping. (Repealed by Statute Law Revision Act 1966 (c. 5))
Measures (No. 2) Act 1670 (repealed)	22 & 23 Cha. 2. c. 12	22 April 1671
An Additionall Act for ascertaining the Measures of Corne and Salt. (Repealed by Statute Law Revision Act 1863 (26 & 27 Vict. c. 125))
Exportation Act 1670 (repealed)	22 & 23 Cha. 2. c. 13	22 April 1671
An Act for exporting of Beere Ale and Mum. (Repealed by Statute Law Revision Act 1863 (26 & 27 Vict. c. 125))
Rebuilding of London (Disputes) Act 1670 (repealed)	22 & 23 Cha. 2. c. 14	22 April 1671
An Act for determination of Differences touching Houses burnt or demolished within fower yeares since the late dreadfull Fire of London. (Repealed by Statute Law Revision Act 1948 (11 & 12 Geo. 6. c. 62))
Tithes in London After the Fire Act 1670 (repealed)	22 & 23 Cha. 2. c. 15	22 April 1671
An Act for the better Setlement of the Maintenance of the Parsons Vicars and Curates in the Parishes of the Citty of London burnt by the late dreadfull Fire there. (Repealed by Statute Law Revision Act 1948 (11 & 12 Geo. 6. c. 62))
Plague and Fire Relief Funds (Frauds, etc.) Act 1670 (repealed)	22 & 23 Cha. 2. c. 16	22 April 1671
An Act for the discovery of such as have defrauded the Poore of the Citty of London, of the Moneys given for their Releife at the times of the late Plague and Fire, and for recovery of the Arreares thereof. (Repealed by Statute Law Revision Act 1948 (11 & 12 Geo. 6. c. 62))
London Streets, Paving, Cleansing, etc. Act 1670 (repealed)	22 & 23 Cha. 2. c. 17	22 April 1671
An Act for the better paveing and cleansing the Streets and Sewers in and about the Citty of London. (Repealed by City of London Sewers Act 1851 (14 & 15 Vict. c. xci))
Poor Act 1670 (repealed)	22 & 23 Cha. 2. c. 18	22 April 1671
An Act for the better regulateing of Workehouses for setting the Poore on Worke. (Repealed by Statute Law Revision Act 1863 (26 & 27 Vict. c. 125))
Sale of Cattle Act 1670 (repealed)	22 & 23 Cha. 2. c. 19	22 April 1671
An Act to prevent Fraudes in the buying and selling of Cattell in Smithfeild and elsewhere. (Repealed by Statute Law Revision Act 1863 (26 & 27 Vict. c. 125))
Insolvent Debtors Relief Act 1670 (repealed)	22 & 23 Cha. 2. c. 20	22 April 1671
An Act for the Releife and Release of poore distressed Prisoners for Debt. (Repealed by Statute Law Revision Act 1863 (26 & 27 Vict. c. 125))
Taxation Act 1670 (repealed)	22 & 23 Cha. 2. c. 21	22 April 1671
An Act for takeing the Accompts of Sixty thousand pounds and other Moneys given to the loyall and indigent Officers. (Repealed by Statute Law Revision Act 1863 (26 & 27 Vict. c. 125))
Fines and Forfeitures Act 1670 (repealed)	22 & 23 Cha. 2. c. 22	22 April 1671
An Act for the better and more certaine Recovery of Fines and Forfeitures due to his Majestie. (Repealed by Statute Law Revision Act 1948 (11 & 12 Geo. 6. c. 62))
Navy Act 1670 (repealed)	22 & 23 Cha. 2. c. 23	22 April 1671
An Act to revive an Act, Entituled "An Act to prevent the disturbances of Seamen and others, and to preserve the Stores belonging to his Majestyes Navy Royall," (Note: Navy Act 1666 (18 & 19 Cha. 2. c. 12)) with some Alterations and Additions. (Repealed by Statute Law Revision Act 1863 (26 & 27 Vict. c. 125))
Fee Farm Rents Act 1670 (repealed)	22 & 23 Cha. 2. c. 24	22 April 1671
An Act for vesting certaine Fee-Farme Rents and other small Rents in Trustees. (Repealed by Crown Land Revenues, etc. Act 1786 (26 Geo. 3. c. 87))
Game Act 1670 (repealed)	22 & 23 Cha. 2. c. 25	22 April 1671
An Act for the better preservation of the Game, and for secureing Warrens not inclosed, and the severall Fishings of this Realme. (Repealed by Game Act 1831 (1 & 2 Will. 4. c. 32))
Tobacco Planting and Plantation Trade Act 1670 (repealed)	22 & 23 Cha. 2. c. 26	22 April 1671
An Act to prevent the planting of Tobacco in England, and for regulateing the Plantation Trade. (Repealed by Customs Law Repeal Act 1825 (6 Geo. 4. c. 105) and Statute Law Revision Act 1950 (14 Geo. 6. c. 6))
Post Office Revenues Act 1670 (repealed)	22 & 23 Cha. 2. c. 27 (Note: Also listed as 22 & 23 Cha. 2. c. 18 Pr.)	22 April 1671
An Act for explaining of a Proviso conteyned in an Act, entituled "An Act for settling the Profitts of ye Post-Office and Power of granteing Wine-Licences on His Royall Highnes ye Duke of Yorke and the Heyres Males of his Body." (Note: Settlement on Duke of York Act 1663 (15 Cha. 2. c. 14)) (Repealed by Statute Law Revision Act 1863 (26 & 27 Vict. c. 125))

=== Private acts ===
Short title	Citation	Royal assent
Long title
Duke of Albemarle's Estate Act 1670	22 & 23 Cha. 2. c. 1 Pr.	6 March 1671
An Act to enable Christopher Duke of Albemarle to re-convey several Manors and Lands mortgaged to George late Duke of Albemarle, his Father.
Enabling guardians to dispose of lands for benefit of Charles Earl of Shrewsbury and John Talbot (infants).	22 & 23 Cha. 2. c. 2 Pr.	6 March 1671
An Act to enable the Guardians of Charles Earl of Shrewsbury and John Talbott Esquire, Infants, to dispose of certain Manors, Lands, and Tenements, for the Benefit of the said Infants.
Lord Stafford's Estate Act 1670	22 & 23 Cha. 2. c. 3 Pr.	6 March 1671
An Act for confirming Agreements between the Lord Viscount of Stafford and his Lady, and their Customary Tenants and Copyholders.
Lord Norreys' Estate Act 1670	22 & 23 Cha. 2. c. 4 Pr.	6 March 1671
An Act to enable the making Conveyances of Part of the Estate of James Lord Norreys, during his Minority.
Enabling the Bishops of Bangor and St. Asaph to lease their lead mines for 21 years.	22 & 23 Cha. 2. c. 5 Pr.	6 March 1671
An Act to enable Robert Lord Bishop of Bangor and Isaac Lord Bishop of St. Asaph, and their respective Successors for ever, to let for One and Twenty Years all Lead Mines in their Soil.
Viscount Irwin's Estate Act 1670	22 & 23 Cha. 2. c. 6 Pr.	6 March 1671
An Act for empowering the Executors and Trustees of Henry late Lord Ingram, Viscount Irwin in the Kingdom of Scotland, deceased, to sell certain Lands, for the Payment of Debts and Legacies.
Granting Sir Philip Howard and Francis Watson sole use of an invention for the benefit of shipping.	22 & 23 Cha. 2. c. 7 Pr.	6 March 1671
An Act for granting to Sir Phillip Howard and Francis Watson Esquire the sole Use of a Manufacture, Art, or Invention, for the Benefit of Shipping.
Courtney's Estate Act 1670	22 & 23 Cha. 2. c. 8 Pr.	6 March 1671
An Act to enable Francis Courtney Esquire to join with Sir William Courtney his Father, in a Conveyance for settling their Estate.
Clifton's Estate Act 1670	22 & 23 Cha. 2. c. 9 Pr.	6 March 1671
An Act for the better Payment of the Debts of Sir Clifford Clifton Knight, deceased, and raising Portions for his Daughters.
Settling an agreement between Sir William Smith, Sir Thomas Hooke, German Poole and others.	22 & 23 Cha. 2. c. 10 Pr.	6 March 1671
An Act for settling an Agreement between Sir William Smith and Sir Thomas Hooke Baronets, German Poole, and others.
Fitz-James' Estate Act 1670	22 & 23 Cha. 2. c. 11 Pr.	6 March 1671
An Act to enable the Daughters and Coheirs of Sir John Fitzjames to join in a Sale of Lands, for Payment of his Debts.
Falmouth Church Act 1670	22 & 23 Cha. 2. c. 12 Pr.	6 March 1671
An Act for the better explaining of an Act made in this present Parliament, intituled, "An Act for the making of the Church erected at Falmouth a Parish Church, and no Part of Gluvias, or Chapelry of St. Budock." (Note: Falmouth Church Act 1664 (16 Cha. 2. c. 10 Pr.))
Hammond's Estate Act 1670	22 & 23 Cha. 2. c. 13 Pr.	6 March 1671
An Act to enable Elizabeth, Mary, and Letitia Hamond, to sell certain Lands, in the Bill mentioned.
Bill's Estate (Amendment) Act 1670	22 & 23 Cha. 2. c. 14 Pr.	6 March 1671
An Act for the rectifying a Mistake of Dates of Deeds, mentioned in an Act of Parliament, intituled, "An Act to enable John Bill Esquire to sell certain Lands, in Kent and Surrey." (Note: Bill's Estate Act 1670 (22 Cha. 2. c. 19 Pr.))
Hall's Estate Act 1670	22 & 23 Cha. 2. c. 15 Pr.	6 March 1671
An Act for an Exchange and Sale of Lands, for Payment of the Debts of Benedict Hall Esquire.
Knight's Estate	22 & 23 Cha. 2. c. 16 Pr.	6 March 1671
An Act for the settling the Manor of Portswood, and other Lands late of John Knight Gentleman, in the County, and Town and County, of Southampton, in John Parker Serjeant at Law, Mr. William Morgan, and William Blennerbasset, of London, Gent. to be sold, for Payment of Debts.
Vesting and settling the fee simple of certain Crown lands in Portsmouth which have been taken into and spoiled by new fortifications there.	22 & 23 Cha. 2. c. 17 Pr.	22 April 1671
An Act for vesting and settling the Fee Simple of certain Lands on His Majesty, His Heirs and Successors, which have been taken into, and spoiled by making New Fortifications about, the Town of Portsmouth.
Post Office Revenues Act 1670 (repealed)	22 & 23 Cha. 2. c. 18 Pr. (Note: Also listed as 22 & 23 Cha. 2. c. 27.)	22 April 1671
An Act for explaining of a Proviso conteyned in an Act, entituled "An Act for settling the Profitts of ye Post-Office and Power of granteing Wine-Licences on His Royall Highnes ye Duke of Yorke and the Heyres Males of his Body." (Note: Settlement on Duke of York Act 1663 (15 Cha. 2. c. 1 Pr.)) (Repealed by Statute Law Revision Act 1863 (26 & 27 Vict. c. 125))
Arundel House Act 1670	22 & 23 Cha. 2. c. 19 Pr.	22 April 1671
An Act for building Arundell House, and Tenements thereunto belonging.
Howard's Estate Act 1670	22 & 23 Cha. 2. c. 20 Pr.	22 April 1671
An Act to enable Charles Howard Esquire and Mary his Wife to levy a Fine, and suffer a Recovery, of their Estate in the Manor of Darking.
Booth's Estate Act 1670	22 & 23 Cha. 2. c. 21 Pr.	22 April 1671
An Act to enable Henry Booth Esquire to levy Fines, and suffer Recoveries.
Hackett's Estate Act 1670	22 & 23 Cha. 2. c. 22 Pr.	22 April 1671
An Act to enable Sir Andrewe Hackett Knight to settle a Portion of Money on Mary Hackett his Daughter.
Clarke's Estate Act 1670	22 & 23 Cha. 2. c. 23 Pr.	22 April 1671
An Act for settling the Manor of Shabbington, for Payment of the Debts of Sir William Clarke Baronet.
Ogle's Estate Act 1670	22 & 23 Cha. 2. c. 24 Pr.	22 April 1671
An Act to enable Trustees to sell the Manors, Lands, and Leases, of Sir Thomas Ogle Knight, deceased, for raising a Portion and present Maintenance for his Daughter and Heir, and Payment of his Debts.
Foss Dyke and Witham Navigation Act 1670	22 & 23 Cha. 2. c. 25 Pr.	22 April 1671
An Act for improving the Navigation between the Town of Boston and the River Trent.
River Wey Navigation Act 1670	22 & 23 Cha. 2. c. 26 Pr.	22 April 1671
An Act for settling and preserving the Navigation of the River Wey, in the County of Surrey.
Ross Vicarage and Parsonage Act 1670	22 & 23 Cha. 2. c. 27 Pr.	22 April 1671
An Act for uniting the Vicarage and Parsonage of Rosse, in the County of Hereford.
Christ Church and St. Saviour's Parishes Southwark Act 1670	22 & 23 Cha. 2. c. 28 Pr.	22 April 1671
An Act for making the Manor of Paris Garden a Parish, and to enable the Parishioners of St. Saviour's Southwarke to raise a Maintenance for Ministers, and for Repair of their Church.
Herlackenden's Estate Act 1670	22 & 23 Cha. 2. c. 29 Pr.	22 April 1671
An Act for Sale of Part of the Estate of Thomas Herlackenden Esquire, for Satisfaction of a Debt due to His Majesty.
Sams' Charity Lands Act 1670	22 & 23 Cha. 2. c. 30 Pr.	22 April 1671
An Act for settling Lands intended by John Sams for charitable Uses.

=== Sources ===
- Raithby, John, ed. (1963) [1819]. "22° & 23° Car. II.". Statutes of the Realm. Vol. 5: The Statutes of King Charles I and King Charles II (1625–1680). London: Dawsons. pp. 691–751 – via HathiTrust.
- Raithby, John, ed. (1819). Statutes of the Realm. Vol. 5: 1628-80 – via British History Online.
- Pickering, Danby, ed. (1763). "Anno vicesimo secundo & tertio Caroli II". The Statutes at Large. Vol. 8: From the Twelfth Year of King Charles II to the Last Year of King James II. Inclusive. Cambridge: Joseph Bentham. pp. 331–388 – via Internet Archive.
- Journal of the House of Commons. Vol. 9. London: His Majesty's Stationery Office. 1803. pp. 158–244 – via Google Books.
- Journal of the House of Lords. Vol. 12: 1666-1675. London: His Majesty's Stationery Office. 1830. pp. 351–516 – via British History Online.
- Chronological Table of and Index to the Statutes. Vol. 1: To the End of the Session 59 Vict. Sess. 2 (1895) (13th ed.). London: Her Majesty's Stationery Office. 1896. pp. 72–73 – via Google Books.
- Chronological Table of the Statutes: Covering the Period from 1235 to the End of 1971. London: Her Majesty's Stationery Office. 1972. p. 70. ISBN 978-0-11-840096-1 – via Google Books.
- "Chronological Tables of the Private and Personal Acts: Part 3 (1660–1680)". legislation.gov.uk. The National Archives.

== See also ==
- List of acts of the Parliament of England
