= List of acts of the Parliament of England from 1691 =

This is a list of acts of the Parliament of England for the year 1691.

For acts passed during the period 1707–1800, see the list of acts of the Parliament of Great Britain. See also the list of acts of the Parliament of Scotland, and the list of acts of the Parliament of Ireland.

For acts passed from 1801 onwards, see the list of acts of the Parliament of the United Kingdom. For acts of the devolved parliaments and assemblies in the United Kingdom, see the list of acts of the Scottish Parliament, the list of acts of the Northern Ireland Assembly, and the list of acts and measures of Senedd Cymru; see also the list of acts of the Parliament of Northern Ireland.

For medieval statutes, etc. that are not considered to be acts of Parliament, see the list of English statutes.

See also the List of ordinances and acts of the Parliament of England, 1642–1660 for ordinances and acts passed by the Long Parliament and other bodies without royal assent, and which were not considered to be valid legislation following the Restoration in 1660.

The number shown after each act's title is its chapter number. Acts are cited using this number, preceded by the years of the reign during which the relevant parliamentary session was held; thus the Union with Ireland Act 1800 is cited as "39 & 40 Geo. 3. c. 67", meaning the 67th act passed during the session that started in the 39th year of the reign of George III and which finished in the 40th year of that reign. The modern convention is to use Arabic numerals in citations (thus "41 Geo. 3" rather than "41 Geo. III"). Acts of the last session of the Parliament of Great Britain and the first session of the Parliament of the United Kingdom are both cited as "41 Geo. 3".

Acts passed by the Parliament of England did not have a short title; however, some of these acts have subsequently been given a short title by acts of the Parliament of the United Kingdom, such as the Short Titles Act 1896 (59 & 60 Vict. c. 14).

Acts passed by the Parliament of England were deemed to have come into effect on the first day of the session in which they were passed. Because of this, the years given in the list below may in fact be the year before a particular act was passed.

== 3 Will. & Mar. ==
The third session of the 2nd Parliament of William and Mary, which met from 22 October 1691 until 12 April 1692.

This session was also traditionally cited as 3 Will. & Mary, 3 Gul. & Mar., 3 Gul. et Mar. or 3 W. & M.

=== Public acts ===
Short title	Citation	Royal assent
Long title
Taxation Act 1691 (repealed)	3 Will. & Mar. c. 1	24 December 1691
An Act for granting to Their Majesties certain Impositions upon Beere Ale and other Liquors for One Year. (Repealed by Statute Law Revision Act 1867 (30 & 31 Vict. c. 59))
Oaths of Supremacy, etc., Ireland Act 1691 (repealed)	3 Will. & Mar. c. 2	24 December 1691
An Act for the Abrogating the Oath of Supremacy in Ireland and Appointing other Oaths. (Repealed by Promissory Oaths Act 1871 (34 & 35 Vict. c. 48))
Tithes Act 1691 (repealed)	3 Will. & Mar. c. 3	24 December 1691
An Act for the better Ascertaining the Tythes of Hemp and Flax. (Repealed by Statute Law Revision Act 1867 (30 & 31 Vict. c. 59))
Prize Act 1691 (repealed)	3 Will. & Mar. c. 4	24 December 1691
An Act for Preserving Two Ships Lading of Bay Salt taken as Prize for the Benefitt of Their Majesties Navy. (Repealed by Statute Law Revision Act 1867 (30 & 31 Vict. c. 59))
Land Tax Act 1691 (repealed)	3 Will. & Mar. c. 5	31 December 1691
An Act for Granting an Aid to Their Majesties of the Summe of Sixteene hundred fifty one thousand seven hundred and two pounds eighteen shillings towards the Carrying on a Vigorous Warre against France. (Note: The Nine Years' War.) (Repealed by Statute Law Revision Act 1867 (30 & 31 Vict. c. 59))
Poll Tax Act 1691 (repealed)	3 Will. & Mar. c. 6	24 February 1692
An Act for raiseing money by a Poll payable quarterly for One year for the carrying on a vigorous War against France. (Repealed by Statute Law Revision Act 1867 (30 & 31 Vict. c. 59))
Militia Act 1691 (repealed)	3 Will. & Mar. c. 7	24 February 1692
An Act for raising the Militia of this Kingdom for the Year One thousand six hundred ninety and two although the Months Pay formerly advanced be not repaid. (Repealed by Statute Law Revision Act 1867 (30 & 31 Vict. c. 59))
Cattle Act 1691 (repealed)	3 Will. & Mar. c. 8	24 February 1692
An Act for the Encouragement of the breeding and feeding of Cattell. (Repealed by Statute Law Revision Act 1867 (30 & 31 Vict. c. 59))
Benefit of Clergy, etc. Act 1691 (repealed)	3 Will. & Mar. c. 9	24 February 1692
An Act to take away Clergy from some Offenders and to bring other to Punishment. (Repealed for England and Wales by Criminal Statutes Repeal Act 1827 (7 & 8 Geo. 4. c. 27) and for India by Criminal Law (India) Act 1828 (9 Geo. 4. c. 74))
Deer Stealers Act 1691 (repealed)	3 Will. & Mar. c. 10	24 February 1692
An Act for the more effectual Discovery and Punishment of Deer Stealers. (Repealed by Stealing of Deer Act 1776 (16 Geo. 3. c. 30))
Poor Relief Act 1691 (repealed)	3 Will. & Mar. c. 11	24 February 1692
An Act for the better Explanation and supplying the Defects of the former Laws for the Settlement of the Poor. (Repealed by Poor Law Act 1927 (17 & 18 Geo. 5. c. 14))
Highways, etc. Act 1691 (repealed)	3 Will. & Mar. c. 12	24 February 1692
An Act for the better repairing and amending the Highways and for settling the Rates of Carriage of Goods. (Repealed by Statute Law Revision Act 1867 (30 & 31 Vict. c. 59))
Correspondence with Enemies Act 1691 (repealed)	3 Will. & Mar. c. 13	24 February 1692
An Act against corresponding with Their Majesties Enemies. (Repealed by Statute Law Revision Act 1867 (30 & 31 Vict. c. 59))
Fraudulent Devises Act 1691 (repealed)	3 Will. & Mar. c. 14	24 February 1692
An Act for Relief of Creditors against Fraudulent Devises. (Repealed by Debts Recovery Act 1830 (11 Geo. 4 & 1 Will. 4. c. 47))
Taxation (Wine and Spirits) Act 1691 (repealed)	3 Will. & Mar. c. 15	24 February 1692
An Act for the better ordering and collecting the Duty upon Low Wines and Strong Waters and preventing the Abuses therein. (Repealed by Statute Law Revision Act 1867 (30 & 31 Vict. c. 59))

=== Private acts ===
Short title	Citation	Royal assent
Long title
Making a 12-year lease made by Earl and Countess of Aylesbury, which was determinable on their deaths, absolute for 12 years.	3 Will. & Mar. c. 1 Pr.	24 December 1691
An Act for the making a Twelve Years Lease, made by the Earl and Countess of Ailesbury for Payment of Debts (which was determinable upon their Deaths), to have Continuance absolutely for those Twelve Years.
Bishop of Ely's Estate Act 1691	3 Will. & Mar. c. 2 Pr.	24 December 1691
An Act for the settling a Fee Farm Rent of One Hundred Pounds per Annum upon the Bishop of Ely and his Successors, to be issuing out of Hatton Garden, in the County of Midd'x, and the Messuages thereupon erected; and for settling and assuring the same, subject to the said Rent, upon Christopher Lord Viscount Hatton, his Heirs and Assigns, for ever.
Sir Thomas Putt's Estate Act 1691	3 Will. & Mar. c. 3 Pr.	24 December 1691
An Act to enable the Executors and Trustees of Sir Thomas Putt Baronet, deceased, to lease several Messuages, Lands, Tenements, and Hereditaments, during the Minority of Sir Thomas Putt Baronet, Son and Heir of the said Sir Thomas Putt, towards the Payment of Five Hundred Pounds apiece Legacies to his Three Sisters, Margarett, Ursula, and Susanna Putt, as also the Debts of the said Sir Thomas Putt the Father.
Naturalization of Sir Martin Beckman Act 1691	3 Will. & Mar. c. 4 Pr.	24 December 1691
An Act for naturalizing Sir Martin Beckman and others.
William Stydolph's Estate Act 1691	3 Will. & Mar. c. 5 Pr.	24 December 1691
An Act for Sale of the Manor and Lands in Wittering, in the County of North'ton, and the Advowson of the Church of Wittering aforesaid, late the Inheritance of William Stydolfe Esquire, deceased, late Father of Sigismond Stydolfe Esquire.
Settling a jointure on Jane Matthews.	3 Will. & Mar. c. 6 Pr.	24 December 1691
An Act for settling a Jointure upon Jane the Wife of Colonel Edward Mathews, Daughter of Sir Thomas Armstrong deceased.
George Mountague's Estate Act 1691	3 Will. & Mar. c. 7 Pr.	24 December 1691
An Act for the vesting and settling divers Lands in Gloucestershire in Trustees, to be sold, for the paying of the remaining Portions to the Children of George Mountagu Esquire, deceased.
Richard Roberts' Estate Act 1691	3 Will. & Mar. c. 8 Pr.	31 December 1691
An Act to vest certain Messuages, Lands, and Tenements, in Thorpe Langton and elsewhere, in the County of Leicester, in Trustees, to be sold, for Payment of the Debts of Richard Roberts.
Nicholas Martyn's Estate Act 1691	3 Will. & Mar. c. 9 Pr.	24 February 1692
An Act for Sale of the Manor of Manworthy, with its Appurtenances, in the County of Devon, being the Lands and Estate of Nicholas Martyn Esquire, by Trustees herein after named, for the Payment of the Debts of the said Nicholas Martyn.
Henry Drax's Estate Act 1691	3 Will. & Mar. c. 10 Pr.	24 February 1692
An Act to vest the Estate late of Henry Drax Esquire, deceased, in Thomas Shatterden Gentleman; and to enable the said Thomas Shatterden and others, to whom the said Estate is devised, to make a Jointure.
Sir Dudley Cullum's Estate Act 1691	3 Will. & Mar. c. 11 Pr.	24 February 1692
An Act for enabling Sir Dudley Cullum Baronet to raise Monies, to pay his Brother and Sisters Portions.
Maurice Shelton's Estate Act 1691	3 Will. & Mar. c. 12 Pr.	24 February 1692
An Act to enable the Sale of several Lands, for the Payment of the Debts and Legacies of Maurice Shelton and others; and for settling other Lands instead of them.
Edward Smith's Estate Act 1691	3 Will. & Mar. c. 13 Pr.	24 February 1692
An Act to enable Trustees to sell the Estate of Edward Smith Esquire, deceased, to raise Money for the Payment of his Debts, and to make Provision for his Children who are Infants.
Sir Thomas Burton's Estate Act 1691	3 Will. & Mar. c. 14 Pr.	24 February 1692
An Act for the enabling of Sir Thomas Burton Baronet to sell Lands, for Payment of Debts.
William Davile's Estate Act 1691	3 Will. & Mar. c. 15 Pr.	24 February 1692
An Act to enable William Davile to sell some Lands, for Payment of Debts.
Enabling the Earl of Winchelsea to settle a jointure on any wife he marries during his minority.	3 Will. & Mar. c. 16 Pr.	24 February 1692
An Act for the enabling the Right Honourable Charles Earl of Winchelsea to settle a Jointure upon any Wife he shall marry during his Minority.
Better performance of Richard Campion's will.	3 Will. & Mar. c. 17 Pr.	24 February 1692
An Act for the better enabling the Trustees and Executors of Richard Campion deceased to perform his Will.
Lord Waldgrave's Estate Act 1691	3 Will. & Mar. c. 18 Pr.	24 February 1692
An Act to enable Trustees of the Right Honourable James Lord Waldegrave to make Leases, and grant Copyhold Estates, for the Payment of the Arrears of Annuities of Henry Lord Waldegrave his Father, deceased.
Francis Moore's Estate Act 1691	3 Will. & Mar. c. 19 Pr.	24 February 1692
An Act for enabling Francis Moore Esquire to sell the Manor of Bayhouse, and Lands in West Thorocke, in the County of Essex; and to purchase and settle other Lands in Lieu thereof.
Manors of Albury and North Mimms Act 1691	3 Will. & Mar. c. 20 Pr.	24 February 1692
An Act for the enfranchising several Copyhold Lands and Tenements, holden of the Manors of Albury and North Mims, in the County of Hertford.
Earl of Salisbury's Estate Act 1691	3 Will. & Mar. c. 21 Pr.	24 February 1692
An Act for the better securing the Portions, Debts, and Legacies, given and owing by James late Earl of Salisbury.
John Cripps' Estate Act 1691	3 Will. & Mar. c. 22 Pr.	24 February 1692
An Act for Sale of the Estate of John Cripps Gentleman, in the County of Kent; and for settling another Estate, of greater Value, in Lieu thereof, to the same Uses.
William Molineux's Estate Act 1691	3 Will. & Mar. c. 23 Pr.	24 February 1692
An Act to vest certain Lands of William Molyneaux Gentleman in Trustees, for raising the Sum of Two Thousand Pounds, for paying the Portions to his Younger Brother and Sisters, pursuant to a Decree in the Court of Chancery.
Naturalization of Meinhardt, Duke of Leinster Act 1691	3 Will. & Mar. c. 24 Pr.	24 February 1692
An Act for naturalizing of Mainhardt Duke of Leinster, and others.
Philip, Lord Stanhopp's marriage settlement enabling.	3 Will. & Mar. c. 25 Pr.	24 February 1692
An Act for the enabling Phillip Lord Stanhope, Son and Heir Apparent of the Right Honourable Phillip Earl of Chesterfeild, together with the said Earl, to make a Jointure and Settlement, upon the Marriage of the said Phillip Lord Stanhope.
Henry Halsted's Estate Act 1691	3 Will. & Mar. c. 26 Pr.	24 February 1692
An Act to enable Henry Halsted to make a Lease, for the Improvement of his Prebend of Ealdstreet, in the Church of St. Paul, in London.
Bishopric of London's Estate Act 1691	3 Will. & Mar. c. 27 Pr.	24 February 1692
An Act to enable the Bishop of London, and Trustees, to sell the Manor of Bushley, in the County of Worcester, Part of the Bishopric of London; and to purchase other Lands, to be annexed to the said Bishopric, for the Improvement thereof.
William and Jenkin Vaughan Estates Act 1691	3 Will. & Mar. c. 28 Pr.	24 February 1692
An Act for the settling of certain Messuages, Mills, Lands, and Tenements, in the County of Merioneth, upon certain Trustees, to be sold or mortgaged, towards the Payment of the Debts of William Vaughan and Jenkin Vaughan Esquires, deceased.
Vincent Grantham's Estate Act 1691	3 Will. & Mar. c. 29 Pr.	24 February 1692
An Act for the enabling Vincent Grantham Esquire to lease Part of his Manor of Golthoe in Lincolneshire, for the raising Monies, to pay Portions and Debts charged thereupon.
Naturalization of Marquis of Monpavillan and Others Act 1691	3 Will. & Mar. c. 30 Pr.	24 February 1692
An Act for naturalizing of Armand Nompar de Caumaunt, commonly called Marquis of Monpovillan, and others.
Earl of Suffolk's Estate Act 1691	3 Will. & Mar. c. 31 Pr.	24 February 1692
An Act to enable the Trustees of James late Earl of Suffolke to sell the Manor of Hadstock in Essex, for discharging several other Manors and Lands of the said late Earl from Five Thousand Pounds, Remainder of Ten Thousand Pounds by him formerly charged thereon.
More speedy payment of debts of Elizabeth Curtis and performance of a related agreement between Charles Curtis and Edward Earl according to a Chancery decree.	3 Will. & Mar. c. 32 Pr.	24 February 1692
An Act for the more speedy Payment of the Debts of Elizabeth Curtis Widow, late deceased, and Performance of an Agreement touching the same, made between Charles Curtis in his Life-time, and Edward Earle, according to a Decree in the High Court of Chancery.
Lincolnshire, Berkshire and Devon Estates Act 1691	3 Will. & Mar. c. 33 Pr.	24 February 1692
An Act for the vesting several Manors, Lands, and Rents, in the Counties of Lincolne, Berks, and Devon, in Trustees, to be sold, for the buying other Manors and Lands, to be settled for the same or the like Uses as those to be sold are now settled.
Charles Pelham's Estate Act 1691	3 Will. & Mar. c. 34 Pr.	24 February 1692
An Act for securing, out of some of the Manors, Lands, Tenements, and Hereditaments, of Charles Pelham, of Brockelsby, in the County of Lincolne, Esquire, the Sum of Five Thousand Pounds, with Interest, unto Anne Pelham, Eldest Daughter of the said Charles.
Philip Hildeyard's Estate Act 1691	3 Will. & Mar. c. 35 Pr.	24 February 1692
An Act for the better vesting and settling the Manor of East Horseley, in Surrey, in Trustees, to be sold, for Payment of the Debts of Phillip Hyldeyard Esquire.
George Vernon Land in Evesham, Surrey Act 1691	3 Will. & Mar. c. 36 Pr.	24 February 1692
An Act for the better assuring to George Vernon, and his Heirs and his Assigns, Four Acres of Land in Evisham, in the County of Surrey.
Shadwell Waterworks Act 1691 (repealed)	3 Will. & Mar. c. 37 Pr.	24 February 1692
An Act for incorporating the Proprietors of the Water-works in the Parish of St. Paul's Shadwell, in the County of Middl'x; and for the encouraging, carrying on, and settling, the said Water-works. (Repealed by East London Waterworks (No. 2) Act 1852 (15 & 16 Vict. c. clxiv))
Sir William Halford's Estate Act 1691	3 Will. & Mar. c. 38 Pr.	24 February 1692
An Act to vest divers Manors, Lands, and Tenements, in the County of Leicester, in Trustees, to be sold, for the Payment of the Debts and Legacies of Sir William Halford Knight deceased, and for Payment of the other Debts of Sir William Halford now living, prior to his Marriage Settlement with the Lady Frances his now Wife.
Barbary and John Newton's Estate Act 1691	3 Will. & Mar. c. 39 Pr.	24 February 1692
An Act for settling the Manor and Lordship of King's Bromley, and other the Messuages, Lands, Tenements, and Hereditaments, of Barbary Newton Widow, Relict of Samuel Newton, late of the Island of Barbadoes, in America, Esquire, deceased, and John Newton Esquire, Son and Heir of the said Samuel by the said Barbary.
Sir Edwin Sadler's Estate Act 1691	3 Will. & Mar. c. 40 Pr.	24 February 1692
An Act to enable Sir Edwin Sadleir Baronet to sell Lands, to pay his Debts.
Duke of Grafton's Estate Act 1691	3 Will. & Mar. c. 41 Pr.	24 February 1692
An Act for vesting certain Pieces or Parcels of Ground, in the Parishes of St. James and St. Martin's in the Feilds, late the Estate of Henry Duke of Grafton, deceased, in Trustees, to be sold.
John Keble's Estate Act 1691	3 Will. & Mar. c. 42 Pr.	24 February 1692
An Act to enable John Keble Gentleman to sell certain Lands in Stow Market, in the County of Suffolke; and to settle other Lands, of greater Value, to the same Uses.

=== Sources ===
- Raithby, John, ed. (1963) [1819]. "3° Gul. & Mar.". Statutes of the Realm. Vol. 6: The Statutes of King James II, and King William and Queen Mary (1685–1694). London: Dawsons. pp. 251–322 – via HathiTrust.
- Raithby, John, ed. (1819). Statutes of the Realm. Vol. 6: 1685-94 – via British History Online.
- Pickering, Danby, ed. (1764). "Anno tertio Gulielmi & Mariæ". The Statutes at Large. Vol. 9: From the First Year of K. William and Q. Mary to Eighth Year of K. William III – 1688 to 1695–96. Cambridge: Joseph Bentham. pp. 128–137 – via Internet Archive.
- Pickering, Danby, ed. (1764). "Anno tertio Gulielmi & Mariæ". The Statutes at Large. Vol. 9: From the First Year of K. William and Q. Mary to Eighth Year of K. William III – 1688 to 1695–96. Cambridge: Joseph Bentham. pp. 128–137 – via Internet Archive.
- Pickering, Danby, ed. (1764). "Anno tertio & quarto Gulielmi & Mariæ". The Statutes at Large. Vol. 9: From the First Year of K. William and Q. Mary to Eighth Year of K. William III – 1688 to 1695–96. Cambridge: Joseph Bentham. pp. 137–158 – via Internet Archive.
- Pickering, Danby, ed. (1764). "Anno tertio & quarto Gulielmi & Mariæ". The Statutes at Large. Vol. 9: From the First Year of K. William and Q. Mary to Eighth Year of K. William III – 1688 to 1695–96. Cambridge: Joseph Bentham. pp. 137–158 – via Internet Archive.
- Journals of the House of Commons. Vol. 10. London: His Majesty's Stationery Office. 1803. pp. 538–695 – via Google Books.
- Chronological Table of and Index to the Statutes. Vol. 1: To the End of the Session 59 Vict. Sess. 2 (1895) (13th ed.). London: Her Majesty's Stationery Office. 1896. pp. 75–76 – via Google Books.
- "Chronological Tables of the Private and Personal Acts: Part 4 (1685–1694)". legislation.gov.uk. The National Archives.

== See also ==
- List of acts of the Parliament of England
