= Continuance of Laws Act 1766 =

Act of the Parliament of Great Britain

- Act of Parliament
- Parliament of Great Britain
- Long title: An Act to continue several Laws therein mentioned, relating to the allowing a Drawback of the Duties upon the Exportation of Copper Bars imported; to the Encouragement of the Silk Manufactures, and for taking off several Duties on Merchandize exported, and reducing other Duties; to the Premium upon Masts, Yards, and Bowsprits, Tar, Pitch, and Turpentine; to the encouraging Growth of Coffee in His Majesty's Plantations in America; to the securing the Duties on Foreign-made Sail Cloth, and charging Foreign-made Sails with a Duty; and for enlarging the Times limited for executing and performing several Provisions, Powers, and Directions, in Acts of this Session of Parliament.
- Citation: 6 Geo. 3. c. 44
- Territorial extent: Great Britain

Dates
- Royal assent: 6 June 1766
- Commencement: 17 December 1765 (Note: Start of session.)
- Repealed: 21 August 1871
Other legislation
Amends	See § Continued enactments
Repealed by	Statute Law Revision Act 1871
Relates to	See Expiring laws continuance acts

Status: Repealed

Text of statute as originally enacted

The Continuance of Laws Act 1766 (6 Geo. 3. c. 44) was an act of the Parliament of Great Britain that continued various older acts.

== Background ==
In the United Kingdom, acts of Parliament remain in force until expressly repealed. Many acts of parliament, however, contained time-limited sunset clauses, requiring legislation to revive enactments that had expired or to continue enactments that would otherwise expire.

== Provisions ==
=== Continued enactments ===
Section 1 of the act continued section 19 of the Trade with Africa Act 1697 (9 Will. 3. c. 26) "for allowing during a limited time a drawback of the duties upon the exportation of copper bars imported", as revived and continued by the Poor Act 1712 (12 Ann. c. 18), and the provision in section 5 of the 1712 act that provided that drawback on copper would be allowed on imports from the East Indies and the coast of Barbary, as continued by the Continuance of Laws, etc. Act 1726 (13 Geo. 1. c. 27), the Making of Sail Cloth, etc. Act 1741 (15 Geo. 2. c. 35), the Continuance of Laws, etc. Act 1753 (26 Geo. 2. c. 32) and the Continuance of Laws Act 1758 (32 Geo. 2. c. 23), from the expiration of those enactments until the end of the next session of parliament after 24 June 1774.

Section 2 of the act continued the Silk Subsidies, Various Duties, Import of Furs, etc. Act 1721 (8 Geo. 1. c. 15) as relates to the encouragement of the silk manufactures of the kingdom, as continued by the Continuance of Laws, etc. Act 1724 (11 Geo. 1. c. 29), the Unlawful Games Act 1728 (2 Geo. 2. c. 28), the Continuance of Laws Act 1734 (8 Geo. 2. c. 18), the Making of Sail Cloth, etc. Act 1741 (15 Geo. 2. c. 35), the Stamps Act 1746 (20 Geo. 2. c. 45) , the Continuance of Laws, etc. Act 1753 (26 Geo. 2. c. 32) and the Continuance of Laws Act 1758 (32 Geo. 2. c. 23), from the expiration of those enactments until the end of the next session of parliament after 24 June 1774.

Section 3 of the act continued the Preservation of Woods, America Act 1728 (2 Geo. 2. c. 35) as relates "to the premiums upon malts, yards, and bowsprits, tar, pitch, and turpentine", as continued by the Continuance of Laws, etc. Act 1739 (13 Geo. 2. c. 28), the Continuance of Laws Act 1750 (24 Geo. 2. c. 52), the Growth of Coffee, etc. Act 1751 (25 Geo. 2. c. 35) and the Continuance of Laws Act 1758 (32 Geo. 2. c. 23), from the expiration of the act until the end of the next session of parliament after 24 June 1774.

Section 4 of the act continued the Growth of Coffee Act 1731 (5 Geo. 2. c. 24), as continued by the Continuance of Laws Act 1737 (11 Geo. 2. c. 18) the Growth of Coffee Act 1745 (19 Geo. 2. c. 23), the Growth of Coffee, etc. Act 1751 (25 Geo. 2. c. 35) and the Continuance of Laws Act 1758 (32 Geo. 2. c. 23), from the expiration of the act until the end of the next session of parliament after 24 June 1774, except as relates "to the importation and exportation of foreign coffee into, and out from, the British colonies and plantations in America".

Section 5 of the act continued the Sail Cloth Act 1745 (19 Geo. 2. c. 27), as continued by the Continuance of Laws, etc. Act 1753 (26 Geo. 2. c. 32) and the Continuance of Laws Act 1758 (32 Geo. 2. c. 23), until the end of the next session of parliament after 24 June 1774.

Section 6 of the act provided that provisions, powers, authorities, matters, and things required to be executed by any act passed during the present session of parliament would be deemed valid and effectual if executed within five weeks after the end of the present session, as if they had been executed within the time originally limited by such acts.

== Subsequent developments ==
The Select Committee on Temporary Laws, Expired or Expiring, appointed in 1796, inspected and considered all temporary laws, observing irregularities in the construction of expiring laws continuance acts, making recommendations and emphasising the importance of the Committee for Expired and Expiring Laws.

The whole act was repealed by section 1 of, and the schedule to, the Statute Law Revision Act 1871 (34 & 35 Vict. c. 116), which came into force on 21 August 1871.
