= Continuance of Laws, etc. Act 1753 =

Act of the Parliament of Great Britain

- Act of Parliament
- Parliament of Great Britain
- Long title: An Act for continuing several Laws, relating to the Punishment of Persons going armed or disguised, in Defiance of the Laws of Customs or Excise; to the Drawback of the Duties upon Copper Bars exported; and to the Duties upon Foreign-made Sail Cloth; and also for Encouragement of the Silk Manufactures; and for taking off several Duties on Merchandizes exported; and for encouraging the Trade of the Sugar Colonies in America; and for vacating the Security for the Duty on Salt lost in any River, or in Port, after shipped, and for enlarging the Time for proving the Loss of Salt; and for Relief of Masters of Ships, with respect to the Importation of Soap and Candles contrary to an Act made in the Twenty-third Year of His Majesty's Reign;[i] and also for the more effectual Payment of the Bounties upon British-made Sail Cloth; and to empower the Commissioners of the Treasury to direct the Payment of the Bounty to John Henniker and others, upon Four Ships fitted out for the Whale Fishery, and lost in The Greenland Seas; and also to Philip How and others, upon Two Ships employed in the said Fishery, notwithstanding some of the Forms required by Law in fitting out such Ships were not complied with.
- Citation: 26 Geo. 2. c. 32
- Territorial extent: Great Britain

Dates
- Royal assent: 7 June 1753
- Commencement: 11 January 1753 (Note: Start of session.)
- Repealed: 15 July 1867
Other legislation
Amends	See § Continued enactments
Repealed by	Statute Law Revision Act 1867
Relates to	See Expiring laws continuance acts

Status: Repealed

Text of statute as originally enacted

The Continuance of Laws, etc. Act 1753 (26 Geo. 2. c. 32) was an act of the Parliament of Great Britain that continued various older enactments.

== Background ==
In the United Kingdom, acts of Parliament remain in force until expressly repealed. Many acts of parliament, however, contained time-limited sunset clauses, requiring legislation to revive enactments that had expired or to continue enactments that would otherwise expire.

== Provisions ==
=== Continued enactments ===
Section 1 of the act continued the Offences against Customs or Excise Act 1745 (19 Geo. 2. c. 34) "as relates to the further punishment of persons going armed or disguised in defiance of the laws of customs or excise, and to the relief of officers of the customs in informations upon seizure" until the end of the next session of parliament after 24 June 1758.

Section 2 of the act continued section 19 of the Trade with Africa Act 1697 (9 Will. 3. c. 19) (Note: This is the citation in The Statutes of the Realm.) "for allowing during a limited time a drawback of the duties upon the exportation of copper bars imported", as revived and continued by section 5 of the Poor Act 1712 (12 Ann. c. 18) (Note: This is the citation in The Statutes of the Realm.) and as continued by the Continuance of Laws, etc. Act 1726 (13 Geo. 1. c. 27) and the Making of Sail Cloth, etc. Act 1741 (15 Geo. 2. c. 35), and the provision in section 5 of the 1712 act that provided that drawback on copper would be allowed on imports from the East Indies and the coast of Barbary, from the expiration of those enactments until the end of the next session of parliament after 24 June 1758.

Section 3 of the act continued the Sail Cloth Act 1745 (19 Geo. 2. c. 27) until the end of the next session of parliament after 24 June 1758.

Section 4 of the act continued the several clauses of the Silk Subsidies, Various Duties, Import of Furs, etc. Act 1721 (8 Geo. 1. c. 15), as continued by the Continuance of Laws, etc. Act 1724 (11 Geo. 1. c. 29), the Unlawful Games Act 1728 (2 Geo. 2. c. 28), the Continuance of Laws Act 1734 (8 Geo. 2. c. 18), the Making of Sail Cloth, etc. Act 1741 (15 Geo. 2. c. 35) and the Stamps Act 1746 (20 Geo. 2. c. 45), from the expiration of those enactments until the end of the next session of parliament after 24 March 1758.

Section 5 of the act continued the Trade of Sugar Colonies Act 1732 (6 Geo. 2. c. 13), as continued by the Continuance of Laws Act 1737 (11 Geo. 2. c. 18) and the Growth of Coffee Act 1745 (19 Geo. 2. c. 23), until the end of the next session of parliament after 24 June 1758.

Section 6 of the act extended the provisions of the Duties on Salt Act 1703 (2 & 3 Ann. c. 16) (Note: This is the citation in The Statutes of the Realm.) and the Taxation Act 1716 (3 Geo. 1. c. 4), providing that salt or rock salt exporters who lost their shipments could obtain a certificate from justices of the peace entitling them to buy an equivalent quantity of salt without paying duties, similar to provisions for salt lost at sea or in transit along rivers, upon providing proper proof of loss.

Section 7 of the act amended the Taxation, etc. Act 1705 (4 & 5 Ann. c. 23) (Note: This is the citation in The Statutes of the Realm.), providing that exporters of salt or rock salt who lost their shipments could receive a certificate from justices of the peace upon proof of loss, which would discharge their security for duties paid and entitle them to reimbursement, with the time limit for making such proof being extended to two years due to previous impracticability of the shorter timeframe.

Section 8 of the act extended the provisions of section 27 of the Supply, etc. Act 1749 (23 Geo. 2. c. 21), providing that that ship masters or officers facing penalties for illegal importation of candles, soap, or starch could detain the wages of mariners who committed such offences without the knowledge of the officers, allowing those wages to be used toward payment of the penalties imposed on the masters.

Section 9 of the act extended the provisions of section 26 of the Supply, etc. Act 1749 (23 Geo. 2. c. 21), providing that bounties due since 1 June 1750 and those that would become due on the exportation of British-made sail cloth would be charged upon and paid out of parts of the old subsidy applicable to the payment of incidents, as the previous provision for payment had proved ineffectual.

Section 10 of the act provided that, pursuant to the Whale Fishery Act 1732 (6 Geo. 2. c. 33) and the Whale Fishery Act 1748 (22 Geo. 2. c. 45), the Treasury commissioners were empowered to direct payment of whale fishery bounties to John Hennicker, Henry Bird the elder, Henry Bird the younger, and Conrad Lang of London for their four ships (Merry Jacks, Sword Fish, Revolution, and Neptune) that were unavoidably lost at sea in 1752 while engaged in the Greenland whale fishery, despite the ships not returning to the kingdom as normally required.

Section 11 of the act provided that, pursuant to the Whale Fishery Act 1732 (6 Geo. 2. c. 33) and the Whale Fishery Act 1748 (22 Geo. 2. c. 45), the Treasury commissioners were empowered to direct payment of whale fishery bounties to Philip How and others for their ships Argyle and Campletoun which returned to the kingdom with three whales in 1752 but were unable to obtain the proper certificates for payment due to omissions or mistakes in making the required affidavits and giving security.

== Subsequent developments ==
The Select Committee on Temporary Laws, Expired or Expiring, appointed in 1796, inspected and considered all temporary laws, observing irregularities in the construction of expiring laws continuance acts, making recommendations and emphasising the importance of the Committee for Expired and Expiring Laws.

The whole act was repealed by section 1 of, and the schedule to, the Statute Law Revision Act 1867 (30 & 31 Vict. c. 59), which came into force on 15 July 1867.
