= Trade with Africa Act 1697 =

Act of the Parliament of England

- Act of Parliament
- Parliament of England
- Long title: An Act to settle the trade to Africa.
- Citation: 9 Will. 3 c. 26 (Note: This is the citation in The Statutes of the Realm.); 9 & 10 Will. 3. c. 26 (Note: This is the citation in The Statutes at Large.)
- Territorial extent: England and Wales

Dates
- Royal assent: 5 July 1698
- Commencement: 24 June 1698 (Note: Section 1.)
- Repealed: 15 July 1867
Other legislation
Amended by	Poor Act 1712; Continuance of Laws, etc. Act 1726; Making of Sail Cloth, etc. Act 1741; Continuance of Laws, etc. Act 1753; Continuance of Laws Act 1758; Continuance of Laws Act 1766; Continuance of Laws, etc. Act 1774
Repealed by	Statute Law Revision Act 1867

Status: Repealed

Text of statute as originally enacted

The Trade with Africa Act 1697 (9 Will. 3. c. 26), also known as An Act to settle the Trade to Africa, was an act of the Parliament of England to officially revoke the monopoly enjoyed by the Royal African Company (RAC) on English trade with Africa, with included the Atlantic slave trade. Instead the act introduced taxation on those involved in the "triangular trade" whereby merchants would be liable to pay ten per cent tax for the maintenance of the forts and castles between Cape Mount and the Cape of Good Hope which belonged to the RAC. The new regulations came into effect on 24 June 1698.

== Text ==
The act begins with the following:

Whereas the Trade to Africa is highly beneficial and advantagious to this Kingdom and to the Plantations and Colonies thereunto belonging and whereas Forts and Castles are undoubtedly necessary for the preservation and well carrying on the said Trade
And whereas the Forts and Castles now on the said Coast of Africa have been, and now are maintained at them sole Cost and Charge of the present Royal African Company of England towards which Charge it is most reasonable that all Persons tradeing to such Parts of the said Coast of Africa as are herein after, limited and appointed should contribute
Be it therefore enacted by the Kings most Excellent Majesty and by and with the Advice and Consent of the Lords Spiritual and Temporal and Commons in Parliament assembled and by the Authority of the same That from and after the Four and twentieth Day of June in the Year One thousand six hundred ninety & eight the said Royal African Company their Successors and Assigns by and with their Stock and Duties herein after appointed to be paid shall maintain support and defend all such Forts and Castles as the said African Company now have in their Possession or shall hereafter purchase or erect for the Preservation Improvement and well carrying on the said Trade and those Forts and Castles from time to time and at all times hereafter as occasion shall require shall supply with Men Artillery Ammunition and Provision and all other Necessaries and incident Charges whatsoever.

== Effects ==
Among other provisions, the act opened the African trade to all English merchants who paid a ten per cent levy to the Royal African Company on all goods exported from Africa.

The company was unable to withstand competition on the terms imposed by the act and in 1708 became insolvent, surviving until 1750 in a state of much reduced activity.

== Subsequent developments ==
Section 19 of the act was continued until the end of the next session of parliament after 14 years from the expiration of that enactments by section 4 of the Poor Act 1712 (12 Ann. c. 18) (Note: This is the citation in The Statutes of the Realm.).

Section 19 of the act "for allowing a drawback of the duties upon the exportation of copper bars imported" was continued until the end of the next session of parliament after 14 years from the expiration of that enactment by section 1 of the Continuance of Laws, etc. Act 1726 (13 Geo. 1. c. 27).

Section 19 of the act "for allowing a drawback of the duties upon the exportation of copper bars imported" was continued until the end of the next session of parliament after 14 years from the expiration of that enactment by section 4 of the Making of Sail Cloth, etc. Act 1741 (15 Geo. 2. c. 35).

Section 19 of the act "for allowing during a limited time a drawback of the duties upon the exportation of copper bars imported" was continued until the end of the next session of parliament after 24 June 1758 by section 2 of the Continuance of Laws, etc. Act 1753 (26 Geo. 2. c. 32).

Section 19 of the act "for allowing during a limited time a drawback of the duties upon the exportation of copper bars imported" was continued until the end of the next session of parliament after 24 June 1766 by section 1 of the Continuance of Laws Act 1758 (32 Geo. 2. c. 23).

Section 19 of the act "for allowing during a limited time a drawback of the duties upon the exportation of copper bars imported" was continued until the end of the next session of parliament after 24 June 1774 by section 1 of the Continuance of Laws Act 1766 (6 Geo. 3. c. 44).

Section 19 of the act "for allowing during a limited time a drawback of the duties upon the exportation of copper bars imported" was continued until the end of the next session of parliament after 24 June 1781 by section 1 of the Continuance of Laws, etc. Act 1774 (14 Geo. 3. c. 86).

The whole act was repealed by section 1 of, and the schedule to, the Statute Law Revision Act 1867 (30 & 31 Vict. c. 59), which came into force on 15 July 1867.
