= Stamps Act 1746 =

Act of the Parliament of Great Britain

- Act of Parliament
- Parliament of Great Britain
- Long title: An Act to continue several Laws relating to the Manufactures of Sail Cloth and Silk, to give further Time for the Payment of Duties omitted to be paid for the Indentures or Contracts of Clerks and Apprentices, and for better securing the Payment of the said Duties, and declaring, That Prize Ships, lawfully condemned, shall be deemed British-built Ships, and for allowing Prize Goods to be landed, and secured in proper Warehouses, without Payment of any Duty, until it can be determined whether they are sit for Exportation of Home Consumption.
- Citation: 20 Geo. 2. c. 45
- Territorial extent: Great Britain

Dates
- Royal assent: 17 June 1747
- Commencement: 18 November 1746 (Note: Start of session.)
- Repealed: 1 January 1871
Other legislation
Amends	See § Continued enactments
Repealed by	Inland Revenue Repeal Act 1870
Relates to	See Expiring laws continuance acts

Status: Repealed

Text of statute as originally enacted

The Stamps Act 1746 (20 Geo. 2. c. 45) was an act of the Parliament of Great Britain that continued various older enactments.

== Provisions ==
=== Continued enactments ===
Section 1 of the act continued the Sail Cloth Manufacture Act 1712 (12 Ann. c. 16), (Note: This is the citation in The Statutes of the Realm.) as continued by the Continuance of Laws Act 1718 (5 Geo. 1. c. 25), the Continuance of Laws, etc. Act 1723 (10 Geo. 1. c. 17) and the Continuance of Laws Act 1734 (8 Geo. 2. c. 18), from the expiration of the act until the end of the next session of parliament after 1 June 1754.

Section 2 of the act continued the Silk Subsidies, Various Duties, Import of Furs, etc. Act 1721 (8 Geo. 1. c. 15) as relates to the encouragement of the silk manufactures of the kingdom, as continued by the Continuance of Laws, etc. Act 1724 (11 Geo. 1. c. 29), the Unlawful Games Act 1728 (2 Geo. 2. c. 28), the Continuance of Laws Act 1734 (8 Geo. 2. c. 18) and the Making of Sail Cloth, etc. Act 1741 (15 Geo. 2. c. 35), from the expiration of the act until the end of the next session of parliament after 1 June 1754.

Section 3 of the act continued the last two clauses of the Continuance of Laws Act 1722 (9 Geo. 1. c. 8) for more effectual preventing frauds in mixing silks with stuffs to be exported, as continued by the Continuance of Laws Act 1734 (8 Geo. 2. c. 18), until the end of the next session of parliament after 1 June 1754.

Section 4 of the act extended the provisions of the Stamps Act 1709 (8 Ann. c. 9), the Stamps Act 1710 (9 Ann. 15) and the Stamps Act 1744 (18 Geo. 2. c. 22), providing that masters who had previously neglected to pay stamp duties for clerks, apprentices, or servants could, before 29 September 1747, pay double rates and duties to have such indentures stamped and made legally valid, with clerks and apprentices thereby enabled to practice their trades as if duties had been paid on time, and any penalties previously incurred would be discharged.

Section 5 of the act provided that after 24 June 1747, masters who neglected to pay stamp duties would be liable for double rates and duties, but upon payment of these double rates within two years after apprenticeship termination, such indentures would be legally valid, and clerks, apprentices, or servants could practice their trades as if duties had been paid on time, with all prior penalties discharged.

Section 6 of the act provided that if a clerk, apprentice, or servant whose master had incurred double stamp duties could, with credible witnesses, request payment from their master, and if refused, could pay the duties themselves within three months and then demand reimbursement from their master, with the right to recover the money through legal action in the courts at Westminster.

Section 7 of the act provided that every clerk, apprentice, or servant would still avail themselves of the time benefit regarding their service as if they had been properly indentured, regardless of any reassignment or transfer to another master.

Section 8 of the act provided that if prosecution commenced against a master for penalties under former acts, the clerk, apprentice, or servant of such master could, upon payment of double rates and duties within two years after the end of their service, be qualified to follow their respective trades, with their indentures being legally valid despite anything in former acts.

Section 9 of the act provided that prize ships or vessels lawfully condemned would be deemed as British-built ships to all intents and purposes, entitling them to the same rights, liberties, privileges and advantages as British-built ships, and subjecting them to the same rules and regulations, notwithstanding any law, custom, or usage to the contrary.

Section 10 of the act provided that goods and merchandise captured from enemies during the war with France and Spain could be exported directly from warehouses to foreign ports without paying customs duties, provided they were declared by captors within three months of landing, with sufficient security given to ensure such goods would not be re-landed in Great Britain, or else be forfeited to the Crown.

== Subsequent developments ==
The whole act was repealed by section 2 of, and the schedule to, the Inland Revenue Repeal Act 1870 (33 & 34 Vict. c. 99), which came into force on 1 January 1871.
