= Making of Sail Cloth, etc. Act 1741 =

Act of the Parliament of Great Britain

- Act of Parliament
- Parliament of Great Britain
- Long title: An Act to continue several Laws, for the Encouragement of the making of Sail Cloth in Great Britain, and of the Silk Manufactures of this Kingdom; and for allowing a Drawback on the Exportation of Copper Bars; and to explain a Clause of an Act made in the last Session of Parliament, to prohibit the Exportation of Corn, and other Things therein mentioned; and to give further Time for the Payment of Duties omitted to be paid for the Indentures and Contracts of Clerks and Apprentices.
- Citation: 15 Geo. 2. c. 35
- Territorial extent: Great Britain

Dates
- Royal assent: 15 July 1742
- Commencement: 1 December 1741 (Note: Start of session.)
- Repealed: 15 July 1867
Other legislation
Amends	See § Continued enactments
Repealed by	Statute Law Revision Act 1867
Relates to	See Expiring laws continuance acts

Status: Repealed

Text of statute as originally enacted

The Making of Sail Cloth, etc. Act 1741 (15 Geo. 2. c. 35) was an act of the Parliament of Great Britain that continued various older acts.

== Background ==
In the United Kingdom, acts of Parliament remain in force until expressly repealed. Many acts of parliament, however, contained time-limited sunset clauses, requiring legislation to revive enactments that had expired or to continue enactments that would otherwise expire.

== Provisions ==
=== Continued enactments ===
Section 1 of the act continued the Sail Cloth Manufacture Act 1712 (12 Ann. c. 12) (Note: This is the citation in The Statutes of the Realm.), as continued by the Continuance of Laws Act 1718 (5 Geo. 1. c. 25), the Continuance of Laws, etc. Act 1723 (10 Geo. 1. c. 17) and the Continuance of Laws Act 1734 (8 Geo. 2. c. 18), from the expiration of the act until the end of the next session of parliament after 25 March 1747.

Section 2 of the act continued the Silk Subsidies, Various Duties, Import of Furs, etc. Act 1721 (8 Geo. 1. c. 15) as relates to the encouragement of the silk manufactures of the kingdom, as continued by the Continuance of Laws, etc. Act 1724 (11 Geo. 1. c. 29) and the Unlawful Games Act 1728 (2 Geo. 2. c. 28), from the expiration of the act until the end of the next session of parliament after 1 June 1747.

Section 3 of the act continued the last two clauses of the Continuance of Laws Act 1722 (9 Geo. 1. c. 8) for more effectual preventing frauds in mixing silks with stuffs to be exported, as continued by the Continuance of Laws Act 1734 (8 Geo. 2. c. c. 15) from the expiration of the act until the end of the next session of parliament after 1 June 1747.

Section 4 of the act continued the continued the clause in section 1 of the Trade with Africa Act 1697 (9 Will. 3. c. 26) "for allowing a drawback of the duties upon the exportation of copper bars imported", as revived and continued by the Poor Act 1712 (12 Ann. c. 18), and the provision in section 5 of the 1712 act that provided that drawback on copper would be allowed on imports from the East Indies and the coast of Barbary, as continued by the Continuance of Laws, etc. Act 1726 (13 Geo. 1. c. 27), until the end of the next session of parliament after 14 years from the expiration of those enactments.

Section 5 of the act amended the Exportation Act 1740 (14 Geo. 2), providing that the act was meant and intended to extend to all corn and malt that was ground, as well as whole corn.

== Subsequent developments ==
The Select Committee on Temporary Laws, Expired or Expiring, appointed in 1796, inspected and considered all temporary laws, observing irregularities in the construction of expiring laws continuance acts, making recommendations and emphasising the importance of the Committee for Expired and Expiring Laws.

The whole act was repealed by section 1 of, and the schedule to, the Statute Law Revision Act 1867 (30 & 31 Vict. c. 59), which came into force on 15 July 1867.
