= List of acts of the Parliament of Great Britain from 1753 =

This is a complete list of acts of the Parliament of Great Britain for the year 1753.

For acts passed until 1707, see the list of acts of the Parliament of England and the list of acts of the Parliament of Scotland. See also the list of acts of the Parliament of Ireland.

For acts passed from 1801 onwards, see the list of acts of the Parliament of the United Kingdom. For acts of the devolved parliaments and assemblies in the United Kingdom, see the list of acts of the Scottish Parliament, the list of acts of the Northern Ireland Assembly, and the list of acts and measures of Senedd Cymru; see also the list of acts of the Parliament of Northern Ireland.

The number shown after each act's title is its chapter number. Acts are cited using this number, preceded by the year(s) of the reign during which the relevant parliamentary session was held; thus the Union with Ireland Act 1800 is cited as "39 & 40 Geo. 3. c. 67", meaning the 67th act passed during the session that started in the 39th year of the reign of George III and which finished in the 40th year of that reign. Note that the modern convention is to use Arabic numerals in citations (thus "41 Geo. 3" rather than "41 Geo. III"). Acts of the last session of the Parliament of Great Britain and the first session of the Parliament of the United Kingdom are both cited as "41 Geo. 3".

Acts passed by the Parliament of Great Britain did not have a short title; however, some of these acts have subsequently been given a short title by acts of the Parliament of the United Kingdom (such as the Short Titles Act 1896).

Before the Acts of Parliament (Commencement) Act 1793 came into force on 8 April 1793, acts passed by the Parliament of Great Britain were deemed to have come into effect on the first day of the session in which they were passed. Because of this, the years given in the list below may in fact be the year before a particular act was passed.

== 26 Geo. 2 ==
The sixth session of the 10th Parliament of Great Britain, which met from 11 January 1753 until 7 June 1753.

This session was also traditionally cited as 26 G. 2.

=== Public acts ===
Short title	Citation	Royal assent
Long title
National Debt Act 1753 (repealed)	26 Geo. 2. c. 1	8 February 1753
An Act for continuing and granting to His Majesty certain Duties upon Malt, Mum, Cyder, and Perry, for the Service of the Year One Thousand Seven Hundred and Fifty-three; and for enlarging the Time limited by an Act of the last Session of Parliament, (Note: National Debt (No. 2) Act 1751 (25 Geo. 2. c. 27)) for subscribing Annuities after the Rate of Three Pounds per Centum per Annum into the Joint Stock of Annuities therein mentioned. (Repealed by Statute Law Revision Act 1870 (33 & 34 Vict. c. 69))
Game Act 1753 (repealed)	26 Geo. 2. c. 2	8 March 1753
An Act to amend an Act made in the Eighth Year of the Reign of His late Majesty King George the First, intituled, "An Act for the better Recovery of the Penalties inflicted upon Persons who destroy the Game," (Note: Game Act 1721 (8 Geo. 1. c. 19)) by enlarging the Time within which Suits and Actions are to be brought by Force of the said Act. (Repealed by Game Act 1831 (1 & 2 Will. 4. c. 32))
Salt Duties Act 1753 (repealed)	26 Geo. 2. c. 3	8 March 1753
An Act for continuing the Duties upon Salt and upon Red and White Herrings, for the Purposes therein mentioned. (Repealed by Statute Law Revision Act 1867 (30 & 31 Vict. c. 59))
Land Tax Act 1753 (repealed)	26 Geo. 2. c. 4	8 March 1753
An Act for granting an Aid to His Majesty, by a Land Tax, to be raised in Great Britain, for the Service of the Year One Thousand Seven Hundred and Fifty-three. (Repealed by Statute Law Revision Act 1867 (30 & 31 Vict. c. 59))
Mutiny Act 1753 (repealed)	26 Geo. 2. c. 5	8 March 1753
An Act for punishing Mutiny and Desertion; and for the better Payment of the Army and their Quarters. (Repealed by Statute Law Revision Act 1867 (30 & 31 Vict. c. 59))
Quarantine Act 1753 (repealed)	26 Geo. 2. c. 6	17 April 1753
An Act to oblige Ships more effectually to perform their Quarantine; and for the better preventing the Plague being brought from Foreign Parts into Great Britain or Ireland, or the Isles of Guernsey, Jersey, Alderney, Sark, or Man. (Repealed for England and Wales and Scotland by Quarantine Act 1800 (39 & 40 Geo. 3. c. 80) and for Northern Ireland by Statute Law Revision Act 1950 (14 Geo. 6. c. 6))
Small Debts, Boston Act 1753 (repealed)	26 Geo. 2. c. 7	17 April 1753
An Act for the more easy and speedy Recovery of small Debts, within the Borough of Boston and Skirbeck Quarter, and the Parishes of Boston and Skirbeck, in the County of Lincoln. (Repealed by Boston (Lincolnshire) Court of Requests Act 1807 (47 Geo. 3 Sess. 2. c. i))
Importation Act 1753 (repealed)	26 Geo. 2. c. 8	17 April 1753
An Act for opening the Port of Exeter, for the Importation of Wool and Woollen Yarn from Ireland. (Repealed by Statute Law Revision Act 1867 (30 & 31 Vict. c. 59))
Herring Fishery Act 1753 (repealed)	26 Geo. 2. c. 9	17 April 1753
An Act to explain, amend, and render more effectual, an Act made in the Twenty-third Year of the Reign of His present Majesty, intituled, "An Act for the Encouragement of the British White Herring Fishery;" (Note: Herring Fishery Act 1749 (23 Geo. 2. c. 24)) and for regulating the said Fishery according to the Calendar now in Use; and for other Purposes therein mentioned. (Repealed by Statute Law Revision Act 1867 (30 & 31 Vict. c. 59))
Bridlington Piers Act 1753 (repealed)	26 Geo. 2. c. 10	17 April 1753
An Act for enlarging the Time, and continuing the Duties, granted by several Acts of Parliament, for Repairs of the Piers of Bridlington, alias Burlington, in the County of York; and for making the said Acts more effectual. (Repealed by Bridlington Piers and Harbour Act 1837 (7 Will. 4 & 1 Vict. c. cx))
Exportation Act 1753 (repealed)	26 Geo. 2. c. 11	17 April 1753
An Act for permitting the Exportation of Wool and Woollen or Bay Yarn, from any Port in Ireland, to any Port in Great Britain. (Repealed by Statute Law Revision Act 1867 (30 & 31 Vict. c. 59))
Customs Act 1753 (repealed)	26 Geo. 2. c. 12	15 May 1753
An Act to prevent Wines imported into any of the Out-Ports of this Kingdom being afterwards brought into the Port of London, or Parts adjacent, without paying the London Duty. (Repealed by Statute Law Revision Act 1867 (30 & 31 Vict. c. 59))
Tobacco Trade, etc. Act 1753 (repealed)	26 Geo. 2. c. 13	15 May 1753
An Act for more effectually preventing the fraudulent Removal of Tobacco by Land or Water, and for the Ease of the fair Trader in Tobacco; and for ascertaining the Rates payable for the Portage of certain Letters; and for amending and explaining the Laws relating to the Sale of Spirituous Liquors by Retail. (Repealed by Statute Law Revision Act 1867 (30 & 31 Vict. c. 59))
Justices' Clerks' Fees Act 1753 (repealed)	26 Geo. 2. c. 14	15 May 1753
An Act for settling and ascertaining the Fees to be taken by Clerks to Justices of the Peace. (Repealed by Criminal Justice Administration Act 1914 (4 & 5 Geo. 5. c. 58))
Exportation (No. 2) Act 1753 (repealed)	26 Geo. 2. c. 15	15 May 1753
An Act for allowing Interest upon certain Debentures, for the Bounty granted on the Exportation of Corn. (Repealed by Statute Law Revision Act 1867 (30 & 31 Vict. c. 59))
South Sea Company Act 1753 (repealed)	26 Geo. 2. c. 16	15 May 1753
An Act for reducing the Number of Directors of the Corporation of the Governor and Company of Merchants of Great Britain trading to The South-Seas and other Parts of America; and for encouraging the Fishery; and for regulating the Election of the Governors and Directors of the said Company. (Repealed by Statute Law Revision Act 1867 (30 & 31 Vict. c. 59))
Window Duties Act 1753 (repealed)	26 Geo. 2. c. 17	15 May 1753
An Act for the more effectual levying of the Duties upon Windows or Lights in that Part of Great Britain called Scotland. (Repealed by House Tax Act 1803 (43 Geo. 3. c. 161))
Levant Trade Act 1753 (repealed)	26 Geo. 2. c. 18	15 May 1753
An Act for enlarging and regulating the Trade into The Levant Seas. (Repealed by Dissolution of Levant Company Act 1825 (6 Geo. 4. c. 33))
Stealing Shipwrecked Goods Act 1753 (repealed)	26 Geo. 2. c. 19	15 May 1753
An Act for enforcing the Laws against Persons who shall steal or detain shipwrecked Goods; and for the Relief of Persons suffering Losses thereby. (Repealed by Merchant Shipping Repeal Act 1854 (17 & 18 Vict. c. 120))
Linen Manufacture (Scotland) Act 1753 (repealed)	26 Geo. 2. c. 20	15 May 1753
An Act for encouraging and improving the Manufactory of Linen in The Highlands of Scotland. (Repealed by Statute Law Revision Act 1867 (30 & 31 Vict. c. 59))
Silk Manufactures Act 1753 (repealed)	26 Geo. 2. c. 21	15 May 1753
An Act for encouraging the Silk Manufactures of this Kingdom; and for securing the Duties payable upon the Importation of Velvets, Wrought Silks, and Silks mixed with other Materials, not manufactured in Great Britain. (Repealed by Customs Law Repeal Act 1825 (6 Geo. 4. c. 105))
British Museum Act 1753 (repealed)	26 Geo. 2. c. 22	7 June 1753
An Act for purchasing of the Museum, or Collection, of Sir Hans Sloane, and of the Harleian Collection of Manuscripts; and for providing One general Repository for the better Reception and more convenient Use of the said Collections, and of the Cottonian Library, and of the Additions thereto. (Repealed by British Museum Act 1963 (c. 24))
National Debt (No. 2) Act 1753 (repealed)	26 Geo. 2. c. 23	7 June 1753
An Act for granting to His Majesty a certain Sum of Money, therein mentioned, out of the Sinking Fund; and for applying certain Surplus Monies remaining in the Exchequer, for the Service of the Year One Thousand Seven Hundred and Fifty-three; and for the further appropriating the Supplies granted in this Session of Parliament; and for enlarging the Time limited by an Act of the last Session of Parliament, for subscribing Annuities after the Rate of Three Pounds per Centum per Annum, and Three Pounds Ten Shillings per Centum per Annum, into the Joint Stock of Annuities; and for other Purposes therein mentioned. (Repealed by Statute Law Revision Act 1870 (33 & 34 Vict. c. 69))
Papists Act 1753 (repealed)	26 Geo. 2. c. 24	7 June 1753
An Act for allowing further Time for Enrolment of Deeds and Wills made by Papists; and for Relief of Protestant Purchasers, Devisees, and Lessees. (Repealed by Statute Law Revision Act 1867 (30 & 31 Vict. c. 59))
Discovery of Longitude at Sea Act 1753 (repealed)	26 Geo. 2. c. 25	7 June 1753
An Act to render more effectual an Act made in the Twelfth Year of the Reign of Her late Majesty Queen Anne, intituled, "An Act for providing a publick Reward for such Person or Persons as shall discover the Longitude at Sea," (Note: Discovery of Longitude at Sea Act 1713 (13 Ann. c. 14)) with regard to the making Experiments of Proposals made for discovering the Longitude; and to enlarge the Number of Commissioners for putting in Execution the said Act. (Repealed by Discovery of Longitude at Sea, etc. Act 1818 (58 Geo. 3. c. 20))
Naturalization of Jews Act 1753 (repealed)	26 Geo. 2. c. 26	7 June 1753
An Act to permit Persons professing the Jewish Religion to be naturalized by Parliament; and for other Purposes therein mentioned. (Repealed by Naturalization of Jews Act 1754 (27 Geo. 2. c. 1))
Justices Act 1753 (repealed)	26 Geo. 2. c. 27	7 June 1753
An Act to confirm certain Acts and Orders, made by Justices of the Peace, being of the Quorum, notwithstanding any Defect in not expressing therein that such Justices of the Peace are of the Quorum. (Repealed by Statute Law Revision Act 1948 (11 & 12 Geo. 6. c. 62))
Highways Act 1753 (repealed)	26 Geo. 2. c. 28	7 June 1753
An Act for the preventing of the Inconveniencies and Dangers that may arise from the present Methods of digging Gravel, Sand, Stone, Chalk, and other Materials, on the several Commons and Waste Grounds within this Kingdom, for the Repair of the Highways, and for other Purposes. (Repealed by Highways (No. 2) Act 1766 (7 Geo. 3. c. 42))
Disarming of the Highlands, etc. Act 1753 (repealed)	26 Geo. 2. c. 29	7 June 1753
An Act to explain, amend, and continue, the Provisions made by Two Acts of Parliament, of the Nineteenth (Note: Disarming the Highlands, etc. Act 1745 (19 Geo. 2. c. 39)) and Twenty-first (Note: Cattle Theft (Scotland) Act 1747 (21 Geo. 2. c. ?)) Years of His Majesty's Reign, for the more effectual disarming The Highlands in Scotland; and to make Provision for the more speedy ascertaining the lawful Debts or Claims upon the Lands and Hereditaments that sometime belonged to Alexander Robertson of Strowan, (Note: Alexander Robertson of Struan.) which, with other Forfeited Estates, are, by an Act of the Twenty-fifth Year of His Majesty's Reign, (Note: Crown Lands (Forfeited Estates) Act 1751 (25 Geo. 2. c. 41)) annexed to the Crown unalienable. (Repealed by Statute Law Revision Act 1867 (30 & 31 Vict. c. 59))
Highways and Turnpike Roads Act 1753 (repealed)	26 Geo. 2. c. 30	7 June 1753
An Act for the Amendment and Preservation of the Publick Highways and Turnpike Roads of this Kingdom; and for the more effectual Execution of the Laws relating thereto. (Repealed by Turnpike Roads Act 1766 (7 Geo. 3. c. 40))
Alehouses Act 1753 (repealed)	26 Geo. 2. c. 31	7 June 1753
An Act for regulating the Manner of licensing Alehouses, in that Part of Great Britain called England; and for the more easy convicting Persons selling Ale and other Liquors without License. (Repealed by Alehouse Act 1828 (9 Geo. 4. c. 61))
Continuance of Laws, etc. Act 1753 (repealed)	26 Geo. 2. c. 32	7 June 1753
An Act for continuing several Laws, relating to the Punishment of Persons going armed or disguised, in Defiance of the Laws of Customs or Excise; to the Drawback of the Duties upon Copper Bars exported; and to the Duties upon Foreign-made Sail Cloth; and also for Encouragement of the Silk Manufactures; and for taking off several Duties on Merchandizes exported; and for encouraging the Trade of the Sugar Colonies in America; and for vacating the Security for the Duty on Salt lost in any River, or in Port, after shipped, and for enlarging the Time for proving the Loss of Salt; and for Relief of Masters of Ships, with respect to the Importation of Soap and Candles contrary to an Act made in the Twenty-third Year of His Majesty's Reign; (Note: Supply, etc. Act 1749 (23 Geo. 2. c. 21)) and also for the more effectual Payment of the Bounties upon British-made Sail Cloth; and to empower the Commissioners of the Treasury to direct the Payment of the Bounty to John Henniker and others, upon Four Ships fitted out for the Whale Fishery, and lost in The Greenland Seas; and also to Philip How and others, upon Two Ships employed in the said Fishery, notwithstanding some of the Forms required by Law in fitting out such Ships were not complied with. (Repealed by Statute Law Revision Act 1867 (30 & 31 Vict. c. 59))
Clandestine Marriages Act 1753 or the Marriage Act 1753 or Lord Hardwicke's Marriage Act (repealed)	26 Geo. 2. c. 33	7 June 1753
An Act for the better preventing of Clandestine Marriage. (Repealed by Marriage Act 1823 (4 Geo. 4. c. 76))
Cattle Distemper, Vagrancy, Marshalsea Prison, etc. Act 1753 (repealed)	26 Geo. 2. c. 34	7 June 1753
An Act to explain, amend, and continue, several Laws, more effectually to prevent the spreading of the Distemper which now rages amongst the Horned Cattle in this Kingdom; for the more effectual paying the Expenses of passing Vagrants; for obviating Doubts that may arise, touching the keeping of Prisoners until the Prison of The Marshalsea of the Court of King's Bench shall be re-built or re-paired; and for amending so much of the Act of the Twenty-fourth of His present Majesty, (Note: Calendar (New Style) Act 1750 (24 Geo. 2. c. 23)) for regulating the Commencement of the Year, and for correcting the Calendar now in Use, as relates to the Time of electing publick Officers of the City of Chester. (Repealed by Statute Law Revision Act 1867 (30 & 31 Vict. c. 59) and Statute Law Revision Act 1953 (2 & 3 Eliz. 2. c. 5))
River Dee Navigation Act 1753	26 Geo. 2. c. 35	15 May 1753
An Act for confirming an Agreement, entered into between the Company of Proprietors of the Undertaking for recovering and preserving the Navigation of the River Dee and Sir John Glynne Baronet, Lord of the Manor of Hawarden, and several Freeholders and Occupiers of Land within the said Manor; and for explaining and amending Three several Acts of Parliament, of the Sixth, (Note: River Dee Navigation Act 1732 (6 Geo. 2. c. 30)) Fourteenth, (Note: River Dee Navigation Act 1740 (14 Geo. 2. c. 8)) and Seventeenth (Note: River Dee Navigation Act 1743 (17 Geo. 2. c. 28)) Years of His present Majesty's Reign, for recovering and preserving the Navigation of the said River Dee.
Edinburgh Buildings Act 1753 or the Edinburgh Improvement Act 1753	26 Geo. 2. c. 36	15 May 1753
An Act for erecting several Publick Buildings in the City of Edinburgh; and to empower the Trustees therein mentioned to purchase Lands for that Purpose; and also for widening and enlarging the Streets of the said City, and certain Avenues leading thereunto.
Cumberland Roads Act 1753	26 Geo. 2. c. 37	8 March 1753
An Act for repairing the Road leading from the Town of Penrith, in the County of Cumberland, by Hutton Hall, over Skelton and Castlesowerby Pastures and Sebraham Bridge, to Chalk Beck, in the said County; and also the Road which branches and separates from the same Road upon Castlesowerby Pasture aforesaid, and leads from thence through Hesket, otherwise Hesket-New-Market, to Caldbeck, in the said County.
Stone Church, Stafford Act 1753	26 Geo. 2. c. 38	8 March 1753
An Act to enable the Parishioners of the Parish of Stone, (Note: St. Michael's Church, Stone.) in the County of Stafford, to rebuild the Church of the said Parish.
Bewdley Roads Act 1753 (repealed)	26 Geo. 2. c. 39	8 March 1753
An Act for repairing and widening several Roads leading from the Town of Bewdley, in the County of Worcester, to the several Places therein mentioned, in the Counties of Worcester and Salop respectively. (Repealed by Bewdley Roads Act 1821 (1 & 2 Geo. 4. c. lxxxix) and Annual Turnpike Acts Continuance Act 1875 (38 & 39 Vict. c. cxciv))
Carlisle and Eamont Bridge Road Act 1753 (repealed)	26 Geo. 2. c. 40	8 March 1753
An Act for repairing the Roads from the City of Carlisle to the Town of Penrith, in the County of Cumberland, and from the said Town of Penrith to Emont Bridge, which divides the Counties of Cumberland and Westmorland. (Repealed by Road from Carlisle to Penrith and to Eamont Bridge Act 1830 (11 Geo. 4 & 1 Will. 4. c. cx))
Bedfordshire Roads Act 1753	26 Geo. 2. c. 41	8 March 1753
An Act for continuing and making more effectual Three Acts of Parliament, passed in the Ninth (Note: Dunstable Highways Act 1710 (9 Ann. c. 34)) and Twelfth (Note: Dunstable Highways Act 1713 (13 Ann. c. 29)) Years of the Reign of Her late Majesty Queen Anne, and the Fifth Year of the Reign of His present Majesty, (Note: Bedford Roads Act 1731 (5 Geo. 2. c. 26)) for repairing the Highways between Dunstable and Hockliffe, in the County of Bedford; and also for repairing the Road from the Sign of The White Horse to the Sign of The King's Arms in Hockliffe aforesaid.
Wiltshire Roads Act 1753	26 Geo. 2. c. 42	8 March 1753
An Act for repairing and widening the Road from the West End of Send Street, in the County of Wilts, to The Horse and Jockey in the Parish of Box, in the said County.
Paddington Churchyard Act 1753	26 Geo. 2. c. 43	17 April 1753
An Act for enlarging the Church-yard of the Parish of Paddington, in the County of Middlesex.
Dysart Beer Duties Act 1753 (repealed)	26 Geo. 2. c. 44	17 April 1753
An Act for laying a Duty of Two Pennies Scots, or One Sixth Part of a Penny Sterling, on every Scots Pint of Ale and Beer, which shall be brewed for Sale, brought into, tapped, or sold, within the Town of Dysart and Liberties thereof, and all Places adjacent, lying within Three Hundred Yards of the Boundaries of the said Liberties, for the repairing, improving, and preserving, the Harbour of the said Town. (Repealed by Statute Law Revision Act 1948 (11 & 12 Geo. 6. c. 62))
Manchester Church Act 1753	26 Geo. 2. c. 45	17 April 1753
An Act for building a new Church, within the Town of Manchester, in the County Palatine of Lancaster.
Leicester Roads Act 1753 (repealed)	26 Geo. 2. c. 46	17 April 1753
An Act for repairing the Road from the Borough of Leicester, in the County of Leicester, to the Town of Ashby de la Zouch, in the said County. (Repealed by Leicester and Ashby-de-la-Zouch Road Act 1842 (5 & 6 Vict. c. lxxiv))
Hagley and Birmingham Road Act 1753 (repealed)	26 Geo. 2. c. 47	17 April 1753
An Act for repairing and widening several Roads leading from the Market House (Note: Stourbridge Market Hall was located in the middle of the High Street in Stourbridge until 1773, when it demolished. A new market hall was built nearby in 1827 on the corner of the High Street and Market Street, and the facade of this building survives. 52°27′27″N 2°08′50″W) in Stourbridge, and other Roads therein mentioned, in the Counties of Worcester, Stafford, Salop, and Warwick, respectively. (Repealed by Hagley and Birmingham Road Act 1818 (58 Geo. 3. c. xiv))
Durham and Tyne Bridge Road Act 1753 (repealed)	26 Geo. 2. c. 48	17 April 1753
An Act for enlarging the Term and Powers granted by an Act passed in the Twentieth Year of the Reign of His present Majesty, (Note: Durham to Tyne Bridge Road Act 1746 (20 Geo. 2. c. 12)) for repairing the High Road leading from the City of Durham, in the County of Durham, to Tyne Bridge, in the said County. (Repealed by Road from Durham to Tyne Bridge Act 1824 (5 Geo. 4. c. cii))
Cockermouth and Workington Road Act 1753 (repealed)	26 Geo. 2. c. 49	17 April 1753
An Act for repairing the Road from the City of Carlisle, in the County of Cumberland, to the Market and Sea Port Town of Workington, in the said County. (Repealed by Cockermouth and Workington Road Act 1823 (4 Geo. 4. c. xxiii))
Worcester Roads Act 1753 (repealed)	26 Geo. 2. c. 50	17 April 1753
An Act for repairing and widening the Roads leading from Redstone Ferry, in the County of Worcester, to The Hundred House, and from thence to Monks Bridge, in the Road to the Town of Tenbury; and from the said Hundred House to the said Town of Tenbury, in the said County. (Repealed by Hundred House (Worcestershire) Roads Act 1800 (39 & 40 Geo. 3. c. xcv))
Surrey and Southampton Roads Act 1753 (repealed)	26 Geo. 2. c. 51	17 April 1753
An Act for repairing and widening the Roads leading from a Place called Basing-stone, (Note: The Basing Stone was located near the former Jolly Farmer public house, at the junction of the A30 and A325 roads.) near the Town of Bagshot, in the Parish of Windlesham, in the County of Surry, through Frimley and Farnham, in the same County; and from thence, through Bentley, Hollyborn, Alton, Chawton, Ropley, Bishops Sutton, New Alresford, and Mattingley otherwise Matterley Lane, to the City of Winchester, in the County of Southampton. (Repealed by Bagshot and Farnham, and Alton and Winchester Roads Act 1817 (57 Geo. 3. c. xxvi) (Note: Incorrectly cited as "57 Geo. 3. c. xxxvii" in the Chronological Table of the Statutes.))
Lancaster and Westmorland Roads Act 1753 (repealed)	26 Geo. 2. c. 52	17 April 1753
An Act for widening and repairing the High Road leading from Heron Syke, which divides the Counties of Lancaster and Westmorland, to the Town of Kirkby in Kendall, and from the said Town of Kirkby in Kendall, through the Town of Shapp to Emont Bridge, in the said County of Westmorland. (Repealed by Heronsyke, Kendal and Eamont Bridge Road Act 1815 (55 Geo. 3. c. xxxvii) (Note: Incorrectly cited as "33 Geo. 3. c. 171" in the Chronological Table of the Statutes.))
Buxton and Manchester Road Act 1753 (repealed)	26 Geo. 2. c. 53	17 April 1753
An Act to continue and render more effectual Three Acts of Parliament, passed in the Eleventh Year of the Reign of His late Majesty King George the First, (Note: Derbyshire Roads Act 1724 (11 Geo. 1. c. 13)) and in the Third (Note: Buxton to Manchester Road Act 1729 (3 Geo. 2. c. 4)) and Twenty-second (Note: Buxton to Manchester Road Act 1748 (22 Geo. 2. c. 12)) Years of the Reign of His present Majesty, for repairing the Road from Sherbrooke Hill near Buxton and Chapel in the Frith in the County of Derby, through the Town of Stockport, in the County of Chester, to Manchester in the County of Lancaster, and other Roads in the said Acts mentioned; and for repairing the Road from the School-house in Didsbury to the Bridge in Wilmslow, in the said County of Chester; and for erecting a Bridge over the River Mersey. (Repealed by Manchester to Buxton Road Act 1793 (33 Geo. 3. c. 171))
Flimwell and Hastings Road Act 1753 (repealed)	26 Geo. 2. c. 54	17 April 1753
An Act for repairing and widening the Road leading from Flimwell Vent, in the Parish of Ticehurst, in the County of Sussex, to the Town and Port of Hastings, in the said County. (Repealed by Road from Ticehurst to Hastings Act 1821 (1 & 2 Geo. 4. c. xli))
Shoreditch Road Act 1753 (repealed)	26 Geo. 2. c. 55	17 April 1753
An Act for enlarging the Term and Powers granted by an Act made in the Eleventh Year of His present Majesty's Reign, intituled, "An Act for repairing the Road from Shoreditch Church, through Hackney, to Stanford Hill, and cross Cambridge Heath, over Bethnal Green, to the Turnpike at Mile End, in the County of Middlesex." (Note: Shoreditch to Stamford Hill Road Act 1737 (11 Geo. 2. c. 29)) (Repealed by Road from Shoreditch Church through Hackney Act 1821 (1 & 2 Geo. 4. c. cxii) (Note: Incorrectly cited as "1-3 Geo. 4. c. cxii" in the Chronological Table of the Statutes.))
Hertford and Ware Roads Act 1753 (repealed)	26 Geo. 2. c. 56	17 April 1753
An Act for continuing and giving further Powers to the Trustees for putting in Execution Two Acts of Parliament, (Note: Hertford and Ware Roads Act 1724 (11 Geo. 1. c. 11)) (Note: Hertford and Ware Roads Act 1732 (6 Geo. 2. c. 15)) for repairing the Roads from the Parish of Endfield, in the County of Middlesex, to the Town of Hertford, and other Roads in the said Acts mentioned. (Repealed by Hertford and Ware Roads Act 1813 (53 Geo. 3. c. xxvii) and Roads from Hertford and Ware Act 1833 (3 & 4 Will. 4. c. xlii))
Debtors' Prison, Devonshire Act 1753 (repealed)	26 Geo. 2. c. 57	17 April 1753
An Act for raising a Sum of Money, by a County Rate, for purchasing a proper Prison for Debtors in the County of Devon. (Repealed by Statute Law (Repeals) Act 2008 (c. 12))
Portsea Common Chapel Act 1753	26 Geo. 2. c. 58	17 April 1753
An Act for building a Chapel on the Common, in the Parish of Portsea, in the County of Southampton; and for vesting Power in certain Trustees, for the Regulation thereof.
Burton-upon-Trent and Derby Road Act 1753 (repealed)	26 Geo. 2. c. 59	17 April 1753
An Act for repairing and widening the Road from the West End of the Town of Burton upon Trent, in the County of Stafford, through the said Town, to the South End of the Town of Derby, in the County of Derby. (Repealed by Burton-upon-Trent and Derby Road Act 1799 (39 Geo. 3. c. xiv) and Burton-upon-Trent and Derby Road Act 1818 (58 Geo. 3. c. xxxvi))
Wiltshire, Dorset and Somerset Roads Act 1753 (repealed)	26 Geo. 2. c. 60	17 April 1753
An Act for repairing and widening the Road from the Top of White Sheet Hill, in the Parish of Donhead Saint Andrew, in the County of Wilts, through the Towns of Shaftesbury, Milborne Port, and Sherborne, in the Counties of Dorset and Somerset, to The Halfway-house, in the Parish of Nether otherwise Lower Compton, in the said County of Dorset, and several other Roads near the Towns of Shaftesbury and Sherborne aforesaid. (Repealed by Dorset, Devon and Somerset Roads Act 1800 (39 & 40 Geo. 3. c. lxi) and Donhead St. Andrew and Nether Compton Road (Wiltshire) Act 1801 (41 Geo. 3. (U.K.) c. xxxviii))
Elland to Leeds Road Act 1753 (repealed)	26 Geo. 2. c. 61	17 April 1753
An Act for enlarging the Term and Powers granted by an Act passed in the Fourteenth Year of the Reign of His present Majesty, intituled, "An Act for repairing the Road leading from Ealand to the Town of Leeds, in the West Riding of the County of York." (Note: Elland to Leeds Road Act 1740 (14 Geo. 2. c. 25)) (Repealed by Road from Ealand to Leeds Act 1827 (7 & 8 Geo. 4. c. lxix))
Cheshire Roads Act 1753 (repealed)	26 Geo. 2. c. 62	17 April 1753
An Act for repairing and widening the Roads from Henshall's Smithy, upon Cranage Green, through the Town of Nether Knutsford, and by the South Guide Post in Mere and Bucklow Hill, to the Town of Altrincham, in the County Palatine of Chester, and from the said Guide Post to Warrington, in the County of Lancaster, and from Bucklow Hill aforesaid to Penny's Lane, near Northwich, in the said County of Chester. (Repealed by Road from Cranage Green to Altrincham Act 1820 (1 Geo. 4. c. xxv))
Lancashire Roads Act 1753 (repealed)	26 Geo. 2. c. 63	17 April 1753
An Act for repairing and widening the Roads from a certain Place in the Town of Salford, to the Towns of Warrington and Bolton, and through Wardley Lane to the Town of Wigan, and to the Stocks in the Township of Duxbury, and to a Place called The Broad Oak in Worseley, in the County Palatine of Lancaster. (Repealed by Lancashire Roads Act 1784 (24 Geo. 3. Sess. 2. c. 68))
Tadcaster and Otley Road Act 1753 (repealed)	26 Geo. 2. c. 64	17 April 1753
An Act for repairing and widening the Road from Tadcaster, through Newton, Collingham, Harewood, Arthington, and Pool, to Otley, in the West Riding of the County of York. (Repealed by Tadcaster and Otley Road Act 1842 (5 & 6 Vict. c. xciii))
Lancashire Roads (No. 2) Act 1753 (repealed)	26 Geo. 2. c. 65	17 April 1753
An Act for enlarging the Term and Powers granted by Two Acts of Parliament, one passed in the Twelfth Year of the Reign of His late Majesty King George the First, (Note: Liverpool to Prescot Road Act 1725 (12 Geo. 1. c. 21)) and the other passed in the Nineteenth Year of the Reign of His present Majesty, (Note: Lancashire Roads Act 1745 (19 Geo. 2. c. 19)) for repairing the Road from Liverpoole to Prescot, and other Roads therein mentioned, in the County Palatine of Lancaster; and also for repairing the Road from Prescot, through Whiston, Rainhill, Bold, and Sankey, to the Town of Warrington, and also the Road from Saint Helen to Ashton, in the said County Palatine. (Repealed by Lancaster Roads Act 1771 (11 Geo. 3. c. 91))
Wiltshire and Southampton Roads Act 1753 (repealed)	26 Geo. 2. c. 66	17 April 1753
An Act for repairing and widening the Roads leading from Lobcomb Corner, in the Parish of Winterslow, to Harnham Bridge, in the County of Wilts; and from the West Corner of Saint Anne's Street, in the City of New Sarum, to the Parishes of Landford and Brook, and from thence to Ealing; and from Landford aforesaid, through Ower and Testwood, to Ealing aforesaid, in the County of Southampton. (Repealed by Winterslow and New Sarum Roads Act 1840 (3 & 4 Vict. c. xxxiv))
Brough and Eamont Bridge Road Act 1753 (repealed)	26 Geo. 2. c. 67	17 April 1753
An Act for repairing and widening the Roads from the East End of Brough under Stainmore, (Note: Brough, Cumbria.) in the County of Westmorland, by the End of Appleby Bridge, (Note: The B6542 (former A66) road passes the end of the bridge over the River Eden, in Appleby-in-Westmorland, Cumbria. 54°34′42″N 2°29′21″W) to Emont Bridge, (Note: Eamont Bridge carrying the A6 road across the River Eamont in Cumbria. 54°39′06″N 2°44′31″W) in the said County. (Repealed by Brough and Eamont Bridge Turnpike Act 1856 (19 & 20 Vict. c. lxxii))
Kent Roads Act 1753 (repealed)	26 Geo. 2. c. 68	17 April 1753
An Act for amending, widening, and repairing, the Road leading from Dover to Barham Downs, in the County of Kent. (Repealed by Roads from Dover to Barham Downs and Sandgate Act 1823 (4 Geo. 4. c. lxxxi))
Somerset Roads Act 1753 (repealed)	26 Geo. 2. c. 69	17 April 1753
An Act for repairing and widening the Road from The Halfway-house, in the Parish of Lower Compton, in the County of Dorset, through the Towns of Yeovil, Crewkerne, and Chard, to the East End of the Town of Axminster, in the County of Devon, and several other Roads round the said Town of Yeovil, in the County of Somerset. (Repealed by Dorset, Devon and Somerset Roads Act 1800 (39 & 40 Geo. 3. c. lxi))
Oxford and Gloucester Roads Act 1753 (repealed)	26 Geo. 2. c. 70	17 April 1753
An Act for repairing and widening the Road from the Hand and Post in Upton Field, in the Parish of Burford, in the County of Oxford, through the several Parishes within mentioned, to a Place in the Parish of Preston, in the County of Gloucester, called Dancy's Fancy. (Repealed by Burford and Dancy's Fancy Road Act 1822 (3 Geo. 4. c. xlvii), Annual Turnpike Acts Continuance Act 1867 (30 & 31 Vict. c. 121) and Statute Law (Repeals) Act 2013 (c. 2))
Somerset Roads (No. 2) Act 1753 (repealed)	26 Geo. 2. c. 71	15 May 1753
An Act for repairing and widening the Roads therein mentioned, leading to and from the Towns of Shepton Malet and Ivelchester, in the County of Somerset. (Repealed by Ilchester Roads Act 1800 (39 & 40 Geo. 3. c. vii))
Suffolk Roads Act 1753 (repealed)	26 Geo. 2. c. 72	15 May 1753
An Act for continuing and making more effectual Two Acts of Parliament, for repairing the Road leading from Ipswich to Cleydon, in the County of Suffolk, and other Roads in the said Acts mentioned; and for repairing the Road from Cleydon aforesaid to Coddenham Beacon in the said County. (Repealed by Ipswich and Yaxley Roads Act 1793 (33 Geo. 3. c. 128))
Warwick Roads Act 1753 (repealed)	26 Geo. 2. c. 73	15 May 1753
An Act to continue and render more effectual Two Acts of Parliament, one passed in the Tenth Year of the Reign of His late Majesty King George the First, (Note: Warwick Roads Act 1723 (10 Geo. 1. c. 15)) and the other passed in the Thirteenth Year of the Reign of His present Majesty, (Note: Warwick Roads Act 1739 (13 Geo. 2. c. 22)) for repairing the Road from Dunchurch to the Bottom of Mereden Hill, in the County of Warwick; and for repairing the Road from the Bottom of Mereden Hill aforesaid to Stone Bridge, in the said County. (Repealed by Road from Dunchurch to Stonebridge Act 1824 (5 Geo. 4. c. xliii))
Exeter Roads Act 1753 (repealed)	26 Geo. 2. c. 74	15 May 1753
An Act for amending several Roads leading from the City of Exeter. (Repealed by Exeter Roads, etc. Act 1773 (13 Geo. 3. c. 109))
Thirsk Roads Act 1753 (repealed)	26 Geo. 2. c. 75	15 May 1753
An Act for widening and repairing the High Road leading from Northallerton to the South Wall of the Church-yard of the Town of Thirsk, and from the South-East End of the Street called Finkell Street in Thirsk aforesaid, to and through the Town of Easingwold in the County of York, to a Place called Burton Stone near the City of York; and also the Road from Thirsk aforesaid to Topcliffe in the North Riding of the County of York. (Repealed by Roads from Northallerton and Thirsk Act 1808 (48 Geo. 3. c. vii) and Thirsk Turnpike Roads Act 1830 (11 Geo. 4 & 1 Will. 4. c. iv))
Wells Roads Act 1753 (repealed)	26 Geo. 2. c. 76	15 May 1753
An Act for repairing and widening the Road leading from Pipers Inn in the Parish of Ashcott, in the County of Somerset, to and through Glaston, otherwise Glastonbury, and Wells, to the Direction or White Post in the great Western Road to the City of Bath, and also from Wells to Rush Hill, leading to the City of Bristol. (Repealed by Wells (Somerset) Roads and Improvement Act 1821 (1 & 2 Geo. 4. c. xii))
Ferrybridge and Boroughbridge Road Act 1753 (repealed)	26 Geo. 2. c. 77	15 May 1753
An Act to explain and make more effectual an Act passed in the Fourteenth Year of His present Majesty's Reign, (Note: Doncaster and Tadcaster Road Act 1740 (14 Geo. 2. c. 28)) for repairing the Roads from Doncaster, through Ferrybridge, to the South Side of Tadcaster Cross; and also from Ferrybridge to Weatherby, and from thence to Boroughbridge, in the County of York. (Repealed by Ferrybridge and Boroughbridge Road Act 1842 (5 & 6 Vict. c. lxxxvi))
Drayton and Edgehill Road Act 1753 (repealed)	26 Geo. 2. c. 78	15 May 1753
An Act to widen and repair the Road from the Guide Post near the End of Drayton Lane near Banbury in the County of Oxford, to the House called The Sun Rising at the Top of Edge Hill in the County of Warwick. (Repealed by Road from Banbury to Edgehill Act 1822 (3 Geo. 4. c. xc))
Prestonpans Beer Duties Act 1753 (repealed)	26 Geo. 2. c. 79	15 May 1753
An Act for laying a Duty of Two Pennies Scots, or a Sixth Part of a Penny Sterling, upon every Scots Pint of Ale and Beer, which shall be brewed for Sale, brought into, tapped, or sold, within the Town and Parish of Preston Pans, in the Shire of East Lothian, otherwise Haddingtoun, for repairing the Harbour of the said Town; and for other Purposes therein mentioned. (Repealed by Statute Law Revision Act 1948 (11 & 12 Geo. 6. c. 62))
Hampstead Roads Act 1753 (repealed)	26 Geo. 2. c. 80	15 May 1753
An Act to continue and render more effectual several Acts of Parliament, for repairing the Highways leading to Highgate Gate House and Hampstead, and other Roads in the said Acts mentioned, in the County of Middlesex. (Repealed by Highgate and Hampstead Roads Act 1776 (16 Geo. 3. c. 76) and Roads to Highgate House and Hampstead Act 1821 (1 & 2 Geo. 4. c. cx))
Glasgow and Shotts Road Act 1753 (repealed)	26 Geo. 2. c. 81	15 May 1753
An Act for repairing the Roads from Livingstoun by the Kirk of Shotts to the City of Glasgow, and by the Town of Hamilton to the Town of Strathaven. (Repealed by Livingston and Glasgow Road Act 1814 (54 Geo. 3. c. ccii))
Berwick Roads Act 1753 (repealed)	26 Geo. 2. c. 82	15 May 1753
An Act for repairing the Road from the Turnpike Road at Buckton Burn in the County of Durham, through Berwick upon Tweed, to Lammerton Hill; and also the several other Roads therein mentioned, lying in the said County, and within the Liberties of the said Town of Berwick. (Repealed by Berwick and Durham Roads and Tweed Bridges Act 1802 (42 Geo. 3. c. cxvii))
Bradford and Wakefield Road Act 1753 (repealed)	26 Geo. 2. c. 83	15 May 1753
An Act for repairing and widening the Roads from Kighley to Wakefield and Halifax, and from Dudley Hill to Killinghall and the South West Corner of Harrowgate Enclosures; and more effectually to repair the Roads from Leeds to Hallifax, and Bowling Lane, and Little Horton Lane; and for building a Bridge over the River Wharf, at Poole, in the West Riding of the County of York. (Repealed by Road from Keighley to Bradford Act 1815 (55 Geo. 3. c. li), Road from Dudley Hill and from Beckwithshaw Act 1816 (56 Geo. 3. c. xlviii), Bradford and Wakefield Road Act 1819 (59 Geo. 3. c. lxxx) and Leeds and Halifax Turnpike Roads and Branches Act 1825 (6 Geo. 4. c. cxlix))
Span Smithy, Winsford Bridge and Northwich Roads Act 1753 (repealed)	26 Geo. 2. c. 84	15 May 1753
An Act for repairing and widening the Roads from Spann Smithy in the Township of Elton, through the Town of Middlewich, and by Spittle Hill in Stanthorne to Winsford Bridge, and from Spittle Hill to the Town of Northwich, in the County Palatine of Chester. (Repealed by Span Smithy, Winsford Bridge and Northwich Roads Act 1822 (3 Geo. 4. c. xlviii) (Note: Incorrectly cited as "59 Geo. 3. c. xviii" and "3 Geo. 4. c. xlviii" in the Chronological Table of the Statutes.))
Leicester and Stafford Roads Act 1753 (repealed)	26 Geo. 2. c. 85	15 May 1753
An Act for repairing the Road from Ashby de la Zouch in the County of Leicester, through Burton upon Trent in the County of Stafford, and to The Cock Inn in Tutbury in the said County. (Repealed by Ashby-de-la-Zouch and Tutbury Road Act 1824 (5 Geo. 4. c. ci))
Yorkshire and Westmorland Roads Act 1753 (repealed)	26 Geo. 2. c. 86	15 May 1753
An Act for repairing, amending, and widening, the Road from Keighley in the West Riding of the County of York, to Kirkby in Kendal in the County of Westmorland. (Repealed by Keighley to Kirkby Road (Yorkshire District) Act 1823 (4 Geo. 4. c. xlix))
Old Street Road Act 1753 (repealed)	26 Geo. 2. c. 87	15 May 1753
An Act for repairing and widening the Road from The Stones End near Shoreditch Church to the Center of the Bridge in Old Street Road, and through Old Street, in the Parish of Saint Luke, Middlesex, to the West End of the said Street next the Pavement in Goswell Street. (Repealed by Metropolis Roads Act 1826 (7 Geo. 4. c. cxlii))
Northampton Roads Act 1753	26 Geo. 2. c. 88	15 May 1753
An Act for repairing the Road leading from Oundle in the County of Northampton to Alconbury cum Weston in the County of Huntingdon, from Barnwell in the said County of Northampton to Alconbury cum Weston aforesaid, and from The Mile Brook in Hamerton to Wood Lane End, next the Parish of Great Gidding, in the said County of Huntingdon.
Stockton and Barnard Castle Road Act 1753 (repealed)	26 Geo. 2. c. 89	15 May 1753
An Act for explaining, amending, and making more effectual, Two Acts of Parliament; the one, passed in the Twentieth Year of His present Majesty's Reign, intituled, "An Act for repairing the High Road leading from the Town of Stockton upon Tees, in the County of Durham, to Darlington, and from thence through Winstone to Barnard Castle, in the said County," (Note: Stockton to Barnard Castle Road Act 1746 (20 Geo. 2. c. 25)) and the other, passed in the Twenty-second Year of His said Majesty's Reign, intituled, "An Act for enlarging the Term and Powers granted by the said first mentioned Act; and for the effectual amending of the said Road." (Note: Stockton to Barnard Castle Road Act 1748 (22 Geo. 2. c. 51)) (Repealed by Stockton-upon-Tees, Darlington and Barnard Castle Road Act 1805 (45 Geo. 3. c. xvii))
Glasgow Roads Act 1753 (repealed)	26 Geo. 2. c. 90	15 May 1753
An Act for repairing several Roads leading into the City of Glasgow. (Repealed by Road from Glasgow to Redburn Bridge Act 1803 (43 Geo. 3. c. cx), Yoker Bridge and Dumbarton Road Act 1813 (53 Geo. 3. c. lxiii), Road from Glasgow to Garscube Act 1809 (49 Geo. 3. c. xxx) and Glasgow and Lanark Road Act 1843 (6 & 7 Vict. c. xxxix))
Perth Roads Act 1753 (repealed)	26 Geo. 2. c. 91	15 May 1753
An Act for repairing the Road from the North Queen's Ferry, through the Towns of Inverkeithing and Kinross, to the Town of Perth; and also the Road from the said Queen's Ferry to the Towns of Dumfermline, Torryburn, and Culross; and also the Road from the said Queen's Ferry, through Inverkeithing, to Bruntisland and Kirkaldie. (Repealed by Road from North Queensferry to Perth Act 1809 (49 Geo. 3. c. xxxi))
Somerset Roads (No. 3) Act 1753 (repealed)	26 Geo. 2. c. 92	7 June 1753
An Act for repairing, amending, and widening, the several Roads leading from The Red Post, in the Parish of Fivehead, through the Towns of Langport and Somerton, to Butwell; and also from Curry Rivell to Puckington Lane, and from Cary Bridge to Street Cross, in the County of Somerset. (Repealed by Langport, Somerton and Castle Cary Roads Act 1824 (5 Geo. 4. c. xcviii))
Peebles Road Act 1753 (repealed)	26 Geo. 2. c. 93	7 June 1753
An Act for repairing and widening the several Roads in the County of Peebles, leading from Tweedscross towards the City of Edinburgh, by Blyth Bridge, La Mancha, and Wheam, and by Linton and Carlops, and from Ingleston, through Carlops, until all the said Roads join the Limits of the County of Edinburgh. (Repealed by Roads in Peebles Act 1809 (49 Geo. 3. c. xxxvi))
Saint Botolph Church, Aldersgate Act 1753 (repealed)	26 Geo. 2. c. 94	7 June 1753
An Act to enable the Owners of Houses and Lands, in the Parish of Saint Botolph without Aldersgate, and the Inhabitants thereof, to repair the Church and Steeple belonging to the said Parish. (Repealed by Statute Law (Repeals) Act 2013 (c. 2))
Catterick Bridge to Durham Road Act 1753 (repealed)	26 Geo. 2. c. 95	7 June 1753
An Act to explain and amend an Act passed in the Twentieth Year of His present Majesty's Reign, intituled, "An Act for repairing the Road leading from Catherick Bridge in the County of York, to Yarm in the said County, and from thence to Stockton in the County of Durham; and from thence, through Sedgefield in the said County of Durham, to the City of Durham." (Note: Catterick Bridge to Durham Road Act 1746 (20 Geo. 2. c. 28)) (Repealed by Catterick Bridge to Durham Road Act 1788 (28 Geo. 3. c. 90))
Paisley Beer Duties Act 1753 (repealed)	26 Geo. 2. c. 96	7 June 1753
An Act for laying a Duty of Two Pennies Scots, or One Sixth Part of a Penny Sterling, on every Scots Pint of Ale and Beer, which shall be brewed for Sale, brought into, tapped, or sold, within the Town of Paisley and Liberties thereof, in the County of Renfrew, for improving the Navigation of the River Cart; and for other Purposes. (Repealed by Statute Law Revision Act 1948 (11 & 12 Geo. 6. c. 62))
Saint George's Hanover Square (Poor Relief) Act 1753 (repealed)	26 Geo. 2. c. 97	15 May 1753
An Act for the better Relief and Employment of the Poor, in the Parish of Saint George Hanover Square, within the Liberty of the City of Westminster; and for cleansing the Streets, and repairing the Highways, within the said Parish. (Repealed by St. George Hanover Square Improvement Act 1789 (29 Geo. 3. c. 75))
Christchurch, Stepney (Poor Relief) Act 1753 (repealed)	26 Geo. 2. c. 98	15 May 1753
An Act more effectually to enable the Parishioners of the Parish of Christ Church, in the County of Middlesex, to purchase, hire, or erect, a Workhouse, for the employing and maintaining the Poor of the said Parish; and for the more effectual Support and Employment of the Poor therein. (Repealed by London Government (Borough of Stepney) Order in Council 1901 (SR&O 1901/276))
Chichester (Poor Relief) Act 1753 (repealed)	26 Geo. 2. c. 99	15 May 1753
An Act for the better Relief and Employment of the Poor, and for enlightening the Streets, Passages, and open Places, within the City of Chichester, and several Places adjoining thereto, and The Close within the said City. (Repealed by Local Government Board's Provisional Orders Confirmation (Poor Law) Act 1895 (58 & 59 Vict. c. xcv))
East Greenwich Poor Relief, etc. Act 1753 (repealed)	26 Geo. 2. c. 100	15 May 1753
An Act for the better Relief and Employment of the Poor, in the Parish of East Greenwich, in the County of Kent; and for repairing the Highways and cleansing the Streets thereof. (Repealed by East Greenwich Poor Relief and Improvement Act 1828 (9 Geo. 4. c. xliii) (Note: Incorrectly cited as "Geo. 4. c. xliii" in the Chronological Table of the Statutes.))
Westminster, King's Street Act 1753 (repealed)	26 Geo. 2. c. 101	7 June 1753
An Act to enable James Mallors to open a Street, (Note: Great George Street, Westminster.) from the West Side of King Street, (Note: Both King's Street and Delahay Street were on the site now occupied by Government Offices Great George Street.) in the Parish of Saint Margaret; in the City of Westminster, to the Back Part of the Houses, Gardens, and Yards, on the West Side of Delahaye Street, in the same Parish; and for other Purposes therein mentioned. (Repealed by Statute Law Revision Act 1948 (11 & 12 Geo. 6. c. 62))

=== Private acts ===
Short title	Citation	Royal assent
Long title
Naturalization of Frederick Hoffgaard Act 1753	26 Geo. 2. c. 1 Pr.	8 February 1753
An Act for naturalizing Frederich Hoffgaard.
Peploe's Name Act 1753	26 Geo. 2. c. 2 Pr.	8 March 1753
An Act to enable John Peploe Birch, an Infant, heretofore called John Peploe, to take and use the Surname of Peploe Birch only, pursuant to the Will of Samuel Birch Esquire, deceased.
Carleton's Name Act 1753	26 Geo. 2. c. 3 Pr.	8 March 1753
An Act for enabling Abraham Carleton Esquire, now called Abraham Cumberbatch, and his Issue Male, to take and use the Surname of Cumberbatch.
Naturalization of Daniel Boumeester, James Rilliet, and Others Act 1753	26 Geo. 2. c. 4 Pr.	8 March 1753
An Act for naturalizing Daniel Boumeester, James Rilliet, Anthony Bertrand, Frederick Teise, Francis Brouzet, and George Grand.
Naturalization of John Schoen, Peter Rodolph, and Others Act 1753	26 Geo. 2. c. 5 Pr.	8 March 1753
An Act to naturalize John Henry Schoen, Peter Rodolph, George Alexander Fatio, William Du Bois, William Konink, and Henry Klausing.
Naturalization of Jacob Vaulk Act 1753	26 Geo. 2. c. 6 Pr.	8 March 1753
An Act for naturalizing Jacob Valk.
Naturalization of Beat Rodolph Nerbel Act 1753	26 Geo. 2. c. 7 Pr.	8 March 1753
An Act for naturalizing Beat Rodolph Victor Nerbel.
Making the exemplification of Henry Earl of Shelburne's will evidence in all British and Irish courts.	26 Geo. 2. c. 8 Pr.	17 April 1753
An Act for making the Exemplification of the last Will of Henry late Earl of Shelburne in the Kingdom of Ireland, deceased, Evidence in all Courts of Law and Equity in Great Britain and Ireland.
Vesting Pusey (Berkshire) tithe and glebe in John Allen Pusey and heirs and settling a yearly rent on the rector of Pusey in lieu thereof.	26 Geo. 2. c. 9 Pr.	17 April 1753
An Act for settling a Yearly Rent on the Rector of Pusey, in the County of Berks, and his Successors, in Lieu of his Tithes and Part of his Glebe; and vesting the said Tithes and Glebe in John Allen Pusey Esquire and his Heirs.
Gilbert's Estate Act 1753	26 Geo. 2. c. 10 Pr.	17 April 1753
An Act for Sale of divers Lands and Hereditaments, in the County of Gloucester, devised by the Will of Alice Gilbert Spinster, for raising Money, to discharge several Debts and Legacies; and for laying out the Surplus in the Purchase of Lands, to be settled to the Uses of her Will.
Small's Estate Act 1753	26 Geo. 2. c. 11 Pr.	17 April 1753
An Act for Sale of an undivided Share of Tithes, in the Isle of Wight, settled on John Foyle Small, Mary Small his Wife, and John Small their Son, an Infant; and for laying out the Money arising by such Sale in the Purchase of an Estate in the County of Gloucester, to be settled to the same Uses.
Inge's Estate Act 1753	26 Geo. 2. c. 12 Pr.	17 April 1753
An Act to enable Theodore William Inge Esquire to make Building Leases of Part of his settled Estate, situate in or near Birmingham, in the County of Warwick.
Confirming and establishing an agreement concerning Canswick or Watlas Moor (Yorkshire) inclosure.	26 Geo. 2. c. 13 Pr.	17 April 1753
An Act for confirming and establishing Articles of Agreement, for enclosing and dividing Canswick alias Watlass Moor, in the County of York.
Quennington Inclosure Act 1753	26 Geo. 2. c. 14 Pr.	17 April 1753
An Act for dividing, enclosing, and reducing into Severalty, the Lands in the Common Fields, Common Grounds, Pasture or Feeding Grounds, and all other the Lands lying Open, in the Parishes of Quennington, in the County of Gloucester.
Hinton Inclosure Act 1753	26 Geo. 2. c. 15 Pr.	17 April 1753
An Act for dividing and enclosing the Common, Open, and Arable Fields, Meadows, and Waste Grounds, in the Hamlet of Hinton, in the Parish of Woodford cum membris, in the County of Northampton.
Naturalization of Schweighauser, Girard, Von Hohendorff, Andre and Sollen.	26 Geo. 2. c. 16 Pr.	17 April 1753
An Act to naturalize John James Scbweighauser, David Girard, Christian Van Hohendorff, John Lewis André, and Andrew Sellon.
Naturalization of John Barbutt and Fortunatus Planta.	26 Geo. 2. c. 17 Pr.	17 April 1753
An Act for naturalizing of John David Barbutt and Fortunatus Planta.
Naturalization of Mary Sybella Harrison.	26 Geo. 2. c. 18 Pr.	17 April 1753
An Act to naturalize Mary Sybelle Harrison.
Jekyll's Estate Act 1753	26 Geo. 2. c. 19 Pr.	15 May 1753
An Act for vesting the undivided Twelfth Part of Ann Jekyll, an Infant, in the Real Estate of Sir Joseph Jekyll Knight, deceased, in Trustees, to enable them to convey the same to the Purchasers thereof under a Decree of the Court of Chancery.
Knight's Estate Act 1753	26 Geo. 2. c. 20 Pr.	15 May 1753
An Act for vesting an undivided Fourth Part of Elizabeth Knight of and in divers Manors, Lands, and Hereditaments, in the County of York, late the Estate of Robert Plompton Esquire, deceased, in Trustees, in Trust, to sell the same for the Purposes therein mentioned.
Pleydell's Estate Act 1753	26 Geo. 2. c. 21 Pr.	15 May 1753
An Act for vesting the Estate of Edmund Morton Pleydell Esquire in Trustees, to settle the same pursuant to an Agreement made previous to the Marriage of Edmund Morton Pleydell the Younger Esquire with Anne his Wife; and for other Purposes therein mentioned.
Chadwicke's Estate Act 1753	26 Geo. 2. c. 22 Pr.	15 May 1753
An Act to enable Evelyn Chadwicke Esquire and his Wife, and their Issue, to make Building Leases of Part of his settled Estate, in the Parishes of Saint James Westminster and Saint Martin in the Fields.
Headlam's Estate Act 1753	26 Geo. 2. c. 23 Pr.	15 May 1753
An Act for establishing and rendering effectual certain Articles, for the Sale of the Manor, or reputed Manor, and divers Lands, Tenements, and Hereditaments, at Kexby, in the County of York, late the Estate of Charles Headlam Esquire, deceased; and for vesting the undivided Third Part or Share of Ann Headlam Spinster, an Infant, of and in the said Manor and Premises, in Trustees, in Trust, to convey the same pursuant to the said Articles; and for other Purposes therein mentioned.
Confirming an agreement between George Pitt and Stratfieldsay (Hampshire) rector for exchange of lands in the parish and for the demolition and rebuilding of the parish church with connecting roads by George Pitt.	26 Geo. 2. c. 24 Pr.	15 May 1753
An Act for confirming an Agreement between George Pitt Esquire and the Rector of the Church of Stratfield Sea in the County of Southampton, for Exchange of Lands in the said Parish; and to enable the said George Pitt to take down the present and erect a new Parish Church there; and for making Roads to the said Church.
Confirming and establishing an agreement for the exchange of lands in Yorkshire between the Prebend of Stillington and Stephen Croft.	26 Geo. 2. c. 25 Pr.	15 May 1753
An Act for confirming and establishing an Exchange agreed upon, between the Prebendary of the Prebend of Stillington and Stephen Croft Esquire, of certain Lands and Hereditaments, in the County of York.
Ennever's Divorce Act 1753	26 Geo. 2. c. 26 Pr.	15 May 1753
An Act to dissolve the Marriage of John Ennever Gentleman with Mary Cornwell his now Wife; and to enable him to marry again; and for other Purposes therein mentioned.
Eastleach Martin or Botherup (Gloucestershire) inclosure and for compensating rector in lieu of tithes and glebe land.	26 Geo. 2. c. 27 Pr.	15 May 1753
An Act for exchanging, dividing, enclosing, and reducing into Severalty, the Lands, Common Grounds, Pastures, Feeding Grounds, and other the Lands and Grounds, lying and being in the Manor and Parish of Eastlech Martin, otherwise Botherup, in the County of Gloucester; and for making a Recompense and Compensation to the Rector, in Lieu of his Tithes and Glebe Lands.
Loathley Inclosure Act 1753	26 Geo. 2. c. 28 Pr.	15 May 1753
An Act for confirming and establishing an Agreement, for enclosing and dividing certain Common and Waste Ground, in the Manor of Leathley, in the County of York.
Hexham Inclosure Act 1753	26 Geo. 2. c. 29 Pr.	15 May 1753
An Act for enclosing and dividing certain Wastes and Commons, in the Manor of Hexham, in the County of Northumberland.
Latchmore's Name Act 1754	26 Geo. 2. c. 30 Pr.	15 May 1753
An Act for enabling John Latchmore and his Issue to take and use the Surname of Frye.
Maurice Rodatz's Naturalization Act 1753	26 Geo. 2. c. 31 Pr.	15 May 1753
An Act for naturalizing Christian Maurice Rodatz.
Earl of Ashburnham's Estate Act 1753	26 Geo. 2. c. 32 Pr.	7 June 1753
An Act for Sale of an Estate at Bretherton, in the County of Lancaster, pursuant to the Will of John late Earl of Ashburnham, deceased; and for the Purposes therein mentioned.
Confirming and establishing Sir Cyril Wich's, Elizabeth Wilson's and Mary Turton's estates partition and settlement.	26 Geo. 2. c. 33 Pr.	7 June 1753
An Act for confirming and establishing a Partition of several Manors, Lands, and Hereditaments, in the County of York, belonging to Sir Cyril Wich Baronet, Elizabeth Willson, and Mary Turton, respectively; and a Settlement made thereof for the Benefit of the several Parties entitled to the several undivided Shares thereof before such Partition.
Scudamore's Estate Act 1753	26 Geo. 2. c. 34 Pr.	7 June 1753
An Act to empower the Guardians of Frances Fitz Roy Scudamore, an Infant, to make Building Leases of her Estate in Southwark, in the County of Surry.
Manning's Estate Act 1753	26 Geo. 2. c. 35 Pr.	7 June 1753
An Act for Sale of the undivided Moieties of divers Manors, Lands, and Hereditaments, in the County of Suffolk, the settled Estate of Matthew Manning Doctor in Physick, for raising Money, to discharge a Mortgage Debt affecting the same; and for laying out the Surplus thereof in the Purchase of other Lands and Hereditaments, to be settled to the Uses therein mentioned.
Brain's Estate Act 1753	26 Geo. 2. c. 36 Pr.	7 June 1753
An Act for vesting the Parts or Shares late belonging to Benjamin Brain Merchant, deceased, of and in One Twenty-fourth Part of the Eastern Division of the Province of New Jersey, in America, in Trustees, to be sold, for the Purposes therein mentioned.
Sale of Long Ditton advowson and purchase and settling of other lands.	26 Geo. 2. c. 37 Pr.	7 June 1753
An Act for vesting the Advowson of Long Ditton, in the County of Surry, in Trustees, to be sold; and for laying out the Money arising by such Sale in the Purchase of Lands, to be settled to the same Uses; and for other Purposes therein mentioned.
Rawstorn's Estate Act 1753	26 Geo. 2. c. 38 Pr.	7 June 1753
An Act for vesting the Estate late of William Rawstorn Esquire, at Basseldon, in the County of Berks, in Trustees, to sell the same; and to lay out the Money arising by such Sale in the Purchase of another Estate, to be settled to the Uses of his Will.
Craigie's Estate Act 1753	26 Geo. 2. c. 39 Pr.	7 June 1753
An Act to enable John Craigie of Dumbernie Esquire to sell Lands in the County of Perth; and lay out the Money arising thereby in the Purchase of Lands contiguous to other Lands of the said John Craigie, in the County of Fife; and for other Purposes therein mentioned.
Grubbe's Estate Act 1753	26 Geo. 2. c. 40 Pr.	7 June 1753
An Act to empower William Hunt Grubbe Esquire to make Leases of certain Estates in the County of Wilts; and for vesting the Monies arising by Fines to be received for such Leases in Trustees, for the Purposes therein mentioned.
Knightley's Estate Act 1753	26 Geo. 2. c. 41 Pr.	7 June 1753
An Act for vesting certain Lands and Hereditaments, Part of the settled Estate of Valentine Knightley Esquire, in the County of Northampton, in the said Valentine Knightley and his Heirs; and for settling other Estates in the same County, of greater Value, in Lieu thereof.
Meynell's Estate Act 1753	26 Geo. 2. c. 42 Pr.	7 June 1753
An Act for confirming the Will of Littleton Pointz Meynell Esquire, deceased; and for making Provision for Godfrey Meynell Esquire his Eldest Son and Heir, and Judith Meynell his Daughter; and for enabling Huge Meynell Esquire, his Second Son and Devisee, to make a Jointure during his Minority; and for settling the Estates of the said Littleton Pointz Meynell to the Uses therein mentioned.
Fowler's Estate Act 1753	26 Geo. 2. c. 43 Pr.	7 June 1753
An Act for raising Money, by Sale of the Estates late of Hugh Fowler of Robestone in the County of Pembroke Esquire, deceased, to discharge the Debts and Encumbrances affecting the same; and for making a Partition of such Estates, or so much thereof as shall not be sold, for the Purposes aforesaid.
Low's Divorce Act 1753	26 Geo. 2. c. 44 Pr.	7 June 1753
An Act to dissolve the Marriage of Samuel Low Esquire with Elizabeth Rogers his now Wife; and to enable him to marry again; and for other Purposes therein mentioned.
Enabling the Treasury to compound with John Philpot and John Hutchinson and their sureties for a debt due to the Crown for tobacco customs.	26 Geo. 2. c. 45 Pr.	7 June 1753
An Act to enable the Commissioners for executing the Office of Treasurer of His Majesty's Exchequer, or the Lord High Treasurer, for the Time being, to compound with John Philpot and John Hutchinson, and their Sureties, a Debt due to the Crown, for Customs for Tobacco.
Felton Inclosure Act 1753	26 Geo. 2. c. 46 Pr.	7 June 1753
An Act for dividing and enclosing the Common called Felton Common, in the Parish of Felton, in the County of Northumberland.
Hilmorton Inclosure Act 1753	26 Geo. 2. c. 47 Pr.	7 June 1753
An Act for dividing and enclosing the Common Fields, Common Pastures, Common Meadows, Common Grounds, and Waste Ground, in the Manor and Parish of Hill-morton, in the County of Warwick.

=== Sources ===
- Pickering, Danby, ed. (1766). The Statutes at Large. Vol. 21: From the 26th to the 30th Year of King George II. Cambridge: Joseph Bentham – via Internet Archive.
- Pickering, Danby, ed. (1766). The Statutes at Large. Vol. 21: From the 26th to the 30th Year of King George II. Cambridge: Joseph Bentham – via Google Books.
- Pickering, Danby, ed. (1766). The Statutes at Large. Vol. 21: From the 26th to the 30th Year of King George II. Cambridge: Joseph Bentham – via Internet Archive.
- Journals of the House of Commons. Vol. 26. London: His Majesty's Stationery Office. 1803. pp. 519–840 – via Google Books.
- Chronological Table of and Index to the Statutes. Vol. 1: To the End of the Session 59 Vict. Sess. 2 (1895) (13th ed.). London: Her Majesty's Stationery Office. 1896. p. 115 – via Google Books.

== See also ==
- List of acts of the Parliament of Great Britain
