= List of acts of the Parliament of Great Britain from 1712 =

This is a complete list of acts of the Parliament of Great Britain for the year 1712.

For acts passed until 1707, see the list of acts of the Parliament of England and the list of acts of the Parliament of Scotland. See also the list of acts of the Parliament of Ireland.

For acts passed from 1801 onwards, see the list of acts of the Parliament of the United Kingdom. For acts of the devolved parliaments and assemblies in the United Kingdom, see the list of acts of the Scottish Parliament, the list of acts of the Northern Ireland Assembly, and the list of acts and measures of Senedd Cymru; see also the list of acts of the Parliament of Northern Ireland.

The number shown after each act's title is its chapter number. Acts are cited using this number, preceded by the year(s) of the reign during which the relevant parliamentary session was held; thus the Union with Ireland Act 1800 is cited as "39 & 40 Geo. 3. c. 67", meaning the 67th act passed during the session that started in the 39th year of the reign of George III and which finished in the 40th year of that reign. Note that the modern convention is to use Arabic numerals in citations (thus "41 Geo. 3" rather than "41 Geo. III"). Acts of the last session of the Parliament of Great Britain and the first session of the Parliament of the United Kingdom are both cited as "41 Geo. 3".

Acts passed by the Parliament of Great Britain did not have a short title; however, some of these acts have subsequently been given a short title by acts of the Parliament of the United Kingdom (such as the Short Titles Act 1896).

Before the Acts of Parliament (Commencement) Act 1793 came into force on 8 April 1793, acts passed by the Parliament of Great Britain were deemed to have come into effect on the first day of the session in which they were passed. Because of this, the years given in the list below may in fact be the year before a particular act was passed.

== 12 Ann. ==
The third session of the 3rd Parliament of Great Britain, which met from 9 April 1713 until 16 July 1713.

This session was also traditionally cite as 12 Anne, 12 A., 12 Ann. St. 1 (Ruffhead's Statutes at Large) or 12 A. St. 1.

=== Public acts ===
| Short title | Citation | Royal assent |
Long title
| Land Tax Act 1712 (repealed) | 12 Ann. c. 1 (Note: This is the citation in The Statutes of the Realm.); 12 Ann. St. 1. c. 1 (Note: This is the citation in The Statutes at Large.) | 4 May 1713 |
An Act for granting an Aid to Her Majesty, to be raised by a Land Tax in Great Britain, for the Service of the Year One Thousand Seven Hundred and Thirteen. (Repealed by Statute Law Revision Act 1867 (30 & 31 Vict. c. 59))
| Taxation, etc. Act 1712 (repealed) | 12 Ann. c. 2; 12 Ann. St. 1. c. 2 | 10 June 1713 |
An Act for granting to Her Majesty Duties upon Malt, Mum, Cyder, and Perry, for the Service of the Year One Thousand Seven Hundred and Thirteen; and for making forth Duplicates of Lottery Tickets lost, burnt, or destroyed; and for enlarging the Time for adjusting Claims in several Lottery Acts, and to punish the counterfeiting or forging of Lottery Orders; and for explaining a late Act (Note: Taxation Act 1711 (10 Ann. c. 18)) in relation to Stamp Duties on Customary Estates which pass by Deed and Copy. (Repealed by Statute Law Revision Act 1867 (30 & 31 Vict. c. 59))
| Public Accounts Act 1712 (repealed) | 12 Ann. c. 3; 12 Ann. St. 1. c. 3 | 10 June 1713 |
An Act to revive and continue the Act (Note: Public Accounts Act 1710 (9 Ann. c. 18)) for taking, examining, and stating, the Public Accompts of the Kingdom; and also to continue the Act (Note: Debts due to the Army Act 1711 (10 Ann. c. 38)) for appointing Commissioners, to take, examine, and determine, the Debts due to the Army, Transport Service, and Sick and Wounded. (Repealed by Statute Law Revision Act 1867 (30 & 31 Vict. c. 59))
| West Riding Inclosures Act 1712 | 12 Ann. c. 4; 12 Ann. St. 1. c. 4 | 10 June 1713 |
An Act for making Enclosures of some Part of the Common Grounds in the West Riding of the County of York, for the endowing poor Vicarages and Chapelries, for the better Support of their Ministers.
| Parliament Act 1712 (repealed) | 12 Ann. c. 5; 12 Ann. St. 1. c. 5 | 6 July 1713 |
An Act to explain a Clause in an Act of the last Session of Parliament, intituled, "An Act for the more effectual preventing fraudulent Conveyances, in order to multiply Votes for the electing Knights of Shires to serve in Parliament," (Note: Elections (Fraudulent Conveyances) Act 1711 (10 Ann. c. 31)) as far as the same relates to the ascertaining the Value of Freeholds of Forty Shillings per Annum. (Repealed by Statute Law Revision Act 1867 (30 & 31 Vict. c. 59))
| Parliament (No. 2) Act 1712 (repealed) | 12 Ann. c. 6; 12 Ann. St. 1. c. 6 | 6 July 1713 |
An Act for the better regulating the Elections of Members to serve in Parliament for that Part of Great Britain called Scotland. (Repealed by Statute Law Revision Act 1867 (30 & 31 Vict. c. 59))
| Robberies in Houses Act 1712 (repealed) | 12 Ann. c. 7; 12 Ann. St. 1. c. 7 | 6 July 1713 |
An Act for the more effectual preventing and punishing Robberies that shall be committed in Houses. (Repealed for England and Wales by Criminal Statutes Repeal Act 1827 (7 & 8 Geo. 4. c. 27) and for India by Criminal Law (India) Act 1828 (9 Geo. 4. c. 74))
| Militia Act 1712 (repealed) | 12 Ann. c. 8; 12 Ann. St. 1. c. 8 | 6 July 1713 |
An Act for raising the Militia for the Year One Thousand Seven Hundred and Thirteen, although the Month's Pay formerly advanced be not re-paid. (Repealed by Statute Law Revision Act 1867 (30 & 31 Vict. c. 59))
| Importation Act 1712 (repealed) | 12 Ann. c. 9; 12 Ann. St. 1. c. 9 | 6 July 1713 |
An Act for continuing the Act made in the Third and Fourth Years of the Reign of Her present Majesty, intituled, "An Act for encouraging the Importation of Naval Stores from Her Majesty's Plantations in America; and for encouraging the Importation of Naval Stores from that Part of Great Britain called Scotland to that Part of Great Britain called England." (Note: Importation Act 1704 (3 & 4 Ann. c. 9)) (Repealed by Statute Law Revision Act 1867 (30 & 31 Vict. c. 59))
| Moss Troopers Act 1712 (repealed) | 12 Ann. c. 10; 12 Ann. St. 1. c. 10 | 6 July 1713 |
An Act for continuing the Acts therein mentioned, for preventing Theft and Rapine upon the Northern Borders of England. (Repealed by Statute Law Revision Act 1867 (30 & 31 Vict. c. 59))
| Public Debt Act 1712 (repealed) | 12 Ann. c. 11; 12 Ann. St. 1. c. 11 | 16 July 1713 |
An Act to raise Twelve Hundred Thousand Pounds, for Public Uses, by circulating a further Sum in Exchequer Bills; and for enabling Her Majesty to raise Five Hundred Thousand Pounds; on the Revenues appointed for Uses of Her Civil Government, to be applied for or towards Payment of such Debts and Arrears owing to Her Servants, Tradesmen, and others, as are therein mentioned. (Repealed by Statute Law Revision Act 1867 (30 & 31 Vict. c. 59))
| Sail Cloth Manufacture Act 1712 (repealed) | 12 Ann. c. 12; 12 Ann. St. 1. c. 16 | 16 July 1713 |
An Act for the better Encouragement of the making of Sail Cloth in Great Britain. (Repealed by Statute Law Revision Act 1867 (30 & 31 Vict. c. 59))
| Mutiny Act 1712 (repealed) | 12 Ann. c. 13; 12 Ann. St. 1. c. 12 | 16 July 1713 |
An Act for the better regulating the Forces to be continued in Her Majesty's Service; and for the Payment of the said Forces, and of their Quarters. (Repealed by Statute Law Revision Act 1867 (30 & 31 Vict. c. 59))
| Exercises of Trades Act 1712 (repealed) | 12 Ann. c. 14; 12 Ann. St. 1. c. 13 | 16 July 1713 |
An Act to enable such Officers and Soldiers as have been in Her Majesty's Service during the late War to exercise Trades; and for Officers to accompt with their Soldiers. (Repealed by Statute Law Revision Act 1867 (30 & 31 Vict. c. 59))
| Hackney Chairs Act 1712 (repealed) | 12 Ann. c. 15; 12 Ann. St. 1. c. 14 | 16 July 1713 |
An Act for explaining the Acts for licensing Hackney Chairs. (Repealed by London Hackney Carriage Act 1831 (1 & 2 Will. 4. c. 22))
| Parliament (No. 3) Act 1712 (repealed) | 12 Ann. c. 16; 12 Ann. St. 1. c. 15 | 16 July 1713 |
An Act for making perpetual an Act, made in the Seventh Year of the Reign of the late King William, intituled, "An Act to prevent false and double Returns of Members to serve in Parliament." (Note: Parliamentary Elections (Returns) Act 1695 (7 & 8 Will. 3. c. 7)) (Repealed by Statute Law Revision Act 1867 (30 & 31 Vict. c. 59))
| Church in Strand on Maypole Site (Stepney Advowsons) Act 1712 | 12 Ann. c. 17; 12 Ann. St. 1. c. 17 | 16 July 1713 |
An Act to vest in the Commissioners for building Fifty new Churches in and about London and Westminster, and Suburbs thereof, as much of the Street near The May Pole in The Strand, in the County of Middlesex, as shall be sufficient to build One of the said Churches upon; and for restoring to the Principal and Scholars of King's Hall, and College of Brazen Nose, in the University of Oxon, their Right of Presentation to Churches and Chapels in Stepney Parish.
| Poor Act 1712 (repealed) | 12 Ann. c. 18; 12 Ann. St. 1. c. 18 | 16 July 1713 |
An Act for making perpetual the Act made in the Thirteenth and Fourteenth Years of the Reign of the late King Charles the Second, intituled, "An Act for the better Relief of the Poor of this Kingdom"; (Note: Poor Relief Act 1662 (14 Cha. 2. c. 12)) and that Persons bound Apprentices to, or being hired Servants with, Persons coming with Certificates, shall not gain Settlements by such Services or Apprenticeships; and for making perpetual the Act made in the Sixth Year of Her present Majesty's Reign, intituled, "An Act for the Importation of Cochineal, from any Ports in Spain during the present War, and Six Months longer"; (Note: Importation Act 1707 (6 Ann. c. 60)) and for reviving a Clause in an Act, made in the Ninth and Tenth Years of the Reign of the late King William, intituled, "An Act for settling the Trade to Africa", (Note: Trade with Africa Act 1697 (9 Will. 3. c. 26)) for allowing Foreign Copper Bars imported to be exported. (Repealed by Statute Law Revision Act 1867 (30 & 31 Vict. c. 59))
| Shoreditch Highways Act 1712 (repealed) | 12 Ann. c. 19; 12 Ann. St. 1. c. 1 Pr. | 10 June 1713 |
An Act for repairing, the Highway or Road, from the Stones-end, in the Parish of St. Leonard Shoreditch, in the County of Middlesex, to the furthermost Part of the Northern Road in the Parish of Endfield, in the same County, next to the Parish of Cheshunt, in the County of Hertford. (Repealed by Middlesex Roads Act 1789 (29 Geo. 3. c. 96) and Roads from Stones End and from Newington Green Act 1815 (55 Geo. 3. c. lix))

=== Private acts ===
| Short title | Citation | Royal assent |
Long title
| Earl of Thomond's Estate Act 1712 | 12 Ann. c. 1 Pr. | 10 June 1713 |
An Act for confirming several Grants in Feefarm, made by Henry Earl of Thomond, by virtue of, or since the passing, a former Act of Parliament; (Note: Earl of Thomond's Estate Act 1710 (9 Ann. c. 8 Pr.)) and for giving some Ease and Relief to the Purchasers under or since the said former Act.
| Brownlow's Estate Act 1712 | 12 Ann. c. 2 Pr. | 10 June 1713 |
An Act for confirming Articles, and vesting the Manor of Kirby Underwood, in the County of Lincoln, and other Manors, Lands, and Hereditaments, thereby agreed to be sold, in Trustees, for discharging the Debts of Sir John Brownlow Baronet, deceased, and his Daughters Portions, and other Purposes in the said Articles mentioned.
| Stourton (Wiltshire) manor and advowson, and lands belonging to the manor: barring of entail. | 12 Ann. c. 3 Pr. | 10 June 1713 |
An Act for divesting the Crown of the Remainder in Fee Simple of and in the Manor and Advowson of Stourton, in the County of Wilts, and several Lands, Tenements, and Hereditaments, to the same Manor belonging, expectant on certain Estates Tail; and for vesting the same in certain other Persons, therein named, to the Intent the same may be barred by proper Methods in Law, for the Purposes therein mentioned.
| Wrey's Estate Act 1712 | 12 Ann. c. 4 Pr. | 10 June 1713 |
An Act to enable Trustees to sell some Outparts of the Estate of Sir Bourchier Wrey Baronet, in the County of Devon, for the Purposes therein mentioned.
| Enabling William Harvey and William Harvey his son to settle a jointure and grant a lease, and sale of lands in Suffolk to raise portions for William the elder's daughters. | 12 Ann. c. 5 Pr. | 10 June 1713 |
An Act to enable William Harvey the Elder, Esquire, and William Harvey Esquire his Son, to settle a Jointure, and grant a Lease; and for vesting the Inheritance, after a Term of Five Hundred Years, of Lands in Suffolk, in Trustees, to be sold, for raising Portions for his Daughters.
| Exchange of Charlton parsonage house and adjoining close in lieu of another house and lands in Kent. | 12 Ann. c. 6 Pr. | 10 June 1713 |
An Act for the Exchange of the Parsonagehouse at Charlton, in Kent, and Close thereto adjoining, in Lieu of another House and Lands there.
| Stockton Parish Act 1712 | 12 Ann. c. 7 Pr. | 10 June 1713 |
An Act for making the Chapelry of Stockton, in the County of Durham, a distinct Parish.
| Enden's Naturalization Act 1712 | 12 Ann. c. 8 Pr. | 10 June 1713 |
An Act for naturalizing Lewis Vanden Enden.
| Better enabling James Earl of Salisbury and his trustees to sell certain manors and lands in Northamptonshire and Dorset and a fee farm rent for the purposes of the Act. | 12 Ann. c. 9 Pr. | 6 July 1713 |
An Act for better enabling James Earl of Salisbury and his Trustees to make Sale of certain Manors, Lands, and Hereditaments, in the Counties of Northampton and Dorset, and a Fee-farm Rent, for the Purposes in the said Act mentioned.
| Manor of Morley (Yorkshire) Act 1712 | 12 Ann. c. 10 Pr. | 6 July 1713 |
An Act for the Sale of the Reversion and Inheritance of the Manor of Morley, in the County of York, together with a Term of Five Hundred Years therein, decreed to be sold, for Payment of Debts; and also for exchanging a Fee-farm Rent of the Coheirs of William late Marquis of Halifax, issuing out of Part of Leiffield Forest, in Rutlandshire, for a Fee-farm Rent of Daniel Earl of Nottingham, issuing out of Harting fordbury, in Hertfordshire; and for settling the same to such Uses as the said Fee-farm Rent in Rutlandshire was settled.
| Earl of Coventry's Estate Act 1712 | 12 Ann. c. 11 Pr. | 6 July 1713 |
An Act for raising Five Thousand Pounds Portion, out of several Lands in Middlesex and Warwickshire charged therewith (being the Estate of the Right Honourable Gilbert Earl of Coventry); and for paying the same to the Lady Ann Coventry his Daughter, at her Marriage, though the same should be before her Age of Eighteen Years.
| Burgoyne's Estate Act 1712 | 12 Ann. c. 12 Pr. | 6 July 1713 |
An Act for vesting divers Lands and Hereditaments, in the Counties of Warwick and Bedford, (late the Estate of Sir Roger Burgoyne Baronet, deceased,) in Trustees, for divers Purposes therein mentioned.
| Holland's Estate Act 1712 | 12 Ann. c. 13 Pr. | 6 July 1713 |
An Act for discharging the Manors or Lordships of Bexwell and Tinworth, in the County of Norfolk, from the several Uses, Trusts, and Estates, thereof limited in and by the Marriage Settlement of Sir John Holland Baronet with the Lady Rebecca his Wife; and for settling divers other Manors, Messuages, Lands, Tenements, and Hereditaments, of a greater Value, and which lie more convenient, in the same County, in Lieu thereof.
| Enabling Henry Lee the younger or Lee Warner to make a jointure upon marriage. | 12 Ann. c. 14 Pr. | 6 July 1713 |
An Act for enabling Henry Lee the Younger, alias Lee Warner, to make a Jointure, upon his Marriage.
| Uniting and consolidating the rectories, advowsons and parishes of Melton St. Mary's and Melton All Saints in Norwich diocese (Norfolk). | 12 Ann. c. 15 Pr. | 6 July 1713 |
An Act for uniting and consolidating the Rectories, Advowsons, and Parishes, of Melton St. Maries and Melton All Saints, in the Diocese of Norwich, in the County of Norfolk.
| Byde's Estate Act 1712 | 12 Ann. c. 16 Pr. | 6 July 1713 |
An Act to amend several Defects in an Act of Parliament made in the Tenth Year of the Reign of His late Majesty King William the Third, (Note: Byde's Estate Act 1698 (10 Will. 3. c. 40 Pr.)) (intituled, An Act to enable Thomas Byde Esquire, an Infant, with the Consent of his Guardians and next Relations, to make a Contract for the buying in his Mother's Jointure; and to sell a small Estate, in Great Amwell, in the County of Hertford; and likewise for the securing and raising a Portion for Barbara Byde Spinster, Sister of the said Thomas Byde, and for other Purposes in the said Act mentioned;) and to enable the said Thomas Byde to raise Monies, and to make Leases, for the Purposes in the present Act mentioned.
| Enabling William Booth to sell lands in Cheshire for payment of his brother's debts and for applying the surplus to payment of his own debts. | 12 Ann. c. 17 Pr. | 6 July 1713 |
An Act to enable William Booth Gentleman to sell certain Lands and Hereditaments, in the County of Chester, for Payment of the Debts of his Brother, with whom, and for which, he stands bound; and for applying the Surplus (if any) of the Money raised for such Purpose, towards Payment of his own proper Debts.
| Enabling Charles Earl of Arran to take the oath as Master of the Ordnance in Ireland in the Court of Exchequer at Westminster, and to qualify himself for the legal enjoyment of that office. | 12 Ann. c. 18 Pr. | 16 July 1713 |
An Act to enable the Right Honourable Charles Lord Weston, and Earl of Arran in the Kingdom of Ireland, to take the Oath of Office, as Master of Her Majesty's Ordnance in the Kingdom of Ireland, before the Barons of Her Majesty's Court of Exchequer at Westminster; and to qualify himself for the legal Enjoyment of the said Office.
| Enabling Sir Charles Gresham to raise £5000 and maintenance for his niece Elizabeth and to make provision for his younger children. | 12 Ann. c. 19 Pr. | 16 July 1713 |
An Act for enabling Sir Charles Gresham Baronet to raise the Sum of Five Thousand Pounds, and Interest, and Maintenance for Elizabeth the Daughter of his Brother Sir Edward Gresham Baronet, deceased, and to make Provision for his Younger Children.
| Enabling Sir Edward Leighton to charge his estate with £4000 for the purposes mentioned. | 12 Ann. c. 20 Pr. | 16 July 1713 |
An Act to enable Sir Edward Leighton Baronet to charge his Estate with Four Thousand Pounds (preserable to Six Thousand Pounds already charged thereupon by his Marriage Settlement) for the Purposes therein mentioned.
| John Constable's Estate Act 1712 | 12 Ann. c. 21 Pr. | 16 July 1713 |
An Act for Sale of several Lands and Tenements of John Constable Gentleman, in the Parish of Ockley, in the County of Surrey, for Payment of his Debts; and for settling other Lands in the same County, of a better Value, to the same Uses, in Lieu thereof.
| Enabling John Harrington and Dorothy his wife, and John's son Charles, to sell the reversion of messuages and tenements in Liverpool, being Dorothy's inheritance, for payment of debts, and settling an equivalent on Dorothy. | 12 Ann. c. 22 Pr. | 16 July 1713 |
An Act to enable John Harrington Esquire and Dorothy his Wife, and Charles Harrington Gentleman, Son and Heir Apparent of the said John Harrington, to sell the Reversion of several Messuages and Tenements in Liverpole, in the County of Lancaster, being the Inheritance of the said Dorothy, for Payment of their Debts; and settling an Equivalent upon the said Dorothy.
| Enabling Symes Parry to change his name of Parry to Symes. | 12 Ann. c. 23 Pr. | 16 July 1713 |
An Act to enable Symes Parry to change his Name of Parry to Symes, according to the Will of John Symes Esquire, deceased.
| Naturalization of Simon Descury, Peter Ribot, Peter Laffite and Others Act 1712 | 12 Ann. c. 24 Pr. | 16 July 1713 |
An Act to naturalize Simon Descury, Peter Ribot, Peter Lafitte, and others.

=== Sources ===
- Raithby, John, ed. (1822). "Anno 12° Annæ, A.D. 1712". The Statutes of the Realm. Vol. 9: The Statutes of the Seventh to the Thirteenth Years of the Reign of Queen Anne. pp. 723–803 – via Internet Archive.
- Raithby, John, ed. (1822). "Anno 12° Annæ, A.D. 1712". The Statutes of the Realm. Vol. 9: The Statutes of the Seventh to the Thirteenth Years of the Reign of Queen Anne. pp. 723–803 – via HathiTrust.
- Pickering, Danby, ed. (1764). "Anno duodecimo Annæ". The Statutes at Large. Vol. 13: From the Twelfth Year of Queen Anne to the Fifth Year of King George I. Cambridge: Joseph Bentham. pp. 1–58 – via Internet Archive.
- Pickering, Danby, ed. (1764). "Anno duodecimo Annæ". The Statutes at Large. Vol. 13: From the Twelfth Year of Queen Anne to the Fifth Year of King George I. Cambridge: Joseph Bentham. pp. 1–58 – via Internet Archive.
- Pickering, Danby, ed. (1764). "Anno duodecimo Annæ". The Statutes at Large. Vol. 13: From the Twelfth Year of Queen Anne to the Fifth Year of King George I. Cambridge: Joseph Bentham. pp. 1–58 – via Internet Archive.
- Journals of the House of Commons. Vol. 17. London: His Majesty's Stationery Office. 1803. pp. 277–467 – via Google Books.
- Chronological Table of and Index to the Statutes. Vol. 1: To the End of the Session 59 Vict. Sess. 2 (1895) (13th ed.). London: Her Majesty's Stationery Office. 1896. p. 91-92 – via Google Books.

== See also ==
- List of acts of the Parliament of Great Britain
