= List of acts of the Parliament of Great Britain from 1724 =

This is a complete list of acts of the Parliament of Great Britain for the year 1724.

For acts passed until 1707, see the list of acts of the Parliament of England and the list of acts of the Parliament of Scotland. See also the list of acts of the Parliament of Ireland.

For acts passed from 1801 onwards, see the list of acts of the Parliament of the United Kingdom. For acts of the devolved parliaments and assemblies in the United Kingdom, see the list of acts of the Scottish Parliament, the list of acts of the Northern Ireland Assembly, and the list of acts and measures of Senedd Cymru; see also the list of acts of the Parliament of Northern Ireland.

The number shown after each act's title is its chapter number. Acts are cited using this number, preceded by the year(s) of the reign during which the relevant parliamentary session was held; thus the Union with Ireland Act 1800 is cited as "39 & 40 Geo. 3. c. 67", meaning the 67th act passed during the session that started in the 39th year of the reign of George III and which finished in the 40th year of that reign. Note that the modern convention is to use Arabic numerals in citations (thus "41 Geo. 3" rather than "41 Geo. III"). Acts of the last session of the Parliament of Great Britain and the first session of the Parliament of the United Kingdom are both cited as "41 Geo. 3".

Acts passed by the Parliament of Great Britain did not have a short title; however, some of these acts have subsequently been given a short title by acts of the Parliament of the United Kingdom (such as the Short Titles Act 1896).

Before the Acts of Parliament (Commencement) Act 1793 came into force on 8 April 1793, acts passed by the Parliament of Great Britain were deemed to have come into effect on the first day of the session in which they were passed. Because of this, the years given in the list below may in fact be the year before a particular act was passed.

== 11 Geo. 1 ==
The third session of the 6th Parliament of Great Britain, which met from 12 November 1724 until 31 May 1725.

This session was also traditionally cited as 11 G. 1.

=== Public acts ===
Short title	Citation	Royal assent
Long title
Land Tax Act 1724 (repealed)	11 Geo. 1. c. 1	16 December 1724
An Act for granting an Aid to His Majesty, by a Land Tax, to be raised in Great Britain, for the Service of the Year One Thousand Seven Hundred Twenty-five. (Repealed by Statute Law Revision Act 1867 (30 & 31 Vict. c. 59))
Indemnity (Masters in Chancery) Act 1724 (repealed)	11 Geo. 1. c. 2	17 February 1725
An Act for indemnifying the Masters in Chancery, upon their discovering what Consideration, Price, or Gratuity, they paid, or agreed to pay, for the Purchase of, or for their Admission to, their respective Offices. (Repealed by Statute Law Revision Act 1867 (30 & 31 Vict. c. 59))
Margate Pier Act 1724	11 Geo. 1. c. 3	17 February 1725
An Act to enable the Pier Wardens of the Town of Margate, in the County of Kent, more effectually to recover the ancient and accustomary Droits, for the Support and Maintenance of the said Pier.
Municipal Elections Act 1724 (repealed)	11 Geo. 1. c. 4	17 February 1725
An Act for preventing the Inconveniencies arising for Want of Elections of Mayors or other Chief Magistrates of Boroughs or Corporations being made upon the Days appointed by Charter or Usage for that Purpose; and directing in what Manner such Elections shall be afterwards made. (Repealed by Statute Law Revision Act 1887 (50 & 51 Vict. c. 59))
Kent Roads Act 1724 (repealed)	11 Geo. 1. c. 5	17 February 1725
An Act for enlarging the Term granted by an Act made in the Tenth Year of Her late Majesty's Reign, (Note: Kent Roads Act 1711 (10 Ann. c. 16)) for amending and maintaining the Road between Northfleet, Gravesend, and Rochester, in the County of Kent; and for explaining the same Act; and for appropriating Part of the Money arising thereby towards repairing the Road between the Town of Chatham and Boughton under the Blean, in the said County of Kent. (Repealed by Road from Dartford to Strood Act 1822 (3 Geo. 4. c. lxx))
Mutiny Act 1724 (repealed)	11 Geo. 1. c. 6	24 March 1725
An Act for punishing Mutiny and Desertion; and for the better Payment of the Army and their Quarters. (Repealed by Statute Law Revision Act 1867 (30 & 31 Vict. c. 59))
Customs Act 1724 (repealed)	11 Geo. 1. c. 7	24 March 1725
An Act for rating such unrated Goods and Merchandizes as are usually imported into this Kingdom, and pay Duty ad Valorem, upon the Oath of the Importer; and for ascertaining the Value of all Goods and Merchandizes not inserted in the former or present Book of Rates; and for repealing certain Duties upon Drugs and Rags; and for continuing the Duty upon Apples; and for ascertaining the Method of admeasuring Pictures imported. (Repealed by Statute Law Revision Act 1867 (30 & 31 Vict. c. 59))
Taxation Act 1724 (repealed)	11 Geo. 1. c. 8	24 March 1725
An Act for continuing the Duties on Malt, Mum, Cyder, and Perry, in that Part of Great Britain called England; and for granting to His Majesty certain Duties upon Malt, Mum, Cyder, and Perry, in that Part of Great Britain called Scotland, for the Service of the Year One Thousand Seven Hundred and Twenty-five; and for transferring the Deficiency of a late Malt Act (Note: Taxation, etc. Act 1723 (10 Geo. 1. c. 2)) to this Act; and for explaining a late Act (Note: Taxation Act 1711 (10 Ann. c. 18)) in relation to Stamp Duties on News Papers; and for appropriating the Supplies granted in this Session of Parliament; and for disposing certain Overplus Money to proper Objects of Charity; and for making forth Duplicates of Exchequer Bills, Lottery Tickets and Orders, lost, burnt, or otherwise destroyed; and for giving further Time to Clerks and Apprentices to pay Duties omitted to be paid for their Indentures and Contracts. (Repealed by Statute Law Revision Act 1867 (30 & 31 Vict. c. 59))
National Debt Reduction Act 1724 (repealed)	11 Geo. 1. c. 9	24 March 1725
An Act for continuing the several Annuities of Eighty-eight Thousand Seven Hundred and Fifty-one Pounds Seven Shillings and Ten Pence Halfpenny, and One Hundred Thousand Pounds, to the Bank of England, until Midsummer One Thousand Seven Hundred Twenty-seven; and from thence, for reducing the same to Seventy-one Thousand and One Pounds Two Shillings and Three Pence Three Farthings, and Eighty Thousand Pounds, redeemable by Parliament; and for preventing the uttering of forged, counterfeited, or erased Bank Bills or Notes. (Repealed by Statute Law Revision Act 1966 (c. 5))
Stamford Bridge (Replacement and Tolls) Act 1724 (repealed)	11 Geo. 1. c. 10	24 March 1725
An Act to enable the Justices of the Peace for the East Riding of the County of York to take down the County Bridge, called Stanford Bridge; and to build a Stone Bridge, at a more convenient Place, over the River Darwent, in the said Riding, instead thereof. (Repealed by Statute Law Revision Act 1950 (14 Geo. 6. c. 6))
Hertford and Ware Roads Act 1724 (repealed)	11 Geo. 1. c. 11	24 March 1725
An Act for repairing the Roads therein mentioned, from the Parish of Enfield, in the County of Middlesex, to the Town of Hertford, and to the great Bridge in Ware, in the County of Hertford. (Repealed by Hertford and Ware Roads Act 1813 (53 Geo. 3. c. xxvii) and Roads from Hertford and Ware Act 1833 (3 & 4 Will. 4. c. xlii))
Charities of Thomas Guy Act 1724	11 Geo. 1. c. 12	24 March 1725
An Act for incorporating the Executors of the last Will and Testament of Thomas Guy, late of the City of London, Esquire, deceased, and others, in order to the better Management and Disposition of the Charities given by his said last Will.
Derbyshire Roads Act 1724 (repealed)	11 Geo. 1. c. 13	24 March 1725
An Act for repairing and widening the Road from Sherbrooke Hill, near Buxton, and Chappel in the Frith, in the County of Derby, to Manchester, in the County of Lancaster. (Repealed by Manchester to Buxton Road Act 1793 (33 Geo. 3. c. 171))
Cambridge Roads Act 1724 (repealed)	11 Geo. 1. c. 14	24 March 1725
An Act for repairing part of the Road from London to Cambridge, beginning at the End of the Parish of Foulmire, in the said County, next to Barly, in the County of Hertford, and ending at the Pavement in Trumpington Street, in the Town of Cambridge. (Repealed by Cambridge Roads Act 1790 (30 Geo. 3. c. 94))
Kent Roads (No. 2) Act 1724 (repealed)	11 Geo. 1. c. 15	24 March 1725
An Act for enlarging the Term granted by an Act made in the Eighth Year of the Reign of Her late Majesty Queen Anne, intituled, "An Act for repairing and amending the Highways leading from Seven Oaks to Woodsgate and Tunbridge Wells, in the County of Kent;" (Note: Sevenoaks and Tunbridge Highways Act 1709 (8 Ann. c. 20)) and for explaining and making more effectual the same Act; and for amending, out of the Tolls and Duties arising by the said Act and this present Act, the Highways leading from Woodsgate aforesaid to Kippings Cross, in the Parish of Brenchly, in the said County of Kent. (Repealed by Sevenoaks and Tunbridge Wells Roads Act 1814 (54 Geo. 3. c. clxxiv))
Parton Harbour Act 1724	11 Geo. 1. c. 16	24 March 1725
An Act for re-building the Pier and Harbour of Parton, in the County of Cumberland.
National Debt Act 1724 (repealed)	11 Geo. 1. c. 17	20 April 1725
An Act for redeeming the Annuities of Twenty-five Thousand Pounds per Annum, charged on the Civil List Revenues by an Act of the Seventh Year of His Majesty's Reign; (Note: Pension Duties Act 1720 (7 Geo. 1. St. 1. c. 27)) and for discharging the Debts and Arrears due from His Majesty to His Servants, Tradesmen, and others. (Repealed by Statute Law Revision Act 1870 (33 & 34 Vict. c. 69))
City of London Elections Act 1724	11 Geo. 1. c. 18	20 April 1725
An Act for regulating Elections within the City of London; and for preserving the Peace, good Order, and Government, of the said City.
River Nene (Norfolk) Navigation Act 1724 (repealed)	11 Geo. 1. c. 19	20 April 1725
An Act for making more effectual an Act passed in the Parliament, holden in the Twelfth Year of the Reign of Her late Majesty Queen Anne, intituled, "An Act for making the River Nine, or Nen, running from Northampton to Peterborough, navigable." (Note: River Nene (Northampton to Peterborough) Navigation Act 1713 (13 Ann. c. 19)) (Repealed by Nene Valley Drainage and Navigation Improvement Act 1852 (15 & 16 Vict. c. cxxviii))
Bedfordshire Roads Act 1724 (repealed)	11 Geo. 1. c. 20	20 April 1725
An Act for repairing and amending the Road from Biggleswade, in the County of Bedford, to Bugden, and through Alconberry, to the Top of Alconberry Hill, or Cross Post leading into Sautery Lane, on the York and Edinburgh Road; and from the said Town of Bugden, to the Town of Huntingdon; and from Cross Hall, in Eaton Sokon, in the said County of Bedford, to Great Stoughton Common, in the said County of Huntingdon. (Repealed by Biggleswade and Alconbury Hill Road Act 1816 (56 Geo. 3. c. lii))
Insolvent Debtors Relief Act 1724 (repealed)	11 Geo. 1. c. 21	31 May 1725
An Act for the Relief of Insolvent Debtors. (Repealed by Statute Law Revision Act 1867 (30 & 31 Vict. c. 59))
Shelterers in Wapping, Stepney, etc. Act 1724 (repealed)	11 Geo. 1. c. 22	31 May 1725
An Act to prevent Violences and Outrages being committed by any Persons, under Pretence of sheltering themselves from Debt, or any Process of Law, within the Hamlet of Wapping, Stepney, or elsewhere within the Weekly Bills of Mortality. (Repealed by Statute Law Revision Act 1867 (30 & 31 Vict. c. 59))
Keeping of Gunpowder Act 1724 (repealed)	11 Geo. 1. c. 23	31 May 1725
An Act for making more effectual an Act passed in the Fifth Year of His Majesty's Reign, intituled, "An Act for preventing the Mischiefs which may happen by keeping too great Quantities of Gunpowder in or near the Cities of London and Westminster, or the Suburbs thereof." (Note: Keeping of Gunpowder Act 1718 (5 Geo. 1. c. 26)) (Repealed by Keeping, etc., of Gunpowder Act 1771 (11 Geo. 3. c. 35))
Cloth Manufacturer Act 1724 (repealed)	11 Geo. 1. c. 24	31 May 1725
An Act for the better regulating the Manufacture of Cloth, in the West Riding of the County of York. (Repealed by Cloth Manufacture, Yorkshire Act 1765 (5 Geo. 3. c. 51))
Old Stratford to Dunchurch Road Act 1724 (repealed)	11 Geo. 1. c. 25	31 May 1725
An Act for enlarging the Term granted by an Act passed in the Sixth Year of the Reign of Her late Majesty Queen Anne, intituled, "An Act for repairing the Highways from Old Stratford, in the County of Northampton, to Dunchurch, in the County of Warwick;" (Note: Old Stratford to Dunchurch Road Act 1707 (6 Ann. c. 77)) and for making the same more effectual. (Repealed by Old Stratford to Dunchurch Road Act 1775 (15 Geo. 3. c. 73))
Bail in Criminal Cases (Scotland) Act 1724 or the Disarming Act 1725 (repealed)	11 Geo. 1. c. 26	31 May 1725
An Act for more effectual disarming The Highlands, in that Part of Great Britain called Scotland; and for the better securing the Peace and Quiet of that Part of the Kingdom. (Repealed by Statute Law Revision Act 1892 (55 & 56 Vict. c. 19))
Wiltshire Roads Act 1724 (repealed)	11 Geo. 1. c. 27	31 May 1725
An Act for enlarging the Term granted by an Act passed in the Fifth Year of the Reign of Her late Majesty Queen Anne, intituled, "An Act for repairing the Highways between Sheppards Shord and The Devizes, and between the Top of Ashlington Hill and Rowdford, in the County of Wilts;" (Note: Wiltshire Highways Act 1706 (6 Ann. c. 26)) and for explaining the said Act, and making the same more effectual and extensive. (Repealed by Devizes Roads Act 1797 (37 Geo. 3. c. 154))
Mischief by Fire Act 1724 or the London Building Act 1724 (repealed)	11 Geo. 1. c. 28	31 May 1725
An Act for the better regulating of Buildings, and to prevent Mischiefs that may happen by Fire, within the Weekly Bills of Mortality, and other Places therein mentioned. (Repealed by Statute Law Revision Act 1867 (30 & 31 Vict. c. 59))
Continuance of Laws, etc. Act 1724 (repealed)	11 Geo. 1. c. 29	31 May 1725
An Act to continue several Acts therein mentioned, for preventing Frauds committed by Bankrupts; for encouraging the Silk Manufactures of this Kingdom; for preventing the clandestine Running of Goods; for making Copper Ore of the British Plantations an enumerated Commodity; and for explaining and amending a late Act, (Note: Stranded Ships, etc. Act 1717 (4 Geo. 1. c. 12)) for more effectual Punishment of such as shall wilfully burn or destroy Ships. (Repealed by Statute Law Revision Act 1867 (30 & 31 Vict. c. 59))
Adulteration of Tea and Coffee Act 1724 (repealed)	11 Geo. 1. c. 30	31 May 1725
An Act for more effectual preventing Frauds and Abuses in the Public Revenues; for preventing Frauds in the Salt Duties; and for giving Relief for Salt used in the curing of Salmon and Cod-fish, in the Year One Thousand Seven Hundred and Nineteen, exported from that Part of Great Britain called Scotland; for enabling the Insurance Companies to plead the General Issue in Actions brought against them; and for securing the Stamp Duties upon Policies of Insurance. (Repealed by Statute Law Revision Act 1958 (6 & 7 Eliz. 2. c. 46))

=== Private acts ===
Short title	Citation	Royal assent
Long title
Younge's Divorce Act 1724	11 Geo. 1. c. 1 Pr.	16 December 1724
An Act to dissolve the Marriage of William Yonge Esquire with Mary Heathcote; and to enable him to marry again; and for other Purposes therein mentioned.
Ball's Name Act 1724	11 Geo. 1. c. 2 Pr.	16 December 1724
An Act to enable William Ball Esquire and his Heirs to take and use the Surname of Basil.
Leigh's Name Act 1724	11 Geo. 1. c. 3 Pr.	16 December 1724
An Act to enable Thomas Legh alias Pennington Esquire, and his Issue Male, to change their Surname to Legh, according to the Settlement of Peter Legh Esquire, deceased.
Naturalization of John Tolet, John Horst and others Act 1724	11 Geo. 1. c. 4 Pr.	16 December 1724
An Act to naturalize John Tolet, John Herman Zur Horst, and others.
Croston Finney Inclosure Act 1724	11 Geo. 1. c. 5 Pr.	17 February 1725
An Act to enclose the Common and Tract of Land called Croston Finney, in the County of Lancaster.
Lord Saint John's Estate Act 1724	11 Geo. 1. c. 6 Pr.	17 February 1725
An Act to enable John Lord St. John to settle a Jointure on such Woman as he shall marry; and to make Provision for the Daughters and Younger Children of such Marriage, out of the Estate devised to him by the Will of William Lord St. John, deceased.
Monson Estate Act 1724	11 Geo. 1. c. 7 Pr.	17 February 1725
An Act to confirm and establish Articles of Agreement, between Archibald Hamilton Esquire (commonly called Lord Archibald Hamilton) of the one Part, and George Parker Esquire (commonly called Lord Parker) and other Trustees of a Charity therein mentioned of the other Part, for exchanging certain Lands in the County of Berks, belonging to the said Charity, for other Lands of a greater Value.
Confirming and establishing an agreement between Lord Archibold Hamilton, Lord George Parker and other trustees of a charity therein mentioned for exchange of lands in Berkshire belonging to the charity for others of greater value.	11 Geo. 1. c. 8 Pr.	17 February 1725
An Act to enable Sir William Monson Baronet and George Monson Esquire, and the Survivor of them, together with John Monson Esquire, to convey and settle several Manors and Lands, in the Counties of Lincoln, Hertford, and Nottingham.
Fleetwood's Estate Act 1724	11 Geo. 1. c. 9 Pr.	17 February 1725
An Act for vesting Part of the Estate of Richard Fletewood, late of Rossal, in the County of Lancaster, Esquire, deceased, in Trustees, to be sold, for Payment of his Debts and Legacies.
Puleston's Estate Act 1724	11 Geo. 1. c. 10 Pr.	17 February 1725
An Act for Sale of Part of the Estate of Thomas Puleston Esquire, for discharging Debts and Incumbrances affecting the same.
Banestre's Estate Act 1724	11 Geo. 1. c. 11 Pr.	17 February 1725
An Act for vesting in Trustees the Manors of Hasilton and Turkdean, in the County of Gloucester, late the Estate of Sir William Banastre Knight, deceased; to be sold, for Payment of his Debts; and for making Provision for his Daughters and Coheirs, pursuant to their several Marriage Articles; and for other Purposes in the said Act mentioned.
Stephen Hales' and Henry Carrington's Estates Act 1724	11 Geo. 1. c. 12 Pr.	17 February 1725
An Act to enable Stephen Hales Clerk and Henry Carrington Gentleman to sell their undivided Moieties of the Freehold, Leasehold, and Copyhold Estates, at Much Hadham, in the County of Hertford, late the Estate of William Newce Esquire, deceased.
Broulhet's Naturalization Act 1724	11 Geo. 1. c. 13 Pr.	17 February 1725
An Act for naturalizing Paul Broulhet.
Naturalization of Jacob Wolfe and Others Act 1724	11 Geo. 1. c. 14 Pr.	17 February 1725
An Act to naturalize Jacob Wolff and others.
Duchess of Bolton's Estate Act 1724	11 Geo. 1. c. 15 Pr.	24 March 1725
An Act for explaining a Power contained in the Settlement of the Dutchess of Bolton's Estate, on her Marriage with the present Duke; and making the same more effectual for the Purposes thereby intended.
Earl Rivers' Estate Act 1724	11 Geo. 1. c. 16 Pr.	24 March 1725
An Act for vesting the Manor and Lands of and in Brignal, in the County of York, late the Estate and Inheritance of Richard Earl Rivers, deceased, in Trustees, to be sold, towards discharging the Incumbrances affecting his Estate in the County of Chester.
Viscount Irwyn's Estate Act 1724	11 Geo. 1. c. 17 Pr.	24 March 1725
An Act to enable Arthur Lord Viscount Irwyn to raise Money, by Mortgage or Sale of certain Estates, in the Counties of York, Lincoln, Oxon, and City of London, for Payment of Debts, Legacies, and Portions, charged thereupon; and to settle the Estates therein mentioned on Henry Ingram Esquire, his next Brother, and his Heirs.
Enabling the Treasury to compound with Edmund Ashby for his part of a debt due to the Crown, on account of his having been surety to Benjamin Blundell, late Receiver General of land tax and house duties in Leicestershire.	11 Geo. 1. c. 18 Pr.	24 March 1725
An Act to enable the Lords Commissioners of the Treasury, or Lord High Treasurer, for the Time being, to compound with Edmund Ashby, for his Part of a Debt due to the Crown, on Account of his having been Surety for Benjamin Blundell, late Receiver General of the Land Tax and Duties on Houses for the County of Leicester.
Clifton's Estate Act 1724	11 Geo. 1. c. 19 Pr.	24 March 1725
An Act to explain and amend an Act passed in the Ninth Year of His present Majesty, intituled, "An Act for vesting the Estates of Sir Gervas Cliston Baronet in Trustees; and to enable him to take an Estate for Life, by Way of Purchase, in Settlements intended to be made of his Estates, on the Marriage of Robert Cliston Esquire, his Son and Heir Apparent. (Note: Clifton's Estate Act 1722 (9 Geo. 1. c. 20 Pr.))
Sir Edward Blacket's Estate Act 1724	11 Geo. 1. c. 20 Pr.	24 March 1725
An Act for vesting Part of the Estate of Sir Edward Blacket Baronet in Trustees, to be sold, for raising Eight Thousand Pounds, charged thereupon by his late Brother's Marriage Settlement.
Swell Inclosure Act 1724	11 Geo. 1. c. 21 Pr.	24 March 1725
An Act for enabling Elizabeth Rushout, Lady of the Manor of Over Swell, in the County of Gloucester, to enclose all and every the Lands lying within the said Manor or Parish of Over Swell, in Pursuance of several Agreements therein mentioned to have been made between the said Elizabeth Rushout and the Rector of the Parish aforesaid; and between the said Elizabeth and the Churchwarden and Parishioners of the said Parish; and to establish the said Agreements.
Bateman's Estate Act 1724	11 Geo. 1. c. 22 Pr.	24 March 1725
An Act to enable James Bateman Esquire to sell the Manor of Tooting Graveney, and all other his Estate, in the County of Surrey; and, with the Monies arising thereby, to purchase the Manors of Well and Alford, and other Lands in the County of Lincoln, to be settled to the same Uses as the said Estate in Surrey stands settled.
Discharge of certain lands at Eccleshall (Staffordshire) from uses and limitations contained in the marriage settlement of Thomas Boothby Skrymsher and settlement of other lands in the county of greater value in lieu.	11 Geo. 1. c. 23 Pr.	24 March 1725
An Act for discharging certain Lands at Eccleshall, in the County of Stafford, from the Uses and Limitations contained in the Marriage Settlement of Thomas Boothby Skyrmsher Esquire; and for settling other Lands in the same County, of greater Value, to the same Uses.
Sale of moiety of Stony Grange Farm in Isle of Ely to Jabez Collier and purchase and settlement of other lands with the proceeds.	11 Geo. 1. c. 24 Pr.	24 March 1725
An Act for Sale of the Moiety of a Farm called Stony Grainge Farm, in the Isle of Ely, to Jabez Collier Gentleman; and for applying the Money arising thereby in the Purchase of other Lands, to be settled to the same Uses.
Hawkins' Estate Act 1724	11 Geo. 1. c. 25 Pr.	24 March 1725
An Act for Sale of an Estate late of Henry Hawkins, Citizen of London, deceased, for the Benefit of his Widow and Children; and other Purposes therein mentioned.
Enabling John Phillips and his issue to take the surname Goodwin.	11 Geo. 1. c. 26 Pr.	24 March 1725
An Act for enabling John Phillips Esquire, and his Issue, to take and use the Surname of Goodwin.
Thorogood's Name Act 1724	11 Geo. 1. c. 27 Pr.	24 March 1725
An Act to enable Simon Thorowgood Gentleman to change his Surname of Thorowgood to that of Lord.
De la Croze's Naturalization Act 1724	11 Geo. 1. c. 28 Pr.	24 March 1725
An Act to naturalize Marie De la Croze.
Duke of Bedford's Estate Act 1724	11 Geo. 1. c. 29 Pr.	20 April 1725
An Act for settling the Estates of the most Noble Wriothesly Duke of Bedford, (Note: Wriothesley Russell, 3rd Duke of Bedford) on his Marriage with the Right Honourable the Lady Anne Egerton, Daughter of the most Noble Scroop Duke of Bridgewater.
Enabling Edmund, Duke of Buckinghamshire and Normanby to grant leases of certain manors and lands.	11 Geo. 1. c. 30 Pr.	20 April 1725
An Act to enable Edmund Duke of Buckinghamshire and Normanby to make Leases (with the Consent of his Guardian and Trustees) of the Manors, Lands, and Estate, therein mentioned.
Duke of Kent's Estates Act 1724	11 Geo. 1. c. 31 Pr.	20 April 1725
An Act for vesting the Estates of the most Noble Henry Duke of Kent, in the Counties of Hereford, Monmouth, and Gloucester, in the said Duke and his Heirs; and for settling his other Estates, in the Counties of Essex, Suffolk, Bedford, Hertford, Northampton, and Leicester, in Lieu thereof.
Westhoughton Inclosure Act 1724	11 Geo. 1. c. 32 Pr.	20 April 1725
An Act to enclose divers Parcels of Waste Grounds, lying and being in Westhaughton, in the County Palatine of Lancaster.
Earl of Shrewsbury's Hospital Act 1724	11 Geo. 1. c. 33 Pr.	20 April 1725
An Act for vesting in Trustees several Lands, Tenements, and Hereditaments, in the Counties of York and Derby, for the Maintenance of the poor Persons in the Hospital of Gilbert Earl of Shrewsbury, long since deceased, situate at Sheffield, in the County of York; and for enlarging the Buildings of the said Hospital, and adding more poor Persons to those already established therein.
Trelawny's Estate Act 1724	11 Geo. 1. c. 34 Pr.	20 April 1725
An Act for vesting in Trustees certain Manors, Lands, and Tenements, in the County of Cornwall, late the Estate of Sir Jonathan Trelawny Baronet (Note: Sir Jonathan Trelawny, 3rd Baronet) (late Lord Bishop of Winchester), deceased, to be sold, for discharging certain Mortgages by him made thereof; and for other Purposes therein mentioned.
Ralph Widdrington's Estate Act 1724	11 Geo. 1. c. 35 Pr.	20 April 1725
An Act for vesting Part of the Estate of Ralph Widdrington Esquire in Trustees, to be sold, for Payment of the Debts of the said Ralph Widdrington.
Enabling trustees therein named to convey lands in Thringston (Leicestershire) in pursuance of articles of agreement designed for that purpose.	11 Geo. 1. c. 36 Pr.	20 April 1725
An Act to enable certain Trustees, therein named, to make a Conveyance of certain Lands in Thringston, in the County of Leicester, in Pursuance of Articles of Agreement entered into for that Purpose.
Confirmation and making effectual an agreement between Anne, widow, William and Anne Hester the younger and vesting in trustees certain messuages and tenements in St Olave's in Southwark (Surrey) to enable them to convey the same pursuant to articles of agreement for sale, and other provisions.	11 Geo. 1. c. 37 Pr.	20 April 1725
An Act for confirming and rendering effectual an Agreement made between Anne Hester Widow, William Hester, and Anne Hester the Younger; and for vesting in Trustees certain Messuages and Tenements, in the Parish of St. Olave in Southwark, in the County of Surrey, to enable them to convey the same, pursuant to Articles of Agreement made for Sale thereof; and for other Purposes therein mentioned.
Sheldon's Estate Act 1724	11 Geo. 1. c. 38 Pr.	20 April 1725
An Act for the Sale of the Manors of Middle Ditchford alias Freemans Ditchford, Guys Ditchford alias Over Ditchford, and other Lands therein mentioned, in the County of Worcester, for Payment of the Debts of Gilbert Sheldon Esquire, deceased; and for making Provision for his Widow, his Children, and Grand-children; and for other Purposes therein mentioned.
Wilkinson's Estate Act 1724	11 Geo. 1. c. 39 Pr.	20 April 1725
An Act to enable James Wilkinson and Trustees to make Leases for One, Two, or Three Lives, or for Years determinable on One, Two, or Three Lives, or a certain Number of Years, of the Lands, Tenements, and Hereditaments, in Ireland, comprized in his Marriage Settlement.
Henry St John Bolingbroke Restitution Act 1724	11 Geo. 1. c. 40 Pr.	31 May 1725
An Act for enabling Henry St. John late Viscount Bolingbroke, and the Heirs Male of his Body, notwithstanding his Attainder, to take and enjoy several Manors, Lands, and Hereditaments, in the Counties of Wilts, Surrey, and Middlesex, according to such Estates and Interests as to him or them are limited thereof by the Quinquepartite Indenture and other Assurances therein mentioned; and for limiting the same, in Default of Issue Male of the Body of the said late Viscount Bolingbroke, to the other Sons of Henry Viscount St. John successively in Tail Male; and for other Purposes therein expressed.
Annesley's Divorce Act 1724	11 Geo. 1. c. 41 Pr.	31 May 1725
An Act to dissolve the Marriage of Francis Annesley the Younger Esquire with Elizabeth Sutton; and to enable him to marry again; and for other Purposes therein mentioned.
Holford's Estate Act 1724	11 Geo. 1. c. 42 Pr.	31 May 1725
An Act to vest the Real Estate of Dame Elizabeth Holford Widow, deceased, in the Parish of St. Olave's Hart-Street, London, in Christopher Appleby Gentleman and his Heirs, for the better enabling him to sell the same, towards the Discharge of the charitable and other Legacies given by her Will.
Naturalization of Roger Harenc and Matthew de Neufville Act 1724	11 Geo. 1. c. 43 Pr.	31 May 1725
An Act for naturalizing Roger Harenc and Mathew de Neufville.

=== Sources ===
- Pickering, Danby, ed. (1765). "Anno undecimo Georgii I". The Statutes at Large. Vol. 15: From the Ninth Year of King George I to the Second Year of King George II. Cambridge: Joseph Bentham. pp. 175–288 – via Internet Archive.
- Pickering, Danby, ed. (1765). "Anno undecimo Georgii I". The Statutes at Large. Vol. 15: From the Ninth Year of King George I to the Second Year of King George II. Cambridge: Joseph Bentham. pp. 175–288 – via Google Books.
- Pickering, Danby, ed. (1765). "Anno undecimo Georgii I". The Statutes at Large. Vol. 15: From the Ninth Year of King George I to the Second Year of King George II. Cambridge: Joseph Bentham. pp. 175–288 – via Internet Archive.
- Journals of the House of Commons. Vol. 20. London: His Majesty's Stationery Office. 1803. pp. 331–543 – via Google Books.
- Chronological Table of and Index to the Statutes. Vol. 1: To the End of the Session 59 Vict. Sess. 2 (1895) (13th ed.). London: Her Majesty's Stationery Office. 1896. pp. 97–98 – via Google Books.

== See also ==
- List of acts of the Parliament of Great Britain
