= Distillation of Spirits (Ireland) Act 1814 =

Act of the Parliament of the United Kingdom

- Act of Parliament
- Parliament of the United Kingdom
- Long title: An Act to consolidate and amend the Regulations contained In several Acts of Parliament, for imposing and levying of Fines upon Parishes, Townlands and other Places, in respect of the unlawful Distillation of Spirits in Ireland.
- Citation: 54 Geo. 3. c. 150
- Territorial extent: United Kingdom

Dates
- Royal assent: 28 July 1814
- Commencement: 29 September 1814 (Note: Section 38.)
- Repealed: 1 December 1831
Other legislation
Amends	See § Repealed enactments
Repeals/revokes	See § Repealed enactments
Repealed by	Illicit Distillation (Ireland) Act 1831

Status: Repealed

Text of statute as originally enacted

The Distillation of Spirits (Ireland) Act 1814 (54 Geo. 3. c. 150) was an act of the Parliament of the United Kingdom that consolidated enactments related to illicit distillation of spirits in Ireland.

== Provisions ==
=== Repealed enactments ===
Section 1 of the act repealed 5 enactments, listed in that section.

Citation	Short title	Description	Extent of repeal
47 Geo. 3. Sess. 2. c. 17	Auction Duties (Ireland) Act 1807	An Act made in the Forty seventh Year of His present Majesty's Reign, intituled An Act to amend an Act made in the Forty sixth Year of His present Majesty, for the regulating and securing the Collection of the Duties on Spirits distilled in Ireland.	The whole act.
48 Geo. 3. c. 81	Duties on Spirits (Ireland) Act 1808	An Act made in the Forty eighth Year of His present Majesty's Reign, intituled An Act to amend the several Acts for the regulating and securing the Collection of the Duty on Spirits distilled in Ireland.	The whole act.
49 Geo. 3. c. 99	Spirits (Ireland) Act 1809	An Act made in the Forty ninth Year of His present Majesty's Reign, intituled An Act to amend the several Acts for the regulating and securing the Collection of the Duties on Spirits distilled in Ireland; and for regulating the Sale of such Liquors by Retail.	The whole act.
53 Geo. 3. c. 148	Distillation of Spirits (Ireland) (No. 2) Act 1813	An Act made in the last Session of Parliament, intituled An Act to provide for the more effectually preventing the illicit Distillation of Spirits in Ireland.	The whole act.
53 Geo. 3. c. 32	Illicit Distillation (Ireland) Act 1813	An Act made in the present Session of Parliament, intituled An Act to amend the several Acts for preventing the illicit Distillation of Spirits in Ireland.	The whole act.

== Subsequent developments ==
The whole act was repealed by section 54 of the Illicit Distillation (Ireland) Act 1831 (1 & 2 Will. 4. c. 55), which came into force on 1 December 1831.
