= List of acts of the Parliament of the United Kingdom from 1831 =

This is a complete list of acts of the Parliament of the United Kingdom for the year 1831.

Note that the first parliament of the United Kingdom was held in 1801; parliaments between 1707 and 1800 were either parliaments of Great Britain or of Ireland). For acts passed up until 1707, see the list of acts of the Parliament of England and the list of acts of the Parliament of Scotland. For acts passed from 1707 to 1800, see the list of acts of the Parliament of Great Britain. See also the list of acts of the Parliament of Ireland.

For acts of the devolved parliaments and assemblies in the United Kingdom, see the list of acts of the Scottish Parliament, the list of acts of the Northern Ireland Assembly, and the list of acts and measures of Senedd Cymru; see also the list of acts of the Parliament of Northern Ireland.

The number shown after each act's title is its chapter number. Acts passed before 1963 are cited using this number, preceded by the year(s) of the reign during which the relevant parliamentary session was held; thus the Union with Ireland Act 1800 is cited as "39 & 40 Geo. 3 c. 67", meaning the 67th act passed during the session that started in the 39th year of the reign of George III and which finished in the 40th year of that reign. Note that the modern convention is to use Arabic numerals in citations (thus "41 Geo. 3" rather than "41 Geo. III"). Acts of the last session of the Parliament of Great Britain and the first session of the Parliament of the United Kingdom are both cited as "41 Geo. 3". Acts passed from 1963 onwards are simply cited by calendar year and chapter number.

All modern acts have a short title, e.g. the Local Government Act 2003. Some earlier acts also have a short title given to them by later acts, such as by the Short Titles Act 1896.

== 1 Will. 4 ==
Continuing the 9th Parliament of the United Kingdom, which met from 26 October 1830 until 22 April 1831.

This session was also traditionally cited as 1 Gul. 4, 1 Wm. 4 or 1 W. 4.

=== Public general acts ===
Short title	Citation	Royal assent
Long title
Execution of Judgments Act 1831 (repealed)	1 Will. 4. c. 7	11 March 1831
An Act for the more speedy Judgment and Execution in Actions brought in His Majesty's Courts of Law at Westminster, and in the Court of Common Pleas of the County Palatine of Lancaster; and for amending the Law as to Judgment on a Cognovit actionem in Cases of Bankruptcy. (Repealed by Statute Law Revision Act 1891 (54 & 55 Vict. c. 67))
Postmaster-General Act 1831 (repealed)	1 Will. 4. c. 8	11 March 1831
An Act for enabling His Majesty to appoint a Postmaster General for the United Kingdom of Great Britain and Ireland. (Repealed by Post Office (Repeal of Laws) Act 1837 (7 Will. 4 & 1 Vict. c. 32))
Supply Act 1831 (repealed)	1 Will. 4. c. 9	11 March 1831
An Act to apply the Sum of Five Millions, out of the Consolidated Fund, to the Service of the Year One thousand eight hundred and thirty-one. (Repealed by Statute Law Revision Act 1874 (37 & 38 Vict. c. 35))
Appropriation Act 1831 (repealed)	1 Will. 4. c. 10	11 March 1831
An Act for appropriating certain Sums to the Service of the Year One thousand eight hundred and thirty-one. (Repealed by Statute Law Revision Act 1874 (37 & 38 Vict. c. 35))
Exchequer Bills Act 1831 (repealed)	1 Will. 4. c. 11	11 March 1831
An Act for raising the Sum of Twelve Millions by Exchequer Bills, for the Service of the Year One thousand eight hundred and thirty-one. (Repealed by Statute Law Revision Act 1874 (37 & 38 Vict. c. 35))
Duties on Personal Estates, etc. Act 1831 (repealed)	1 Will. 4. c. 12	11 March 1831
An Act for continuing to His Majesty for One Year certain Duties on Personal Estates, Offices, and Pensions in England, for the Service of the Year One thousand eight hundred and thirty-one. (Repealed by Statute Law Revision Act 1874 (37 & 38 Vict. c. 35))
Richmond Lunatic Asylum Act 1831 (repealed)	1 Will. 4. c. 13	11 March 1831
An Act to amend an Act passed in the Eleventh Year of the Reign of His late Majesty King George the Fourth, intituled "An Act for appropriating the Richmond Lunatic Asylum in Dublin to the Purposes of a District Lunatic Asylum." (Note: Richmond Lunatic Asylum Act 1830 (11 Geo. 4 & 1 Will. 4. c. 22)) (Repealed by Statute Law (Repeals) Act 1993 (c. 50))
Marine Mutiny Act 1831 (repealed)	1 Will. 4. c. 14	15 March 1831
An Act for the Regulation of His Majesty's Royal Marine Forces while on Shore. (Repealed by Statute Law Revision Act 1874 (37 & 38 Vict. c. 35))
Mutiny Act 1831 (repealed)	1 Will. 4. c. 15	15 March 1831
An Act for punishing Mutiny and Desertion; and for the better Payment of the Army and their Quarters. (Repealed by Statute Law Revision Act 1874 (37 & 38 Vict. c. 35))
Payment of Creditors (Scotland) Act 1831 (repealed)	1 Will. 4. c. 16	15 March 1831
An Act to continue until the Fifth Day of July One thousand eight hundred and thirty-two an Act of the Fifty-fourth Year of His Majesty King George the Third, (Note: Payment of Creditors (Scotland) Act 1814 (54 Geo. 3. c. 137)) for rendering the Payment of Creditors more equal and expeditious in Scotland. (Repealed by Statute Law Revision Act 1874 (37 & 38 Vict. c. 35))
Duties on Calicoes, etc., Repeal Act 1831 (repealed)	1 Will. 4. c. 17	15 March 1831
An Act to repeal the Duties and Drawbacks on Printed Calicoes, Linens, and Stuffs. (Repealed by Statute Law Revision Act 1874 (37 & 38 Vict. c. 35))
Poor Relief (Settlement) Act 1831 (repealed)	1 Will. 4. c. 18	30 March 1831
An Act to explain and amend an Act of the Sixth Year of His late Majesty King George the Fourth, (Note: Poor Relief (Settlement) Act 1825 (6 Geo. 4. c. 57)) as far as regards the Settlement of the Poor by the renting and Occupation of Tenements. (Repealed by Poor Law Act 1927 (17 & 18 Geo. 5. c. 14))
Census (Ireland) Act 1831 (repealed)	1 Will. 4. c. 19	30 March 1831
An Act to extend the Provisions of an Act of the Fifty-fifth Year of the Reign of King George the Third, (Note: Census (Ireland) Act 1815 (55 Geo. 3. c. 120)) to provide for the taking an Account of the Population of Ireland, and for ascertaining the Increase or Diminution thereof. (Repealed by Census (Ireland) Act 1840 (3 & 4 Vict. c. 100))
Land Tenure, Lower Canada Act 1831 (repealed)	1 Will. 4. c. 20	30 March 1831
An Act to explain and amend the Laws relating to Lands holden in Free and Common Soccage in the Province of Lower Canada. (Repealed by Statute Law Revision (No. 2) Act 1888 (51 & 52 Vict. c. 57))
Prohibition and Mandamus Act 1831 (repealed)	1 Will. 4. c. 21	30 March 1831
An Act to improve the Proceedings in Prohibition and on Writs of Mandamus. (Repealed for England and Wales by Statute Law Revision and Civil Procedure Act 1883 (46 & 47 Vict. c. 49) and for Scotland and Ireland by Statute Law Revision Act 1891 (54 & 55 Vict. c. 67))
Evidence on Commission Act 1831 (repealed)	1 Will. 4. c. 22	30 March 1831
An Act to enable Courts of Law to order the Examination of Witnesses upon Interrogatories and otherwise. (Repealed by Statute Law Revision Act 1963 (c. 30))
Sugar Duties Act 1831 (repealed)	1 Will. 4. c. 23	30 March 1831
An Act for granting to His Majesty, until the Fifth Day of April One thousand eight hundred and thirty-two, certain Duties on Sugar imported into the United Kingdom, for the Service of the Year One thousand eight hundred and thirty. (Repealed by Statute Law Revision Act 1874 (37 & 38 Vict. c. 35))
Trade with British Possession Act 1831 (repealed)	1 Will. 4. c. 24	22 April 1831
An Act to amend an Act of the Sixth Year of His late Majesty, (Note: Customs, etc. (No. 9) Act 1825 (6 Geo. 4. c. 114)) to regulate the Trade of the British Possessions Abroad. (Repealed by Customs (Repeal) Act 1833 (3 & 4 Will. 4. c. 50))
Civil List Act 1831 (repealed)	1 Will. 4. c. 25	22 April 1831
An Act for the Support of His Majesty's Household, and of the Honour and Dignity of the Crown of the United Kingdom of Great Britain and Ireland. (Repealed by Statute Law Revision Act 1874 (37 & 38 Vict. c. 35))
Indemnity Act 1831 (repealed)	1 Will. 4. c. 26	22 April 1831
An Act to indemnify such Persons in the United Kingdom as have omitted to qualify themselves for Offices and Employments, and for extending the Time limited for those Purposes respectively until the Twenty-fifth Day of March One thousand eight hundred and thirty-two; to permit such Persons in Great Britain as have omitted to make and file Affidavits of the Execution of Indentures of Clerks to Attornies and Solicitors to make and file the same on or before the First Day of Hilary Term One thousand eight hundred and thirty-two; and to allow Persons to make and file such Affidavits, although the Persons whom they served shall have neglected to take out their annual Certificates. (Repealed by Promissory Oaths Act 1871 (34 & 35 Vict. c. 48))
Sale of Post Office Buildings Act 1831 (repealed)	1 Will. 4. c. 27	22 April 1831
An Act for enabling His Majesty's Postmaster General to sell the Premises lately used as the Post Office in Lombard Street, Abchurch Lane, and Sherborne Lane, in the City of London. (Repealed by Post Office Act 1969 (c. 48))

=== Local acts ===
Short title	Citation	Royal assent
Long title
London Bridge Approaches Act 1831	1 Will. 4. c. iii	11 March 1831
An Act for enlarging the Powers of an Act passed in the Tenth Year of the Reign of His late Majesty, (Note: London Bridge Approaches Act 1829 (10 Geo. 4. c. cxxxvi)) for improving the Approaches to London Bridge.
Bristol Poor Relief Act 1831 (repealed)	1 Will. 4. c. iv	11 March 1831
An Act to alter, amend, and enlarge the Powers of an Act passed in the Third Year of the Reign of His late Majesty King George the Fourth, (Note: Bristol Improvement Act 1822 (3 Geo. 4. c. xxiv)) for regulating the Poor of the City of Bristol, and for other Purposes connected therewith. (Repealed by Statute Law (Repeals) Act 2013 (c. 2))
Hounslow Heath and Egham Hill Road Act 1831 (repealed)	1 Will. 4. c. v	11 March 1831
An Act for more effectually repairing the Road from the Powder Mills on Hounslow Heath in the County of Middlesex, to the Twenty Mite Stone on Egham Hill in the County of Surrey. (Repealed by Statute Law (Repeals) Act 2013 (c. 2))
Faversham, Hythe and Canterbury Road Act 1831	1 Will. 4. c. vi	11 March 1831
An Act for more effectually repairing and otherwise improving the Road from the Post Road near Faversham, by Bacon's Water, through Ashford, to Hythe, and from Bacon's Water to Castle Street in the City of Canterbury, all in the County of Kent.
Road from Crossford Bridge to Manchester Act 1831	1 Will. 4. c. vii	11 March 1831
An Act for more effectually maintaining the Road from Crossford Bridge to the Town of Manchester in the County Palatine of Lancaster, and for making a Branch Road to communicate therewith.
Dartford and Sevenoaks Road Act 1831	1 Will. 4. c. viii	11 March 1831
An Act for repairing the Road leading from Dartford to Sevenoaks in the County of Kent.
Wimborne Minster and Blandford Forum Road Act 1831 (repealed)	1 Will. 4. c. ix	11 March 1831
An Act for repairing the Road from Wimborne Minster to Blandford Forum in the County of Dorset. (Repealed by Wimborne Minster and Blandford Forum Turnpike Road Act 1860 (23 & 24 Vict. c. cxlvi))
Burton Bridge and Market Bosworth Road Act 1831	1 Will. 4. c. x	11 March 1831
An Act for repairing the Road from Burton Bridge in the County of Stafford to Market Bostworth in the County of Leicester.
Birmingham and Bromsgrove Road Act 1831	1 Will. 4. c. xi	11 March 1831
An Act for repairing the Road from Birmingham to Bromsgrove.
Measham and Fieldon Bridge Road (Derbyshire, Warwickshire) Act 1831	1 Will. 4. c. xii	11 March 1831
An Act for repairing the Road from Measham in the County of Derby to Fieldon Bridge in the County of Warwick, and Other Roads communicating therewith, in the Counties of Derby, Leicester, and Warwick.
Road from Clown to Worksop Act 1831	1 Will. 4. c. xiii	11 March 1831
An Act for more effectually repairing the Road from the Rotherham and Mansfield Turnpike Road, at or near Clown in the County of Derby, to the Worksop and Kelham Turnpike Road at or near Budby in the County of Nottingham.
Watling Street, and Mancester (Warwickshire) and Wolvey Heath Road Act 1831 (repealed)	1 Will. 4. c. xiv	11 March 1831
An Act for repairing the Watling Street Road, the Mancester and Wolvey Heath Road, and other Roads communicating therewith, in the Counties of Leicester and Warwick. (Repealed by Statute Law (Repeals) Act 2013 (c. 2))
Road from Macclesfield to Nether Tabley Act 1831	1 Will. 4. c. xv	11 March 1831
An Act for repairing the Road from the Broken Cross in Macclesfield to Nather Tabley in the County of Chester.
Manchester Gas Act 1831 (repealed)	1 Will. 4. c. xvi	15 March 1831
An Act to authorize the raising of further Monies for supplying the Town of Manchester with Gas. (Repealed by Manchester General Improvement Act 1851 (14 & 15 Vict. c. cxix))
Road from the Winchester and Southampton Road Act 1831 (repealed)	1 Will. 4. c. xvii	15 March 1831
An Act for more effectually repairing and improving the Road from Lower Saint Cross Mill Lane, on the Road from the City of Winchester to Southampton, to Park Gate, on the Road from Southampton to Gosport, in the County of Southampton. (Repealed by Winchester Road Act 1862 (25 & 26 Vict. c. xii))
Road from Cheltenham to Bishop's Cleeve Act 1831 (repealed)	1 Will. 4. c. xviii	15 March 1831
An Act for more effectually repairing the Road from Albion Street, in the Town of Cheltenham in the County of Gloucester, to Bunch Lane in or near the Village of Bishop's Cleeve in the said County, to join the Turnpike Road leading from the Town of Evesham in the County of Worcester to the said Town of Cheltenham. (Repealed by Cleeve and Evesham Road Act 1863 (26 & 27 Vict. c. xxviii))
School for the Indigent Blind Act 1831 (repealed)	1 Will. 4. c. xix	30 March 1831
An Act to enlarge the Powers of an Act passed in the Seventh Year of the Reign of His late Majesty King George the Fourth, (Note: School for the Indigent Blind Act 1826 (7 Geo. 4. c. lxviii)) for establishing and well-governing the Institution called "The School for the Indigent Blind," and for incorporating the Subscribers thereto, and the better enabling them to carry on their charitable and useful Designs. (Repealed by Charities (The Royal School for the Blind) Order 1996 (SI 1996/1667))
St. Martin's (Birmingham) Churchyard Act 1831	1 Will. 4. c. xx	30 March 1831
An Act to amend an Act of the Forty-seventh Year of King George the Third, (Note: St. Martin's (Birmingham) Churchyard and Burial Ground Act 1807 (47 Geo. 3 Sess. 1. c. xv)) for enlarging the Churchyard belonging to the Parish of Saini Martin in the Town of Birmingham in the County of Warwick, and for providing an additions Cemetery or Burial Ground for the Use of the said Parish.
Liverpool Rates Act 1831 (repealed)	1 Will. 4. c. xxi	30 March 1831
An Act for the better assessing and recovering of the Rates for the Relief of the Poor, and of the Ecclesiastical or Church Rates upon small Tenements, within the Parish of Liverpool in die County Palatine of Lancaster. (Repealed by Liverpool Rates Act 1834 (4 & 5 Will. 4. c. vi))
St. Mary Magdalen Bermondsey (Additional Church) Act 1831 (repealed)	1 Will. 4. c. xxii	30 March 1831
An Act for raising a further Sum of Money to defray the outstanding Claims in respect of the building the Crypt and Tower to the additional Church erected in the Parish of Saint Mary Magdalen Bermondsey in the County of Surrey, and of inclosing the Burial Ground thereof. (Repealed by Bermondsey Vestry Act 1885 (48 & 49 Vict. c. cxvi))
St. John's Church, Liscard (Cheshire) Act 1831	1 Will. 4. c. xxiii	30 March 1831
An Act for building a Church or Chapel, with a Cemetery to the same, in the Township of Liscard in the Parish of Wallasey, in the County Palatine of Chester.
St. Leonard's Chapel, Hastings Act 1831	1 Will. 4. c. xxiv	30 March 1831
An Act for erecting a Chapel in the Parish of Saint Leonard's within the Liberty of the Town and Port of Hastings in the County of Sussex, for the Accommodation of the Inhabitants of the said Parish and of the Parish of Saint Mary Magdalen within the said Liberty and County.
Herne Bay Pier Act 1831	1 Will. 4. c. xxv	30 March 1831
An Act for making and maintaining a Pier or Jetty, and other Works, at Herne Bay in the Parish of Herne in the County of Kent.
Great West Fen Drainage Act 1831 (repealed)	1 Will. 4. c. xxvi	30 March 1831
An Act for more effectually draining certain Fen Lands and Wet Grounds called the Great West Fen, in the Parish of Hilgay in the County of Norfolk. (Repealed by Hilgay Great West Fen Drainage Act 1854 (17 & 18 Vict. c. clxxii))
North Level Commission Act 1831	1 Will. 4. c. xxvii	30 March 1831
An Act to amend an Act passed in the Eleventh Year of the Reign of His late Majesty King George the Fourth, intituled "An Act for improving the Drainage of the Lands lying in the North Level, Part of the west Level of the Fens called Bedford Level, and in Great Portsand in the Manor of Crowland, and for providing a Navigation between Clows Cross and the Nene Outfall Cut." (Note: North Level Commission Act 1830 (11 Geo. 4 & 1 Will. 4. c. liii))
Milford and Haslemere Road Act 1831 (repealed)	1 Will. 4. c. xxviii	30 March 1831
An Act for more effectually amending and widening the Road from a Place near the Village of Milord in the County of Surrey, through Haslemere, to the Forty-third Mile Stone at Carpenter's Heath, and from thence to a Bridge, near the Blue Bell Inn, over Houndley's Water, at the Boundary of the said County of Surrey. (Repealed by Statute Law (Repeals) Act 2013 (c. 2))
Road from Leeds to Wortley Act 1831 (repealed)	1 Will. 4. c. xxix	30 March 1831
An Act for amending and maintaining the Turnpike Road from and out of the Road leading from Quebec in Leeds to Homefield Lane End in Wortley, to communicate with the Road leading from Huddersfield to Birstal at the Coach and Horses Public House in Birstal in the West Riding of the County of York. (Repealed by Leeds and Birstal Road Act 1862 (25 & 26 Vict. c. cxvii))
Stafford, Sandon and Eccleshall Turnpike Roads Act 1831 (repealed)	1 Will. 4. c. xxx	30 March 1831
An Act for amending and maintaining the Roads from Stafford to Sandon in the County of Stafford, and from Stafford through Bridgford and Eccleshall to Ireland's Cross near Woore in the County of Salop, and from Bridgford aforesaid to the Stone which divides the Liberty of Ranton and Ellenhall in the Road between Bridgford and Newport, and from the Village of Knighton to the Turnpike Road leading from Stone to Woore aforesaid. (Repealed by Stafford District Turnpike Roads Act 1866 (29 & 30 Vict. c. l))
Stone and Stafford, and Stafford and Streetway Roads Act 1831 (repealed)	1 Will. 4. c. xxxi	30 March 1831
An Act for amending and improving the Road from the Town of Stone to Gaol Gate in the Borough of Stafford, and from Green Gate in the said Borough, through Dunston and Penkridge, to Streetway Road in the Road leading to Wolverhampton, in the County of Stafford. (Repealed by Stafford District Turnpike Roads Act 1866 (29 & 30 Vict. c. l))
Norwich and North Walsham Road Act 1831 (repealed)	1 Will. 4. c. xxxii	30 March 1831
An Act for more effectually repairing and improving the Road from the City of Norwich to North Walsham in the County of Norfolk. (Repealed by Statute Law (Repeals) Act 2008 (c. 12))
Stopham Bridge and Steyning Turnpike Road (Sussex) Act 1831	1 Will. 4. c. xxxiii	30 March 1831
An Act for more effectually repairing the Road from Stopham Bridge in the Parish of Pulborough to the Direction Post in the Parish of Steyning on the Turnpike Road leading from Steyning to Horsham in the County of Sussex.
Road from Liverpool to Preston Act 1831	1 Will. 4. c. xxxiv	30 March 1831
An Act for more effectually repairing and improving the Road from Liverpool to Preston in the County Palatine of Lancaster.
Wakefield and Aberford Road Act 1831 (repealed)	1 Will. 4. c. xxxv	30 March 1831
An Act for repairing and maintaining the Road from Wakefield to Aberford in the County of York. (Repealed by Wakefield and Aberford Turnpike Road Act 1863 (26 & 27 Vict. c. cxxxv))
Bishop's Hatfield and Hitchin, and Welwyn and Hitchin Roads Act 1831	1 Will. 4. c. xxxvi	30 March 1831
An Act for more effectually repairing and improving the Roads from Lemsford Mills in the Parish of Bishop's Hatfield, through Welwyn and Stevenage, to Hitchin, and from Welwyn through Codicot, to Hitchin aforesaid, all in the County of Hertford.
Roads from Bury to Blackburn and Branches Act 1831 (repealed)	1 Will. 4. c. xxxvii	30 March 1831
An Act for repairing, improving, and maintaining the Roads from Bury through Haslingden to Blackburn and Whalley, and other Roads communicating therewith, in the County Palatine of Lancaster, and for making a new Piece of Road also to communicate therewith. (Repealed by Road from Bury to Blackburn and Branches Act 1839 (2 & 3 Vict. c. xxxi))
Roads in Parishes of Desford and Newbold (Leicestershire) Act 1831 (repealed)	1 Will. 4. c. xxxviii	30 March 1831
An Act for more effectually repairing and improving the Road from the Leicester and Welford Road, near Foston Lane, to the Road leading from Hinckley to Ashby-de-la-Zouch; and for repairing Hunt's Lane and Wood Lane, in the Parishes of Desford and Newbold in the County of Leicester. (Repealed by Desford Road Act 1863 (26 & 27 Vict. c. xxxix))
Burton-upon-Trent and Abbott's Bromley Road Act 1831	1 Will. 4. c. xxxix	30 March 1831
An Act for more effectually repairing the Road from Burton-upon-Trent in the County of Stafford to Abbott's Bromley, otherwise Bagot's Bromley, in the said County.
Coventry and Stoney Stanton Turnpike Road Act 1831	1 Will. 4. c. xl	30 March 1831
An Act for making and maintaining a Turnpike Road from the City of Coventry to Stoney Stanton in the County of Leicester, to unite with the present Turnpike Road there leading through Narborough to the Borough of Leicester.
Coventry and Over Whitacre Road Act 1831	1 Will. 4. c. xli	30 March 1831
An Act for repairing the Road from the City of Coventry to Over Whitacre in the County of Warwick.
Horley Common, Black Corner and Cuckfield Road Act 1831 (repealed)	1 Will. 4. c. xlii	30 March 1831
An Act for more effectually repairing and maintaining the Road over Horley Common in the County of Surrey to a Place called Black Corner, and from thence to the Brighthelmstone Turnpike Road at Cuckfield in the County of Sussex. (Repealed by Statute Law (Repeals) Act 2013 (c. 2))
Almond Bridge and Baillieston Road Act 1831	1 Will. 4. c. xliii	30 March 1831
An Act for more effectually making and repairing the Road from the new Bridge over the Water of Almond, on the Confines of the Counties of Edinburgh and Linlithgow, to Baillieston in the County of Lanark, and certain Branch Roads connected therewith.
Doncaster, Wakefield, Pontefract, Weeland and Wentbridge Roads Act 1831 (repealed)	1 Will. 4. c. xliv	30 March 1831
An Act for improving the Road from the Red House near Doncaster to the South Side of Wakefield Bridge, and from Wakefield to Pontefract, and from thence to Weeland, and from Pontefract to Wentbridge, all in the West Riding of the County of York. (Repealed by Red House and Weeland Roads Act 1862 (25 & 26 Vict. c. cv))
Junction Road between Bromley and Farnborough Road and Tunbridge Wells and Maresfield Road Act 1831	1 Will. 4. c. xlv	30 March 1831
An Act for repairing and maintaining the Road leading from the High Road between Bromley and Farnborough in the County of Kent to Beggars Bush in the Turnpike Road leading from Tonbridge Wells to Maresfield in the County of Sussex.
Walsall Roads Act 1831	1 Will. 4. c. xlvi	30 March 1831
An Act for improving and maintaining several Roads leading to and from the Town of Walsall in the County of Stafford.
Perry Barr and Aston juxta Birmingham Turnpike Road Act 1831	1 Will. 4. c. xlvii	30 March 1831
An Act for making a Turnpike Road from the North Side of the Quarry House in the Township of Perry Barr in the County of Stafford to the Brook which divides the Parishes of Aston juxta Birmingham and Birmingham in the County of Warwick.
Middlesex County Rates Act 1831 (repealed)	1 Will. 4. c. xlviii	22 April 1831
An Act to alter and amend the several Acts now in force for the assessing, collecting, and levying of County Rates, so far as the same relate to the County of Middlesex. (Repealed by County Rates Act 1852 (15 & 16 Vict. c. 81))
Glossop Water Act 1831 (repealed)	1 Will. 4. c. xlix	22 April 1831
An Act for better supplying with Water the several Hamlets of Beard, Ollerset, Thornset, and Whittle, in the Parish of Glossop in the County of Derby. (Repealed by New Mills Urban District Council Act 1906 (6 Edw. 7. c. xxxv))
River Waveney Navigation Act 1831	1 Will. 4. c. l	22 April 1831
An Act for making the River Waveney navigable for Ships and other Seaborne Vessels from Rosehall Fleet to the Mouth of Oulton Dyke; and for making and maintaining a navigable Cut from the said River at Carlton Shares Mill into the said Dyke leading to Oulton Broad in the County of Suffolk.
Liverpool and Manchester Railway Act 1831 (repealed)	1 Will. 4. c. li	22 April 1831
An Act for amending and enlarging the Powers and Provisions of the several Acts relating to the Liverpool and Manchester Railway. (Repealed by Grand Junction Railway Act 1845 (8 & 9 Vict. c. cxcviii))
Hyde, Werneth and Newton Water Act 1831	1 Will. 4. c. lii	22 April 1831
An Act for better supplying with Water the several Townships of Hyde, Werneth, and Newton, in the County Palatine of Chester.
Undrained Fen, Yaxley (Huntingdonshire) Act 1831	1 Will. 4. c. liii	22 April 1831
An Act for embanking, draining, improving, and preserving certain Fen Lands and Low Grounds lying in the Parish of Yaxley in the County of Huntingdon, called "The Undrained Fen."
Birmingham and Liverpool Junction Canal Act 1831 (repealed)	1 Will. 4. c. liv	22 April 1831
An Act to enlarge and amend the Powers and Provisions of the several Acts relating to the Birmingham and Liverpool Junction Canal, and to better supply the said Canal with Water. (Repealed by Ellesmere and Chester Canal Company Act 1845 (8 & 9 Vict. c. ii))
Trent and Mersey Canal Act 1831	1 Will. 4. c. lv	22 April 1831
An Act to consolidate and extend the Powers and Provisions of the several Acts relating to the Navigation from the Trent to the Mersey.
Preston and Wigan Railway Act 1831 (repealed)	1 Will. 4. c. lvi	22 April 1831
An Act for making and maintaining a Railway from the Borough of Wigan to the Borough of Preston, both in the County Palatine of Lancaster, and collateral Branches to communicate therewith. (Repealed by North Union Railway Act 1834 (4 & 5 Will. 4. c. xxv))
Great Marlow Church Act 1831	1 Will. 4. c. lvii	22 April 1831
An Act for taking down the Parish Church of Great Marlow in the County of Buckingham, and for rebuilding the same on or near the present Site thereof.
Llandovery District of the Lampeter Roads Act 1831 (repealed)	1 Will. 4. c. lviii	22 April 1831
An Act for more effectually keeping in repair several Roads in the County of Carmarthen, usually called the Llandovery District of the Lampeter Roads, and for making and maintaining certain new Lines of Road to communicate therewith. (Repealed by Turnpike Trusts in South Wales Act 1844 (7 & 8 Vict. c. 91))
Ludlow-fach, Llandovery and River Amman Roads (Carmarthen and Glamorgan) Act 1831 (repealed)	1 Will. 4. c. lix	22 April 1831
An Act for more effectually keeping in repair the Roads from Ludlowfach to the Town of Llandovery, and from thence to the River Amman in the County of Carmarthen, and several other Roads in the said County communicating therewith, and for making new Branches of Road in the same County and in the County of Glamorgan. (Repealed by Turnpike Trusts in South Wales Act 1844 (7 & 8 Vict. c. 91))
Enfield Chase Road Act 1831	1 Will. 4. c. lx	22 April 1831
An Act for maintaining the Road from Enfield Chase in the County of Middlesex to Lemsford Mill in the County of Hertford.
Titchfield and Cosham Road Act 1831	1 Will. 4. c. lxi	22 April 1831
An Act for maintaining and improving the Road from Titchfield to Cosham in the County of Southampton.
Pucklechurch or Lower District of Roads Act 1831 (repealed)	1 Will. 4. c. lxii	22 April 1831
An Act for more effectually repairing and improving the Roads called "The Pucklechurch or Lower District of Roads" in the Counties of Gloucester and Wilts. (Repealed by Pucklechurch Roads Act 1864 (27 & 28 Vict. c. l))
Draycot or Upper District Turnpike Road (Wiltshire) Act 1831	1 Will. 4. c. lxiii	22 April 1831
An Act for repairing the Turnpike Road from the Salutation Inn to Christian Malford Bridge in the County of Wilts, called The Draycot or Upper District; and for disuniting the said Road from a certain other Road called The Pucklechurch Lower District, in the County of Gloucester.
Carlowrie Bridge and Linlithgow Bridge Road Act 1831	1 Will. 4. c. lxiv	22 April 1831
An Act for more effectually repairing and keeping in repair the Road from Carlowrie Bridge on the River Almond to Linlithgow Bridge on the River Avon, and other Roads in the County of Linlithgow.
Road from Norwich to the Caister Causeway Act 1831 (repealed)	1 Will. 4. c. lxv	22 April 1831
An Act for more effectually repairing the Road from Bishopsgate Bridge in the City of Norwich to the Caister Causeway in the County of Norfolk. (Repealed by Statute Law (Repeals) Act 2008 (c. 12))
Bruton (or Brewton) Roads Act 1831	1 Will. 4. c. lxvi	22 April 1831
An Act for more effectually repairing several Roads in and near the Town of Bruton, and other Roads in the Counties of Somerset and Wilts, and for making and maintaining Two other Roads communicating therewith.
Road from Loughborough to Cavendish Bridge Act 1831 (repealed)	1 Will. 4. c. lxvii	22 April 1831
An Act for more effectually repairing, widening, and otherwise improving the Road from the South-east End of the Town of Loughborough in the County of Leicester, commencing at South Field Lane, to the South End of Cavendish Bridge in the same County. (Repealed by Annual Turnpike Acts Continuance Act 1884 (47 & 48 Vict. c. 52))
Roads in the Neighbourhood of Cheadle Act 1831 (repealed)	1 Will. 4. c. lxviii	22 April 1831
An Act for consolidating the Trusts of the several Turnpike Roads in the Neighbourhood of Cheadle in the County of Stafford, and for making Deviations and new Branches to and from the same. (Repealed by Cheadle Turnpike Roads Act 1862 (25 & 26 Vict. c. cl))
Roads in Glamorgan Act 1831 (repealed)	1 Will. 4. c. lxix	22 April 1831
An Act to amend an Act of the Seventh and Eighth Years of His late Majesty, (Note: Roads in Glamorgan Act 1827 (7 & 8 Geo. 4. c. xcviii)) for the more effectually repairing and otherwise improving the Roads in the County of Glamorgan. (Repealed by Turnpike Trusts in South Wales Act 1844 (7 & 8 Vict. c. 91))
Roads from Tunbridge Wells and from Florence Farm Act 1831	1 Will. 4. c. lxx	22 April 1831
An Act for more effectually repairing and improving, the Roads from Tunbridge Wells in the County of Kent to the Cross Ways at or near Maresfield Street, and from Florence Farm to Forest Row in the County of Sussex.

=== Private acts ===
Short title	Citation	Royal assent
Long title
Compton Bassett Inclosure Act 1831	1 Will. 4. c. 2 Pr.	11 March 1831
An Act for inclosing Lands in the Parish of Compton Bassett in the County of Wilts.
Canterbury Cathedral Act 1831	1 Will. 4. c. 3 Pr.	30 March 1831
An Act for assisting the Dean and Chapter of the Cathedral and Metropolitical Church of Christ, Canterbury, to take down and rebuild the North-western Tower of the same Church.
See of Worcester's Estate Act 1831	1 Will. 4. c. 4 Pr.	30 March 1831
An Act to enable the Right Reverend the Lord Bishop of Worcester, and his Successors, to grant Leases of certain Hereditaments belonging to the Episcopal See of Worcester, situate, arising, or growing within the Parish of Ripple in the County of Worcester.
Cambridge University Act 1831	1 Will. 4. c. 5 Pr.	30 March 1831
An Act to effect an Exchange between the Chancellor, Masters, and Scholars of the University of Cambridge, and the Master, Fellows, and Scholars of the College or Hall of the Holy Trinity commonly called Trinity Hall, in the same University, of Lands situate in the Parish of Saint Andrew the Less in the Town of Cambridge in the County of Cambridge; and for authorising the Removal of the present Botanic Garden of the said University to a new and more eligible Site; and for other Purposes.
Alvingham Inclosure Act 1831	1 Will. 4. c. 6 Pr.	30 March 1831
An Act for rendering valid the Supplementary Award of the Commissioners under an Act of the Fifty-ninth Year of King George the Third, intituled "An Act for inclosing Lands in the Parish of Alvingham in the County of Lincoln." (Note: Alvingham Inclosure Act 1819 (59 Geo. 3. c. 49 Pr.))
Milverton Inclosure Act 1831	1 Will. 4. c. 7 Pr.	22 April 1831
An Act for inclosing Lands in the Parish of Milverton in the County of Somerset.
Robert Grosvenor MP Indemnity Act 1831 (Note: This act was not printed by the King's Printer.)	1 Will. 4. c. 8 Pr.	11 March 1831
An Act to relieve the Right Honourable Robert Grosvenor from certain Penalties incurred by sitting and voting in the House of Commons without having conformed to the Laws in such Case made and provided.
Maiden Newton Inclosure Act 1831	1 Will. 4. c. 9 Pr.	11 March 1831
An Act for inclosing Lands within the Parish of Maiden Newton in the County of Dorset.
Peniche's Naturalization Act 1831	1 Will. 4. c. 10 Pr.	11 March 1831
An Act for naturalizing John Thomas Peniche.

=== Sources ===
- The Statutes of the United Kingdom of Great Britain and Ireland, 1 William IV. 1831. London. 1831 – via Internet Archive.
- The Statutes of the United Kingdom of Great Britain and Ireland, 1 William IV. 1831. London. 1831 – via Google Books.
- * Journals of the House of Commons. Vol. 86. London: His Majesty's Stationery Office. pp. 5–518 – via Google Books.

== 1 & 2 Will. 4 ==
The first session of the 10th Parliament of the United Kingdom, which met from 14 June 1831 until 20 October 1831.

This session was also traditionally cited as 1 & 2 Gul. 4, 1 & 2 Wm. 4 or 1 & 2 W. 4.

=== Public general acts ===
Short title	Citation	Royal assent
Long title
Buckingham House Act 1831 (repealed)	1 & 2 Will. 4. c. 1	11 July 1831
An Act for repealing so much of an Act passed in the Seventh Year of His late Majesty King George the Fourth, (Note: St. George Hanover Square and St. Luke Chelsea Improvement Act 1826 (7 Geo. 4. c. lviii)) for paving, lighting, watching, repairing, and otherwise improving Grosvenor Place, and other Streets therein mentioned, as relates to the Assessment of the Boundary Fence or Wall of the Garden belonging to Buckingham House. (Repealed by Statute Law Revision Act 1874 (37 & 38 Vict. c. 35))
Commissions, etc. (Ireland) Act 1831 (repealed)	1 & 2 Will. 4. c. 2	11 July 1831
An Act to revive and continue expired Commissions, Appointments, Patents, and Grants in Ireland; and to indemnify certain Persons in relation thereto. (Repealed by Statute Law Revision Act 1874 (37 & 38 Vict. c. 35))
Deputy Lieutenants Indemnity (Scotland) Act 1831 (repealed)	1 & 2 Will. 4. c. 3	11 July 1831
An Act to indemnify Persons who have acted as Deputy Lieutenants in Scotland without due Qualification. (Repealed by Statute Law Revision Act 1874 (37 & 38 Vict. c. 35))
Excise Declarations Act 1831 (repealed)	1 & 2 Will. 4. c. 4	30 July 1831
An Act to abolish certain Oaths and Affirmations taken and made in the Customs and Excise Departments of His Majesty's Revenue, and to substitute Declarations in lieu thereof. (Repealed by Customs and Excise Act 1952 (15 & 16 Geo. 6 & 1 Eliz. 2. c. 44))
Duchy of Cornwall Lands Act 1831 (repealed)	1 & 2 Will. 4. c. 5	30 July 1831
An Act to enable His Majesty to make Leases, Copies, and Grants of Offices, Lands and Hereditaments, Parcel of the Duchy of Cornwall, or annexed to the same. (Repealed by Statute Law Revision Act 1874 (37 & 38 Vict. c. 35))
Turnpike Acts Continuance Act 1831 (repealed)	1 & 2 Will. 4. c. 6	30 July 1831
An Act for continuing, until the Thirtieth Day of June One thousand eight hundred and thirty-two, the several Acts for regulating the Turnpike Roads in Great Britain which will expire at the End of the present Session of Parliament. (Repealed by Statute Law Revision Act 1874 (37 & 38 Vict. c. 35))
Assessed Taxes Act 1831 (repealed)	1 & 2 Will. 4. c. 7	30 July 1831
An Act to continue Compositions for Assessed Taxes until the Fifth Day of April One thousand eight hundred and thirty-three, and to grant Relief in certain Cases. (Repealed by Revenue Act 1869 (32 & 33 Vict. c. 14))
Militia Ballots Suspension Act 1831 (repealed)	1 & 2 Will. 4. c. 8	30 July 1831
An Act to suspend, until the End of the next Session of Parliament, the making of Lists, and the Ballots and Enrolments, for the Militia of the United Kingdom. (Repealed by Statute Law Revision Act 1874 (37 & 38 Vict. c. 35))
House of Commons, Oaths Act 1831 (repealed)	1 & 2 Will. 4. c. 9	30 July 1831
An Act to repeal so much of certain Acts as requires certain Oaths to be taken by Members of the Home of Commons before the Lord Steward or his Deputies. (Repealed by Promissory Oaths Act 1871 (34 & 35 Vict. c. 48))
Mint Act 1831 (repealed)	1 & 2 Will. 4. c. 10	30 July 1831
An Act to reduce the Salary of the Master and Worker of His Majesty's Mint. (Repealed by Coinage Act 1870 (33 & 34 Vict. c. 10))
Provision for the Queen Act 1831 (repealed)	1 & 2 Will. 4. c. 11	2 August 1831
An Act for enabling His Majesty to make Provision for supporting the Royal Dignity of the Queen in case She shall survive His Majesty. (Repealed by Statute Law Revision Act 1874 (37 & 38 Vict. c. 35))
Forest of Dean commissioners, etc. Act 1831 or the Dean Forest Commission Act 1831 (repealed)	1 & 2 Will. 4. c. 12	2 August 1831
An Act for ascertaining the Boundaries of the Forest of Dean, and for inquiring into the Rights and Privileges claimed by Free Miners of the Hundred of Saint Briavel's, and for other Purposes. (Repealed by Statute Law Revision Act 1874 (37 & 38 Vict. c. 35))
Tobacco Cultivation Act 1831 (repealed)	1 & 2 Will. 4. c. 13	23 August 1831
An Act to repeal an Act of the Nineteenth Year of King George the Third, (Note: Tobacco Act 1779 (19 Geo. 3. c. 35)) for repealing so much of several Acts as prohibit the Growth and Produce of Tobacco in Ireland, and to permit the importation of Tobacco of the Growth and Produce of that Kingdom into Great Britain. (Repealed by Finance Act 1908 (8 Edw. 7. c. 16) and Finance (1909-10) Act 1910 (10 Edw. 7 & 1 Geo. 5. c. 8))
Exchequer Bills (No. 2) Act 1831 (repealed)	1 & 2 Will. 4. c. 14	23 August 1831
An Act for raising the Sum of Thirteen millions six hundred and sixteen thousand four hundred Pounds by Exchequer Bills, for the Service of the Year One thousand eight hundred and thirty-one. (Repealed by Statute Law Revision Act 1874 (37 & 38 Vict. c. 35))
Militia Pay Act 1831 (repealed)	1 & 2 Will. 4. c. 15	23 August 1831
An Act to defray the Charge of the Pay, Clothing, and contingent and other Expenses of the Disembodied Militia in Great Britain and Ireland; and to grant Allowances in certain Cases to Subaltern Officers, Adjutants, Paymasters, Quartermasters, Surgeons, Assistant Surgeons, Surgeons Mates, and Serjeant Majors of the Militia, until the Thirtieth Day of June One thousand eight hundred and thirty-two. (Repealed by Statute Law Revision Act 1874 (37 & 38 Vict. c. 35))
Coal, etc., Duties Act 1831 (repealed)	1 & 2 Will. 4. c. 16	23 August 1831
An Act to discontinue or alter the Duties of Customs upon Coals, Slates, Cotton, Wool, Barilla, and Wax. (Repealed by Customs (Repeal) Act 1833 (3 & 4 Will. 4. c. 50))
Custos Rotulorum (Ireland) Act 1831 (repealed)	1 & 2 Will. 4. c. 17	23 August 1831
An Act to provide for the better Order and Government of Ireland, by Lieutenants for the several Counties, Counties of Cities, and Counties of Towns therein. (Repealed by Administration of Justice (Northern Ireland) Order 1975 (SI 1975/816))
Receipt and Remittance of Taxes, etc. Act 1831 (repealed)	1 & 2 Will. 4. c. 18	6 September 1831
An Act for transferring the Duties of Receivers General of the Land and Assessed Taxes to Persons executing the Offices of Inspectors of Taxes, and for making other Provisions for the Receipt and Remittance of the said Taxes. (Repealed by Taxes Management Act 1880 (43 & 44 Vict. c. 19))
Duties on Candles, Repeal Act 1831 (repealed)	1 & 2 Will. 4. c. 19	6 September 1831
An Act to repeal the Duties of Excise and Drawbacks on Candles. (Repealed by Statute Law Revision Act 1874 (37 & 38 Vict. c. 35))
Annuity for the Duchess of Kent Act 1831 (repealed)	1 & 2 Will. 4. c. 20	6 September 1831
An Act to enable His Majesty to grant an annual Sum to Her Royal Highness Victoria Maria Louisa Duchess of Kent, for a more adequate Provision for Her said Royal Highness, and for the honourable Support and Education of Her Royal Highness the Princess Alexandrina Victoria of Kent. (Repealed by Statute Law Revision Act 1874 (37 & 38 Vict. c. 35))
Land Tax Act 1831 (repealed)	1 & 2 Will. 4. c. 21	22 September 1831
An Act to explain and amend Two Acts of the Thirty-fourth (Note: Land Tax Act 1794 (34 Geo. 3. c. 8)) and Thirty-eighth (Note: Land Tax Act 1797 (38 Geo. 3. c. 5)) Years of His Majesty King George the Third, so far as the same relate to Double Assessments of the Land Tax. (Repealed by Finance Act 1949 (12, 13 & 14 Geo. 6. c. 47))
London Hackney Carriage Act 1831	1 & 2 Will. 4. c. 22	22 September 1831
An Act to amend the Laws relating to Hackney Carriages, and to Waggons, Carts, and Drays, used in the Metropolis; and to place the Collection of the Duties on Hackney Carriages and on Hawkers and Pedlars in England under the Commissioners of Stamps.
Quebec Civil Government Charges Act 1831 (repealed)	1 & 2 Will. 4. c. 23	22 September 1831
An Act to amend an Act of the Fourteenth Year of His Majesty King George the Third, (Note: Quebec Finance Act 1774 (14 Geo. 3. c. 88)) for establishing a Fund towards defraying the Charges of the Administration of Justice and Support of the Civil Government within the Province of Quebec in America. (Repealed by British North America Act 1840 (3 & 4 Vict. c. 35))
Advances for Public Works Act 1831 (repealed)	1 & 2 Will. 4. c. 24	22 September 1831
An Act to amend several Acts passed for authorizing the Issue of Exchequer Bills and the Advance of Money for carrying on Public Works and Fisheries and Employment of the Poor; and to authorize a further Issue of Exchequer Bills for the Purposes of the said Acts. (Repealed by Public Works Loans Act 1875 (38 & 39 Vict. c. 89))
Turnpikes Act 1831 (repealed)	1 & 2 Will. 4. c. 25	22 September 1831
An Act to amend the Acts for regulating Turnpike Roads in England, so far as they relate to certain Exemptions from Toll. (Repealed by Statute Law (Repeals) Act 1981 (c. 19))
Public Accounts (Ireland) Act 1831 (repealed)	1 & 2 Will. 4. c. 26	22 September 1831
An Act to amend an Act of the Fifty-second Year of the Reign of His Majesty King George the Third, (Note: Audit of Public Accounts (Ireland) Act 1812 (52 Geo. 3. c. 52)) respecting the Audit of the Public Accounts of Ireland; and to appoint the Number of Commissioners competent to grant Quietus to Public Accountants, under an Act passed in the Fifty-sixth Year of the Reign of His Majesty King George the Third, (Note: Consolidated Fund Act 1816 (56 Geo. 3. c. 98)) for consolidating the Public Revenues of Great Britain and Ireland. (Repealed by Statute Law Revision Act 1874 (37 & 38 Vict. c. 35))
County Clare Presentments Act 1831 (repealed)	1 & 2 Will. 4. c. 27	22 September 1831
An Act to enable the Treasurer of the County of Clare to issue his Warrants for the levying of the Presentments made at the Spring Assizes of the Year One thousand eight hundred and thirty-one. (Repealed by Statute Law Revision Act 1874 (37 & 38 Vict. c. 35))
Supply (No. 2) Act 1831 (repealed)	1 & 2 Will. 4. c. 28	27 September 1831
An Act to apply the Surplus of Ways and Means and a Sum out of the Consolidated Fund to the Service of the Year One thousand eight hundred and thirty-one. (Repealed by Statute Law Revision Act 1874 (37 & 38 Vict. c. 35))
Regents Park, Regent Street, etc. Act 1831	1 & 2 Will. 4. c. 29	27 September 1831
An Act to authorize and empower the Commissioners appointed by an Act of the Seventh Year of His late Majesty King George the Fourth, (Note: Regent Street, Carlton Place Act 1826 (7 Geo. 4. c. 77)) for extending to Charing Cross, the Strand, and Places adjacent, the Powers of an Act (Note: New Street Act 1813 (53 Geo. 3. c. 121)) for making a more convenient Communication from Mary-le-bone Park, to make and form a new Street from the Strand to Charles Street, Covent Garden, and to widen the North End of Bow Street into Long Acre; and for other Purposes.
Duties on Wine Act 1831 (repealed)	1 & 2 Will. 4. c. 30	5 October 1831
An Act to equalize the Duties on Wine. (Repealed by Customs (Repeal) Act 1833 (3 & 4 Will. 4. c. 50))
Judicature (Ireland) Act 1831 (repealed)	1 & 2 Will. 4. c. 31	5 October 1831
An Act to improve the Administration of Justice in Ireland. (Repealed by Civil Bill Courts (Ireland) Act 1851 (14 & 15 Vict. c. 57), Common Law Procedure Amendment Act (Ireland) 1853 (16 & 17 Vict. c. 113), Statute Law Revision Act 1874 (37 & 38 Vict. c. 35), Statute Law Revision (No. 2) Act 1888 (51 & 52 Vict. c. 57), Statute Law Revision Act 1891 (54 & 55 Vict. c. 67) and Statute Law Revision Act 1953 (2 & 3 Eliz. 2. c. 5))
Game Act 1831	1 & 2 Will. 4. c. 32	5 October 1831
An Act to amend the Laws in England relative to Game.
Public Works (Ireland) Act 1831 (repealed)	1 & 2 Will. 4. c. 33	15 October 1831
An Act for the Extension and Promotion of Public Works in Ireland. (Repealed by Glebe Loan (Ireland) Act 1870 (33 & 34 Vict. c. 112), Statute Law Revision Act 1874 (37 & 38 Vict. c. 35), Statute Law Revision Act 1890 (53 & 54 Vict. c. 33) and Statute Law Revision Act 1953 (2 & 3 Eliz. 2. c. 5))
Charity Commissioners Act 1831 (repealed)	1 & 2 Will. 4. c. 34	15 October 1831
An Act for appointing Commissioners to continue the Enquiries concerning Charities in England and Wales for Two Years, and from thence to the End of the then next Session of Parliament. (Repealed by Statute Law Revision Act 1874 (37 & 38 Vict. c. 35))
Officers of Common Law Courts Act 1831 (repealed)	1 & 2 Will. 4. c. 35	15 October 1831
An Act to explain and amend an Act (Note: Common Law Courts (England) Act 1830 (11 Geo. 4 & 1 Will. 4. c. 58)) for regulating the Receipt and future Appropriation of Fees and Emoluments receivable by Officers of the Superior Courts of Common Law. (Repealed by Statute Law Revision Act 1874 (37 & 38 Vict. c. 35))
Truck Acts Repeal Act 1831 (repealed)	1 & 2 Will. 4. c. 36	15 October 1831
An Act to repeal several Acts (Note: Payment of Lace Makers' Wages Act 1779 (19 Geo. 3. c. 49)) (Note: Payment of Cutters' Wages Act 1817 (57 Geo. 3. c. 115)) (Note: Payment of Colliers' Wages Act 1817 (57 Geo. 3. c. 122)) (Note: Payment of Workmen's Wages Act 1818 (58 Geo. 3. c. 51)) and Parts of Acts (Note: Cloths Act 1464 (4 Edw. 4. c. 1)) (Note: Drapers, etc. (Shrewsbury) Act 1566 (8 Eliz. 1. c. 7)) (Note: Partial Repeal of 8 Eliz. 1 c. 7 Act 1572 (14 Eliz. 1. c. 12)) (Note: Sheriffs Act 1702 (1 Ann. c. 18)) (Note: Coal Trade Act 1710 (9 Ann. c. 30)) (Note: Woollen Manufacture Act 1711 (10 Ann. c. 16)) (Note: Woollen Manufacture Act 1714 (1 Geo. 1. St. 2. c. 15)) (Note: Woollen Manufactures Act 1725 (12 Geo. 1. c. 34)) (Note: Woollen Manufacture Act 1726 (13 Geo. 1. c. 23)) (Note: Frauds of Workmen Act 1739 (13 Geo. 2. c. 8)) (Note: Frauds by Workmen Act 1748 (22 Geo. 2. c. 27)) (Note: Woollen Manufacture Act 1756 (29 Geo. 2. c. 33)) (Note: Woollen Manufactures Act 1757 (30 Geo. 2. c. 12)) (Note: Frauds by Workmen Act 1777 (17 Geo. 3. c. 56)) prohibiting the Payment of Wages in Goods, or otherwise than in the current Coin of the Realm. (Repealed by Statute Law Revision Act 1874 (37 & 38 Vict. c. 35))
Truck Act 1831 or the Money Payment of Wages Act 1831 (repealed)	1 & 2 Will. 4. c. 37	15 October 1831
An Act to prohibit the Payment, in certain Trades, of Wages in Goods, or otherwise than in the current Coin of the Realm. (Repealed by Wages Act 1986 (c. 48))
Church Building Act 1831 (repealed)	1 & 2 Will. 4. c. 38	15 October 1831
An Act to amend and render more effectual an Act passed in the Seventh and Eighth Years of the Reign of His late Majesty, intituled "An Act to amend the Acts for building and promoting the Building of additional Churches in populous Parishes." (Note: Church Building Act 1827 (7 & 8 Geo. 4. c. 72)) (Repealed by Isle of Man (Church Building and New Parishes) Act 1897 (60 & 61 Vict. c. 33) and Statute Law (Repeals) Act 1974 (c. 22))
Labour in Cotton Mills Act 1831 (repealed)	1 & 2 Will. 4. c. 39	15 October 1831
An Act to repeal the Laws relating to Apprentices and other young Persons employed in Cotton Factories and in Cotton Mills, and to make further Provisions in lieu thereof. (Repealed by Labour of Children, etc., in Factories Act 1833 (3 & 4 Will. 4. c. 103))
Customs Act 1831 (repealed)	1 & 2 Will. 4. c. 40	15 October 1831
An Act to repeal so much of an Act (Note: Customs, etc. Act 1825 (6 Geo. 4. c. 106)) for the Management of the Customs as allows certain Fees to be taken by Officers of the Customs; and to make further Regulations in respect thereof. (Repealed by Customs (Repeal) Act 1833 (3 & 4 Will. 4. c. 50))
Special Constables Act 1831 (repealed)	1 & 2 Will. 4. c. 41	15 October 1831
An Act for amending the Laws relative to the Appointment of Special Constables, and for the better Preservation of the Peace. (Repealed by Police Act 1964 (c. 48))
Poor Relief Act 1831 (repealed)	1 & 2 Will. 4. c. 42	15 October 1831
An Act to amend an Act of the Fifty-ninth Year of His Majesty King George the Third, (Note: Poor Relief Act 1819 (59 Geo. 3. c. 12)) for the Relief and Employment of the Poor. (Repealed by Poor Law Act 1927 (17 & 18 Geo. 5. c. 14))
Turnpike Roads (Scotland) Act 1831 (repealed)	1 & 2 Will. 4. c. 43	15 October 1831
An Act for amending and making more effectual the Laws concerning Turnpike Roads in Scotland. (Repealed by Statute Law Revision (No. 2) Act 1890 (53 & 54 Vict. c. 51))
Tumultuous Risings (Ireland) Act 1831	1 & 2 Will. 4. c. 44	15 October 1831
An Act to amend an Act passed in the Parliament of Ireland, in the Fifteenth and Sixteenth Years of the Reign of His Majesty King George the Third, intituled "An Act to prevent and punish tumultuous Risings of Persons within this Kingdom, and for other Purposes therein mentioned." (Note: Tumultuous Risings Act 1775 (15 & 16 Geo. 3. c. 21 (I)))
Augmentation of Benefices Act 1831 (repealed)	1 & 2 Will. 4. c. 45	15 October 1831
An Act to extend the Provisions of an Act passed in the Twenty-ninth Year of the Reign of His Majesty King Charles the Second, intituled "An Act for confirming and perpetuating Augmentations made by Ecclesiastical Persons to small Vicarages and Curacies; and for other Purposes." (Note: Augmentation of Benefices Act 1677 (29 Cha. 2. c. 8)) (Repealed by Statute Law (Repeals) Act 1971 (c. 52))
Barbados, etc., Customs Act 1831 (repealed)	1 & 2 Will. 4. c. 46	15 October 1831
An Act to allow the Importation of Lumber, and of Fish and Provisions, Duty-free, into the Islands of Barbadoes and Saint Vincent; and to indemnify the Governors and others for having permitted the Importation of those Articles Duty-free. (Repealed by Statute Law Revision Act 1874 (37 & 38 Vict. c. 35))
Arms (Ireland) Act 1831 (repealed)	1 & 2 Will. 4. c. 47	15 October 1831
An Act to revive, for One Year, Three Acts made in the Forty-seventh (Note: Possession of Arms (Ireland) Act 1807 (47 Geo. 3 Sess. 2. c. 54)) and Fiftieth (Note: Arms (Ireland) Act 1810 (50 Geo. 3. c. 109)) Years of the Reign of His Majesty King George the Third, and in the Tenth Year of the Reign of His late Majesty King George the Fourth, (Note: Arms (Ireland) Act 1829 (10 Geo. 4. c. 47)) for the preventing improper Persons from having Arms in Ireland, and to indemnify such Persons as may have acted in the Execution of and pursuant to the Provisions of the said Acts since the Expiration thereof. (Repealed by Statute Law Revision Act 1874 (37 & 38 Vict. c. 35))
County Infirmaries (Ireland) Act 1831 (repealed)	1 & 2 Will. 4. c. 48	15 October 1831
An Act to amend an Act passed in the Parliament of Ireland, in the Fifth Year of His Majesty King George the Third, (Note: County Hospitals Act 1765 (5 Geo. 3. c. 20 (I))) for establishing Public Hospitals in Ireland. (Repealed by Statute Law Revision (No. 2) Act 1890 (53 & 54 Vict. c. 51) and Health Services Act (Northern Ireland) 1948 (c. 3 (N.I.)))
Oaths, Galway Act 1831 (repealed)	1 & 2 Will. 4. c. 49	15 October 1831
An Act to repeal so much of an Act passed in Ireland, in the Fourth Year of King George the First, (Note: Galway Regulation and Protestant Interest Act 1717 (4 Geo. 1. c. 15 (I))) for the better regulating the Town of Galway and for strengthening the Protestant Interest therein, as limits the Franchise created by the said Act to Protestants only. (Repealed by Promissory Oaths Act 1871 (34 & 35 Vict. c. 48))
Fresh Wharf, London Act 1831 (repealed)	1 & 2 Will. 4. c. 50	15 October 1831
An Act to enable the Commissioners of His Majesty's Treasury to make a Conveyance of Fresh Wharf in the City of London. (Repealed by Statute Law (Repeals) Act 1978 (c. 45))
Valuation of Lands (Ireland) Act 1831 (repealed)	1 & 2 Will. 4. c. 51	20 October 1831
An Act to amend an Act of the Seventh Year of the Reign of His late Majesty King George the Fourth, (Note: Valuation of Lands (Ireland) Act 1826 (7 Geo. 4. c. 62)) for making Provision for the uniform Valuation of Lands and Tenements in the several Baronies, Parishes, and other Divisions of Counties in Ireland, for the Purpose of the more equally levying of the Rates and Charges upon the same. (Repealed by Valuation of Lands (Ireland) Act 1836 (6 & 7 Will. 4. c. 84))
Military Accounts (Ireland) Act 1831 (repealed)	1 & 2 Will. 4. c. 52	20 October 1831
An Act to repeal an Act passed in the Fifty-second Year of the Reign of His Majesty King George the Third, (Note: Audit of Military Accounts (Ireland) Act 1812 (52 Geo. 3. c. 51)) to provide for the more speedy Examination, controlling, and finally auditing the Military Accounts of Ireland. (Repealed by Statute Law Revision Act 1874 (37 & 38 Vict. c. 35))
Duties on Hops Act 1831 (repealed)	1 & 2 Will. 4. c. 53	20 October 1831
An Act to regulate the Payment of the Duties on Hop. (Repealed by Statute Law Revision Act 1874 (37 & 38 Vict. c. 35))
Appropriation Act 1831 (repealed)	1 & 2 Will. 4. c. 54	20 October 1831
An Act to apply the Sum of One million eight hundred thousand Pounds out of the Consolidated Fund to the Service of the Year One thousand eight hundred and thirty-one; and to appropriate the Supplies granted in this Session of Parliament. (Repealed by Statute Law Revision Act 1874 (37 & 38 Vict. c. 35))
Illicit Distillation (Ireland) Act 1831 (repealed)	1 & 2 Will. 4. c. 55	20 October 1831
An Act to consolidate and amend the Laws for suppressing the illicit making of Malt, and Distillation of Spirits in Ireland. (Repealed by Statute Law (Repeals) Act 1977 (c. 18))
Bankruptcy Court (England) Act 1831 (repealed)	1 & 2 Will. 4. c. 56	20 October 1831
An Act to establish a Court in Bankruptcy. (Repealed by Bankruptcy Repeal and Insolvent Court Act 1869 (32 & 33 Vict. c. 83))
Reclamation of Lands, etc. (Ireland) Act 1831 (repealed)	1 & 2 Will. 4. c. 57	20 October 1831
An Act to empower Landed Proprietors in Ireland to sink, embank, and remove Obstructions in Rivers. (Repealed by Statute Law Revision Act 1890 (53 & 54 Vict. c. 33))
Interpleader (England) Act 1831 (repealed)	1 & 2 Will. 4. c. 58	20 October 1831
An Act to enable Courts of Law to give Relief against adverse Claims made upon Persons having no Interest in the Subject of such Claims. (Repealed by Statute Law Revision and Civil Procedure Act 1883 (46 & 47 Vict. c. 49))
Crown Lands Allotments Act 1831 (repealed)	1 & 2 Will. 4. c. 59	20 October 1831
An Act to enable Churchwardens and Overseers to inclose Land belonging to the Crown for the Benefit of poor Persons residing in the Parish in which such Crown Land is situated. (Repealed by Poor Law Act 1927 (17 & 18 Geo. 5. c. 14))
Vestries Act 1831 or Hobhouse's Vestry Act (repealed)	1 & 2 Will. 4. c. 60	20 October 1831
An Act for the better Regulation of Vestries, and for the Appointment of Auditors of Accounts, in certain Parishes of England and Wales. (Repealed by Church of England (Miscellaneous Provisions) Measure 1992 (No. 1))

=== Local acts ===
Short title	Citation	Royal assent
Long title
Southampton Pier Act 1831 (repealed)	1 & 2 Will. 4. c. i	30 July 1831
An Act for erecting and maintaining a Pier and other Works for the more conveniently landing and embarking Passengers in the Port of the Town of Southampton. (Repealed by Southampton Harbour Act 1863 (26 & 27 Vict. c. cxix))
Lagan Bridge (Belfast) Act 1831	1 & 2 Will. 4. c. ii	30 July 1831
An Act for erecting and maintaining a Bridge over the River Lagan at Belfast, and for making suitable Approaches thereto.
Grosvenor Chapel Act 1831 (repealed)	1 & 2 Will. 4. c. iii	30 July 1831
An Act for the Establishment of a Chapel of Ease, to be called Grosvenor Chapel, in the Parish of Saint George Hanover Square in the County of Middlesex, and for providing for the Maintenance of the said Chapel, and a Stipend for the Minister thereof. (Repealed by Grosvenor Chapel Act 1899 (62 & 63 Vict. c. lxvi))
Ashton-under-Lyne Tithes Act 1831	1 & 2 Will. 4. c. iv	30 July 1831
An Act for settling disputed Rights respecting Tithes within the Parish of Ashton-under-Lyne in the County Palatine of Lancaster, and for fixing certain annual Payments in lieu thereof.
Writers to the Signet Widows' Fund Act 1831 (repealed)	1 & 2 Will. 4. c. v	30 July 1831
An Act for better raising and securing the Fund established for making Provision for the Widows of the Writers to His Majesty's Signet in Scotland. (Repealed by Writers to the Signet Widows' Fund Order Confirmation Act 1955 (4 & 5 Eliz. 2. c. ii))
Langton's Profits Act 1831	1 & 2 Will. 4. c. vi	30 July 1831
An Act to amend an Act (Note: Langton's Profits (Wood Seasoning Invention) Act 1829 (10 Geo. 4. c. cxxxv)) for vesting and securing to John Stephen Langton Esquire certain Profits and Emoluments for a limited Time.
Yorkshire Fire and Life Insurance Company Act 1831	1 & 2 Will. 4. c. vii	30 July 1831
An Act to enable the Yorkshire Fire and Life Insurance Company to sue and be sued in the Name of their Secretary, or of any One of the Directors of the said Company.
Glasgow Cross and Monteith Row Street Act 1831	1 & 2 Will. 4. c. viii	30 July 1831
An Aet to amend certain Acts passed in the Reign of Hie late Majesty King George the Fourth, for opening a Street from the Cross of Glasgow to Monteith Row.
Gorbals Statute Labour Act 1831	1 & 2 Will. 4. c. ix	30 July 1831
An Act to alter and amend an Act passed in the Sixth Year of the Reign of His late Majesty King George the Fourth, (Note: Gorbals Statute Labour Conversion Act 1825 (6 Geo. 4. c. cxl)) for regulating the Conversion of the Statute Labour within the Barony of Gorbals in the City of Glasgow and County of Lanark.
River Leven Drainage (Kinross and Fife) Act 1831	1 & 2 Will. 4. c. x	30 July 1831
An Act to amend and extend the Powers of an Act (Note: Kinross and Fife Drainage and Water Supply Act 1827 (7 & 8 Geo. 4. c. cv)) for recovering, draining, and preserving certain Lands, and for better supplying with Water the Mills, Manufactories, and other Works situated on the River Leven in the Counties of Kinross and Fife.
Bolton and Leigh Railway Act 1831 (repealed)	1 & 2 Will. 4. c. xi	30 July 1831
An Act to amend and enlarge the several Acts relating to the Bolton and Leigh Railway. (Repealed by Grand Junction Railway Act 1845 (8 & 9 Vict. c. cxcviii))
Avon and Gloucestershire Railway Act 1831	1 & 2 Will. 4. c. xii	30 July 1831
An Act to alter the Line of the Avon and Gloucester Rail Way, to make certain Branches from the same, and to amend the Act (Note: Avon and Gloucestershire Railway Act 1828 (9 Geo. 4. c. xciv)) for making the said Rail Way.
Darlington and Barton Lane End Turnpike Road Act 1831	1 & 2 Will. 4. c. xiii	30 July 1831
An Act for making a Turnpike Road (with a Branch therefrom) from the Angel Inn, near Darlington in the County of Durham, to Barton Lane End in the County of York.
Norwich and Cromer Road Act 1831 (repealed)	1 & 2 Will. 4. c. xiv	30 July 1831
An Act for more effectually repairing the Road from Norwich to Cromer in the County of Norfolk, and Two Branches of Road leading towards Holt and towards Wolterton in the said County. (Repealed by Statute Law (Repeals) Act 2008 (c. 12))
Road from Doncaster to Tadcaster Cross Act 1831 (repealed)	1 & 2 Will. 4. c. xv	30 July 1831
An Act for repairing and improving the Road from Doncaster, through Ferrybridge, to the South Side of Tadcaster Cross, in the West Riding of the County of York. (Repealed by Doncaster and Tadcaster Turnpike Road Act 1860 (23 & 24 Vict. c. cxviii))
Cheltenham Roads Act 1831 (repealed)	1 & 2 Will. 4. c. xvi	30 July 1831
An Act for more effectually repairing and improving several Roads leading into and from the Town of Cheltenham in the County of Gloucester, and for making new Branches of Roads to communicate therewith. (Repealed by Cheltenham Roads Act 1863 (26 & 27 Vict. c. li))
Thornset and Disley Road (Derbyshire, Cheshire) Act 1831 (repealed)	1 & 2 Will. 4. c. xvii	30 July 1831
An Act for making and maintaining a Road from Thornset in the County of Derby to Furnace Colliery within Disley in the County of Chester, and Two several Branches therefrom. (Repealed by Thornset and Disley Road Act 1833 (3 & 4 Will. 4. c. xix))
Monmouth Roads Act 1831 (repealed)	1 & 2 Will. 4. c. xviii	30 July 1831
An Act for more effectually repairing and improving several Roads therein mentioned, leading to, through, and from the Town of Monmouth, and for making several new Lines and Diversions of Road to communicate therewith, in the Counties of Monmouth, Gloucester, and Hereford. (Repealed by Monmouth Roads Act 1856 (19 & 20 Vict. c. lxxxix))
Barton and Brandon Bridge Road (Suffolk) Act 1831 (repealed)	1 & 2 Will. 4. c. xix	30 July 1831
An Act for repairing the Road from the Bridge on the old River at Barton to Brandon Bridge in the County of Suffolk. (Repealed by Statute Law (Repeals) Act 2008 (c. 12))
King's Lynn Roads Act 1831 (repealed)	1 & 2 Will. 4. c. xx	30 July 1831
An Act for more effectually repairing and otherwise improving the several Roads from the South Gate in the Borough of King's Lynn into the Parishes of East Walton, Narborough, Stoke Ferry, and Downham Market, in the County of Norfolk. (Repealed by Statute Law (Repeals) Act 2008 (c. 12))
King's Lynn and Castle Rising Roads Act 1831 (repealed)	1 & 2 Will. 4. c. xxi	30 July 1831
An Act for more effectually repairing the Roads from the Borough of King's Lynn, and other Roads therein mentioned, and for making a new Line of Road at Castle Rising, all in the County of Norfolk. (Repealed by Annual Turnpike Acts Continuance Act 1872 (35 & 36 Vict. c. 85))
Durham and Shotley Bridge Road Act 1831	1 & 2 Will. 4. c. xxii	30 July 1831
An Act for more effectually repairing and improving the Road between the City of Durham and the Village of Shotley Bridge in the County of Durham.
Breamish and Wooler Turnpike Roads Act 1831	1 & 2 Will. 4. c. xxiii	30 July 1831
An Act for consolidating the Trusts of certain Roads called the Breamish and Wooler Turnpike Roads in the County of Northumberland, and for more effectually improving and maintaining the same.
Handsworth and Hamstead Bridge Road (Staffordshire) Act 1831	1 & 2 Will. 4. c. xxiv	30 July 1831
An Act for more effectually maintaining and improving the Road from Soho Hill in the Parish of Handsworth to the Walsall Road on the Northern Side of Hamstead Bridge, and another Road from Brown's Green to the Friary, in the County of Stafford.
Wolverhampton Roads in Staffordshire and Salop Act 1831	1 & 2 Will. 4. c. xxv	30 July 1831
An Act for repairing and improving certain Roads in the Counties of Stafford and Salop, leading to and from the Town of Wolverhampton in the County of Stafford.
Abergavenny Roads Act 1831 (repealed)	1 & 2 Will. 4. c. xxvi	30 July 1831
An Act for more effectually repairing certain Roads leading to and from the Town of Abergavenny in the County of Monmouth, and for making and maintaining several new Branches of Road to communicate therewith. (Repealed by Abergavenny Roads Act 1863 (26 & 27 Vict. c. lix))
Kirkgate and Westgate (Wakefield) Road Act 1831 (repealed)	1 & 2 Will. 4. c. xxvii	30 July 1831
An Act for making and maintaining a Road from the Bottom of Kirkgate to the Bottom of Westgate, both in the Parish of Wakefield in the West Riding of the County of York. (Repealed by Wakefield Ings Turnpike Trust Act 1863 (26 & 27 Vict. c. clvi))
Teignmouth and Dawlish and Exeter Roads Act 1831 (repealed)	1 & 2 Will. 4. c. xxviii	30 July 1831
An Act to amend an Act of His late Majesty King George the Fourth, (Note: Teignmouth and Dawlish and Exeter Roads Act 1825 (6 Geo. 4. c. xcix)) for more effectually maintaining the Road from Teignmouth to Dawlish, and for making Roads from Dawlish to the Exeter Turnpike Roads, together with a Road from Southtown to Chudleigh, and certain Branches communicating with the same, all in the County of Devon; and to make and maintain other Roads communicating with the said Roads. (Repealed by Teignmouth and Dawlish and Exeter Roads Act 1836 (6 & 7 Will. 4. c. lxxxvi))
Liverpool, Prescot, Ashton and Warrington Roads Act 1831	1 & 2 Will. 4. c. xxix	30 July 1831
An Act for more effectually repairing, amending, and improving the Roads from Liverpool to Prescot, Ashton, and Warrington, in the County Palatine of Lancaster.
Vale of Blackmoor Turnpike Roads Act 1831	1 & 2 Will. 4. c. xxx	30 July 1831
An Act to continue and amend an Act of the Fifth Year of His late Majesty, (Note: Vale of Blackmoor Turnpike Roads Act 1824 (5 Geo. 4. c. cxlv)) for repairing the Roads from Durweston Bridge to Caundle Bishop, and other Roads, in the Counties of Dorset and Somerset, so far as relates to the Vale of Blackmoor Turnpike Roads.
Crediton and Chudleigh Turnpike Road Act 1831	1 & 2 Will. 4. c. xxxi	30 July 1831
An Act for making and maintaining a Turnpike Road from the South End of Mitford Bridge in the Parish of Tedburn Saint Mary to Chudleigh Bridge, and from Crockham Bridge to the Exeter Turnpike Road in Chudleigh, all in the County of Devon.
Roads in Somerset Act 1831 (repealed)	1 & 2 Will. 4. c. xxxii	30 July 1831
An Act for amending certain Roads in the County of Somerset, and for placing them and other Roads under the Care and Management of the Trustees of the Langport, Somerton, and Castle Cory Roads. (Repealed by Langport, Somerton and Castle Cary Turnpike Roads Act 1857 (20 & 21 Vict. c. lvi))
Lincoln County Offices Act 1831 (repealed)	1 & 2 Will. 4. c. xxxiii	2 August 1831
An Act to enable the Justices of the Peace for the Three Divisions of the County of Lincoln to purchase the Site of Lincoln Castle; and to empower the Court of Gaol Sessions for the said County to maintain and support the Judges House, County Hall, and Courts of Assize; and for other Purposes affecting the County at large. (Repealed by Statute Law (Repeals) Act 2013 (c. 2))
Rothesay Harbour and Burgh Offices and Bute County Offices Act 1831	1 & 2 Will. 4. c. xxxiv	2 August 1831
An Act for improving, repairing, and maintaining the Harbours of the Burgh of Rothesay in the County of Bute, and for building and maintaining a Gaol, Court House, and Offices for the said Burgh and County.
Rutherglen Railway Act 1831	1 & 2 Will. 4. c. xxxv	2 August 1831
An Act for making and maintaining a Railway from Rutherglen Green to Wellshot in the County of Lanark.
West Yorkshire Drainage Act 1831	1 & 2 Will. 4. c. xxxvi	2 August 1831
An Act for draining and improving certain Low Lands situate within the several Townships of Norton, Campsall, Askren, Moss, Fenwick, Little Smeaton, Stubbs Walden, Womersley, Whitley, Baln, Pollington, Snaith, and Cowick, and Sykehouse, in the several Parishes of Campsall, Womersley, Kellington, Snaith, and Fishlake, all in the West Riding of the County of York.
Wakefield and Austerlands Road Act 1831	1 & 2 Will. 4. c. xxxvii	2 August 1831
An Act for maintaining the Road from Wakefield to Austerlands in the West Riding of the County of York.
Roads in Stirling Act 1831	1 & 2 Will. 4. c. xxxviii	2 August 1831
An Act for making and repairing certain Roads leading across the County of Stirling, and other Roads in the said County.
Wendover and Buckingham Road (Amendment) Act 1831	1 & 2 Will. 4. c. xxxix	2 August 1831
An Act to amend an Act for more effectually repairing and improving the Road from Wendover to the Town of Buckingham in the County of Buckingham.
Huddersfield, Woodhead and Derby Road Act 1831	1 & 2 Will. 4. c. xl	2 August 1831
An Act for improving and maintaining the Road from the South Side of a Bridge over the River Colne, called Engine Bridge, in the Township of Huddersfield in the West Riding of the County of York, to Woodhead in the County Palatine of Chester, and from thence to a Bridge over the River Mersey, called Enterclough Bridge, on the Confines of the County of Derby.
Cirencester and Wootton Bassett Roads Act 1831	1 & 2 Will. 4. c. xli	2 August 1831
An Act for more effectually repairing and improving certain Roads leading to and from the Town of Cirencester in the County of Gloucester, and Wootton Bassett in the County of Wilts.
Forest of Dean Roads Act 1831 or the Dean Forest Roads Act 1831 (repealed)	1 & 2 Will. 4. c. xlii	2 August 1831
An Act to continue and amend an Act (Note: Forest of Dean Roads Act 1827 (7 & 8 Geo. 4. c. xii)) for more effectually repairing several Roads in and through His Majesty's Forest of Dean in the County of Gloucester, and to convert certain Highways in the Parishes of Staunton and Newland, in the said County, into Turnpike Roads. (Repealed by Forest of Dean Roads Act 1838 (1 & 2 Vict. c. xxxviii))
Wisbech and Thorney Road Act 1831	1 & 2 Will. 4. c. xliii	2 August 1831
An Act for repairing the Road from the Town of Wisbech in the Isle of Ely in the County of Cambridge to the Town of Thorney in the same Isle and County.
Road from Ludlow to Monk's Bridge Act 1831 (repealed)	1 & 2 Will. 4. c. xliv	2 August 1831
An Act for improving and maintaining the Road from Ludlow in the County of Salop, through Woofferton and Little Hereford, to Monk's Bridge in the said County, and also from Ludlow to Orlelon in the County of Hereford. (Repealed by Ludlow Turnpike Roads Act 1859 (22 & 23 Vict. c. lxxxix))
Edinburgh Improvement Act 1831	1 & 2 Will. 4. c. xlv	23 August 1831
An Act to alter and amend an Act passed in the Seventh and Eighth Year of the Reign of His late Majesty, intituled "An Act for carrying into effect certain Improvements within the City of Edinburgh, and adjacent to the same." (Note: Edinburgh Improvement Act 1827 (7 & 8 Geo. 4. c. lxxvi))
Dundee Burgh Extension Act 1831	1 & 2 Will. 4. c. xlvi	23 August 1831
An Act for extending the Royalty of the Burgh of Dundee, and for amending the Sett or Municipal Constitution of the said Burgh.
Highland Society of London Act 1831	1 & 2 Will. 4. c. xlvii	23 August 1831
An Act for repealing, altering, enlarging, and amending certain Provisions of an Act passed in the Fifty-sixth Year of the Reign of His late Majesty King George the Third, intituled "An Act for the Incorporation of the Highland Society of London, for the better Management of the Funds of the Society, and for rendering its Exertions more extensive and beneficial to the Public." (Note: Highland Society of London Act 1816 (56 Geo. 3. c. xx))
Worcester County Hall and Courts of Justice Act 1831 (repealed)	1 & 2 Will. 4. c. xlviii	23 August 1831
An Act for erecting a County Hall and Courts of Justice, and also for providing Accommodation for His Majesty's Justices of Assize, in and for the County of Worcester. (Repealed by Statute Law (Repeals) Act 1998 (c. 43))
St. Bridgett's Church (Liverpool) Act 1831 (repealed)	1 & 2 Will. 4. c. xlix	23 August 1831
An Act for endowing a Church called Saint Bridgett, in the Parish of Liverpool in the County Palatine of Lancaster. (Repealed by Liverpool and Wigan Churches Act 1904 (4 Edw. 7. c. c))
Llanelly Tithes Act 1831	1 & 2 Will. 4. c. l	23 August 1831
An Act for extinguishing Tithes, and customary Payments in lieu of Tithes, within the Parish of Llanelly in the County of Carmarthen, and for making Compensation in lieu thereof.
Norwich Poor Relief Act 1831	1 & 2 Will. 4. c. li	23 August 1831
An Act for the better Management of the Poor in the several Parishes and Hamlets in the City of Norwich and County of the same City.
West India Docks Act 1831 (repealed)	1 & 2 Will. 4. c. lii	23 August 1831
An Act to consolidate and amend the several Acts for making the West India Docks. (Repealed by Port of London (Consolidation) Act 1920 (10 & 11 Geo. 5. c. clxxiii))
General Steam Navigation Company Act 1831 (repealed)	1 & 2 Will. 4. c. liii	23 August 1831
An Act for granting certain Powers to a Company called "The General Steam Navigation Company." (Repealed by General Steam Navigation Company Act 1874 (37 & 38 Vict. c. viii))
Galway Navigation Act 1831 (repealed)	1 & 2 Will. 4. c. liv	23 August 1831
An Act to amend and enlarge the Powers of an Act passed in the Eleventh Year of the Reign of His late Majesty King George the Fourth, intituled "An Act for making and maintaining a Navigable Cut or Canal from Lough Corrib to the Bay of Galway, and for the Improvement of the Harbour of Galway." (Note: Galway Harbour Act 1830 (11 Geo. 4 & 1 Will. 4. c. cxxii)) (Repealed by Galway Harbour and Port Act 1853 (16 & 17 Vict. c. ccvii))
Belfast Port and Harbour Act 1831 (repealed)	1 & 2 Will. 4. c. lv	23 August 1831
An Act for the further Improvement of the Port and Harbour of Belfast in Ireland, and for other Purposes. (Repealed by Belfast Port and Harbour Act 1837 (7 Will. 4 & 1 Vict. c. lxxvi))
Ulster Canal Act 1831	1 & 2 Will. 4. c. lvi	23 August 1831
An Act to amend the several Acts for making and maintaining the Ulster Canal in the Counties of Fermanagh and Armagh.
Frodingham Inclosures Act 1831	1 & 2 Will. 4. c. lvii	23 August 1831
An Act for inclosing, draining, and warping Lands within the Townships or Hamlets of Frodingham, Scunthorpe, and Gunhouse (otherwise Gunnas), all in the Parish of Frodingham in the County of Lincoln.
Polloc and Govan Railway Act 1831	1 & 2 Will. 4. c. lviii	23 August 1831
An Act for amending an Act passed in the Eleventh Year of the Reign of His late Majesty King George the Fourth, (Note: Polloc and Govan Railway Act 1830 (11 Geo. 4 & 1 Will. 4. c. lxii)) for making and maintaining a Railway from the Lands of Polloc and Govan to the River Clyde; and to alter and extend the Powers of the Company of Proprietors of the said Railway.
Sheffield and Manchester Railway Act 1831	1 & 2 Will. 4. c. lix	23 August 1831
An Act for making a Railway from Manchester in the County Palatine of Lancaster to Sheffield in the West Riding of the County of York.
Manchester, Bolton and Bury Canal and Railway Act 1831	1 & 2 Will. 4. c. lx	23 August 1831
An Act to enable the Company of Proprietors of the Canal Navigation from Manchester to Bolton and to Bury to make and maintain a Railway from Manchester to Bolton and to Bury in the County Palatine of Lancaster, upon or near the Line of the said Canal Navigation, and to make and maintain a Collateral Branch to communicate therewith.
Roads in Forfar Act 1831	1 & 2 Will. 4. c. lxi	23 August 1831
An Act for more effectually making, amending, widening, repairing, and keeping in repair certain Roads in the County of Forfar.
Exeter Roads Act 1831 (repealed)	1 & 2 Will. 4. c. lxii	23 August 1831
An Act to amend an Act of His late Majesty King George the Fourth, (Note: Roads to and from Exeter Act 1826 (7 Geo. 4. c. xxv)) for repairing the several Roads leading to and from the City of Exeter, and for making certain new Lines of Road to communicate with the same, and for keeping in repair Exe Bridge and Countess Wear Bridge; and to make and maintain other Roads communicating with the said Roads. (Repealed by Exeter Turnpike Roads Act 1852 (15 & 16 Vict. c. cliv))
Aylesbury and Hockliffe Road Act 1831 (repealed)	1 & 2 Will. 4. c. lxiii	23 August 1831
An Act for more effectually repairing the Road from Aylesbury in the County of Buckingham to Hockliffe in the County of Bedford. (Repealed by Statute Law (Repeals) Act 2013 (c. 2))
Sunderland and Durham Road Act 1831	1 & 2 Will. 4. c. lxiv	23 August 1831
An Act for the more effectually repairing and otherwise improving the Road from Sunderland near the Sea in the County of Durham to the City of Durham.
Roads within the Kidwelly District Act 1831 (repealed)	1 & 2 Will. 4. c. lxv	23 August 1831
An Act for repairing and improving the several Roads within the Kidwelly District of Roads in the County of Carmarthen, and for making new Lines of Road within the said District, and building a Bridge across the River Lloughor at Spitty Bank, and a Bridge or Embankment across the River Gwendraith Fawr at the Ford. (Repealed by Turnpike Trusts in South Wales Act 1844 (7 & 8 Vict. c. 91))
Roads to and through Frome Act 1831	1 & 2 Will. 4. c. lxvi	23 August 1831
An Act for better repairing and improving several Roads leading to and from the Town of Frame in the County of Somerset.
Birmingham Poor Relief Act 1831	1 & 2 Will. 4. c. lxvii	6 September 1831
An Act for better regulating the Poor within the Parish of Birmingham in the County of Warwick; and for empowering the Guardians of the Poor to grant Building Leases of certain Lands vested in them, or otherwise to sell and dispose of the same, and to apply the Monies to arise therefrom in the Enlargement or rebuilding of the present Workhouse; and for other Purposes.
River Kennet Navigation Act 1831	1 & 2 Will. 4. c. lxviii	6 September 1831
An Act to alter and amend the several Acts for making navigable the River Kennet in the County of Berks.
Dublin and Kingstown Railway Act 1831	1 & 2 Will. 4. c. lxix	6 September 1831
An Act for making and maintaining a Railroad from Westland Row in the City of Dublin to the Head of the Western Pier of the Royal Harbour of Kingstown in the County of Dublin, with Branches to communicate therewith.
Tyrone Mail Coach Road Act 1831	1 & 2 Will. 4. c. lxx	6 September 1831
An Act for repairing and improving the Mail Coach Road through the County of Tyrone.
Fife, Kinross, Perth and Clackmannan Roads Act 1831	1 & 2 Will. 4. c. lxxi	6 September 1831
An Act for more effectually making and repairing certain Roads in the Counties of Fife, Kinross, Perth, and Clackmanan.
Road from North Shields to Newcastle-upon-Tyne Act 1831 (repealed)	1 & 2 Will. 4. c. lxxii	6 September 1831
An Act for more effectually repairing the Road from North Shields in the County of Northumberland to the Town of Newcastle upon Tyne, and certain Branches communicating therewith; and also for making and repairing additional Branches of Road. (Repealed by Newcastle-upon-Tyne and North Shields Road Act 1864 (27 & 28 Vict. c. cii))
Eau Brink Act 1831 or the Eau Brink Cut Act 1831	1 & 2 Will. 4. c. lxxiii	6 September 1831
An Act to alter, amend, and enlarge the Powers of the several Acts now in force relating to the new River or Cut from Eau Brink to Kings Lynn in the County of Norfolk, called the Eau Brink Cut; and to raise further Funds for carrying the said Acts into execution.
Pondyards and Chipping Barnet Road Act 1831 (repealed)	1 & 2 Will. 4. c. lxxiv	22 September 1831
An Act for more effectually improving the Road from the Pondyards in the County of Hertford, to the Town of Chipping Barnet in the same County. (Repealed by Annual Turnpike Acts Continuance Act 1871 (34 & 35 Vict. c. 115))
Ballinaspeg Demise Act 1831	1 & 2 Will. 4. c. lxxv	27 September 1831
An Act to repeal in part an Act passed in the Parliament of Ireland in the Thirty-second Year of the Reign of King George the Third, (Note: Estate of the Bishop of Cork Act 1792 (32 Geo. 3. c. 34 (I))) relating to a Portion of the Lands of Ballinaspeg, near the City of Cork, belonging to the See of Cork; and to enable the Bishops of that See to demise the same, under certain Restrictions.
London, Westminster and Home Counties Coal Trade Act 1831 (repealed)	1 & 2 Will. 4. c. lxxvi	5 October 1831
An Act for regulating the Vend and Delivery of Coals in the Cities of London and Westminster, and in certain Parts of the Counties of Middlesex, Surrey, Kent, Essex, Hertfordshire, Buckinghamshire, and Berkshire. (Repealed by City of London (Various Powers) Act 1967 (c. xlii))

=== Private acts ===
Short title	Citation	Royal assent
Long title
Harriet Herbert and John Edwards Estates Act 1831	1 & 2 Will. 4. c. 1 Pr.	30 July 1831
An Act to effect an Exchange of Lands between Harriet Averina Brunetta Herbert, an infant Ward of the Court of Chancery, and John Edwards Esquire.
Empowering the Court of Session to sell parts of the estate of Crieve (Dumfries and Roxburgh) for the discharge of debts and burdens, settling the estate of Murrayfield and others (Dumfries) and vesting in Thomas Beattie, in lieu, parts of the estate of Crieve.	1 & 2 Will. 4. c. 2 Pr.	30 July 1831
An Act to empower the Judges of the Court of Session in Scotland to take an Account of the Debts and Burdens affecting and that may be made to affect the Entailed Estate of Grieve, and others, in the Counties of Dumfries and Roxburgh, and to sell such Part of the said Estate as may be sufficient to discharge the said Debts and Burdens; and likewise for settling and securing the Lands and Estate of Murrayfield, and others, in the said County of Dumfries, to and in favour of Thomas Beattie of Crieve, Esquire, and the Series of Heirs entitled to take by a certain Deed of Entail made by Thomas Beattie of Crieve, Esquire, now deceased, and under the Conditions and Limitations contained in the said Deed; and for vesting in lieu thereof certain Parts of the Estate of Crieve in the said Thomas Beattie Esquire, and his Heirs and Assigns, in Fee Simple.
Enabling the Duke of Hamilton and Brandon and the heirs of entail of the lands and barony of Kinneil (Linlithgow) to charge any land or sleeches claimed from the sea off Kinneil with the costs thereby incurred.	1 & 2 Will. 4. c. 3 Pr.	30 July 1831
An Act to enable the Most Noble Alexander Duke of Hamilton and Brandon, and the Heirs of Entail of the Lands and Barony of Kinneil, in the Shire of Linlithgow, to charge the Sleeches or Land to be gained from the Sea opposite the said Barony with the Expences laid out in gaining the same.
William Preece and Dean and Canons of Windsor Estates Act 1831	1 & 2 Will. 4. c. 4 Pr.	30 July 1831
An Act to effect an Exchange of Estates in the County of Hereford between William Preece Esquire and the Dean and Canons of Windsor.
Lord Sinclair's Estate Act 1831	1 & 2 Will. 4. c. 5 Pr.	30 July 1831
An Act to empower the Judges of the Court of Session in Scotland to sell such Part of the Entailed Lands and Barony of West Nisbet in the County of Berwick, now belonging to Charles Carre Lord Sinclair, as shall be sufficient for Payment of the Provisions, Debts, and Incumbrances affecting the same.
Langley Inclosure Act 1831	1 & 2 Will. 4. c. 6 Pr.	30 July 1831
An Act for inclosing Lands in the Hamlet of Langley in the Parish of Claverdon in the County of Warwick.
Hatton, Haseley, and Wroxhall Inclosure Act 1831	1 & 2 Will. 4. c. 7 Pr.	30 July 1831
An Act for inclosing Lands in the several Parishes of Hatton, Haseley, and Wroxhall in the County of Warwick.
Rothbury Inclosure Act 1831	1 & 2 Will. 4. c. 8 Pr.	30 July 1831
An Act for inclosing Lands in the Parish of Rothbury in the County of Northumberland.
Kirkby-in-Kendal and Windermere Inclosure Act 1831	1 & 2 Will. 4. c. 9 Pr.	30 July 1831
An Act for inclosing Lands within the Townships or Divisions of Hugill, Applethwaite, and Troutbeck, in the Parishes of Kirkby-in-Kendal and Windermere, in the County of Westmorland.
Brown's Estate Act 1831	1 & 2 Will. 4. c. 10 Pr.	2 August 1831
An Act for enabling the Trustee under the Will of Henry Brown deceased to sell certain Shares in the Leeds and Liverpool Canal Navigation, (Note: Leeds and Liverpool Canal.) and a Share in the Liverpool Theatre, (Note: Theatre Royal, Liverpool.) and certain Bonds from the Liverpool Dock Trustees, and of a certain Sum due on Bond from the Corporation of Liverpool, and to apply the Money arising therefrom in repairing, pulling down, and rebuilding certain Houses in Paradise Street (Note: Paradise Street, Liverpool.) in the Town of Liverpool aforesaid; and for other the Purposes in this Act mentioned.
Tuckfield's Charity Act 1831	1 & 2 Will. 4. c. 11 Pr.	2 August 1831
An Act for enabling the Mayor, Bailiffs, and Commonalty of the City of Exeter to sell Two Houses in the Parish of Saint Stephen's, Exeter, vested in them, and to purchase other Estates for the Performance of the charitable Purposes of the Will of Joan Tuckfield.
Cameron's Estate Act 1831	1 & 2 Will. 4. c. 12 Pr.	23 August 1831
An Act for vesting the undivided Moieties of certain Estates of Nathaniel Cameron Esquire and Lætitia Pryce his Wife, in the County of Glamorgan, in Trustees, in Trust to sell, under the Directions of the High Court of Chancery, and to apply the Money to arise from such Sales in the Manner therein mentioned.
Oswald's Estate Act 1831	1 & 2 Will. 4. c. 13 Pr.	23 August 1831
An Act to exonerate the Trustees of Richard Oswald of Auchincruive, Esquire, for Advances of Money made by them to Richard Alexander Oswald Esquire, now of Auchincruive, and applied in executing Improvements, as well upon the Entailed Estates left by the said Richard Oswald as the Fee Simple Estates acquired by the said Trustees, and partly entailed by them; and to enable the said Trustees to discharge a Part of the Debts incurred by the said Richard Alexander Oswald in improving the said Estates.
Moray's Estate Act 1831	1 & 2 Will. 4. c. 14 Pr.	23 August 1831
An Act for vesting the Entailed Estates of Abercairney, and others, in the County of Perth, belonging to James Moray of Abercairney, Esquire, in Trustees, to sell the same or so much thereof as may be necessary, and to apply the Price arising therefrom in the Payment of the Debts affecting or that may be made to affect the said Lands and Estates.
Thompson and Wilson Estates Act 1831	1 & 2 Will. 4. c. 15 Pr.	23 August 1831
An Act for exchanging Part of the Freehold Estates devised by the Will of Beilby Thompson Esquire for Freehold Lands devised by the Will of Mrs. Dorothy Wilson to Trustees for charitable Purposes; and for amending an Act passed in the Third Year of His late Majesty King George the Fourth, intituled "An Act for empowering Trustees to sell and convey Part of the Freehold and Copyhold Estates in the County of York devised by the Will of Beilby Thompson Esquire, deceased, and Part of the Freehold Estates in the same County devised by the Will of Richard Thompson Esquire, deceased; and for laying out the Money arising from such Sales respectively, wider the Direction of the High Court of Chancery, in the Purchase of other Estates, to be settled to the same Uses." (Note: Beilby and Richard Thompson's Estates Act 1827 (3 Geo. 4. c. 24 Pr.))
Orford's Estate Act 1831	1 & 2 Will. 4. c. 16 Pr.	23 August 1831
An Act for vesting an undivided Moiety of a Freehold Estate in Liverpool in the County Palatine of Lancaster, late the Property of William Offord Esquire, deceased, in Trustees, for Sale, and for investing the Proceeds of such Sale for the Benefit of his infant Son and Heir at Law.
King Edward VI's Free Grammar School Act 1831 (repealed)	1 & 2 Will. 4. c. 17 Pr.	23 August 1831
An Act to enable the Governors of the Possessions, Revenues, and Goods of the Free Grammar School of King Edward the Sixth, in Birmingham in the County of Warwick, to erect a School House, Masters Houses, and other suitable Accommodations for the said School, and to extend the Objects of the Charity; and for other Purposes. (Repealed by Birmingham (King Edward the Sixth) School Act 1900 (63 & 64 Vict. c. lxiv))
Wolvercote Inclosure Act 1831	1 & 2 Will. 4. c. 18 Pr.	23 August 1831
An Act for inclosing Lands in the Parish of Wolvercote in the County of Oxford, and for commuting the Tithes of the said Parish.
Buchanan's Estate Act 1831	1 & 2 Will. 4. c. 19 Pr.	23 August 1831
An Act for vesting certain detached Portions of the Lands and Estates entailed by the deceased John Buchanan Esquire, of Carbeth in the County of Stirling, in Trustees, to sell the same, and to apply the Price arising therefrom in the Purchase of other Lands near to the Mansion House of Carbeth and the Remainder of the said Entailed Lands.
Aston juxta Birmingham Vicarage Act 1831	1 & 2 Will. 4. c. 20 Pr.	6 September 1831
An Act to effect a Partition of certain Freehold, Copyhold or Customary, and Leasehold Estates in the County of Lincoln, late the Property of the Right Honourable Sir Joseph Banks Baronet, deceased.
Antrobus's Estate Act 1831	1 & 2 Will. 4. c. 21 Pr.	22 September 1831
An Act for vesting in Trustees a legal Estate, which on the Death of Joseph Crewe escheated to His Majesty and the Lord Bishop of Bangor, in an undivided Third Part of certain Hereditaments in the County of Denbigh in order to effect a Partition directed by the Court of Chancery.
Marquis and Marchioness of Bute's and Lady Susan and Lady Georgiana North's Estates Act 1831	1 & 2 Will. 4. c. 22 Pr.	5 October 1831
An Act for effectuating a Partition of Estates belonging to the Most Honourable John Crichton Stuart Marquess of Bute and Earl of Dumfries and the Most Honourable Maria Marchioness of Bute and Countess of Dumfries, and their Trustees, and to the Right Honourable Lady Susan North, and to the Right Honourable Lady Georgina North; and for other Purposes.
Ferrybridge Inclosure Act 1831 (Note: This act was not printed by the King's Printer.)	1 & 2 Will. 4. c. 23 Pr.	14 June 1831 (Note: Start of session)
An Act for inclosing the several Open Common Fields, Mesne Inclosures, Ings, Common or Stinted Pastures, and Balks within the Manor and Township of Ferrybridge otherwise Ferryfryston in the West Riding of the County of York.
Trower's Divorce Act 1831	1 & 2 Will. 4. c. 24 Pr.	14 June 1831
An Act to dissolve the Marriage of Charles Trower Esquire with Amelia Catherine Trower his now Wife, and to enable him to marry again; and for other Purposes therein mentioned.
Chamberlayne's Name Act 1831	1 & 2 Will. 4. c. 25 Pr.	14 June 1831
An Act to enable Joseph Chamberlayne Wilkinson Ackerley otherwise Acherley, of the Town and County of the Town of Southampton, Esquire, to lay down and for ever cease to use the Surnames of Wilkinson and Ackerley otherwise Acherley, and to take the Name of Chamberlayne only, and bear the Arms of Chamberlayne quarterly with his own Family Arms, pursuant to the Will of his late Maternal Uncle Edmund John Chamberlayne Esquire, deceased.
Surman's Name Act 1831	1 & 2 Will. 4. c. 26 Pr.	14 June 1831
An Act to enable John Surman Goodlake to take and use the Sirname of Surman, pursuant to the Provisions of the Will of John Surman, late of Swindon, in the County of Gloucester, Gentleman, deceased.
Desvignes' Naturalization Act 1831	1 & 2 Will. 4. c. 27 Pr.	14 June 1831
An Act for naturalizing Peter Hubert Desvignes and George Desvignes.
Hebeler's Naturalization Act 1831	1 & 2 Will. 4. c. 28 Pr.	14 June 1831
An Act for naturalizing Bernhard Hebeler.
De Carvalho's Naturalization Act 1831	1 & 2 Will. 4. c. 29 Pr.	14 June 1831
An Act for naturalizing Custodio Pereira de Carvalho.
Isherwood's Estate Act 1831	1 & 2 Will. 4. c. 30 Pr.	14 June 1831
An Act for vesting certain Parts of the devised Estates of Thomas Bradshaw Isherwood Esquire, deceased, in Trustees, in Trust to be sold or demised for the Purposes therein mentioned.
Samwell's Name Act 1831	1 & 2 Will. 4. c. 31 Pr.	14 June 1831
An Act to enable Wenman Langham Watson Esquire, and his Issue Male, to take the Surname and use the Arms of Samwell, pursuant to the Will of Sir Thomas Samwell Baronet, deceased.
Ramié's Naturalization Act 1831	1 & 2 Will. 4. c. 32 Pr.	14 June 1831
An Act for naturalizing Charles Francis Ramié.
Levyssohn's Naturalization Act 1831	1 & 2 Will. 4. c. 33 Pr.	14 June 1831
An Act for naturalizing Edward Henry Levyssohn.
Le Feuvre's Divorce Act 1831	1 & 2 Will. 4. c. 34 Pr.	14 June 1831
An Act to dissolve the Marriage of Samuel Le Feuvre otherwise Le Fevre Esquire with Mary his now Wife, and to enable him to marry again; and for other Purposes.
Turton's Divorce Act 1831	1 & 2 Will. 4. c. 35 Pr.	14 June 1831
An Act to dissolve the Marriage of Louisa Turton with Thomas Edward Micheal Turton her now Husband, and to enable the said Louisa Turton to marry again; and for other Purposes therein mentioned.
Hugh Kinnaird's Divorce Act 1831	1 & 2 Will. 4. c. 36 Pr.	14 June 1831
An Act to dissolve the Marriage of Hugh Kinnaird Esquire with Ann his now Wife, and to enable him to marry again; and for other Purposes.
Flathmann's Naturalization Act 1831	1 & 2 Will. 4. c. 37 Pr.	14 June 1831
An Act for naturalizing Herman Hinrich Flathmann.
Etzerodt's Naturalization Act 1831	1 & 2 Will. 4. c. 38 Pr.	14 June 1831
An Act for naturalizing Christian Etzerodt.

=== Sources ===
- The Statutes of the United Kingdom of Great Britain and Ireland, 1 & 2 William IV. 1831. London. 1831 – via Internet Archive.
- The Statutes of the United Kingdom of Great Britain and Ireland, 1 & 2 William IV. 1831. London. 1831 – via Google Books.
- Journals of the House of Commons. Vol. 86. London: His Majesty's Stationery Office. pp. 521–935 – via Google Books.

== See also ==
- List of acts of the Parliament of the United Kingdom
