= John Morris (died 1682) =

English politician (c. 1625–1682)

Honourable John Morris
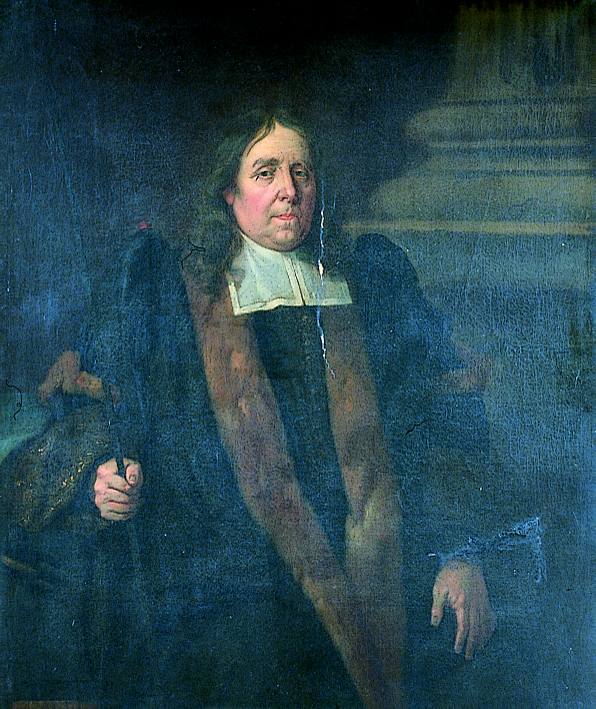
- Portrait of John Morris c.1669 by John Riley

Member of Parliament
- In office October 1679 – 1681
- Monarch: Charles II
- Constituency: Bletchingley

Alderman
- In office May 1669 – June 1669
- Constituency: Cheap

Personal details
- Occupation: Merchant banker

Military service
- Unit: Honourable Artillery Company

John Morris (c. 1625 – February 1682) was a prominent English merchant banker, lawyer, estate agent, Member of Parliament for Bletchingley, and Alderman for Cheap Ward in the City of London. Known for his significant contributions to London's financial sector, Morris also maintained influential ties with the City of London's political and commercial elite. He was as a partner of Sir Robert Clayton.

== Early life and career ==
John Morris was born around 1625, the second son of Robert Morris, a yeoman of Abingdon, Berkshire and his wife Frideswide, sister of Henry Avery of Radley, Berkshire. John had several siblings, including three brothers, one named Robert, and at least one sister, Frieswilde. In 1641 he attended the Abingdon School.

== Alderman of Cheap Ward and parliamentary service ==
On January 19, 1669, Lord Mayor (and Alderman) Sir William Turner and Sir G. Waterman nominated Morris to serve as Alderman for Cheap Ward. On May 26, 1669, Morris was sworn in as Alderman for Cheap Ward, one of the City of London's most important commercial districts. However, he stepped down on June 10, 1669, and paid a significant fine of £720 to avoid serving the full term. His replacement, John Man, a tallow chandler, was sworn in on June 24, 1669, with Morris continuing to serve as his vice. His portrait was painted by John Riley.

Morris's political career extended to House of Commons, where he was elected as a Member of Parliament (MP) for Bletchingley in October 1679 during the second Exclusion Parliament.

== Business endeavours and legacy ==
Mordant's Estate Act 1677
- Act of Parliament
- Parliament of England
- Long title: An Act to enable the Right Honourable the Lady Mary Mordant to make Sale of her Interest in the Manor of Blechingley, and divers Lands in the County of Surrey, notwithstanding her Minority.
- Citation: 29 Cha. 2. c. 3 Pr.
- Territorial extent: England and Wales

Dates
- Royal assent: 16 April 1677
- Commencement: 15 February 1677 (Note: Start of session.)

Status: Current legislation

As a partner in Clayton & Morris Co., John Morris played a pivotal role in the firm's success. He and Clayton acquired extensive properties in Surrey and Buckinghamshire, which they divided amicably in August 1678. Morris retained the estate at Hambleden, while Clayton became lord of the manor of Bletchingley, one of the trustees for the transaction was friend and counterpart John Evelyn. Among Clayton & Morris's more notable clients were the 2nd Duke of Buckingham and the Earl of Peterborough. In 1677, the manor of Bletchingley was sold to Sir Robert Clayton under a private act of Parliament, Mordant's Estate Act 1677 (29 Cha. 2. c. 3 Pr.), steered through committee by Thomas Neale, further cementing their business interests in the region. Morris also served as an Assistant of the Royal African Company from 1672 until his death.

== Family connections ==
John Morris's influence extended beyond his professional achievements. His nephew, Sir William Goulston, married Frideswide, the daughter of John's brother Robert Morris. This connection highlights the close familial ties that underpinned Morris's social and professional networks. He was also the great-uncle of William Morris, a member of the Worshipful Company of Drapers, and Freeman of the City of London, who continued the family's tradition of commerce and civic involvement into the 18th century.
