= Naturalization (Children Born Abroad During the Troubles) Act 1677 =

Act of the Parliament of England

- Act of Parliament
- Parliament of England
- Long title: An Act for the Naturalizing of Children of his Majestyes English Subjects borne in Forreigne Countryes during the late Troubles.
- Citation: 29 Cha. 2. c. 6
- Territorial extent: England and Wales

Dates
- Royal assent: 16 April 1677
- Commencement: 15 February 1677 (Note: Start of session.)
- Repealed: 30 July 1948

Other legislation
- Repealed by: Statute Law Revision Act 1948

Status: Repealed

Text of statute as originally enacted

The Naturalization (Children Born Abroad During the Troubles) Act 1677 (29 Cha. 2. c. 6) was an act of the Parliament of England passed following the Restoration of the monarchy in 1660. During the English Civil War (1642 to 1651) and the English Commonwealth (1649 to 1660), many people had fled the country for their safety. Consequently their children born abroad were not natural born subjects, and so the act was passed to naturalise them. Provided that they had a parent who was a natural born citizen, anyone born abroad between 14 June 1641 and 24 March 1660 (Old Style; 1661 New Style) was to become a natural born subject as if they had been born in England.

However, people naturalised under the act (other than five individuals named in the act) could only inherit property or bring an action in court if within seven years of the act being passed they received the Sacrament of the Lord's Supper and took the Oath of Allegiance and the Oath of Supremacy, and proved in court that they had done so, with witnesses. They would then be given a certificate to prove they had done so.

== People named in the act ==
There were five people named in section 1, who did not have to go through the formalities required of everyone else. They were:

- Charles Gerard, later the 2nd Earl of Macclesfield
- Elizabeth Gerard (sister of Charles)
- Trevor Wheler (son of Sir Charles Wheler)
- Dorothy Elizabeth Wheler (daughter of Sir Charles)
- Anne Ravenscroft (wife of Edward Ravenscroft)

== Subsequent developments ==
The whole act was repealed by section 1 of, and the first schedule to, the Statute Law Revision Act 1948 (11 & 12 Geo. 6. c. 62), which came into force on 30 July 1948.
