= Illicit Distillation (Ireland) Act 1831 =

Act of the Parliament of the United Kingdom

Illicit Distillation (Ireland) Act 1831 (Note: The citation of this act by this short title was authorised by section 1 of, and the first schedule to, the Short Titles Act 1896. Due to the repeal of those provisions it is now authorised by section 19(2) of the Interpretation Act 1978.)
- Act of Parliament
- Parliament of the United Kingdom
- Long title: An Act to consolidate and amend the Laws for suppressing the illicit making of Malt, and Distillation of Spirits in Ireland.
- Citation: 1 & 2 Will. 4. c. 55
- Territorial extent: United Kingdom

Dates
- Royal assent: 20 October 1831
- Commencement: 1 December 1831 (Note: Section 55.)
- Repealed: 16 June 1977
Other legislation
Amends	See § Repealed enactments
Repeals/revokes	See § Repealed enactments
Amended by	Inland Revenue Act 1868; Statute Law Revision Act 1874; Inland Revenue Act 1880; Statute Law Revision (No. 2) Act 1890; Statute Law Revision Act 1892; Statute Law Revision Act 1953; Statute Law (Repeals) Act 1976
Repealed by	Statute Law (Repeals) Act 1977

Status: Repealed

Text of statute as originally enacted

The Illicit Distillation (Ireland) Act 1831 (1 & 2 Will. 4. c. 55) was an act of the Parliament of the United Kingdom that consolidated enactments related to illicit distillation in Ireland.

== Provisions ==
=== Repealed enactments ===
Section 54 of the act repealed 12 enactments, listed that section act.

Citation	Short title	Description	Extent of repeal
46 Geo. 3. c. 88	Duties on Spirits (Ireland) (No. 2) Act 1806	An Act passed in the Forty-sixth Year of the Reign of His late Majesty King George the Third, intituled An Act to provide for the regulating and securing the Collection of the Duties on Spirits distilled in Ireland, and the warehousing of such Spirits for Exportation.	The whole act.
47 Geo. 3. Sess. 2. c. 17	Duties on Spirits (Ireland) Act 1807	An Act passed in the Forty-seventh Year of the Reign of His said Majesty, intituled An Act to amend an Act made in the Forty- sixth Year of His present Majesty, for the regulating and securing the Collection of the Duties on Spirits distilled in Ireland.	The whole act.
48 Geo. 3. c. 81	Duties on Spirits (Ireland) Act 1808	An Act passed in the Forty-eighth Year of His said lateMajesty's Reign, intituled An Act to amend the several Acts for the regulating and securing the Collection of the Duty on Spirits distilled in Ireland.	The whole act.
49 Geo. 3. c. 99	Spirits (Ireland) Act 1809	An Act passed in the Forty-ninth Year of His said Majesty's Reign, intituled An Act to amend the several Acts for the regulating and securing the Collection of the Duties on Spirits distilled in Ireland, and for regulating the Sale of such Liquors by Retail.	As relates to the regulating and securing the Duties on Spirits, and the Imposition of Penalties for illicit Distillation.
50 Geo. 3. c. 99	Making of Malt, etc. (Ireland) Act 1810	An Act passed in the Fiftieth Year of His said Majesty's Reign, intituled An Act to amend the several Acts relating to the making of Malt, and the granting ofPermits and Certificates, and the Regulations of Braziers and of Persons employing more than One Still in Ireland.	The whole act.
52 Geo. 3. c. 97	Inland Excise and Taxes (Ireland) Act 1812	An Act passed in the Fifty-second Year of His said Majesty's Reign, intituled An Act to amend several Acts relating to the Revenue of Inland Excise and Taxes in Ireland.	The whole act.
54 Geo. 3. c. 150	Distillation of Spirits (Ireland) Act 1814	An Act passed in the Fifty- fourth Year of His said Majesty's Reign, intituled An Act to consolidate and amend the Regulations contained in several Acts of Parliament for imposing and levying of Fines upon Parishes, Townlands, and other Places, in respect of the unlawful Distillation of Spirits in Ireland.	The whole act.
55 Geo. 3. c. 12	Unlawful Distillation, etc. (Ireland) Act 1814	An Act passed in the same Fifty-fifth Year, intituled AnAct to amend several Acts relating to Fines in respect of unlawful Distillation in Ireland, to the warehousing of Spirits, and to the securing the Duties of Excise on Spirits distilled, and on Hides and Skins tanned in Ireland.	The whole act.
55 Geo. 3. c. 111	Duties on Spirits (Ireland) Act 1815	An Act passed in the Fifty-fifth Year of His said Majesty's Reign, intituled An Act for the better collecting and securing the Duties on Spirits distilled in Ireland.	The whole act.
55 Geo. 3. c. 151	Distillation of Spirits (Ireland) Act 1815	An passed in the same Fifty-fifth Year, intituled An Act to amend the Laws for imposing and levying of Fines in respect of unlawful Distillation of Spirits in Ireland.	The whole act.
56 Geo. 3. c. 112	Distillation of Spirits (Ireland) Act 1816	An Act passed in the Fifty-sixth Year of His said Majesty's Reign, intituled An Act to make certain Provisions for modifying the several Acts for imposing and levying of Fines in respect of unlawful Distillation of Spirits in Ireland.	The whole act.
59 Geo. 3. c. 98	Distillation of Spirits (Ireland) Act 1819	An Act passed in the Fifty-ninth Year of His said Majesty's Reign, intituled An Act to limit the Continuance of the Operation of the severalActs for imposing Fines upon Townlands andPlaces in Ireland, in respect of Offences relating to the unlawful Distillation of Spirits; and to amend the said Acts; and to provide for the more effectual Prevention or Suppression of such Offences.	The whole act.

== Subsequent developments ==
The following enactments were repealed by section 1 of, and the first schedule to, the Statute Law Revision Act 1953 (2 & 3 Eliz. 2. c. 5), which came into force on 18 December 1953.

- The preamble.
- In section 49, from the beginning to the words " hereto annexed; and ".
- The Schedule.

Section 49 of the act was repealed by section 1(1) of, and part XIX of schedule 1 to, the Statute Law (Repeals) Act 1976, which came into force on 27 May 1976.

The whole act was repealed by section 1(1) of, and part X of schedule 1 to, the Statute Law (Repeals) Act 1977, which came into force on 16 June 1977.
