= Augmentation of Benefices Act 1677 =

Act of the Parliament of England

Augmentation of Benefices Act 1677 (Note: The citation of this act by this short title was authorised by section 5 of, and the second schedule to, the Statute Law Revision Act 1948. Due to the repeal of those provisions, it is now authorised by section 19(2) of the Interpretation Act 1978.)
- Act of Parliament
- Parliament of England
- Long title: An Act for confirming and perpetuating Augmentations made by Ecclesiasticall Persons to small Vicarages and Curacies. (Note: These words are printed against this act in the second column of the second schedule to the Statute Law Revision Act 1948, which is headed "Title".)
- Citation: 29 Cha. 2. c. 8
- Territorial extent: England and Wales

Dates
- Royal assent: 16 April 1677
- Commencement: 15 February 1677 (Note: Start of session.)
- Repealed: 27 July 1971
Other legislation
Amended by	Augmentation of Benefices Act 1831; Statute Law Revision Act 1888; Charities Act 1960
Repealed by	Statute Law (Repeals) Act 1971

Status: Repealed

Text of statute as originally enacted

The Augmentation of Benefices Act 1677 (29 Cha. 2. c. 8) was an act of the Parliament of England.

== Subsequent developments ==
The whole act was repealed by section 1 of, and the part II of the schedule to, the Statute Law (Repeals) Act 1971, which came into force on 27 July 1971.
