= List of acts of the Parliament of England from 1677 =

This is a list of acts of the Parliament of England for the year 1677.

For acts passed during the period 1707–1800, see the list of acts of the Parliament of Great Britain. See also the list of acts of the Parliament of Scotland, and the list of acts of the Parliament of Ireland.

For acts passed from 1801 onwards, see the list of acts of the Parliament of the United Kingdom. For acts of the devolved parliaments and assemblies in the United Kingdom, see the list of acts of the Scottish Parliament, the list of acts of the Northern Ireland Assembly, and the list of acts and measures of Senedd Cymru; see also the list of acts of the Parliament of Northern Ireland.

For medieval statutes, etc. that are not considered to be acts of Parliament, see the list of English statutes.

See also the List of ordinances and acts of the Parliament of England, 1642–1660 for ordinances and acts passed by the Long Parliament and other bodies without royal assent, and which were not considered to be valid legislation following the Restoration in 1660.

The number shown after each act's title is its chapter number. Acts are cited using this number, preceded by the years of the reign during which the relevant parliamentary session was held; thus the Union with Ireland Act 1800 is cited as "39 & 40 Geo. 3. c. 67", meaning the 67th act passed during the session that started in the 39th year of the reign of George III and which finished in the 40th year of that reign. The modern convention is to use Arabic numerals in citations (thus "41 Geo. 3" rather than "41 Geo. III"). Acts of the last session of the Parliament of Great Britain and the first session of the Parliament of the United Kingdom are both cited as "41 Geo. 3".

Acts passed by the Parliament of England did not have a short title; however, some of these acts have subsequently been given a short title by acts of the Parliament of the United Kingdom, such as the Short Titles Act 1896 (59 & 60 Vict. c. 14).

Acts passed by the Parliament of England were deemed to have come into effect on the first day of the session in which they were passed. Because of this, the years given in the list below may in fact be the year before a particular act was passed.

== 29 Cha. 2 ==
The fifteenth session of the 2nd Parliament of King Charles II (the 'Cavalier Parliament'), which met from 15 February 1677 until 25 April 1677.

This session was traditionally cited as 29 Car. 2 (Chronological Table of the Statutes), 29 Chas. 2 or 29 C. 2.

=== Public acts ===
Short title	Citation	Royal assent
Long title
Taxation Act 1677 (repealed)	29 Cha. 2. c. 1	16 April 1677
An Act for raising the Summe of Five hundred eighty foure thousand nine hundred seaventy eight pounds two shillings and two pence halfe-penny for the speedy building Thirty Shipps of Warr. (Repealed by Statute Law Revision Act 1863 (26 & 27 Vict. c. 125))
Taxation (Beer and Ale) Act 1677 (repealed)	29 Cha. 2. c. 2	16 April 1677
An Act for an additionall Excise upon Beere, Ale and other Liquors for Three years. (Repealed by Statute Law Revision Act 1863 (26 & 27 Vict. c. 125))
Statute of Frauds	29 Cha. 2. c. 3	16 April 1677
An Act for prevention of Frauds and Perjuryes.
Southwark Fire Property Disputes Act 1677 (repealed)	29 Cha. 2. c. 4	16 April 1677
An Act for erecting a Judicature to determine Differences touching Houses burnt and demolished by the late dread full Fire in Southwarke. (Repealed by Statute Law (Repeals) Act 1993 (c. 50))
Affidavits Act 1677 (repealed)	29 Cha. 2. c. 5	16 April 1677
An Act for takeing of Affidavits in the Country to be made use of in the Courts of Kings Bench Common Pleas and Exchequer. (Repealed by Civil Procedure Acts Repeal Act 1879 (42 & 43 Vict. c. 59))
Naturalization (Children Born Abroad During the Troubles) Act 1677 (repealed)	29 Cha. 2. c. 6	16 April 1677
An Act for the Naturalizing of Children of his Majestyes English Subjects borne in Forreigne Countryes during the late Troubles. (Repealed by Statute Law Revision Act 1948 (11 & 12 Geo. 6. c. 62))
Sunday Observance Act 1677 (repealed)	29 Cha. 2. c. 7	16 April 1677
An Act for the better Observation of the Lords Day commonly called Sunday. (Repealed by Statute Law Revision Act 1948 (11 & 12 Geo. 6. c. 62), Justices of the Peace Act 1949 (12, 13 & 14 Geo. 6. c. 101), Statute Law (Repeals) Act 1969 (c. 52))
Augmentation of Benefices Act 1677 (repealed)	29 Cha. 2. c. 8	16 April 1677
An Act for confirming and perpetuating Augmentations made by Ecclesiasticall Persons to small Vicarages and Curacies. (Repealed by Statute Law (Repeals) Act 1971 (c. 52))
Ecclesiastical Jurisdiction Act 1677 (repealed)	29 Cha. 2. c. 9	16 April 1677
An Act for takeing away the Writt De Heretico cumburendo. (Repealed by Ecclesiastical Jurisdiction Measure 1963 (No. 1))
Yarmouth Haven and Pier Repairs (Continuance of Duties) Act 1677 (repealed)	29 Cha. 2. c. 10	16 April 1677
An Act for the better repairing and maintaining the Piere of Great Yarmouth. (Repealed by Statute Law Revision Act 1948 (11 & 12 Geo. 6. c. 62))

=== Private acts ===
Short title	Citation	Royal assent
Long title
Earl of Manchester's Estate Act 1677	29 Cha. 2. c. 1 Pr.	16 April 1677
An Act to enable Robert Earl of Manchester to sell Lands, for Payment of his Debts, and for settling other Lands of a greater Value in Lieu of those appointed to be sold.
Mainard's Estate Act 1677	29 Cha. 2. c. 2 Pr.	16 April 1677
An Act for rectifying a Mistake in a general Settlement of the Lord Maynard's Estate upon the Marriage of his Son.
Mordant's Estate Act 1677	29 Cha. 2. c. 3 Pr.	16 April 1677
An Act to enable the Right Honourable the Lady Mary Mordant to make Sale of her Interest in the Manor of Blechingley, and divers Lands in the County of Surrey, notwithstanding her Minority.
Viscount Kilmorey's Estate Act 1677	29 Cha. 2. c. 4 Pr.	16 April 1677
An Act for the Payment of the Debts of Charles late Lord Viscount Kilmorey, of the Kingdom of Ireland; and for raising of Portions for Byron Needham and Charles Needham, Two of his younger Sons.
Compton Estate Act 1677	29 Cha. 2. c. 5 Pr.	16 April 1677
An explanatory and supplemental Act for the better enabling Sir Francis Compton to make Sale and dispose of the Manor of Hamerton, or any Part thereof, in the County of Huntington.
Hungerford House Act 1677	29 Cha. 2. c. 6 Pr.	16 April 1677
An Act to enable Sir Edward Hungerford, knight of the Bath, to make Leases for Years of Hungerford House in the Strand, in the Parish of St. Martine's in the Feilds, in the County of Midd. and of certain Houses and Tenements thereunto adjoining.
Awbrey's Estate Act 1677	29 Cha. 2. c. 7 Pr.	16 April 1677
An Act to enable Herbert Awbrey and his Trustees to sell Lands, for Payment of his Debts.
All Hallows Northampton Tithes Act 1677	29 Cha. 2. c. 8 Pr.	16 April 1677
An Act for settling a Maintenance for the Vicar of Allhallowes, in the Town of North'ton.
Barkley's Estate Act 1677	29 Cha. 2. c. 9 Pr.	16 April 1677
An Act to enable Thomas Barkeley and his Trustees to sell Lands, for Payment of the Debts of the said Thomas Barkeley, and raising Portions for his Younger Children.
Rushot's Naturalization Act 1677	29 Cha. 2. c. 10 Pr.	16 April 1677
An Act for the naturalizing of Alice Rushout, Daughter of Sir James Rushout Baronet.
David's Naturalization Act 1677	29 Cha. 2. c. 11 Pr.	16 April 1677
An Act for the Naturalization of Jacob David and others.
Reneu's Naturalization Act 1677	29 Cha. 2. c. 12 Pr.	16 April 1677
An Act for the Naturalization of Peter Reneu and others.
Standish's Estate Act 1677	29 Cha. 2. c. 13 Pr.	16 April 1677
An Act to enable Trustees to sell Lands, for Payment of the Debts of Edward Standish Esquire.
Squibb's Estate Act 1677	29 Cha. 2. c. 14 Pr.	16 April 1677
An Act for the Sale of certain Lands in Winterborne Whitchurch, in the County of Dorset, lately belonging to Laurance Squib Esquire, deceased.

=== Sources ===
- Raithby, John, ed. (1963) [1819]. "29° Car. II.". Statutes of the Realm. Vol. 5: The Statutes of King Charles I and King Charles II (1625–1680). London: Dawsons. pp. 802–851 – via HathiTrust.
- Raithby, John, ed. (1819). Statutes of the Realm. Vol. 5: 1628-80 – via British History Online.
- Pickering, Danby, ed. (1763). "Anno vicesimo nono Caroli II". The Statutes at Large. Vol. 8: From the Twelfth Year of King Charles II to the Last Year of King James II. Inclusive. Cambridge: Joseph Bentham. pp. 404–417 – via Internet Archive.
- Journal of the House of Commons. Vol. 9. London: His Majesty's Stationery Office. 1803. pp. 382–423 – via Google Books.
- Chronological Table of and Index to the Statutes. Vol. 1: To the End of the Session 59 Vict. Sess. 2 (1895) (13th ed.). London: Her Majesty's Stationery Office. 1896. p. 73 – via Google Books.
- "Acts of the English Parliament from 1677". legislation.gov.uk. The National Archives.
- Chronological Table of the Statutes: Covering the Period from 1235 to the End of 1971. London: Her Majesty's Stationery Office. 1972. pp. 70–71. ISBN 978-0-11-840096-1 – via Google Books.
- "Chronological Tables of the Private and Personal Acts: Part 3 (1660–1680)". legislation.gov.uk. The National Archives.

== 29 & 30 Cha. 2 ==
Continuing the fifteenth session of the 2nd Parliament of King Charles II (the 'Cavalier Parliament') from 28 January 1678 until 13 May 1678.

This session was traditionally cited as 29 & 30 Car. 2; it is listed in the "Chronological Table of the Statutes" as 29 & 30 Car. 2.

=== Public acts ===
Short title	Citation	Royal assent
Long title
Taxation, etc. Act 1677 (repealed)	29 & 30 Cha. 2. c. 1	20 March 1678
An Act for raising Money by a Poll and otherwise to enable His Majestie to enter into an actuall Warr against the French King and for prohibiting severall French Commodities. (Repealed by Statute Law Revision Act 1863 (26 & 27 Vict. c. 125))
Moss Troopers Act 1677 (repealed)	29 & 30 Cha. 2. c. 2	20 March 1678
An Act for continuance of two former Acts (Note: Moss Troopers Act 1662 (14 Cha. 2. c. 22)) (Note: Moss Troopers Act 1666 (18 & 19 Cha. 2. c. 3)) for preventing of Theft and Rapine upon the Northerne Borders of England. (Repealed by Statute Law Revision Act 1863 (26 & 27 Vict. c. 125))

=== Private acts ===
Short title	Citation	Royal assent
Long title
West Derby and Wavertree Manors Act 1677	29 & 30 Cha. 2. c. 3 Pr.	20 March 1678
An Act for ascertaining and establishing the Interest of the Lord and Copyhold Tenants of the Manors of West Derby and Wavertree, in the County Palatine of Lancaster, in relation to their Fines and Commons.
Earl of Warwick and Holland's Estate Act 1677	29 & 30 Cha. 2. c. 4 Pr.	20 March 1678
An Act to enable the Guardian of the Right Honourable Edward Earl of Warwicke and Holland to make Leases of several Messuages herein after mentioned, during his Minority, rendering the improved Rent.
Lord Morley and Mounteagle's Estate Act 1677	29 & 30 Cha. 2. c. 5 Pr.	20 March 1678
An Act to enable the Right Honourable Thomas Lord Morley and Mounteagle, Baron of Rye, to make Sale of the Manor of Farleton, and certain Lands and Hereditaments in Farleton, in the County of Lancaster, for Payment of Debts.
Viscount Cullen's Estate Act 1677	29 & 30 Cha. 2. c. 6 Pr.	20 March 1678
An Act to enable the Trustees of Brian Viscount Cullen, of the Realm of Ireland, to sell or dispose of Lands in Elmesthorpe, in the County of Leicester, for the Payment of Debts, and raising a Portion for his Daughter.
Cobham House and Park Act 1677	29 & 30 Cha. 2. c. 7 Pr.	20 March 1678
An Act to enable Trustees to raise Money upon Cobham House and Parke.
Cotton's Estate Act 1677	29 & 30 Cha. 2. c. 8 Pr.	20 March 1678
An Act to enable Sir John Cotton Baronet to dispose of a Messuage called St. Germans, and Lands therewith used, near St. Albans, in the County of Hertford, and to settle other Lands in Lieu thereof.
Rodes' Estate Act 1677	29 & 30 Cha. 2. c. 9 Pr.	20 March 1678
An Act for Confirmation of a Decree made in the Court of Chancery, the 24th Day of February, A° Regni Regis Car. 2di 27°, in a Cause between Sir Francis Rodes Baronet, since deceased, and Dame Martha his Wife, and William Thornton his Guardian, and John Thornton and the said Cyprian Thornton Defendants, of several Conveyances and Assurances made by the said Sir Francis Rodes in Pursuance thereof, as well for Payment of his Debts, as for Provision for his Wife and Children.
Coke's Estate Act 1677	29 & 30 Cha. 2. c. 10 Pr.	20 March 1678
An Act to supply the Defects in a Deed of Settlement made by John Coke Esquire, deceased, and for altering a Trust in Part of the Estate of Robert Coke Esquire.
Thynne's Estate Act 1677	29 & 30 Cha. 2. c. 11 Pr.	20 March 1678
An Act to enable Thomas Thynne, of Longeleate, in the County of Wilts, Esquire, to settle a Jointure on a Wife, of certain Lands, Tenements, and Hereditaments, therein mentioned.
Winestead Manor Act 1677	29 & 30 Cha. 2. c. 12 Pr.	20 March 1678
An Act for discharging the Manor of Winsteed, in the County of Yorke, from a Settlement in Taille, and charging other. Manors and Lands in the County of Lyncolne, of a greater Value, with the same Uses.
Gery's Estate Act 1677	29 & 30 Cha. 2. c. 13 Pr.	20 March 1678
An Act for the settling of certain Lands belonging to William Gery, of Bushmead, in the County of Bedford, Esquire, upon Trustees, to besold, for the Payment of Debts.
Bedell's Estate Act 1677	29 & 30 Cha. 2. c. 14 Pr.	20 March 1678
An Act for vesting certain Manors and Lands of Edward Bedell, of Woodrising, in the County of Norfolk, Esquire, in certain Trustees, to be sold, for Payment of his Debts, and for raising of Portions for Diana Bedell, Isabella Bedell, and Anne Bedell, Infants, Daughters of the said Edward Bedell, and for such other Children as shall hereafter be begotten by the said Edward Bedell upon the Body of Isabella Bedell, his now Wife.
Brend's Estate Act 1677	29 & 30 Cha. 2. c. 15 Pr.	20 March 1678
An Act to enable Francis Brend Esquire, the surviving Son and Issue Male of Sir Mathew Brend Knight, deceased, to sell certain Lands, for the raising of Three Thousand Pounds, for the Portions of Frances and Elizabeth Brend, the Daughters of Thomas Brend Esquire, deceased, late Elder Brother of the said Francis Brend.
Countess of Lincoln's Naturalization Act 1677	29 & 30 Cha. 2. c. 16 Pr.	13 May 1678
An Act for the naturalizing of Jane de Galiere, Countess of Lyncolne, and others.
Baron Audley of Hely (Restoration of Honour) Act 1677	29 & 30 Cha. 2. c. 17 Pr.	13 May 1678
An Act for restoring the Honour of Baron Audley, of Hely, to James Lord Audley, and others herein mentioned.
Diocese of St Asaph Act 1677	29 & 30 Cha. 2. c. 18 Pr.	13 May 1678
An Act for the appropriating the Rectory of Lanhayader, in Mochuant, in the Counties of Denbigh and Montgomery, and of Skeiviog, in the County of Flint, for Repairs of the Cathedral Church of St. Asaph, and the better Maintenance of the Choir there; and also for the uniting of several Rectories sine Cura and the Vicarages of the same Parishes within the Diocese of St. Asaph (Note: Diocese of St Asaph) aforesaid.
Banks' Estate Act 1677	29 & 30 Cha. 2. c. 19 Pr.	13 May 1678
An Act to enable Trustees of Sir Ralph Banks to sell Lands, for Payment of Debts.
Shalcrosse's Estate Act 1677	29 & 30 Cha. 2. c. 20 Pr.	13 May 1678
An Act for settling divers Manors, Farms, and Lands, in the County of Hertford, now in the Possession of Francis Shalcross Esquire, and for making Provision for Younger Children, and Payment of Debts.
Samine's Estate Act 1677	29 & 30 Cha. 2. c. 21 Pr.	13 May 1678
An Act to enable Trustees to sell Lands, for the raising of Money, to pay the Debts of John Samine Esquire.
Herring's Estate Act 1677	29 & 30 Cha. 2. c. 22 Pr.	13 May 1678
An Act to enable Trustees to sell Lands, for Payment of the Debts of John Herring, deceased.
Thorold's Estate Act 1677	29 & 30 Cha. 2. c. 23 Pr.	13 May 1678
An Act to enable Trustees to sell Lands, for Payment of the Debts of Sir William Thorold, of Hough, in the County of Lyncolne, Knight, deceased.

=== Sources ===
- Raithby, John, ed. (1963) [1819]. "29° & 30° Car. II.". Statutes of the Realm. Vol. 5: The Statutes of King Charles I and King Charles II (1625–1680). London: Dawsons. pp. 852–866 – via HathiTrust.
- Raithby, John, ed. (1819). Statutes of the Realm. Vol. 5: 1628-80 – via British History Online.
- Pickering, Danby, ed. (1763). "Anno vicesimo nono & tricesimo Caroli II". The Statutes at Large. Vol. 8: From the Twelfth Year of King Charles II to the Last Year of King James II. Inclusive. Cambridge: Joseph Bentham. pp. 417–419 – via Internet Archive.
- Journal of the House of Commons. Vol. 9. London: His Majesty's Stationery Office. 1803. pp. 427–480 – via Google Books.
- Chronological Table of and Index to the Statutes. Vol. 1: To the End of the Session 59 Vict. Sess. 2 (1895) (13th ed.). London: Her Majesty's Stationery Office. 1896. p. 73 – via Google Books.
- Chronological Table of the Statutes: Covering the Period from 1235 to the End of 1971. London: Her Majesty's Stationery Office. 1972. p. 71. ISBN 978-0-11-840096-1 – via Google Books.
- "Chronological Tables of the Private and Personal Acts: Part 3 (1660–1680)". legislation.gov.uk. The National Archives.

== See also ==
- List of acts of the Parliament of England
