= 1823 in the United Kingdom =

Events from the year 1823 in the United Kingdom.

== Incumbents ==
- Monarch – George IV
- Prime Minister – Robert Jenkinson, 2nd Earl of Liverpool (Tory)
- Foreign Secretary – George Canning
- Home Secretary – Robert Peel
- Secretary of War – Lord Bathurst

== Events ==
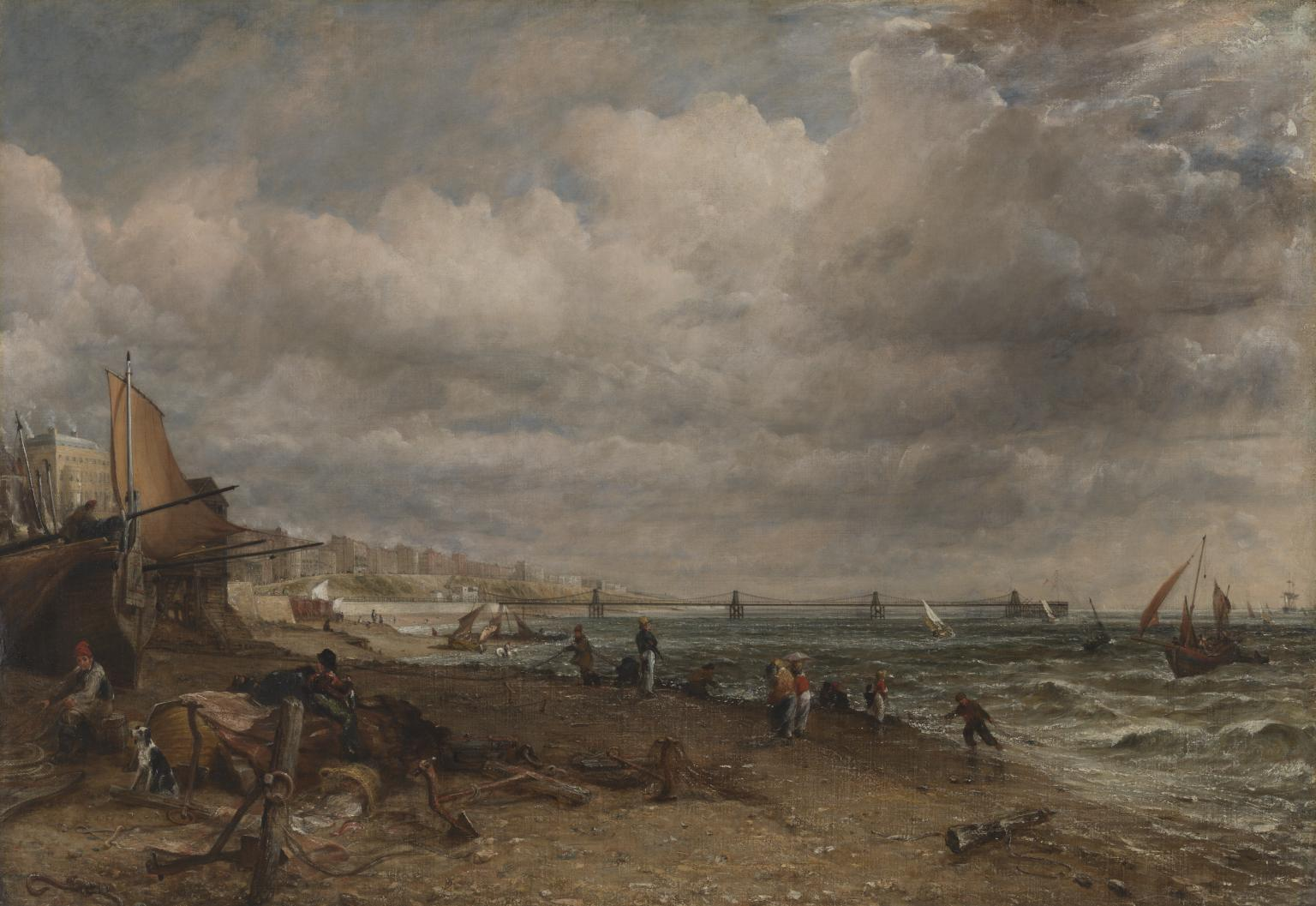
Royal Suspension Chain Pier opens in the resort of Brighton. Chain Pier, Brighton by John Constable.

- January – The King's Library, George III's personal library of 65,000 volumes, 19,000 pamphlets, maps, charts and topographical drawings, is offered to the British Museum.
- 23 January – At Paviland Cave on the Gower Peninsula, William Buckland inspects the "Red Lady of Paviland", the first identification of a prehistoric (male) human burial (although Buckland dates it as Roman).
- 20 February – Explorer James Weddell's expedition to Antarctica reaches latitude 74°15' S and longitude 34°16'45" W, further south than any ship has reached previously.
- March – Royal Academy of Music opens in London.
- 17 June – Charles Macintosh patents the waterproof material later used to make Mackintosh coats.
- July – Robert Peel ensures the passage of five Acts of Parliament, effectively abolishing the death penalty for over one hundred offences, starting to reverse the Bloody Code; in particular, the 4 July Judgement of Death Act allows judges to commute sentences for capital offences other than murder or treason to imprisonment or transportation.
- 4 July – Transportation Act allows convicts transported to the colonies to be employed on public works.
- 10 July – Gaols Act passed by Parliament, begins the process of prison reform based on the campaign of Elizabeth Fry. It provides for payment for gaolers (rather than them recovering their costs from convicts), requires regular reports on prison conditions from justices of the peace and chaplains, and mandates separation of female prisoners.
- 18 July – Excise Act reduces duties on the distillation of whisky, encouraging its commercial production.
- 28 July – The first theatrical adaptation of the Frankenstein story, Presumption; or, the Fate of Frankenstein, opens at the Royal Opera House, Covent Garden in London. On August 29, Mary Shelley attends a performance, the only version of her novel she will ever see.
- 18 August – Demerara rebellion of 1823: In the British colony of Demerara-Essequibo (modern-day Guyana in South America), an insurrection of 10,000 black slaves begins; it is suppressed after three days, but hundreds of suspects are executed in the reprisals that follow.
- 23 September – First Burmese War: Burmese attack the British on Shapura, an island close to Chittagong.
- November – According to tradition, William Webb Ellis invents rugby.
- 3 November – An explosion at the Rainton Colliery Company's Plain Pit mine at Chilton Moor in County Durham kills at least 57 coal miners, six years after an accident at the same pit killed 27.
- 25 November – Opening of The Royal Suspension Chain Pier at Brighton, designed by Captain Samuel Brown, RN, the first pleasure pier on the mainland of England.
- 10 December – Mary Anning finds the first complete Plesiosaurus skeleton, on the Jurassic Coast.

=== Undated ===
- Beginning of the first Anglo-Ashanti war.
- Oxford Union established by University of Oxford students as the Oxford United Debating Society.

== Publications ==
- Thomas Campbell's poem The Last Man.
- Thomas De Quincey's critical essay On the Knocking at the Gate in Macbeth (in The London Magazine, October).
- John Gibson Lockhart's Oxford-set novel Reginald Dalton.
- Mrs Markham's children's A History of England from the First Invasion by the Romans to the End of the Reign of George III.
- Sir Walter Scott's anonymous novels Peveril of the Peak, Quentin Durward and St. Ronan's Well.
- Thomas Wakley's medical journal The Lancet (first published 5 October ).
- The anonymous anthology of German short stories Popular Tales and Romances of the Northern Nations.

== Births ==
- 3 January – Robert Whitehead, marine engineer (died 1905)
- 8 January – Alfred Russel Wallace, naturalist and biologist (died 1913)
- 23 February – John Braxton Hicks, obstetrician (died 1897)
- 19 April – Anna Laetitia Waring, poet (died 1910)
- 2 May – Emma Hardinge Britten, née Floyd, spiritualist (died 1899)
- 17 May – Henry Eckford, horticulturist (died 1905)
- 23 July – Coventry Patmore, poet (died 1896)
- 2 August – Edward Augustus Freeman, historian and politician (died 1892)
- 10 August – Charles Keene, illustrator (died 1891)
- 11 August – Charlotte Mary Yonge, novelist (died 1901)
- 13 August – Goldwin Smith, historian (died 1910)
- 3 September – Hardinge Giffard, 1st Earl of Halsbury, lawyer, Lord Chancellor (died 1921)
- 26 October – Sir Frederick Peel, politician (died 1906)
- 24 December – William Brighty Rands, writer, author of nursery rhymes (died 1882)
- 28 December – Augusta Theodosia Drane, religious writer and Catholic prioress (died 1894)

== Deaths ==
- 22 January – John Julius Angerstein, merchant, insurer and art collector (born 1735 in Russia)
- 26 January – Edward Jenner, physician and pioneer of vaccination (born 1749)
- 27 January – Charles Hutton, mathematician (born 1737)
- 7 February – Mrs Radcliffe, writer (born 1764)
- 26 February – John Philip Kemble, actor (born 1757)
- 14 March – John Jervis, 1st Earl of St Vincent, Royal Navy admiral (born 1735)
- 23 April – Joseph Nollekens, sculptor (born 1737)
- 19 June – William Combe, writer, poet and adventurer (born 1742)
- 8 July – Sir Henry Raeburn, Scottish portrait painter (born 1756)
- 11 September – David Ricardo, economist (born 1772)
- 23 September – Matthew Baillie, Scottish-born physician and pathologist (born 1761)
- 30 October – Edmund Cartwright, clergyman and inventor of the power loom (born 1743)
