= Murder Act 1751 =

Act of the Parliament of Great Britain

Murder Act 1751 (Note: The citation of this act by this short title was authorised by section 1 of, and the first schedule to, the Short Titles Act 1896. Due to the repeal of those provisions it is now authorised by section 19(2) of the Interpretation Act 1978. Some sources refer to the act as the Murder Act 1752, this being the year in which it was passed.)
- Act of Parliament
- Parliament of Great Britain
- Long title: An Act for better preventing the horrid Crime of Murder.
- Citation: 25 Geo. 2. c. 37
- Territorial extent: Great Britain

Dates
- Royal assent: 26 March 1752
- Commencement: April 1752 (Note: Section 1. Start of Easter term.)
- Repealed: 18 July 1973
Other legislation
Amended by	Offences Against the Person Act 1828; Criminal Law (India) Act 1828; Punishment of Offences Act 1837; Murder (Abolition of Death Penalty) Act 1965; Statute Law Revision Act 1867; Statute Law Revision Act 1888; Criminal Law Act 1967
Repealed by	Statute Law (Repeals) Act 1973

Status: Repealed

Text of statute as originally enacted

The Murder Act 1751 (25 Geo. 2. c. 37), sometimes referred to as the Murder Act 1752, was an act of the Parliament of Great Britain.

== Provisions ==
The act included the provision "for better preventing the horrid crime of murder" "that some further terror and peculiar mark of infamy be added to the punishment", and that "in no case whatsoever shall the body of any murderer be suffered to be buried", by mandating either public dissection or "hanging in chains" of the cadaver. The act also stipulated that a person found guilty of murder should be executed two days after being sentenced unless that day was a Sunday, in which case the execution would take place on the following Monday.

Section 9 of the act provided that any person who, by force, set at liberty or rescued, or who attempted to set at liberty or rescue, any person out of prison who was committed for, or convicted of, murder, or who rescued or attempted to rescue, any person convicted of murder, going to execution or during execution, was guilty of felony, and was to suffer death without benefit of clergy.

== Subsequent developments ==
A near-identical act, the Prisoners (Rescue) Act 1791, was passed by the Parliament of Ireland forty years later, and it applied in all of Ireland.

On 1 July 1828, the whole act was repealed for England and Wales, by section 1 of the Offences Against the Person Act 1828 (9 Geo. 4. c. 31), except so far as it related to rescues and attempts to rescue. The corresponding marginal note to that section says that effect of this was to repeal the whole act, except for sections 9 and 10.

The punishment of the death penalty under section 9 of the act was reduced to transportation for life by the Punishment of Offences Act 1837 (7 Will. 4 & 1 Vict. c. 91).

Sections 1 and 11 of the act were repealed by section 1 of, and the schedule to, the Statute Law Revision Act 1871 (34 & 35 Vict. c. 116), which came into force on 21 August 1871.

Section 9 of the act was repealed for England and Wales by section 10(2) of, and part I of schedule 3 to, the Criminal Law Act 1967, which came into force on 1 January 1968.

The whole act was repealed by section 1(1) of, and part V of schedule 1 to, the Statute Law (Repeals) Act 1973, which came into force on 18 July 1973.

== See also ==
- Murder in English law
- Scots law on murder
