= Punishment of Offences Act 1837 =

Act of the Parliament of the United Kingdom

Punishment of Offences Act 1837 (Note: The citation of this act by this short title was authorised by section 1 of, and the first schedule to, the Short Titles Act 1896. Due to the repeal of those provisions it is now authorised by section 19(2) of the Interpretation Act 1978.)
- Act of Parliament
- Parliament of the United Kingdom
- Long title: An Act for abolishing the Punishment of Death in certain Cases.
- Citation: 7 Will. 4 & 1 Vict. c. 91
- Introduced by: Lord John Russell MP (Commons); Thomas Aitchison-Denman, 2nd Baron Denman (Lords)
- Territorial extent: United Kingdom

Dates
- Royal assent: 17 July 1837
- Commencement: 1 October 1837 (Note: Section 5.)
- Repealed: 21 July 2008
Other legislation
Amends	Riot Act; Murder Act 1751; Prisoners (Rescue) Act 1791; Incitement to Mutiny Act 1797; Incitement to Disaffection Act (Ireland) 1797; Unlawful Oaths Act 1812; Slave Trade Act 1824
Repeals/revokes	Plague Act 1603
Amended by	Statute Law Revision Act 1874; Statute Law Revision (No. 2) Act 1890; Statute Law Revision Act 1892; Statute Law Revision (No. 2) Act 1893; Penal Servitude Act 1857; Criminal Justice Act 1948; Criminal Law Act 1967
Repealed by	Statute Law (Repeals) Act 2008
Relates to	Prisons Act 1835; Gaols Act 1823; Forgery Act 1837; Offences Against the Person Act 1837

Status: Repealed

History of passage through Parliament

Records of Parliamentary debate relating to the statute from Hansard

Text of statute as originally enacted

Revised text of statute as amended

The Punishment of Offences Act 1837 (7 Will. 4 & 1 Vict. c. 91) was an act of the Parliament of the United Kingdom that abolished the death penalty for a number of statutory offences and replaced it with transportation for life.

The act was one of the Acts for the Mitigation of the Criminal Law (7 Will. 4 & 1 Vict. cc. 84–91), which reduced the severity of punishments in the criminal justice system and abolished the death penalty for several offences.

== Background ==
In 1837, bills were introduced by the home secretary, Lord John Russell, to reduce the severity of punishments in the criminal justice system and abolish the death penalty for several offences:

- Forgery
- Offences against the person
- Burglary
- Robbery
- Piracy
- Arson
- Solitary confinement
- Death penalty

== Passage ==
Leave to bring in the Punishment of Death Bill was granted to Lord John Russell MP, the attorney general, John Campbell MP and the solicitor general, Robert Rolfe MP, on 23 March 1837. The bill had its first reading in the House of Commons on 10 April 1837, introduced by Lord John Russell MP as part of a wider package of acts to reduce the severity of punishment in the criminal justice system. The bill had its second reading in the House of Commons on 24 April 1837 and was committed to a Committee of the Whole House. The committee met on 19 May 1837, during which an amendment moved by William Ewart MP to abolish the death penalty in all cases except murder was narrowly defeated by one vote (73 to 72). The committee reported on 30 May 1837, with amendments. The amended bill was considered by the House of commons on 27 June 1837 and was re-committed to a committee of the whole house, which met on 27 June 1837 and 3 July 1837 and reported on 4 July 1837, with amendments. The amended bill had its third reading in the House of Commons on 5 July 1837, without amendments.

The bill had its first reading in the House of Lords on 5 July 1837. The bill had its second reading in the House of Lords on 7 July 1837 and was committed to a committee of the whole house, introduced by Thomas Aitchison-Denman, 2nd Baron Denman. The measures in the bill to reduce capital punishment was supported by Henry Brougham, 1st Baron Brougham and Vaux, but the rushed timeline of the bill was criticised. The committee which met on 11 July 1837, during which am amendment by William Best, 1st Baron Wynford to delay the passing of the bill by 3-months was rejected. The committee reported on 12 July 1837, with amendments. The amended bill had its third reading in the House of Lords on 13 July 1837, with amendments, and passed on 14 July 1837, with amendments.

The amended bill was considered and agreed to by the House of Commons on 15 July 1837.

The bill was granted royal assent on 17 July 1837.

== Provisions ==
The preamble specified the following offences:

- offences under sections 1 and 4 and 5 of the Riot Act (1 Geo. 1. St. 2. c. 5)
- offences under section 9 of the Murder Act 1751 (25 Geo. 2. c. 37)
- offences under section 10 of the Prisoners (Rescue) Act 1791 (31 Geo. 3. c. 17 (I))
- offences under section 1 of the Incitement to Mutiny Act 1797 (37 Geo. 3. c. 70)
- offences under section 1 of the Incitement to Disaffection Act (Ireland) 1797 (37 Geo. 3. c. 40 (I))
- offences under section 1 and 4 of the Unlawful Oaths Act 1812 (52 Geo. 3. c. 104)
- offences under section 9 of the Slave Trade Act 1824 (5 Geo. 4. c. 113)

Section 1 of the act provided that:

If any person shall . . . be convicted of any of the offences herein-before mentioned, such person shall not suffer death or have sentence of death awarded against him or her for the same, but shall be liable . . . to be transported beyond the seas for the term of the natural life of such person . . .

Section 2 of the act permitted the punishment for the offences mentioned of imprisonment with or without hard labour and solitary confinement up to 1-month at a time totalling no more than 3-months in a year.

Section 3 of the act provided that nothing in the act would affect powers under the Prisons Act 1835 (5 & 6 Will. 4. c. 38) or the Gaols Act 1823 (4 Geo. 4. c. 64).

Section 4 of the act repealed the Plague Act 1603 (1 Jas. 1. c. 31) and "any act perpetuating the same".

Section 5 of the act provided that the act would come into force on 1 October 1837.

== Legacy ==
=== Subsequent developments ===
The act was one of the Acts for the Mitigation of the Criminal Law (7 Will. 4 & 1 Vict. cc. 84–91), which reduced the severity of punishments in the criminal justice system and abolished the death penalty for several offences:

- Forgery Act 1837 (7 Will. 4 & 1 Vict. c. 84)
- Offences Against the Person Act 1837 (7 Will. 4 & 1 Vict. c. 85)
- Burglary Act 1837 (7 Will. 4 & 1 Vict. c. 86)
- Robbery from the Person Act 1837 (7 Will. 4 & 1 Vict. c. 87)
- Piracy Act 1837 (7 Will. 4 & 1 Vict. c. 88)
- Burning of Buildings, etc. Act 1837 (7 Will. 4 & 1 Vict. c. 89)
- Solitary Confinement Act 1837 (7 Will. 4 & 1 Vict. c. 90)
- Punishment of Offences Act 1837 (7 Will. 4 & 1 Vict. c. 91)

=== Criticism ===
The broad terms of the repeal mentioned in section 4 of the act was criticised in by Thomas Chisholm Anstey, a member of the Board for the Revision of the Statute Law.

=== Amendments ===
The penalty was reduced to penal servitude for life by section 2 of the Penal Servitude Act 1857 (20 & 21 Vict. c. 3), and to imprisonment for life by section 1(1) of the Criminal Justice Act 1948 (11 & 12 Geo. 6. c. 58), of the Criminal Justice (Scotland) Act 1949 (11 & 12 Geo. 6. c. 94), and of the Criminal Justice Act (Northern Ireland) 1953 (c. 14) (N.I.). Section 1(1) of the 1949 act was replaced by section 221(1) of the Criminal Procedure (Scotland) Act 1975 (c. 21).

Sections 4 and 5 of the act were repealed by section 1 of, and the schedule to, the Statute Law Revision Act 1874 (37 & 38 Vict. c. 35), which came into force on 16 July 1874.

The words "after the commencement of this Act" in section 1 of the act, and section 3 of the act, were repealed by section 1 of, and part I of the first schedule to, the Statute Law Revision (No. 2) Act 1890 (53 & 54 Vict. c. 51), which came into force on 18 August 1890.

The words "at the discretion of the court" and "or for any Term not less than fifteen years, or to be imprisoned for any term not exceeding three years" in section 1 of the act were repealed by section 1 of, and the schedule to, the Statute Law Revision Act 1892 (55 & 56 Vict. c. 19), which came into force on 20 June 1892.

Section 2 of the act was repealed by section 1 of, and the first schedule to, the Statute Law Revision (No. 2) Act 1893 (56 & 57 Vict. c. 54), which came into force on 22 September 1893.

The preamble to, and section 1 of, as it related to offences under the Riot Act (1 Geo. 1. St. 2. c. 5), the Murder Act 1751 (25 Geo. 2. c. 37) and section 4 of the Unlawful Oaths Act 1812 (52 Geo. 3. c. 104), the Act was repealed in England and Wales by section 10(2) of, and part III of schedule 3 to, the Criminal Law Act 1967, which came into force on 1 January 1968.

Section 1 of the act was repealed for Northern Ireland by section 15 of, and Schedule 2 to, the Criminal Law Act (Northern Ireland) 1967 (c. 18 (N.I.)).

The act was retained for the Republic of Ireland by section 2(2)(a) of, and part 4 of schedule 1 to, the Statute Law Revision Act 2007, which came into force on 8 May 2007.

The whole act was repealed for New Zealand by section 412(1) of, and the fourth schedule to, the Crimes Act 1961.
