= Incitement to Disaffection Act (Ireland) 1797 =

- Act of Parliament
- Parliament of Ireland
- Long title: An Act for the better Prevention and Punishment of Attempts to seduce Persons serving in His Majesty's Forces by Sea or Land from their Duty and Allegiance to His Majesty, or to incite them to Mutiny or Disobedience.
- Citation: 37 Geo. 3. c. 40 (I)
- Territorial extent: Ireland

Dates
- Royal assent: 3 July 1797
- Commencement: 3 July 1797 (Note: The Acts of Parliament (Commencement) Act (Ireland) 1795.)
- Repealed: 19 November 1998

Other legislation
- Amended by: Punishment of Offences Act 1837; Penal Servitude Act 1857; Statute Law Revision (Ireland) Act 1879; Criminal Justice Act (Northern Ireland) 1953
- Repealed by: Statute Law (Repeals) Act 1998
- Relates to: Punishment of Offences Act 1837; Incitement to Mutiny Act 1797

Status: Repealed

Text of statute as originally enacted

The Incitement to Disaffection Act (Ireland) 1797 (37 Geo. 3. c. 40 (I)) was an act of the Parliament of the Kingdom of Ireland. It made equivalent provision to the Incitement to Mutiny Act 1797 (37 Geo. 3. c. 70) for Ireland.

== Subsequent developments ==
The death penalty for the offence under the act of maliciously and advisedly endeavouring to seduce any person or persons serving in His Majesty's Forces by sea or land from his or their duty and allegiance to His Majesty, or inciting or stirring up any such person or persons to commit any act of mutiny, or to make or endeavour to make any mutinous assembly, or to commit any traitorous or mutinous practice whatsoever, was reduced to transportation for life by section 1 of the Punishment of Offences Act 1837 (7 Will. 4 & 1 Vict. c. 91). It was reduced again to penal servitude for life by section 2 of the Penal Servitude Act 1857 (20 & 21 Vict. c. 3), and to imprisonment for life by section 1(1) of the Criminal Justice Act (Northern Ireland) 1953 (c. 14 (N.I.)).

The whole act was repealed for Northern Ireland by section 1(1) of, and group 2 of part I of schedule 1 to, the Statute Law (Repeals) Act 1998, which came into force on 19 November 1998.

This act was repealed for the Republic of Ireland by section 1 of, and the schedule to, the Statute Law Revision (Pre-Union Irish Statutes) Act 1962, which came into force on 24 November 1962.

== See also ==
- Mutiny Acts
- Incitement to Disaffection Act 1934
