= Incitement to Mutiny Act 1797 =

Act of the Parliament of Great Britain

Incitement to Mutiny Act 1797 (Note: The citation of this act by this short title was authorised by section 1 of, and the first schedule to, the Short Titles Act 1896 (59 & 60 Vict. c. 14). Due to the repeal of those provisions, it is now authorised by section 19(2) of the Interpretation Act 1978.)
- Act of Parliament
- Parliament of Great Britain
- Long title: An Act for the better Prevention and Punishment of Attempts to seduce Persons serving in His Majesty’s Forces by Sea or Land from their Duty and Allegiance to His Majesty, or to incite them to Mutiny or Disobedience.
- Citation: 37 Geo. 3. c. 70
- Territorial extent: Great Britain

Dates
- Royal assent: 6 June 1797
- Commencement: 6 June 1797 (Note: The Acts of Parliament (Commencement) Act 1793.)
- Repealed: 19 November 1998
Other legislation
Amended by	Continuance of Laws Act 1799; Statute Law Revision Act 1871; Statute Law Revision Act 1888; Air Force (Application of Enactments) (No 2) Order 1918; Criminal Justice Act 1948; Criminal Justice (Scotland) Act 1949; Criminal Law Act 1967; Criminal Law Act (Northern Ireland) 1967
Repealed by	Statute Law (Repeals) Act 1998
Relates to	Certain Mutinous Crews Act 1797; Incitement to Disaffection Act (Ireland) 1797; Punishment of Offences Act 1837

Status: Repealed

Text of statute as originally enacted

Revised text of statute as amended

Allegiance of Sea and Land Forces Act 1817
- Act of Parliament
- Parliament of the United Kingdom
- Long title: An Act to revive and make perpetual Two Acts of the Thirty-seventh Year of His present Majesty, the one in the Parliament of Great Britain, and the other in the Parliament of Ireland, for the better Prevention and Punishment of Attempts to seduce Persons serving in His Majesty's Forces by Sea or Land from their Duty and Allegiance to His Majesty, or to incite them to Mutiny or Disobedience.
- Citation: 57 Geo. 3. c. 7
- Territorial extent: United Kingdom

Dates
- Royal assent: 17 March 1817
- Commencement: 17 March 1817
- Repealed: 5 August 1873
Other legislation
Amends	Incitement to Mutiny Act 1797; Incitement to Disaffection Act (Ireland) 1797
Repealed by	Statute Law Revision Act 1873

Status: Repealed

Text of statute as originally enacted

The Incitement to Mutiny Act 1797 (37 Geo. 3. c. 70) was an act of the Parliament of Great Britain. The act was passed in the aftermath of the Spithead and Nore mutinies and aimed to prevent the seduction of sailors and soldiers to commit mutiny.

The act was revived and made perpetual by the Allegiance of Sea and Land Forces Act 1817 (57 Geo. 3. c. 7).

The Parliament of Ireland passed an equivalent act in the same year: the Incitement to Disaffection Act (Ireland) 1797 (37 Geo. 3. c. 40 (I)).

== Provisions ==
=== Section 1 – Any person who shall attempt to seduce any sailor or soldier from his duty or incite him to mutiny, etc to suffer death ===
Section 1 of the act provided:

Any person who shall maliciously and advisedly endeavour to seduce any person or persons serving in His Majesty's forces, by sea or land, from his or their duty and allegiance to His Majesty, or incite or stir up any such person or persons to commit any act of mutiny, or to make, or endeavour to make, any mutinous assembly, or to commit any traitorous or mutinous practice whatsoever, shall on being legally convicted of such offence, be adjudged guilty of felony ...

The words at the end were repealed by the Statute Law Revision Act 1888 (51 & 52 Vict. c. 3).

The reference to felony was construed as a reference to "an offence" following the Criminal Law Act 1967 and the Criminal Law Act (Northern Ireland) 1967.

The offence was extended to members of the Royal Air Force by the Air Force (Application of Enactments) (No 2) Order 1918 (S.R. & O. 1918/548).

The death penalty for the offence under section 1 was reduced to transportation for life by section 1 of the Punishment of Offences Act 1837 (7 Will. 4 & 1 Vict. c. 91). It was reduced again to penal servitude for life by section 2 of the Penal Servitude Act 1857 (20 & 21 Vict. c. 3), and to imprisonment for life by section 1(1) of the Criminal Justice Act 1948 (11 & 12 Geo. 6. c. 58) and of the Criminal Justice (Scotland) Act 1949 (12, 13 & 14 Geo. 6. c. 94).

=== Section 3 – Persons tried for offences against this Act not to be tried again for the same, as high treason, or misprision of high treason, etc ===
Section 3 of the act read:

Provided always, that any person who shall be tried and acquitted or convicted of any offence against this Act shall not be liable to be indicted, prosecuted or tried again for the same offence or fact as high treason or misprision of high treason; and that nothing in this Act contained shall be construed to extend to prevent any persons guilty of any offence against this Act, and who shall not be tried for the same as an offence against this Act, from being tried for the same as high treason or misprision of high treason, in such manner as if this Act had not been made.

== Subsequent developments ==
Section 4 of the act was repealed by section 1 of, and the schedule to, the Statute Law Revision Act 1871 (34 & 35 Vict. c. 116), which came into force on 21 August 1871.

Section 2 of the act was repealed for England and Wales by section 10(2) of, and part III of schedule 3 to, the Criminal Law Act 1967, which came into force on 1 January 1968.

The whole act was repealed by section 1(1) of, and group 2 of part I of schedule 1 to, the Statute Law (Repeals) Act 1998, which came into force on 19 November 1998.

== See also ==
- Mutiny Acts
- Incitement to Disaffection Act 1934
