= Statute Law (Repeals) Act 1998 =

Act of the Parliament of the United Kingdom

Statute Law (Repeals) Act 1998 (Note: Section 3.)
- Act of Parliament
- Parliament of the United Kingdom
- Long title: An Act to promote the reform of the statute law by the repeal, in accordance with recommendations of the Law Commission and the Scottish Law Commission, of certain enactments which (except in so far as their effect is preserved) are no longer of practical utility, and to make other provision in connection with the repeal of those enactments.
- Citation: 1998 c. 43
- Territorial extent: United Kingdom; Isle of Man; (Note: Section 2.)

Dates
- Royal assent: 19 November 1998
- Commencement: 19 November 1998 (Note: Section 4(b) of the Interpretation Act 1978.)
Other legislation
Amends	Slave Trade Act 1824; Metropolitan Police Act 1839; Public Schools Act 1868; Slave Trade Act 1873; Colonial Stock Act 1877; Colonial Stock Act 1892; Sea Fisheries Act 1883; Fisheries Act 1891; Finance Act 1931; Science and Technology Act 1965; Road Traffic Regulation Act 1984; Clean Air Act 1993; See § Repealed enactments
Repeals/revokes	See § Repealed enactments
Amended by	Courts Act 2003; Deregulation Act 2015
Relates to	See Statute Law (Repeals) Act

Status: Amended

Text of statute as originally enacted

Revised text of statute as amended

The Statute Law (Repeals) Act 1998 (c. 43) is an act of the Parliament of the United Kingdom. It provided reform to the statute law in the areas of administration of justice, ecclesiastical law, education, finance, Hereford and Worcester, inclosure acts, Scottish Local Acts, Slave Trade Acts, as well as other miscellaneous items.

== Background ==
The act implemented recommendations contained in the sixteenth report on statute law revision, by the Law Commission and the Scottish Law Commission.

== Provisions ==
=== Repealed enactments ===
Section 1(1) of the act repealed 359 enactments and revoked 39 instruments, listed in parts I to X of schedule 1 to the act.

==== Part I: Administration of Justice ====
Administration of Justice
Citation	Short title	Extent of repeal
Group 1 – Sheriffs
50 & 51 Vict. c. 55	Sheriffs Act 1887	In section 6(1), the words "the Lord High Treasurer, or if there is no Lord High Treasurer,".
50 & 51 Vict. c. 55	Sheriffs Act 1887	Section 11.
50 & 51 Vict. c. 55	Sheriffs Act 1887	Section 16(2).
50 & 51 Vict. c. 55	Sheriffs Act 1887	Section 20(1).
50 & 51 Vict. c. 55	Sheriffs Act 1887	In section 20(3), the words "or is given to an officer of the sheriff by the sheriff,".
50 & 51 Vict. c. 55	Sheriffs Act 1887	Section 20(4).
50 & 51 Vict. c. 55	Sheriffs Act 1887	Section 21.
50 & 51 Vict. c. 55	Sheriffs Act 1887	Section 22.
50 & 51 Vict. c. 55	Sheriffs Act 1887	Section 23(2).
50 & 51 Vict. c. 55	Sheriffs Act 1887	In section 27(1) the words "let, or take to ferm".
50 & 51 Vict. c. 55	Sheriffs Act 1887	Section 28.
50 & 51 Vict. c. 55	Sheriffs Act 1887	In section 29(1) the words, "(c) lets go at large a prisoner who is not bailable; or".
50 & 51 Vict. c. 55	Sheriffs Act 1887	In section 29(2) the words, "(a) withholds a prisoner bailable after he has offered sufficient security; or".
50 & 51 Vict. c. 55	Sheriffs Act 1887	Section 30(2).
50 & 51 Vict. c. 55	Sheriffs Act 1887	Section 31.
50 & 51 Vict. c. 55	Sheriffs Act 1887	In section 33(4) the words "and save as regards the maintenance of men servants and the duration of office,".
50 & 51 Vict. c. 55	Sheriffs Act 1887	Section 39 except paragraph (formerly proviso) (1)(c) and (d).
50 & 51 Vict. c. 55	Sheriffs Act 1887	Section 40(2).
Group 2 – General Repeals
37 Geo. 3. c. 70	Incitement to Mutiny Act 1797	The whole act.
37 Geo. 3. c. 40 (I)	Incitement to Disaffection Act (Ireland) 1797	The whole act.
7 Geo. 4. c. 64	Criminal Law Act 1826	In section 28, the proviso.
7 Geo. 4. c. 64	Criminal Law Act 1826	In section 29, the words ", upon being paid for the same the sum of 25p and no more".
2 & 3 Vict. c. 47	Metropolitan Police Act 1839	In section 76, the words from "on" onwards.
3 & 4 Vict. c. 84	Metropolitan Police Courts Act 1840	Section 6.
10 & 11 Eliz. 2. c. 30	Northern Ireland Act 1962	Section 25.
10 & 11 Eliz. 2. c. 30	Northern Ireland Act 1962	Schedule 2.
1967 c. 18 (N.I.)	Criminal Law Act (Northern Ireland) 1967	In Schedule 1, paragraph 4.
1984 c. 27	Road Traffic Regulation Act 1984	Schedule 12.
1992 c. 53	Tribunals and Inquiries Act 1992	In Schedule 2, paragraph 5.

==== Part II: Ecclesiastical Law ====
Ecclesiastical Law
Citation	Short title	Extent of repeal
Group 1 – Ecclesiastical Leases
13 Eliz. 1. c. 10	Ecclesiastical Leases Act 1571	The whole act.
14 Eliz. 1. c. 11	Ecclesiastical Leases Act 1572	The whole act.
18 Eliz. 1. c. 11	Ecclesiastical Leases Act 1575	The whole act.
39 & 40 Geo. 3. c. 41	Ecclesiastical Leases Act 1800	The whole act.
1964 c. 51	Universities and College Estates Act 1964	In section 1(1), from the beginning to "and".
Group 2 – Tithes
6 & 7 Will. 4. c. 71	Tithe Act 1836	The whole act except sections 12, 64 and 96.
1 & 2 Vict. c. 64	Tithe Act 1838	The whole act.
2 & 3 Vict. c. 62	Tithe Act 1839	The whole act except sections 1 and 37.
3 & 4 Vict. c. 15	Tithe Act 1840	The whole act.
5 & 6 Vict. c. 54	Tithe Act 1842	The whole act.
9 & 10 Vict. c. 73	Tithe Act 1846	The whole act.
10 & 11 Vict. c. 104	Tithe Act 1847	The whole act.
23 & 24 Vict. c. 93	Tithe Act 1860	The whole act except section 24.
41 & 42 Vict. c. 42	Tithe Act 1878	The whole act.
48 & 49 Vict. c. 32	Tithe Rentcharge Redemption Act 1885	The whole act.
8 & 9 Geo. 5. c. 54	Tithe Act 1918	The whole act.
15 & 16 Geo. 5. c. 18	Settled Land Act 1925	Section 73(1)(xvi).
15 & 16 Geo. 5. c. 24	Universities and College Estates Act 1925	Section 26(1)(xiv).
15 & 16 Geo. 5. c. 87	Tithe Act 1925	The whole act.
18 & 19 Geo. 5 No. 2	Tithe (Administration of Trusts) Measure 1928	The whole measure.
26 Geo. 5 & 1 Edw. 8. c. 43	Tithe Act 1936	Section 30 and Schedule 6.
1963 c. 14	Corn Rents Act 1963	Section 2.

==== Part III: Education ====
Education
Citation	Short title	Extent of repeal
Group 1 – Public Schools
31 & 32 Vict. c. 118	Public Schools Act 1868	In section 5, the words "shall be a body corporate, with perpetual succession and a common seal, and".
32 & 33 Vict. c. 58	Public Schools Act 1869	The whole act.
34 & 35 Vict. c. 60	Public Schools Act 1871	The whole act.
36 & 37 Vict. c. 41	Public Schools (Shrewsbury and Harrow Schools Property) Act 1873	The whole act.
Group 2 – Universities
24 & 25 Vict. c. 82	Durham University Act 1861	The whole act.
40 & 41 Vict. c. 48	Universities of Oxford and Cambridge Act 1877	Sections 52 to 55.
51 & 52 Vict. c. 45	Victoria University Act 1888	The whole act.
2 Edw. 7. c. 14	University of Wales Act 1902	The whole act.
4 Edw. 7. c. 11	University of Liverpool Act 1904	The whole act.
4 Edw. 7. c. 12	Leeds University Act 1904	The whole act.
9 Edw. 7. c. xlii	University of Bristol Act 1909	Section 9.
4 & 5 Geo. 5. c. 4	Sheffield University Act 1914	The whole act.
13 & 14 Geo. 5. c. 33	Universities of Oxford and Cambridge Act 1923	In section 7(1), the words "After the cesser of the powers of the Commissioners,".
13 & 14 Geo. 5. c. 33	Universities of Oxford and Cambridge Act 1923	In section 7(2), the words "After the cesser of the powers of the Commissioners,".
13 & 14 Geo. 5. c. 33	Universities of Oxford and Cambridge Act 1923	In section 7(3), the words "other than the section numbered thirty-five therein".
13 & 14 Geo. 5. c. 33	Universities of Oxford and Cambridge Act 1923	In section 8(2), the words ", whether by the Commissioners or".
13 & 14 Geo. 5. c. 33	Universities of Oxford and Cambridge Act 1923	In the Schedule, paragraphs 6 to 11, 33, 35 and 56.
16 & 17 Geo. 5. c. lxxxiv	University of Reading Act 1926	Section 7.
12, 13 & 14 Geo. 6. c. xi	University of Nottingham Act 1949	Section 7.
1 & 2 Eliz. 2. c. iv	University of Southampton Act 1953	Section 7.

==== Part IV: Finance ====
Finance
Citation	Short title	Extent of repeal
Group 1 – Colonial Stock
40 & 41 Vict. c. 59	Colonial Stock Act 1877	The whole act.
54 & 55 Vict. c. 43	Forged Transfers Act 1891	Section 5.
55 & 56 Vict. c. 35	Colonial Stock Act 1892	The whole act.
20 & 21 Geo. 5. c. 5	Colonial Development Act 1929	The whole act.
2 & 3 Geo. 6. c. 100	Government and other Stocks (Emergency Provisions) Act 1939	In section 1(1), the words "in a register kept in Great Britain under the Colonial Stock Act 1877,".
2 & 3 Geo. 6. c. 100	Government and other Stocks (Emergency Provisions) Act 1939	In section 1(2), the words "the registrar under the Colonial Stock Act 1877,".
2 & 3 Geo. 6. c. 100	Government and other Stocks (Emergency Provisions) Act 1939	In section 1(4), the words "the registrar under the Colonial Stock Act 1877,".
12, 13 & 14 Geo. 6. c. 1	Colonial Stock Act 1948	The whole act.
SI 1953/1199	Federation of Rhodesia and Nyasaland (Constitution) Order in Council 1953	Section 13(2)(f).
8 & 9 Eliz. 2. c. 41	Ghana (Consequential Provision) Act 1960	Section 1(3).
SI 1960/969	Ghana (Consequential Provision) (Colonial Stock Acts) Order in Council 1960	The whole order.
8 & 9 Eliz. 2. c. 52	Cyprus Act 1960	In the Schedule, paragraph 9.
SI 1963/2085	Federation of Rhodesia and Nyasaland (Dissolution) Order in Council 1963	Section 16(8).
1973 c. 27	Bahamas Independence Act 1973	In Schedule 2, paragraph 9.
1978 c. 15	Solomon Islands Act 1978	In the Schedule, paragraph 7.
1978 c. 20	Tuvalu Act 1978	In Schedule 2, paragraph 7.
1979 c. 27	Kiribati Act 1979	In the Schedule, paragraph 8.
1980 c. 2	Papua New Guinea, Western Samoa and Nauru (Miscellaneous Provisions) Act 1980	In the Schedule, paragraph 2.
SI 1980/701	Zimbabwe (Independence and Membership of the Commonwealth) (Consequential Provisions) Order 1980	Article 5.
1981 c. 52	Belize Act 1981	In Schedule 2, paragraph 7.
1982 c. 41	Stock Transfer Act 1982	In Schedule 2, paragraph 6.
1983 c. 20	Mental Health Act 1983	In Schedule 3, the reference to the Colonial Stock Act 1877.
Group 2 – Land Commission
21 & 22 Geo. 5. c. 28	Finance Act 1931	Section 28(6).
1967 c. 1	Land Commission Act 1967	The whole act.
1967 c. 86	Countryside (Scotland) Act 1967	Section 72.
1967 c. 88	Leasehold Reform Act 1967	Section 24(2).
1968 c. 13	National Loans Act 1968	In Schedule 1, the entry relating to the Land Commission Act 1967.
1968 c. 44	Finance Act 1968	Section 40.
1969 c. 32	Finance Act 1969	Sections 43 to 49.
1969 c. 48	Post Office Act 1969	In Schedule 4, in Part II, paragraphs 84, 93(1)(xxvi), 93(3) and 93(4)(f).
1969 c. 48	Post Office Act 1969	In Schedule 9, paragraph 27(10).
1971 c. 18	Land Commission (Dissolution) Act 1971	The whole act.
1988 c. 50	Housing Act 1988	In Schedule 17, in Part II, paragraph 91.
1990 c. 11	Planning (Consequential Provisions) Act 1990	In Schedule 2, paragraph 1.
1994 c. 21	Coal Industry Act 1994	Section 68(2)(d)(iii).
1994 c. 21	Coal Industry Act 1994	In Schedule 9, paragraph 11.
1994 c. 36	Law of Property (Miscellaneous Provisions) Act 1994	In Schedule 1, paragraph 4.
1995 c. 25	Environment Act 1995	In Schedule 10, paragraph 1.
1997 c. 11	Planning (Consequential Provisions) (Scotland) Act 1997	In Schedule 2, paragraphs 1 and 12.
Group 3 – Development of Tourism
1969 c. 51	Development of Tourism Act 1969	Part II.
1969 c. 51	Development of Tourism Act 1969	In section 19(2), the words "and to the provisions of Part II" and the words "or that Part" wherever they occur.
1969 c. 51	Development of Tourism Act 1969	Schedules 3 and 4.
1973 c. 65	Local Government (Scotland) Act 1973	In Part II of Schedule 27, paragraph 194.
1982 c. 52	Industrial Development Act 1982	In Part II of Schedule 2, paragraph 5.
1985 c. 9	Companies Consolidation (Consequential Provisions) Act 1985	In Schedule 2, the entry relating to the Development of Tourism Act 1969.
SI 1990/776	Local Government Finance (Repeals, Savings and Consequential Amendments) Order 1990	In Part I of Schedule 3, paragraph 13.
1992 c. 14	Local Government Finance Act 1992	In Schedule 13, paragraph 29.
Group 4 – Loan Societies
3 & 4 Vict. c. 110	Loan Societies Act 1840	The whole act.
1965 c. 32	Administration of Estates (Small Payments) Act 1965	In Part I of Schedule 1, the entry relating to the Loan Societies Act 1840.
1965 c. 32	Administration of Estates (Small Payments) Act 1965	In Schedule 3, the entry relating to the Loan Societies Act 1840.
1985 c. 51	Local Government Act 1985	In Schedule 8, the entry relating to the Loan Societies Act 1840.
Group 5 – General Repeals
42 & 43 Vict. c. 58	Public Offices Fees Act 1879	Section 8(2).
1965 c. 74	Superannuation Act 1965	In section 38(2)(a) and (b), the words "or of the Isle of Man".
1977 c. 3	Aircraft and Shipbuilding Industries Act 1977	Section 3(5).
1995 c. 4	Finance Act 1995	Section 160.
1997 c. 16	Finance Act 1997	Section 111.

==== Part V: Hereford and Worcester ====
Hereford and Worcester
Citation	Short title	Description	Extent of repeal
14 Cha. 2. c. 34	Bengeworth Bridge Act 1662	An Act for the repairing of Bengeworth bridge in the county of Worcester.	The whole act.
11 Geo. 2. c. 5	Worcester All Saints Church Act 1737	An Act for taking down and rebuilding the church of the parish of All Saints in the city of Worcester.	The whole act.
12 Geo. 2. c. 4	Worcester St Nicholas's Parish Act 1738	An Act to enable the inhabitants of the parish of Saint Nicholas in the city of Worcester to raise money for discharging the debts they have contracted in rebuilding their parish church.	The whole act.
9 Geo. 3. c. 84	Worcester Bridge Act 1769	An Act for building a bridge at Worcester over the river Severn, and for opening convenient avenues to the said bridge.	The whole act.
19 Geo. 3. c. 42	Worcester Bridge Act 1779	An Act to enable the trustees for putting in execution an Act [9 Geo. 3. c. 84] to finish and complete the said bridge, and to carry the purposes of the said Act into execution.	The whole act except section 9.
19 Geo. 3. c. 42	Worcester Bridge Act 1779	An Act to enable the trustees for putting in execution an Act [9 Geo. 3. c. 84] to finish and complete the said bridge, and to carry the purposes of the said Act into execution.	Section 9 from "shall hereafter wilfully or negligently deface" to "The Bargeman's Arch), or"; and from "or shall wilfully or negligently drive" to "leading to the same;".
22 Geo. 3. c. 112	Hardwicke to Pontrilas Roads Act 1782	An Act for repairing and widening the roads from a place called The Hardwicke, in the parish of Clifford, to Windmill Hill, and from Vowchurch to Pontrilas, in the county of Hereford.	The whole act.
25 Geo. 3. c. 94	Kidderminster Church Act 1785	An Act for repairing, new pewing, seating, and erecting galleries, and making other alterations and additions in and to the parish church of Kidderminster, in the county of Worcester.	The whole act.
35 Geo. 3. c. 78	Bewdley Bridge Act 1795	An Act for building a bridge over the river Severn, at Bewdley, in the County of Worcester, and for opening convenient avenues thereto.	The whole act except section 27.
35 Geo. 3. c. 78	Bewdley Bridge Act 1795	An Act for building a bridge over the river Severn, at Bewdley, in the County of Worcester, and for opening convenient avenues thereto.	Section 27 from "shall negligently deface," to "arches of the said bridge, or"; and from "or shall drive" to "avenues leading thereto,".
35 Geo. 3. c. 133	Worcester Improvement Act 1795	An Act to amend and render effectual so much of an Act of the twenty-eighth year of His present Majesty, as relates to improving the entrance into the city of Worcester, from the London and Upton roads.	The whole act.
48 Geo. 3. c. cxlviii	Leominster Inclosure Act 1808	An Act for inclosing lands in the borough of Leominster, in the county of Hereford, and in the township of Luston, in the parish of Eye, in the said county; and for paving and otherwise improving the streets and other public places within the town of Leominster, in the said county.	The whole act.
54 Geo. 3. c. ccxviii	Ombersley Church Act 1814	An Act for taking down the old church, tower and steeple of the parish of Ombersley, in the county of Worcester, and erecting a new church, and enlarging the church yard; and also, for building a workhouse for the poor of the said parish.	The whole act except section 32.
54 Geo. 3. c. ccxviii	Ombersley Church Act 1814	An Act for taking down the old church, tower and steeple of the parish of Ombersley, in the county of Worcester, and erecting a new church, and enlarging the church yard; and also, for building a workhouse for the poor of the said parish.	Section 32 from "and that until" to "the said old church;".
55 Geo. 3. c. ix	Hereford Shire Hall Act 1815	An Act for erecting a shire hall, courts of justice, and other buildings, for public purposes, and for providing suitable accommodations for His Majesty's justices of assize, in and for the county of Hereford.	The whole act.
4 Geo. 4. c. xxxii	Worcester Bridge Act 1823	An Act for altering and enlarging the powers of two Acts [9 Geo. 3. c. 84 and 19 Geo. 3. c. 42], for building and completing a bridge at Worcester over the river Severn, and for opening convenient avenues thereto.	The whole Act except sections 35, 39 and 40.
5 Geo. 4. c. lxvii	Evesham Improvement Act 1824	Evesham Improvement Act 1824.	The whole act except sections 66, 95 and 96 and Schedules A, B and C.
6 Geo. 4. c. lx	Kerne Bridge Act 1825	An Act for building a bridge over the river Wye, at a place called The Kerne, in the county of Hereford, and for making convenient roads, avenues and approaches thereto.	The whole Act except sections 2 and 3.
7 Geo. 4. c. lix	Holt Fleet Bridge Act 1826	An Act for building a bridge over the river Severn, at or near Holt Fleet, in the parishes of Holt and Ombersley in the county of Worcester; and for making approaches to such bridge.	The whole Act except sections 48, 49 and 107.
7 Geo. 4. c. lix	Holt Fleet Bridge Act 1826	An Act for building a bridge over the river Severn, at or near Holt Fleet, in the parishes of Holt and Ombersley in the county of Worcester; and for making approaches to such bridge.	Section 107 from "if any person shall ride upon any footpath" to "rails, or fences thereof; or"; and from "or shall haul or draw" to "setting down of any passenger,".
10 Geo. 4. c. cii	Kington Improvement Act 1829	An Act for lighting, watching, paving, cleansing, and improving the streets, highways, and places within the town and borough of Kington in the county of Hereford.	The whole act.
1 & 2 Will. 4. c. xlviii	Worcester County Hall Act 1831	An Act for erecting a county hall and courts of justice, and also for providing accommodation for His Majesty's justices of assize, in and for the county of Worcester.	The whole act.
5 & 6 Will. 4. c. i	Ledbury Improvement Act 1835	An Act for the improvement of the high street in the borough of Ledbury in the county of Hereford.	The whole act.
7 Will. 4 & 1 Vict. c. iii	Worcester County Hall Act 1837	An Act to amend and enlarge the powers of an Act [1 & 2 Will. 4. c. xlviii].	The whole act.
1 & 2 Vict. c. xiv	Leominster Inclosure Act 1838	An Act to amend an Act [48 Geo. 3. c. cxlviii].	The whole act.
3 & 4 Vict. c. cxxv	Hereford Improvement Act 1840	An Act to amend and render more effectual, so far as relates to the Lord Scudamore's charity monies, the provisions of an Act passed in the fourteenth year of the reign of His Majesty King George the Third, for improving the city of Hereford, and for other purposes connected with the said city.	Section 29.
4 & 5 Vict. c. lxxii	Kidderminster Poor Rate Act 1841	An Act for better assessing and collecting the poor rates in the borough of Kidderminster in the county of Worcester.	The whole act.
9 & 10 Vict. c. cxxiv	Bromsgrove Improvement Act 1846	An Act for paving, cleansing, draining and improving the town of Bromsgrove, for opening a new street therein and in the parish of Stoke Prior, both in the county of Worcester, and for the better assessing and collecting the poor, church and highway rates within the parish of Bromsgrove.	The whole act.
12 & 13 Vict. c. xii	Kidderminster Union Small Tenements Rating Act 1849	Kidderminster Union Small Tenements Rating Act 1849.	The whole act.
14 & 15 Vict. c. xcvi	Malvern Improvement Act 1851	Malvern Improvement Act 1851.	The whole act except sections 2, 14, 36, 50 and 62 and the Schedule.
16 & 17 Vict. c. xvi	Evesham Bridge Act 1853	Evesham Bridge Act 1853.	The whole act.
16 & 17 Vict. c. lxxvii	Leominster Markets and Fairs Act 1853	Leominster Markets and Fairs Act 1853.	The whole act except sections 1 to 3, 5, 24 to 26, 28, 35, 36, 43, 44, 46, 49, 50 and 51.
17 & 18 Vict. c. xxxi	Hereford Improvement Act 1854	Hereford Improvement Act 1854.	The whole act except sections 1, 3 to 5, 7, 12, 20, 21, 28 to 31, 43, 47, 48, 51, 52, 66, 67 and 103 and Schedule A.
18 & 19 Vict. c. v	Hoarwithy Bridge Act 1855	Hoarwithy Bridge Act 1855.	The whole act except sections 2 and 25 to 28.
18 & 19 Vict. c. clxxix	Hereford Improvement Act 1854 (Correction of Oversight) Act 1855	Hereford Improvement Act 1854 (Correction of Oversight) Act 1855.	The whole act.
20 & 21 Vict. c. xlviii	Fownhope and Holme Lacy Bridge Act 1857	Fownhope and Holme Lacy Bridge Act 1857.	The whole act except sections 1 and 34.
21 & 22 Vict. c. xxxi	Malvern Improvement Amendment Act 1858	Malvern Improvement Amendment Act 1858.	The whole act except sections 1 and 9 to 13.
24 & 25 Vict. c. 39	Local Government Supplemental Act 1861	Local Government Supplemental Act 1861.	Section 4.
24 & 25 Vict. c. 39	Local Government Supplemental Act 1861	Local Government Supplemental Act 1861.	In the Schedule, the order relating to Bromsgrove.
26 & 27 Vict. c. 32	Local Government Supplemental Act 1863	Local Government Supplemental Act 1863.	In the Schedule, the order relating to Bromsgrove.
28 & 29 Vict. c. 25	Local Government Supplemental Act 1865 (No. 2)	Local Government Supplemental Act 1865 (No. 2).	In the Schedule, the order relating to Bromsgrove.
28 & 29 Vict. c. cviii	Ross Improvement Act 1865	Ross Improvement Act 1865.	The whole act except— (a) sections 1, 3 to 5, 23 and 26; (b) section 28 from "the Commissioners shall" to "as they think fit."; (c) section 29 from "The Commissioners may" to "held within the Town,"; (d) sections 30 and 31; (e) section 32 from "The Commissioners may" to "as herein provided for;".
29 & 30 Vict. c. 107	Local Government Supplemental Act 1866 (No. 4)	Local Government Supplemental Act 1866 (No. 4).	In the Schedule, the order relating to Leominster.
29 & 30 Vict. c. xix	Bromsgrove and Droitwich Waterworks Act 1866	Bromsgrove and Droitwich Waterworks Act 1866.	The whole act.
30 & 31 Vict. c. 83	Local Government Supplemental Act 1867 (No. 5)	Local Government Supplemental Act 1867 (No. 5).	Section 1 from "except as" to the end.
30 & 31 Vict. c. 83	Local Government Supplemental Act 1867 (No. 5)	Local Government Supplemental Act 1867 (No. 5).	In the Schedule, the order relating to Malvern.
30 & 31 Vict. c. xxiii	Worcester Prison Act 1867	Worcester Prison Act 1867.	The whole act.
31 & 32 Vict. c. lxxxvi	Local Government Supplemental Act 1868 (No. 5)	Local Government Supplemental Act 1868 (No. 5).	In the Schedule, the order relating to Malvern.
32 & 33 Vict. c. lxxix	Ross Improvement Act (Amendment Act) 1869	Ross Improvement Act (Amendment Act) 1869.	The whole act.
33 & 34 Vict. c. cxiv	Local Government Supplemental Act 1870	Local Government Supplemental Act 1870.	Section 4.
33 & 34 Vict. c. cxiv	Local Government Supplemental Act 1870	Local Government Supplemental Act 1870.	In the Schedule, the order relating to Kidderminster.
34 & 35 Vict. c. i	Local Government Supplemental Act 1871	Local Government Supplemental Act 1871.	In the Schedule, the first order relating to Kidderminster.
34 & 35 Vict. c. li	Bromsgrove Waterworks Act 1871	Bromsgrove Waterworks Act 1871.	The whole act.
34 & 35 Vict. c. clxxxvii	Local Government Supplemental Act 1871 (No. 4)	Local Government Supplemental Act 1871 (No. 4).	In the Schedule, the order relating to Malvern.
35 & 36 Vict. c. cxix	Hereford Improvement Act 1872	Hereford Improvement Act 1872.	The whole act except sections 1, 2, 5, 10, 24 and 33.
38 & 39 Vict. c. clxviii	Local Government Board's Poor Law Provisional Orders Confirmation (Oxford, &c.) Act 1875	Local Government Board's Poor Law Provisional Orders Confirmation (Oxford, &c.) Act 1875.	In the Schedule, the order relating to the parishes of Sutton Saint Michael and Sutton Saint Nicholas.
38 & 39 Vict. c. cxciii	Local Government Board's Provisional Orders Confirmation (Leyton, &c.) Act 1875	Local Government Board's Provisional Orders Confirmation (Leyton, &c.) Act 1875.	In the Schedule, the order relating to Redditch.
39 & 40 Vict. c. clxi	Local Government Board's Provisional Orders Confirmation (Carnarvon, &c.) Act 1876	Local Government Board's Provisional Orders Confirmation (Carnarvon, &c.) Act 1876.	Section 2.
39 & 40 Vict. c. clxi	Local Government Board's Provisional Orders Confirmation (Carnarvon, &c.) Act 1876	Local Government Board's Provisional Orders Confirmation (Carnarvon, &c.) Act 1876.	In the Schedule, the order relating to Tenbury Wells.
40 & 41 Vict. c. ccxlii	Local Government Board's Provisional Orders Confirmation (Atherton, &c.) Act 1877	Local Government Board's Provisional Orders Confirmation (Atherton, &c.) Act 1877.	In the Schedule, the Evesham Order 1877.
41 & 42 Vict. c. lvii	Local Government Board's (Gas) Provisional Orders Confirmation (Droitwich, &c.) Act 1878	Local Government Board's (Gas) Provisional Orders Confirmation (Droitwich, &c.) Act 1878.	In the Schedule, the Droitwich Gas Order 1878.
42 & 43 Vict. c. lxxvii	Local Government Board's (Highways) Provisional Orders Confirmation (Buckingham, &c.) Act 1879	Local Government Board's (Highways) Provisional Orders Confirmation (Buckingham, &c.) Act 1879.	In the Schedule, the order relating to the county of Worcester.
42 & 43 Vict. c. lxxxiv	Local Government Board's (Highways) Provisional Orders Confirmation (Gloucester and Hereford) Act 1879	Local Government Board's (Highways) Provisional Orders Confirmation (Gloucester and Hereford) Act 1879.	In the Schedule, the order relating to the county of Hereford.
43 & 44 Vict. c. lviii	Local Government Board's Provisional Orders Confirmation (Abergavenny, &c.) Act 1880	Local Government Board's Provisional Orders Confirmation (Abergavenny, &c.) Act 1880.	In the Schedule, the order relating to Bromsgrove.
44 & 45 Vict. c. lxii	Local Government Board's Provisional Orders Confirmation (Poor Law, No. 2) Act 1881	Local Government Board's Provisional Orders Confirmation (Poor Law, No. 2) Act 1881.	In the Schedule, the orders relating to the Bromsgrove Union and the Droitwich Union.
44 & 45 Vict. c. clxiv	Tramways Orders Confirmation (No. 3) Act 1881	Tramways Orders Confirmation (No. 3) Act 1881.	In the Schedule, the Worcester Tramways Order 1881 except Articles 1, 3, 4 and 9.
45 & 46 Vict. c. ccxxxi	Ross District Water Act 1882	Ross District Water Act 1882.	The whole act.
46 & 47 Vict. c. lxxx	Local Government Board's Provisional Orders Confirmation (Poor Law) Act 1883	Local Government Board's Provisional Orders Confirmation (Poor Law) Act 1883.	In the Schedule, the two orders relating to the Ross Union.
46 & 47 Vict. c. lxxxix	Local Government Board's Provisional Orders Confirmation (No. 3) Act 1883	Local Government Board's Provisional Orders Confirmation (No. 3) Act 1883.	In the Schedule, the order relating to the Evesham Joint Hospital District and the order relating to the Improvement District of Kington.
46 & 47 Vict. c. cxxxviii	Local Government Board's Provisional Orders Confirmation (Poor Law) (No. 2) Act 1883	Local Government Board's Provisional Orders Confirmation (Poor Law) (No. 2) Act 1883.	In the Schedule, the order relating to the Ross and Westbury-upon-Severn Unions.
47 & 48 Vict. c. xlviii	Local Government Board's Provisional Orders Confirmation (Poor Law) (No. 7) Act 1884	Local Government Board's Provisional Orders Confirmation (Poor Law) (No. 7) Act 1884.	The whole act.
47 & 48 Vict. c. clviii	Local Government Board's Provisional Orders Confirmation (No. 2) Act 1884	Local Government Board's Provisional Orders Confirmation (No. 2) Act 1884.	In the Schedule, the order relating to Malvern.
48 & 49 Vict. c. lxii	Local Government Board's Provisional Orders Confirmation (No. 5) Act 1885	Local Government Board's Provisional Orders Confirmation (No. 5) Act 1885.	In the Schedule, the order relating to Bromsgrove.
48 & 49 Vict. c. lxvi	Tramways Orders Confirmation (No. 1) Act 1885	Tramways Orders Confirmation (No. 1) Act 1885.	In the Schedule, the Worcester Tramways Order 1881 Amendment Order 1885.
48 & 49 Vict. c. cvii	Local Government Board's Provisional Orders Confirmation (No. 7) Act 1885	Local Government Board's Provisional Orders Confirmation (No. 7) Act 1885.	In the Schedule, the order relating to the borough of Evesham.
50 Vict. c. v	Local Government Board's Provisional Orders Confirmation (Gas) Act 1886	Local Government Board's Provisional Orders Confirmation (Gas) Act 1886.	In the Schedule, the Droitwich Gas Order 1886.
50 & 51 Vict. c. lxxxiv	Local Government Board's Provisional Orders Confirmation (No. 2) Act 1887	Local Government Board's Provisional Orders Confirmation (No. 2) Act 1887.	In the Schedule, the order relating to the borough of Evesham.
50 & 51 Vict. c. cxxiii	Tramways Orders Confirmation (No. 2) Act 1887	Tramways Orders Confirmation (No. 2) Act 1887.	In the Schedule, the Worcester Tramways Order 1887.
53 & 54 Vict. c. clxxxi	Tramways Orders Confirmation (No. 1) Act 1890	Tramways Orders Confirmation (No. 1) Act 1890.	In the Schedule, the Worcester Tramways (Abandonment and Release of Deposit) Order 1890.
53 & 54 Vict. c. clxxxvi	Electric Lighting Orders Confirmation Act 1890	Electric Lighting Orders Confirmation Act 1890.	In the Schedule, the Worcester Electric Lighting Order 1890.
53 & 54 Vict. c. clxxxviii	Electric Lighting Orders Confirmation (No. 3) Act 1890	Electric Lighting Orders Confirmation (No. 3) Act 1890.	In the Schedule, the Malvern Electric Lighting Order 1890.
54 & 55 Vict. c. lii	Electric Lighting Orders Confirmation (No. 4) Act 1891	Electric Lighting Orders Confirmation (No. 4) Act 1891.	In the Schedule, the Kidderminster Electric Lighting Order 1891.
54 & 55 Vict. c. xcvi	Malvern Water Act 1891	Malvern Water Act 1891.	Sections 18 to 20, 56 and 59 and the Schedule.
55 & 56 Vict. c. xxiii	Stourport Bridge Transfer Act 1892	Stourport Bridge Transfer Act 1892.	The whole act.
55 & 56 Vict. c. ccxxvi	Water Orders Confirmation Act 1892	Water Orders Confirmation Act 1892.	In the Schedule, Articles 15 and 16 of the Ross Water Order 1892.
56 & 57 Vict. c. cx	Local Government Board's Provisional Order Confirmation (No. 3) Act 1893	Local Government Board's Provisional Order Confirmation (No. 3) Act 1893.	The whole act.
56 & 57 Vict. c. cxxxii	Local Government Board's Provisional Orders Confirmation (No. 16) Act 1893	Local Government Board's Provisional Orders Confirmation (No. 16) Act 1893.	In the Schedule, the order relating to the Counties of Hereford and Monmouth and the order relating to the Counties of Hereford and Worcester.
58 & 59 Vict. c. lxxxvi	Local Government Board's Provisional Orders Confirmation (No. 5) Act 1895	Local Government Board's Provisional Orders Confirmation (No. 5) Act 1895.	In the Schedule, the County of Worcester (Dowles and Upper Arley) Order 1895.
59 Vict. Sess. 2. c. v	Local Government Board's Provisional Orders Confirmation (No. 3) Act 1895	Local Government Board's Provisional Orders Confirmation (No. 3) Act 1895.	In the Schedule, the Upton upon Severn (Hanley Castle and Welland) Order 1895.
59 & 60 Vict. c. lxxii	Malvern Link (Extension and Water) Act 1896	Malvern Link (Extension and Water) Act 1896.	The whole act except sections 1, 3, 41 to 43, 45, 47, 49, 57, 58 and 60.
59 & 60 Vict. c. cii	Local Government Board's Provisional Orders Confirmation (No. 7) Act 1896	Local Government Board's Provisional Orders Confirmation (No. 7) Act 1896.	In the Schedule, the Evesham Joint Hospital Order 1896.
59 & 60 Vict. c. ccxxviii	Kidderminster and Stourport Electric Tramway Act 1896	Kidderminster and Stourport Electric Tramway Act 1896.	The whole act.
60 & 61 Vict. c. lxv	Electric Lighting Orders Confirmation (No. 5) Act 1897	Electric Lighting Orders Confirmation (No. 5) Act 1897.	In the Schedule, the Redditch Electric Lighting Order 1897.
60 & 61 Vict. c. lxxv	Local Government Board's Provisional Orders Confirmation (No. 10) Act 1897	Local Government Board's Provisional Orders Confirmation (No. 10) Act 1897.	The whole act.
60 & 61 Vict. c. lxxvi	Local Government Board's Provisional Order Confirmation (Gas) Act 1897	Local Government Board's Provisional Order Confirmation (Gas) Act 1897.	The whole act.
60 & 61 Vict. c. cxxxvi	Malvern Link Gas Act 1897	Malvern Link Gas Act 1897.	The whole act except sections 1, 3 and 20.
61 & 62 Vict. c. xxxi	Local Government Board's Provisional Orders Confirmation (No. 1) Act 1898	Local Government Board's Provisional Orders Confirmation (No. 1) Act 1898.	In the Schedule, the Tewkesbury Rural Order 1898.
61 & 62 Vict. c. xxxix	Electric Lighting Orders Confirmation (No. 3) Act 1898	Electric Lighting Orders Confirmation (No. 3) Act 1898.	In the Schedule, the Hereford Electric Lighting Order 1898.
1 Edw. 7. c. cli	Local Government Board's Provisional Orders Confirmation (No. 10) Act 1901	Local Government Board's Provisional Orders Confirmation (No. 10) Act 1901.	In the Schedule, the order relating to the Upton-upon-Severn and Pershore Joint Hospital District.
1 Edw. 7. c. cxci	Worcester Tramways Act 1901	Worcester Tramways Act 1901.	The whole act except sections 1, 3 and 13(A) and (D).
1902 Cd. 1027	Worcester and District Light Railways Order 1901	Worcester and District Light Railways Order 1901.	The whole Order except Articles 1, 2 and 31.
1902 Cd. 1023	Worcester (Extension) Light Railways Order 1902	Worcester (Extension) Light Railways Order 1902.	The whole Order except Articles 1, 2, 9 and 12(e).
3 Edw. 7. c. lix	Local Government Board's Provisional Orders Confirmation (No. 2) Act 1903	Local Government Board's Provisional Orders Confirmation (No. 2) Act 1903.	In the Schedule, the Yardley Rural Order 1903.
3 Edw. 7. c. lx	Local Government Board's Provisional Orders Confirmation (No. 3) Act 1903	Local Government Board's Provisional Orders Confirmation (No. 3) Act 1903.	The whole act.
4 Edw. 7. c. lxv	Local Government Board's Provisional Order Confirmation (Poor Law) Act 1904	Local Government Board's Provisional Order Confirmation (Poor Law) Act 1904.	The whole act.
5 Edw. 7. c. cxxxiii	Worcestershire County Council (Bridges) Act 1905	Worcestershire County Council (Bridges) Act 1905.	The whole act.
5 Edw. 7. c. clxxxiv	Malvern Water Act 1905	Malvern Water Act 1905.	Sections 2, 7, 8, 23 and 27 and Schedules 1 and 2.
7 Edw. 7. c. clxi	Local Government Board's Provisional Orders Confirmation (No. 11) Act 1907	Local Government Board's Provisional Orders Confirmation (No. 11) Act 1907.	In the Schedule, the Evesham Order 1907.
9 Edw. 7. c. xci	Stourbridge and District Water Board Act 1909	Stourbridge and District Water Board Act 1909.	Sections 51 and 54 and the Schedule.
1 & 2 Geo. 5. c. cxlix	Local Government Board's Provisional Orders Confirmation (No. 14) Act 1911	Local Government Board's Provisional Orders Confirmation (No. 14) Act 1911.	In the Schedule, the Hereford Order 1911.
1 & 2 Geo. 5. c. clii	Local Government Board's Provisional Order Confirmation (Gas) (No. 2) Act 1911	Local Government Board's Provisional Order Confirmation (Gas) (No. 2) Act 1911.	The whole act.
1 & 2 Geo. 5. c. cliv	Education Board Provisional Orders Confirmation (Durham, &c.) Act 1911	Education Board Provisional Orders Confirmation (Durham, &c.) Act 1911.	In the Schedule, the order relating to Worcestershire County Council.
2 & 3 Geo. 5. c. cxxix	Local Government Board's Provisional Orders Confirmation (No. 3) Act 1912	Local Government Board's Provisional Orders Confirmation (No. 3) Act 1912.	In the Schedule, the Kington Order 1912.
2 & 3 Geo. 5. c. cxxxi	Local Government Board's Provisional Order Confirmation (No. 5) Act 1912	Local Government Board's Provisional Order Confirmation (No. 5) Act 1912.	The whole act.
13 & 14 Geo. 5. c. xxxvi	Ministry of Health Provisional Orders Confirmation (No. 3) Act 1923	Ministry of Health Provisional Orders Confirmation (No. 3) Act 1923.	In the Schedule, the Hereford Order 1923.
13 & 14 Geo. 5. c. xli	Ministry of Health Provisional Orders Confirmation (No. 8) Act 1923	Ministry of Health Provisional Orders Confirmation (No. 8) Act 1923.	In the Schedule, Article 8(3) of and the Schedule to the Stourbridge and District Water Board Order 1923.
16 & 17 Geo. 5. c. lxxiii	Kidderminster and Stourport Electric Tramway Act 1926	Kidderminster and Stourport Electric Tramway Act 1926.	The whole act.
17 & 18 Geo. 5. c. xxxviii	Ministry of Health Provisional Orders Confirmation (No. 9) Act 1927	Ministry of Health Provisional Orders Confirmation (No. 9) Act 1927.	In the Schedule, the Hereford Order 1927.
20 & 21 Geo. 5. c. xxx	Ministry of Health Provisional Orders Confirmation (No. 11) Act 1929	Ministry of Health Provisional Orders Confirmation (No. 11) Act 1929.	In the Schedule, the Upton upon Severn Order 1929.
20 & 21 Geo. 5. c. xxxiii	Ministry of Health Provisional Orders Confirmation (Bristol and Ross Water) Act 1929	Ministry of Health Provisional Orders Confirmation (Bristol and Ross Water) Act 1929.	In the Schedule, Articles 46 and 51 of the Ross Water Order 1929.
20 & 21 Geo. 5. c. cv	Ministry of Health Provisional Orders Confirmation (Kidderminster and Llanelly) Act 1930	Ministry of Health Provisional Orders Confirmation (Kidderminster and Llanelly) Act 1930.	The whole act.
SR&O 1931/269	Herefordshire (Ross Urban, Ross Rural and Whitchurch Rural) Order 1931	Herefordshire (Ross Urban, Ross Rural and Whitchurch Rural) Order 1931.	The whole order.
SR&O 1931/939	Evesham Joint Hospital Order 1931	Evesham Joint Hospital Order 1931.	The whole order.
23 & 24 Geo. 5. c. xvii	Ministry of Health Provisional Orders Confirmation (Hereford and West Kent Main Sewerage District) Act 1933	Ministry of Health Provisional Orders Confirmation (Hereford and West Kent Main Sewerage District) Act 1933.	In the Schedule, the Hereford Order 1933.
SR&O 1933/1243	County of Worcester Review Order 1933	County of Worcester Review Order 1933.	The whole order except Articles 1, 2 and 57(1) so far as it applies to Severn Trent Water Limited.
26 Geo. 5 & 1 Edw. 8. c. cxiii	Hereford Corporation Act 1936	Hereford Corporation Act 1936.	The whole act except— (a) sections 1, 4, 11, 12 and 66 to 72; (b) section 76 from "The Corporation" to "their control", and from "and may" to "use thereof."; (c) sections 165, 167, 169 and 171 and Schedules 1 and 2.
1 Edw. 8 & 1 Geo. 6. c. iv	Ministry of Health Provisional Order Confirmation (Evesham and Pershore Joint Hospital District) Act 1937	Ministry of Health Provisional Order Confirmation (Evesham and Pershore Joint Hospital District) Act 1937.	The whole act.
SI 1958/1760	Kington Rural District Water Order 1958	Kington Rural District Water Order 1958.	Article 4(3).
SI 1958/1822	Weobley Rural District Water Order 1958	Weobley Rural District Water Order 1958.	Article 4(2).
SI 1959/1375	Herefordshire Water Board Order 1959	Herefordshire Water Board Order 1959.	The whole order except Articles 1, 2, 19, 23, 24 and 25(1) and Schedule 4.
SI 1959/1486	Malvern Water (Revocation) Order 1959	Malvern Water (Revocation) Order 1959.	The whole order.
SI 1961/2482	Stourbridge and District Water Board Order 1961	Stourbridge and District Water Board Order 1961.	Article 11.
SI 1961/2482	Stourbridge and District Water Board Order 1961	Stourbridge and District Water Board Order 1961.	Schedule 2.
SI 1962/717	Herefordshire Water Board Order 1962	Herefordshire Water Board Order 1962.	The whole order.
SI 1962/1561	North West Worcestershire Water Board Order 1962	North West Worcestershire Water Board Order 1962.	The whole order except Articles 1, 3, 26, 28, 30(1)(a) and (2), 31 and Schedule 7.
SI 1962/1561	North West Worcestershire Water Board Order 1962	North West Worcestershire Water Board Order 1962.	Schedule 7 so far as it applies to— (a) sections 39, 51 and 54 of the Stourbridge and District Water Board Act 1909; (b) Article 8(3) of the Stourbridge and District Water Board Order 1923; (c) Article 11 of the Stourbridge and District Water Board Order 1961.
SI 1963/262	Herefordshire Water Board Order 1963	Herefordshire Water Board Order 1963.	The whole order.
SI 1963/1136	Herefordshire Water Board (No. 2) Order 1963	Herefordshire Water Board (No. 2) Order 1963.	Article 3.
SI 1964/905	Herefordshire Water Board (Baron's Cross Water Tower and Pipeline) Order 1964	Herefordshire Water Board (Baron's Cross Water Tower and Pipeline) Order 1964.	Articles 4 and 5.
SI 1964/1049	Worcester Water Order 1964	Worcester Water Order 1964.	Article 5.
SI 1964/1049	Worcester Water Order 1964	Worcester Water Order 1964.	Schedule 1 except so far as it refers to paragraph 10 of Schedule 3 to the Water Act 1945.
SI 1965/4	Herefordshire Water Board (Withington) Order 1965	Herefordshire Water Board (Withington) Order 1965.	Article 5.
SI 1965/4	Herefordshire Water Board (Withington) Order 1965	Herefordshire Water Board (Withington) Order 1965.	Schedule 2.
SI 1965/155	Herefordshire Water Board Order 1965	Herefordshire Water Board Order 1965.	The whole order.
SI 1965/1847	Herefordshire Water Board (No. 2) Order 1965	Herefordshire Water Board (No. 2) Order 1965.	The whole order.
SI 1967/296	North West Worcestershire Water Board Order 1967	North West Worcestershire Water Board Order 1967.	Articles 3, 4 and 6.
SI 1967/296	North West Worcestershire Water Board Order 1967	North West Worcestershire Water Board Order 1967.	Schedule 1.
SI 1968/395	North West Worcestershire Water Board (Chaddesley Corbett) Order 1968	North West Worcestershire Water Board (Chaddesley Corbett) Order 1968.	Articles 3 and 5.
SI 1968/395	North West Worcestershire Water Board (Chaddesley Corbett) Order 1968	North West Worcestershire Water Board (Chaddesley Corbett) Order 1968.	Schedule 1.
SI 1968/1405	South West Worcestershire Water Board Order 1968	South West Worcestershire Water Board Order 1968.	The whole order except Articles 1, 2, 19(2), (5) and (6), 22, 23, 24(1), (2) and (3) and Schedule 4.
SI 1968/1405	South West Worcestershire Water Board Order 1968	South West Worcestershire Water Board Order 1968.	Schedule 4 so far as it saves— (a) section 48 of the Malvern Link (Extension and Water) Act 1896; (b) sections 23 and 27 and Schedules 1 and 2 of the Malvern Water Act 1905.
SI 1968/1790	North West Worcestershire Water Board (Waresley Boreholes) Order 1968	North West Worcestershire Water Board (Waresley Boreholes) Order 1968.	The whole order except— (a) Articles 1, 2 and 5(2); (b) Schedule 1, paragraph 2.
1969 c. xliv	Kidderminster Corporation Act 1969	Kidderminster Corporation Act 1969.	The whole act except sections 1 to 3, 99 to 106, 132, 134, 136, 137, 139 to 141, 142(1), 143 and 144 and Schedules 1 and 3 Part I.
1969 c. lvi	Worcestershire County Council Act 1969	Worcestershire County Council Act 1969.	The whole act except sections 1, 3, 18 and 85.
SI 1969/601	Herefordshire Water Board (Credenhill Camp Pipeline) Order 1969	Herefordshire Water Board (Credenhill Camp Pipeline) Order 1969.	Articles 4 and 5.
SI 1969/1012	North West Worcestershire Water Board Order 1969	North West Worcestershire Water Board Order 1969.	The whole order.
SI 1970/333	South West Worcestershire Water Board (Charges) Order 1970	South West Worcestershire Water Board (Charges) Order 1970.	The whole order.
SI 1970/1642	South West Worcestershire Water Board (Warndon) Order 1970	South West Worcestershire Water Board (Warndon) Order 1970.	The whole order.
SI 1972/251	South West Worcestershire Water Board Order 1972	South West Worcestershire Water Board Order 1972.	The whole order.
SI 1973/1133	North West Worcestershire Water Board (Charges) Order 1973	North West Worcestershire Water Board (Charges) Order 1973.	The whole order.
SI 1973/1691	North West Worcestershire Water Board (Timber Lane, Stourport) Order 1973	North West Worcestershire Water Board (Timber Lane, Stourport) Order 1973.	Articles 3 and 5.
SI 1973/1691	North West Worcestershire Water Board (Timber Lane, Stourport) Order 1973	North West Worcestershire Water Board (Timber Lane, Stourport) Order 1973.	Schedule 1.
SI 1973/1692	North West Worcestershire Water Board (Barrow Hill) Order 1973	North West Worcestershire Water Board (Barrow Hill) Order 1973.	Articles 3 and 5.
SI 1973/1692	North West Worcestershire Water Board (Barrow Hill) Order 1973	North West Worcestershire Water Board (Barrow Hill) Order 1973.	Schedule 1.
SI 1974/700	South West Worcestershire Water Board (River Teme) Order 1974	South West Worcestershire Water Board (River Teme) Order 1974.	Articles 3 to 5, 8, 9 and 11 and the Schedule.

==== Part VI: Inclosure Acts ====
Inclosure Acts
Citation	Short title	Extent of repeal
8 & 9 Vict. c. 118	Inclosure Act 1845	In section 9, the words from "and the commissioners may" to "such matter".
8 & 9 Vict. c. 118	Inclosure Act 1845	In section 12, the first proviso.
8 & 9 Vict. c. 118	Inclosure Act 1845	Sections 28 to 48.
8 & 9 Vict. c. 118	Inclosure Act 1845	In section 49, the words "the valuer, or" in both places where they occur, and the words "such valuer, or".
8 & 9 Vict. c. 118	Inclosure Act 1845	Sections 50 to 55.
8 & 9 Vict. c. 118	Inclosure Act 1845	Section 57.
8 & 9 Vict. c. 118	Inclosure Act 1845	Sections 59 and 60.
8 & 9 Vict. c. 118	Inclosure Act 1845	In section 61, the words from the beginning to "but", and the proviso.
8 & 9 Vict. c. 118	Inclosure Act 1845	Sections 62 to 66.
8 & 9 Vict. c. 118	Inclosure Act 1845	In section 68, the words from the beginning to "borne by, and".
8 & 9 Vict. c. 118	Inclosure Act 1845	Sections 69 to 71.
8 & 9 Vict. c. 118	Inclosure Act 1845	In section 72, the words from the beginning to "think fit, and".
8 & 9 Vict. c. 118	Inclosure Act 1845	In section 73, the words from the beginning to "as the valuer may direct;" and the words from "and the valuer shall in like manner set out" to "poor for the time being of the parish in which such allotments shall be situate;".
8 & 9 Vict. c. 118	Inclosure Act 1845	Sections 76 and 77.
8 & 9 Vict. c. 118	Inclosure Act 1845	Sections 79 to 82.
8 & 9 Vict. c. 118	Inclosure Act 1845	In section 83, the words from the beginning to "direct; and" in the first place where it occurs, and from "and if" to the end.
8 & 9 Vict. c. 118	Inclosure Act 1845	Sections 84 to 92.
8 & 9 Vict. c. 118	Inclosure Act 1845	Sections 95 and 97.
8 & 9 Vict. c. 118	Inclosure Act 1845	Sections 99 to 104.
8 & 9 Vict. c. 118	Inclosure Act 1845	In section 107 the words from the beginning to "valuer; and", and from "and all" to the end.
8 & 9 Vict. c. 118	Inclosure Act 1845	Section 113.
8 & 9 Vict. c. 118	Inclosure Act 1845	In section 114, the words from "examination" to "award, and".
8 & 9 Vict. c. 118	Inclosure Act 1845	In section 115, the words from the beginning to "Act; and".
8 & 9 Vict. c. 118	Inclosure Act 1845	In section 123, the words "or valuer" in both places where they occur.
8 & 9 Vict. c. 118	Inclosure Act 1845	Sections 124 to 129.
8 & 9 Vict. c. 118	Inclosure Act 1845	Sections 133 to 138.
8 & 9 Vict. c. 118	Inclosure Act 1845	Sections 140 to 144.
8 & 9 Vict. c. 118	Inclosure Act 1845	Sections 152 to 154.
8 & 9 Vict. c. 118	Inclosure Act 1845	Sections 156 and 157.
8 & 9 Vict. c. 118	Inclosure Act 1845	In section 162, the words "or valuer" in both places where they occur.
8 & 9 Vict. c. 118	Inclosure Act 1845	In the Schedule, the Form of Conveyance by Commissioners.
9 & 10 Vict. c. 70	Inclosure Act 1846	Sections 1 to 5.
10 & 11 Vict. c. 111	Inclosure Act 1847	Sections 3, 5 and 6.
10 & 11 Vict. c. 111	Inclosure Act 1847	In section 7 the words from "and" to the end.
11 & 12 Vict. c. 99	Inclosure Act 1848	Sections 1 to 3.
11 & 12 Vict. c. 99	Inclosure Act 1848	In section 4, the words from the beginning to "direct; and".
11 & 12 Vict. c. 99	Inclosure Act 1848	Section 5.
11 & 12 Vict. c. 99	Inclosure Act 1848	Sections 8 and 9.
11 & 12 Vict. c. 99	Inclosure Act 1848	Section 11.
11 & 12 Vict. c. 99	Inclosure Act 1848	Sections 13 and 14.
12 & 13 Vict. c. 83	Inclosure Act 1849	Sections 1 to 6.
12 & 13 Vict. c. 83	Inclosure Act 1849	In section 7, the words "and partition", the words ", and also to the partition of the same respectively", and the words "or partitioned".
12 & 13 Vict. c. 83	Inclosure Act 1849	Sections 8, 9 and 10.
14 & 15 Vict. c. 53	Inclosure Commissioners Act 1851	The whole act.
15 & 16 Vict. c. 79	Inclosure Act 1852	In section 1, the words from ", as in the Inclosure Act 1845" to the end.
15 & 16 Vict. c. 79	Inclosure Act 1852	Sections 3 to 13.
15 & 16 Vict. c. 79	Inclosure Act 1852	Sections 15 and 16.
15 & 16 Vict. c. 79	Inclosure Act 1852	Section 20.
15 & 16 Vict. c. 79	Inclosure Act 1852	Sections 23 to 27.
15 & 16 Vict. c. 79	Inclosure Act 1852	Sections 30 to 32.
17 & 18 Vict. c. 97	Inclosure Act 1854	Sections 1 and 2.
17 & 18 Vict. c. 97	Inclosure Act 1854	Sections 6 and 7.
20 & 21 Vict. c. 31	Inclosure Act 1857	In section 3, the words from "or any" to "inclosure" and the words "or valuer respectively".
20 & 21 Vict. c. 31	Inclosure Act 1857	Section 13.
22 & 23 Vict. c. 43	Inclosure Act 1859	Sections 1 and 2.
22 & 23 Vict. c. 43	Inclosure Act 1859	In section 7, the words from the beginning to "award; and".
22 & 23 Vict. c. 43	Inclosure Act 1859	Sections 8 to 11.
22 & 23 Vict. c. 43	Inclosure Act 1859	Sections 13 and 14.
31 & 32 Vict. c. 89	Inclosure, etc., Expenses Act 1868	Sections 4 and 5.
39 & 40 Vict. c. 56	Commons Act 1876	Sections 2 to 6.
39 & 40 Vict. c. 56	Commons Act 1876	Section 9.
39 & 40 Vict. c. 56	Commons Act 1876	Sections 12 to 14.
39 & 40 Vict. c. 56	Commons Act 1876	Section 18.
39 & 40 Vict. c. 56	Commons Act 1876	Sections 21 to 23.
39 & 40 Vict. c. 56	Commons Act 1876	Section 32.
41 & 42 Vict. c. 56	Commons (Expenses) Act 1878	Section 3.

==== Part VII: Scottish Local Acts ====
Scottish Local Acts
Citation	Short title	Extent of repeal
Group 1 – Aid to the Poor, Charities and Private Pensions
41 Geo. 3. (G.B) c. iii	Edinburgh Poor Relief Act 1800	The whole act.
43 Geo. 3. c. cvii	Writers to the Signet Widows' Fund Act 1803	The whole act.
45 Geo. 3. c. xxxi	Excise Incorporation in Scotland Act 1805	The whole act.
58 Geo. 3. c. lxxiv	Writers to the Signet Widows' Fund Act 1818	The whole act.
3 & 4 Will. 4. c. lxiv	Faculty of Procurators of Glasgow Widows Fund Act 1833	The whole act.
3 & 4 Vict. c. xciii	Glasgow Poor Act 1840	The whole act.
7 & 8 Vict. c. vi	Edinburgh Charity Workhouse Act 1844	The whole act.
23 & 24 Vict. c. clxxvi	Royal College of Surgeons of Edinburgh (Widows Fund) Act 1860	The whole act.
38 & 39 Vict. c. vi	Glasgow Faculty of Procurators Widows Fund Act 1875	The whole act.
43 & 44 Vict. c. xxxii	Faculty of Physicians and Surgeons of Glasgow Widows Fund Act 1880	The whole act.
58 & 59 Vict. c. xxx	Ayr Faculty of Solicitors Widows' Fund Society Act 1895	The whole act.
1 & 2 Geo. 5. c. xxxiii	St Andrew's Ambulance Association Order Confirmation Act 1911	The whole act.
1989 c. xviii	Scottish Episcopal Clergy Widows' and Orphans' Fund Order Confirmation Act 1989	The whole act.
1990 c. xxix	Zetland Masonic Sick and Widows and Orphans Fund Order Confirmation Act 1990	The whole act.
Group 2 – Dog Wardens
1976 c. v	City of Aberdeen District Council Order Confirmation Act 1976	The whole act.
1978 c. xviii	Cunninghame District Council Order Confirmation Act 1978	The whole act.
1978 c. xx	District Council of Renfrew Order Confirmation Act 1978	The whole act.
1979 c. ii	Inverclyde District Council Order Confirmation Act 1979	The whole act.
1979 c. xviii	Dumbarton District Council Order Confirmation Act 1979	The whole act.
1981 c. i	Bearsden and Milngavie District Council Order Confirmation Act 1981	The whole act.
Group 3 – Education
47 & 48 Vict. c. ccl	Scotch Education Department Provisional Order Confirmation (Ardchattan and Muckairn) Act 1884	The whole act.
4 Edw. 7. c. cxlviii	Scotch Education Department Provisional Order Confirmation (Edinburgh) Act 1904	The whole act.
8 Edw. 7. c. i	Transfer of Training Colleges (Scotland) Order Confirmation Act 1908	The whole act.
16 & 17 Geo. 5. c. xxxvii	Glasgow Education Authority (Juvenile Delinquency) Order Confirmation Act 1926	The whole act.
Group 4 – Insurance Companies
4 & 5 Vict. c. xcvi	Scottish Marine Insurance Company Act 1841	The whole act.
6 & 7 Vict. c. cvii	Glasgow Marine Insurance Company Act 1843	The whole act.
10 & 11 Vict. c. xxxiv	Scottish Union Insurance Company Act 1847	The whole act.
22 & 23 Vict. c. xlix	Scottish National Insurance Company's Incorporation Act 1859	The whole act.
24 & 25 Vict. c. cxlv	City of Glasgow Life Assurance Company's Act 1861	The whole act.
47 & 48 Vict. c. xxiii	Scottish Imperial Insurance Company's Act 1884	The whole act.
55 & 56 Vict. c. iii	City of Glasgow Life Assurance Company Act 1892	The whole act.
6 Edw. 7. c. xxx	Norwich Union Life Insurance Society (Scottish Imperial Fusion) Act 1906	The whole act.
Group 5 – Local Authority Finance
3 & 4 Eliz. 2. c. i	Dunoon Burgh (Pavilion Expenditure) Order Confirmation Act 1954	The whole act.
1970 c. xxxvi	Midlothian County Council Order Confirmation Act 1970	The whole act.
1970 c. xxxvii	West Lothian County Council Order Confirmation Act 1970	The whole act.
1970 c. lvi	Aberdeen Corporation Order Confirmation Act 1970	The whole act.
1970 c. lix	Dundee Corporation Order Confirmation Act 1970	The whole act.
1971 c. xxxviii	Lanarkshire County Council Order Confirmation Act 1971	The whole act.
1974 c. iv	Renfrew County Council Order Confirmation Act 1974	The whole act.
Group 6 – Order Confirmation Acts
3 Edw. 7. c. cxlix	Scottish Episcopal Clergy Widows' and Orphans' Fund Order Confirmation Act 1903	The whole act.
7 Edw. 7. c. cl	Dumbarton Burgh Order Confirmation Act 1907	The whole act.
9 Edw. 7. c. i	Zetland Masonic Sick and Widows and Orphans Fund Order Confirmation Act 1909	The whole act.
1 & 2 Geo. 5. c. cxxix	Partick Burgh Order Confirmation Act 1911	The whole act.
1 & 2 Geo. 5. c. clix	Pier and Harbour Order Confirmation (No. 3) Act 1911	The whole act.
3 & 4 Geo. 5. c. cxlvii	Pier and Harbour Orders Confirmation (No. 2) Act 1913	The whole act.
4 & 5 Geo. 5. c. lxviii	Lanarkshire Gas Order Confirmation Act 1914	The whole act.
9 & 10 Geo. 5. c. lxxi	Pier and Harbour Orders Confirmation Act 1919	The whole act.
9 & 10 Geo. 5. c. cx	Scottish Amicable Life Assurance Society's Order Confirmation Act 1919	The whole act.
11 & 12 Geo. 5. c. xii	Dundee Gas Order Confirmation Act 1921	The whole act.
14 & 15 Geo. 5. c. iv	Leith Harbour and Docks Order Confirmation Act 1924	The whole act.
20 & 21 Geo. 5. c. xi	Leith Harbour and Docks Order Confirmation Act 1929	The whole act.
22 & 23 Geo. 5. c. xxii	St Andrews Links Order Confirmation Act 1932	The whole act.
1 & 2 Eliz. 2. c. xix	Clyde Navigation Order Confirmation Act 1953	The whole act.
4 & 5 Eliz. 2. c. ii	Writers to the Signet Widows' Fund Order Confirmation Act 1955	The whole act.
1965 c. xii	Writers to the Signet Widows' Fund Order Confirmation Act 1965	The whole act.
1973 c. vi	Mallaig Harbour Order Confirmation Act 1973	The whole act.
1975 c. xiii	Fraserburgh Harbour Order Confirmation Act 1975	The whole act.
Group 7 – Oyster and Mussel Fisheries
32 & 33 Vict. c. lxx	Oyster and Mussel Fisheries Order Confirmation Act 1869	The whole act.
33 & 34 Vict. c. xxvii	Oyster and Mussel Fisheries Orders Confirmation Act 1870 (No. 2)	The whole act.
34 & 35 Vict. c. ii	Oyster and Mussel Fisheries Order Confirmation Act 1871	The whole act.
35 & 36 Vict. c. i	Oyster and Mussel Fisheries Orders Confirmation Act 1872	Greshernish Fishery Order 1872.
51 & 52 Vict. c. clxvi	Oyster and Mussel Fisheries (West Loch Tarbert) Order Confirmation Act 1888	The whole act.
54 & 55 Vict. c. xxvii	Oyster and Mussel Fishery (Loch Sween) Order Confirmation Act 1891	The whole act.
56 & 57 Vict. c. cv	Oyster and Mussel Fishery (Loch Creran) Order Confirmation Act 1893	The whole act.
57 & 58 Vict. c. li	Mussel Fishery (Cockenzie) Order Confirmation Act 1894	The whole act.
10 Edw. 7 & 1 Geo. 5. c. cxxxii	Oyster and Mussel Fishery (Bay of Firth) Order Confirmation Act 1910	The whole act.
Group 8 – Other Repeals
46 & 47 Vict. c. xxxvii	Faculty of Procurators in Paisley Act 1883	The whole act.
1 & 2 Geo. 6. c. iv	Empire Exhibition (Scotland) Order Confirmation Act 1937	The whole act.
11 & 12 Geo. 6. c. ix	Church of Scotland Trust (Amendment) Order Confirmation Act 1948	The whole act.
14 Geo. 6. c. xxvi	Merchants House of Glasgow (Crematorium) Order Confirmation Act 1950	The whole act.
1968 c. i	Airdrie Court House Commissioners (Dissolution) Order Confirmation Act 1968	The whole act.
1974 c. vii	Greenock Corporation Order Confirmation Act 1974	The whole act.
1977 c. xxi	Aberdeen Shoemakers Incorporation Order Confirmation Act 1977	The whole act.
1979 c. iii	Solicitors in the Supreme Courts of Scotland (Amendment) Order Confirmation Act 1979	The whole act.
1979 c. xxi	Scots Episcopal Fund Order Confirmation Act 1979	The whole act.
1985 c. xxxvi	Church of Scotland Trust (Amendment) Order Confirmation Act 1985	The whole act.

==== Part VIII: Slave Trade Acts ====
Slave Trade Acts
Citation	Short title	Extent of repeal
5 Geo. 4. c. 113	Slave Trade Act 1824	Sections 3 to 9.
5 Geo. 4. c. 113	Slave Trade Act 1824	Section 12.
5 Geo. 4. c. 113	Slave Trade Act 1824	Sections 39 and 40.
5 Geo. 4. c. 113	Slave Trade Act 1824	Section 47.
3 & 4 Will. 4. c. 73	Slavery Abolition Act 1833	The whole act.
6 & 7 Vict. c. 98	Slave Trade Act 1843	In section 1, the words "and of this present Act" and "or by this present Act,".
6 & 7 Vict. c. 98	Slave Trade Act 1843	Section 4.
27 & 28 Vict. c. 24	Naval Agency and Distribution Act 1864	In section 12, the words "In case of any seizure or capture under any Act relating to the abolition of the slave trade:".
36 & 37 Vict. c. 88	Slave Trade Act 1873	In section 2— (a) the definitions of "British possession" and "foreign state"; (b) from the definition of "Vice-Admiralty Court" onwards.
36 & 37 Vict. c. 88	Slave Trade Act 1873	In section 3— (a) the words in brackets commencing "subject in the case"; (b) in paragraph (a), the words from "and for any commander" to the end; (c) in paragraph (b), the words from "and for any commander" to the end; (d) the words from "for adjudication" to the end.
36 & 37 Vict. c. 88	Slave Trade Act 1873	Sections 4 to 16.
36 & 37 Vict. c. 88	Slave Trade Act 1873	Section 17 from "in like manner" onwards.
36 & 37 Vict. c. 88	Slave Trade Act 1873	Sections 18 to 23.
36 & 37 Vict. c. 88	Slave Trade Act 1873	In section 24, the words from "and any enactments" to "by this Act;".
36 & 37 Vict. c. 88	Slave Trade Act 1873	Section 25.
36 & 37 Vict. c. 88	Slave Trade Act 1873	In section 26, the words from ", either in Her Majesty's dominions" to "has jurisdiction"; and the last paragraph.
36 & 37 Vict. c. 88	Slave Trade Act 1873	Sections 28 and 29.
36 & 37 Vict. c. 88	Slave Trade Act 1873	Schedule 1.
53 & 54 Vict. c. 27	Colonial Courts of Admiralty Act 1890	In paragraph (b) of the proviso to section 2, the words "and under the Slave Trade Act 1873," and "or the slave trade".
53 & 54 Vict. c. 27	Colonial Courts of Admiralty Act 1890	In paragraph (a) of the proviso to section 9(2), the words "to the slave trade,".
53 & 54 Vict. c. 27	Colonial Courts of Admiralty Act 1890	Section 13.
15 & 16 Geo. 5. c. 86	Criminal Justice Act 1925	Section 11(3).
1967 c. 18 (N.I.)	Criminal Law Act (Northern Ireland) 1967	In Schedule 1, paragraph 7(a).
1971 c. 23	Courts Act 1971	In Schedule 8, paragraph 8.
1978 c. 23	Judicature (Northern Ireland) Act 1978	In Part II of Schedule 5, the entry relating to the Slave Trade Act 1843.
1995 c. 21	Merchant Shipping Act 1995	In Schedule 13, paragraph 4.

==== Part IX: Statutes ====
Statutes
Citation	Short title	Extent of repeal
Group 1 – Statute Law Revision Acts
24 & 25 Vict. c. 101	Statute Law Revision Act 1861	The whole act.
35 & 36 Vict. c. 97	Statute Law Revision Act 1872 (No. 2)	The whole act.
37 & 38 Vict. c. 96	Statute Law Revision Act 1874 (No. 2)	The whole act.
41 & 42 Vict. c. 79	Statute Law Revision Act 1878	The whole act.
55 & 56 Vict. c. 19	Statute Law Revision Act 1892	The whole act.
56 & 57 Vict. c. 14	Statute Law Revision Act 1893	Section 1.
56 & 57 Vict. c. 54	Statute Law Revision (No. 2) Act 1893	The whole act.
61 & 62 Vict. c. 22	Statute Law Revision Act 1898	The whole act.
8 Edw. 7. c. 49	Statute Law Revision Act 1908	The whole act.
14 Geo. 6. c. 6	Statute Law Revision Act 1950	Section 3(2).
2 & 3 Eliz. 2. c. 5	Statute Law Revision Act 1953	Section 1.
1973 c. 55	Statute Law Revision (Northern Ireland) Act 1973	Section 1.
1973 c. 55	Statute Law Revision (Northern Ireland) Act 1973	The Schedule.
1976 c. 12	Statute Law Revision (Northern Ireland) Act 1976	The whole act.
1980 c. 59	Statute Law Revision (Northern Ireland) Act 1980	The whole act.
Group 2 – Statute Law (Repeals) Acts
1969 c. 52	Statute Law (Repeals) Act 1969	Section 1.
1969 c. 52	Statute Law (Repeals) Act 1969	Section 2(3).
1969 c. 52	Statute Law (Repeals) Act 1969	In section 5(1), the words "and so much of this Act as repeals the enactments mentioned in Parts III and IV of the Schedule."
1969 c. 52	Statute Law (Repeals) Act 1969	Section 6.
1969 c. 52	Statute Law (Repeals) Act 1969	The Schedule.
1971 c. 52	Statute Law (Repeals) Act 1971	The whole act.
1973 c. 39	Statute Law (Repeals) Act 1973	In section 2(1), the words ", except as provided by paragraph 2(2) of Schedule 2 to this Act".
1973 c. 39	Statute Law (Repeals) Act 1973	In section 2(2), the words from "or the Isle of Man" to the end.
1973 c. 39	Statute Law (Repeals) Act 1973	Schedule 1 except Parts II, VI and XI and the savings specified at the end of those Parts.
1973 c. 39	Statute Law (Repeals) Act 1973	In Schedule 2, paragraph 2.
1974 c. 22	Statute Law (Repeals) Act 1974	In section 3(2), the words "or the Isle of Man".
1974 c. 22	Statute Law (Repeals) Act 1974	The Schedule except Parts III, VI and VII and the savings specified at the end of those Parts.
1975 c. 10	Statute Law (Repeals) Act 1975	Section 1(1) and (3).
1975 c. 10	Statute Law (Repeals) Act 1975	Section 2(2).
1975 c. 10	Statute Law (Repeals) Act 1975	The Schedule.
1976 c. 16	Statute Law (Repeals) Act 1976	Section 1(1).
1976 c. 16	Statute Law (Repeals) Act 1976	Section 2(3).
1976 c. 16	Statute Law (Repeals) Act 1976	In section 3(2), the words from "or the Isle of Man" to the end.
1976 c. 16	Statute Law (Repeals) Act 1976	Schedule 1.
1977 c. 18	Statute Law (Repeals) Act 1977	Section 1(1).
1977 c. 18	Statute Law (Repeals) Act 1977	Section 4(2).
1977 c. 18	Statute Law (Repeals) Act 1977	In section 4(3), the words from "or the Isle of Man" to the end.
1977 c. 18	Statute Law (Repeals) Act 1977	Schedule 1.
1977 c. 18	Statute Law (Repeals) Act 1977	In Schedule 2, the entries relating to the Highways Act 1959 and the Criminal Justice (Scotland) Act 1963.
1978 c. 45	Statute Law (Repeals) Act 1978	Section 1(1).
1978 c. 45	Statute Law (Repeals) Act 1978	In section 3(2), the words "or the Isle of Man".
1978 c. 45	Statute Law (Repeals) Act 1978	Schedule 1.

==== Part X: Miscellaneous ====
Miscellaneous
Citation	Short title	Description	Extent of repeal
Group 1 – Stannaries
32 & 33 Vict. c. 19	Stannaries Act 1869	Stannaries Act 1869.	The whole act.
50 & 51 Vict. c. 43	Stannaries Act 1887	Stannaries Act 1887.	The whole act.
53 & 54 Vict. c. 39	Partnership Act 1890	Partnership Act 1890.	In section 1(2), the words "; or (c) A company engaged in working mines within and subject to the jurisdiction of the Stannaries".
53 & 54 Vict. c. 39	Partnership Act 1890	Partnership Act 1890.	Section 23(4).
Group 2 – Sea Fish
46 & 47 Vict. c. 22	Sea Fisheries Act 1883	Sea Fisheries Act 1883.	The whole act.
SR&O, 8 February 1890	Order in Council applying the Sea Fisheries Act 1883 to the International Convention of 1 February 1889	Order in Council applying the Sea Fisheries Act 1883 to the International Convention of 1 February 1889.	The whole order.
SR&O 1903/214	Order in Council applying the Sea Fisheries Act 1883 to the United Kingdom–Denmark Convention of 24 June 1901	Order in Council applying the Sea Fisheries Act 1883 to the United Kingdom–Denmark Convention of 24 June 1901.	The whole order.
1968 c. 77	Sea Fisheries Act 1968	Sea Fisheries Act 1968.	Section 22(6).
1976 c. 86	Fishery Limits Act 1976	Fishery Limits Act 1976.	In Schedule 2, paragraph 5.
1987 c. 18	Debtors (Scotland) Act 1987	Debtors (Scotland) Act 1987.	In Schedule 6, paragraph 9.
Group 3 – Sewers Support
46 & 47 Vict. c. 37	Public Health Act 1875 (Support of Sewers) Amendment Act 1883	Public Health Act 1875 (Support of Sewers) Amendment Act 1883.	The whole act.
1989 c. 15	Water Act 1989	Water Act 1989.	In Schedule 25, paragraph 3.
1989 c. 15	Water Act 1989	Water Act 1989.	In Schedule 26, paragraph 46.
1991 c. 56	Water Industry Act 1991	Water Industry Act 1991.	Section 97(6).
Group 4 – Agricultural Research
4 & 5 Eliz. 2. c. 28	Agricultural Research Act 1956	Agricultural Research Act 1956.	The whole act.
9 & 10 Eliz. 2. c. 9	Agricultural Research etc. (Pensions) Act 1961	Agricultural Research etc. (Pensions) Act 1961.	In section 1(1)— (a) the words from "The Agricultural Research Council" to "schemes, and"; (b) paragraph (a).
9 & 10 Eliz. 2. c. 9	Agricultural Research etc. (Pensions) Act 1961	Agricultural Research etc. (Pensions) Act 1961.	Section 1(3).
9 & 10 Eliz. 2. c. 9	Agricultural Research etc. (Pensions) Act 1961	Agricultural Research etc. (Pensions) Act 1961.	In section 2(1), from "and may be cited" to the end.
1965 c. 4	Science and Technology Act 1965	Science and Technology Act 1965.	In section 1(1)(a), the words "the Agricultural Research Council and".
1965 c. 4	Science and Technology Act 1965	Science and Technology Act 1965.	In section 2(4), the words "and the Agricultural Research Council" and the words from "and the Agricultural Research Fund" to "maintained".
1965 c. 4	Science and Technology Act 1965	Science and Technology Act 1965.	In section 2(5), the words "the Agricultural Research Council and".
Group 5 – General Repeals
25 Hen. 8. c. 34	Wolfe's Attainder Act 1533	An Acte concernyng the attaynder of John Wolff his wyffe and others.	The whole act as it applies to the Isle of Man.
9 Geo. 1. c. 17	Attainder of Bishop of Rochester Act 1722	An Act to inflict Pains and Penalties on Francis Lord Bishop of Rochester.	The whole act as it applies to the Isle of Man.
7 Ann. c. 27 (Note: This is the citation in The Statutes of the Realm.)	Morrison's Haven and Fort, East Lothian Act 1708	Morrison's Haven and Fort, East Lothian Act 1708.	The whole act.
29 Geo. 3. c. 42	Cockburnspath Bridge, Berwick Act 1789	Cockburnspath Bridge, Berwick Act 1789.	The whole act.
6 & 7 Vict. c. 90	Public Notaries Act 1843	Public Notaries Act 1843.	The whole act as it applies to the Isle of Man.
7 & 8 Geo. 5. c. 21	Venereal Disease Act 1917	Venereal Disease Act 1917.	The whole act.
19 & 20 Geo. 5. c. 29	Government Annuities Act 1929	Government Annuities Act 1929.	In sections 32(4), 62(3) and 62(4), the word "Scotland,".
26 Geo. 5 & 1 Edw. 8. c. 2	Government of India Act 1935	Government of India Act 1935.	The whole act.
9 & 10 Geo. 6. c. 18	Statutory Orders (Special Procedure) Act 1945	Statutory Orders (Special Procedure) Act 1945.	Section 8(2) as it applies to Scotland.
10 & 11 Geo. 6. c. 30	Indian Independence Act 1947	Indian Independence Act 1947.	Section 18(2).
1964 c. 16	Industrial Training Act 1964	Industrial Training Act 1964.	Section 16.
1969 c. 48	Post Office Act 1969	Post Office Act 1969.	Section 113.
1985 c. 68	Housing Act 1985	Housing Act 1985.	Section 173.
1985 c. 68	Housing Act 1985	Housing Act 1985.	Section 174(b) and the preceding "and".
1993 c. 11	Clean Air Act 1993	Clean Air Act 1993.	In section 30(4), the words "and (3)".
1993 c. 50	Statute Law (Repeals) Act 1993	Statute Law (Repeals) Act 1993.	In section 3(3), the words "the Isle of Man,".
1994 c. 19	Local Government (Wales) Act 1994	Local Government (Wales) Act 1994.	In Schedule 9, paragraph 17(1), the words "in paragraph (b) at the beginning insert "in England" and".
1994 c. 19	Local Government (Wales) Act 1994	Local Government (Wales) Act 1994.	In Schedule 16, paragraphs 11, 40(2)(b), 57(6), 67, 70 and 93.

=== Slave Trade Acts ===
The Slavery Abolition Act 1833 (3 & 4 Will. 4. c. 73) was entirely repealed. Despite its repeal, slavery remains illegal because the act only applied to the British Empire, as it was already illegal in Britain itself at the time of its passage due to legal precedents set by court cases like Somerset v Stewart and Knight v Wedderburn, a state of law that carried over into the United Kingdom. Sections of the Slave Trade Act 1824 (5 Geo. 4. c. 113), Slave Trade Act 1843 (6 & 7 Vict. c. 98), and Slave Trade Act 1873 (36 & 37 Vict. c. 88) that prohibit and criminalise slavery also remain in force. More recently, the Human Rights Act 1998 incorporated Article 4 of the European Convention on Human Rights, which prohibits holding people as slaves, into British law; additionally, the Modern Slavery Act 2015 also independently provides for the penalisation and prosecution of slavery.

== Subsequent developments ==
Paragraph 3 of schedule 2 to the act was repealed by section 109(3) of, and schedule 10 to the Courts Act 2003, which came into force on 1 April 2005.

== See also ==
- Statute Law (Repeals) Act
