= Death recorded =

19th-century British legal loophole

In nineteenth-century British law many crimes were punishable by death, but from 1823, the term "death recorded" was used in cases where the judge wished to record a sentence of death – as legally required – while at the same time indicating his intention to pardon the convict or commute the sentence.

== History ==
Royal pardons for capital punishment had become routine at the time for most common crimes. Under the Judgment of Death Act 1823, a "death recorded" sentence allowed the judge to meet common law sentencing precedent, while avoiding being mocked by the sentenced, or the public, who realised an actual death penalty sentence was likely to be overridden. As a death sentence had to be delivered orally in court by the judge before a criminal's execution could take place, a written death recorded sentence did not, in practice, represent the death penalty. The sentence became much less common after the Criminal Law Consolidation Acts 1861 greatly reduced the number of capital offences.

A definition of the term appears in early editions of Ebenezer Cobham Brewer's Dictionary of Phrase and Fable.

The number of offences for which death was nominally the sentence, and the sentence of death being recorded, were criticized at the time of usage both for being capriciously cruel and for uncertainty of actual punishment:

If all the persons, who receive sentence of death at the Old Bailey, were actually to pass into the hands of the executioner, the feelings of the people would not tolerate the repeated exhibitions of the wholesale work of blood .... What a number of convicts, too, have the sentence of death recorded against them at the several Assizes, who, as a matter of course, never suffer the last punishment of the law! ... If death ought not to be inflicted – if, in fact, it dare not be inflicted on the greater number of those to whom our laws afford it, is not the solemn passing of the sentence, and the recording it in open Court, and in the face of the people, a mockery of retributive justice ...?

— Morning Herald, General Character of the Criminal Code (15 March 1830)

A misunderstanding of the term led Naomi Wolf, in her 2019 book Outrages: Sex, Censorship, and the Criminalization of Love, to incorrectly claim that there had been a large number of executions for homosexuality in mid-19th-century England. This claim was based on her misreading proceedings of the Old Bailey, and the use of "death recorded" in these records.

== See also ==
- Death sentence with reprieve - similar practice in Mainland China and Indonesia
