= Prison Act 1865 =

Act of the Parliament of the United Kingdom

Prison Act 1865 (Note: Section 1.)
- Act of Parliament
- Parliament of the United Kingdom
- Long title: An Act to consolidate and amend the Law relating to Prisons.
- Citation: 28 & 29 Vict. c. 126
- Introduced by: Thomas Baring MP (Commons)
- Territorial extent: England and Wales (Note: Section 3.)

Dates
- Royal assent: 6 July 1865
- Commencement: 1 February 1866 (Note: Section 2.)
- Repealed: 1 October 1952

Other legislation
- Amends: See § Repealed enactments
- Repeals/revokes: See § Repealed enactments
- Amended by: Prisons Act 1866; Prison Act 1877; Public Authorities Protection Act 1893; Local Government Act 1933; Criminal Justice Act 1948; Statute Law Revision Act 1950
- Repealed by: Prison Act 1952

Status: Repealed

Text of statute as originally enacted

The Prison Act 1865 (28 & 29 Vict. c. 126) was an act of the Parliament of the United Kingdom that consolidated and amended the law relating to prisons in England.

== Passage ==
Leave to bring in the Prisons Bill to the House of Commons was granted to the home secretary, Sir George Grey and the under-secretary of state for the home department, Thomas Baring MP on 13 February 1865. The bill had its first reading in the House of Commons on 13 February 1865, presented by the under-secretary of state for the home department, Thomas Baring MP. The bill had its second reading in the House of Commons on 8 March 1865 and was committed to a select committee, which was nominated on 13 March 1865 with a quorum of 5 and the power to send for "persons, papers, and records".

Name	Party
Sir George Grey	Liberal
Charles Adderley	Conservative
William Wither Bramston Beach	Conservative
J. W. Henley	Conservative
J. T. Hibbert	Liberal
Gathorne Hardy	Conservative
Robert Hanbury	Liberal
Lord Edward Fitzalan-Howard	Liberal
George Ward Hunt	Conservative
Sir William Miles	Conservative
Sir John Pakington	Conservative
Joseph Christopher Ewart	Liberal
John Walter	Liberal
John Perry-Watlington	Conservative
Samuel Whitbread	Liberal

The committee met on 30 May 1865 and 9 June 1865 and reported on 9 June 1865, with amendments. The amended bill was considered on 12 June 1865, with amendments. The amended bill had its third reading in the House of Commons on 13 June 1865 and passed, without amendments.

The bill had its first reading in the House of Lords on 13 June 1865. The bill had its second reading in the House of Lords on 20 June 1865 and was committed to a committee of the whole house, which met on 27 June 1865 and reported on 29 June 1865, with amendments. The amended bill had its third reading in the House of Lords on 30 June 1865 and passed, with amendments.

The amended bill was considered and agreed to by the House of Commons on 30 June 1865, with amendments. The amended bill was considered and agreed to by the House of Lords on 5 July 1865.

The bill was granted royal assent on 6 July 1865.

== Provisions ==
=== Short title, commencement and extent ===
Section 1 of the act provided that the act may be cited as "The Prison Act, 1865".

Section 2 of the act provided that the act would come into force on 1 February 1866.

Section 3 of the act provided that the act would not extend to Scotland or Ireland.

=== Repealed enactments ===
Section 73 of the act repealed 18 enactments, listed in the third schedule to the act.

Section 74 of the act provided that the repeals would not affect anything done under those repealed enactments.

Citation	Short title	Description	Extent of repeal
4 Geo. 4. c. 64	Gaols Act 1823	An Act for consolidating and amending the Laws relating to the building, repairing, and regulating of certain Gaols and Houses of Correction in England and Wales.	The whole act.
5 Geo. 4. c. 85	Gaols, etc. (England) Act 1824	An Act for amending an Act of the last Session of Parliament relating to the building, repairing, and enlarging of certain Gaols and Houses of Correction, and for procuring Information as to the State of all other Gaols and Houses of Correction in England and Wales.	The whole act.
6 Geo. 4. c. 40	Mortgages of County Rates Act 1825	An Act to enable Justices of the Peace in England in certain Cases to borrow Money on Mortgage of the Rate of the City, Riding, or Place for which such Justices shall be then acting.	The whole act.
7 Geo. 4. c. 18	Prisons (England) Act 1826	An Act to authorize the Disposal of unnecessary Prisons in England.	The whole act.
5 & 6 Will. 4. c. 38	Prisons Act 1835	An Act for effecting greater Uniformity of Practice in the Government of the several Prisons in England and Wales, and for appointing Inspectors of Prisons in Great Britain.	Secs. 2, 5, 6, 11, and 12.
5 & 6 Will. 4. c. 76	Municipal Corporations Act 1835	An Act to provide for the Regulation of Municipal Corporations in England and Wales.	Secs. 115 and 116.
6 & 7 Will. 4. c. 105	Administration of Justice in Certain Boroughs Act 1836	An Act for the better Administration of Justice in certain Boroughs.	Secs. 1 and 2.
1 Vict. c. 78.	Municipal Corporations (England) Act 1837	An Act to amend an Act for the Regulation of Municipal Corporations in England and Wales.	Secs. 37 and 38.
2 & 3 Vict. c. 56	Prisons Act 1839	An Act for the better ordering of Prisons	The whole Act, except Secs. 18, 19, 20, and 21, and except Secs. 22 and 23 so far as they relate to Prisons or Places of Confinement to which this Act does not extend.
3 & 4 Vict. c. 25	Prisons Act 1840	An Act to amend the Act for the better ordering of Prisons.	The whole act.
5 & 6 Vict. c. 53	District Courts and Prisons Act 1842	An Act to encourage the Establishment of District Prisons.	The whole act.
5 & 6 Vict. c. 98	Prisons Act 1842	An Act to amend the Law relating to Prisons.	Secs. 1, 2, 4, 8, 9, 18, 25, and 30, so far as the said Sections relate to Prisons within the Provisions of this Act.
7 & 8 Vict. c. 50	District Courts and Prisons Act 1844	An Act to extend the Powers of the Act for encouraging the Establishment of District Courts and Prisons.	The whole act.
7 & 8 Vict. c. 93	Arbitrations Act 1844	An Act to enable Barristers to arbitrate between Counties and Boroughs to submit a Special Case to the Superior Courts.	The whole act.
11 & 12 Vict. c. 39	Prisons Act 1848	An Act to facilitate the raising of Money by Corporate Bodies for building or repairing Prisons.	The whole act.
16 & 17 Vict. c. 43	Convicted Prisoners Removal, etc. Act 1853	An Act for enabling the Justices of Counties to contract in certain Cases for the Maintenance and Confinement of convicted Prisoners in the Gaols of adjoining Counties.	The whole act.
25 & 26 Vict. c. 44	Discharged Prisoners' Aid Act 1862	An Act to amend the Law relating to the giving of Aid to discharged Prisoners.	Secs. 2 and 3.
26 & 27 Vict. c. 79	Prison Ministers Act 1863	An Act for the Amendment of the Law relating to the religious Instruction of Prisoners in County and Borough Prisons in England and Scotland.	So much of Section 3 as is inconsistent with the Provisions of this Act, and the whole of Section 5, but so far only as relates to Prisons to which this Act applies.

== Subsequent developments ==
Sections 49 and 50 of the act were repealed by section 2 of, and the schedule to, the Public Authorities Protection Act 1893 (56 & 57 Vict. c. 61), which came into force on 1 January 1894.

Section 20 of the act was repealed by section 1(1) of, and the first schedule to, the Statute Law Revision Act 1950 (14 Geo. 6. c. 6), which came into force on 23 May 1950.

The whole act was repealed by section 54(2) of, and part I of the fourth schedule to, the Prison Act 1952 (15 & 16 Geo. 6 & 1 Eliz. 2. c. 52), which came into force on 1 October 1952.
