= Certain Mutinous Crews Act 1797 =

Act of the Parliament of Great Britain

- Act of Parliament
- Parliament of Great Britain
- Long title: An Act for more effectually restraining Intercourse with the Crews of certain of His Majesty's Ships now in a State of Mutiny and Rebellion and for the more effectual Suppression of such Mutiny and Rebellion.
- Citation: 37 Geo. 3. c. 71
- Territorial extent: Great Britain

Dates
- Royal assent: 6 June 1797
- Commencement: 6 June 1797 (Note: The Acts of Parliament (Commencement) Act 1793.)
- Repealed: 21 August 1871
Other legislation
Repealed by	Statute Law Revision Act 1871
Relates to	Incitement to Mutiny Act 1797

Status: Repealed

Text of statute as originally enacted

The Certain Mutinous Crews Act 1797 (37 Geo. 3. c. 71) was an act of the Parliament of Great Britain. The act was passed in the aftermath of the Spithead and Nore mutinies and declared that those mutineers who refused to surrender were rebels and aimed to restrict intercourse with the mutinous ships upon pain of death.

== Subsequent developments ==
The whole act was repealed by section 1 of, and the schedule to, the Statute Law Revision Act 1871 (34 & 35 Vict. c. 116), which came into force on 21 August 1871.
