= Prisons Act 1866 =

Act of the Parliament of the United Kingdom

Prisons Act 1866 (Note: Section 5.)
- Act of Parliament
- Parliament of the United Kingdom
- Long title: An Act for the Amendment of the Laws relating to Prisons.
- Citation: 29 & 30 Vict. c. 100
- Introduced by: Sir Robert Collier MP (Commons)
- Territorial extent: United Kingdom

Dates
- Royal assent: 10 August 1866
- Commencement: 10 August 1866 (Note: The Acts of Parliament (Commencement) Act 1793.)
- Repealed: 9 June 1893
Other legislation
Amends	See § Repealed enactments
Repeals/revokes	See § Repealed enactments
Amended by	Prison Act 1865
Repealed by	Statute Law Revision Act 1893
Relates to	Assizes Act 1833

Status: Repealed

Text of statute as originally enacted

The Prisons Act 1866 (29 & 30 Vict. c. 100) was an act of the Parliament of the United Kingdom that amended the Prison Act 1865 (28 & 29 Vict. c. 126).

== Passage ==
Leave to bring in the Prisons Bill to the House of Commons was granted to the home secretary, Spencer Horatio Walpole MP and the solicitor general, Sir Robert Collier MP on 28 July 1866. The bill had its first reading in the House of Commons on 28 July 1866, presented by the solicitor general, Sir Robert Collier MP. The bill had its second reading in the House of Commons on 31 July 1866 and was committed to a committee of the whole house, which met and reported on 31 July 1866, without amendments. The bill had its third reading in the House of Commons on 1 August 1866 and passed, without amendments.

The bill had its first reading in the House of Lords on 2 August 1866. The bill had its second reading in the House of Lords on 3 August 1866 and was committed to a committee of the whole house, which met and reported on 6 August 1866, without amendments. The bill had its third reading in the House of Lords on 7 August 1866 and passed, without amendments.

The bill was granted royal assent on 10 August 1866.

== Subsequent developments ==
The whole act was repealed by section 1 of, and the schedule to, the Statute Law Revision Act 1893 (56 & 57 Vict. c. 14), which came into force on 9 June 1893.
