= Gaols Act 1823 =

Act of the Parliament of the United Kingdom to reform prisons

- Act of Parliament
- Parliament of the United Kingdom
- Long title: An Act for consolidating and amending the Laws relating to the building, repairing and regulating of certain Gaols and Houses of Correction in England and Wales.
- Citation: 4 Geo. 4. c. 64
- Introduced by: Thomas Courtenay MP (Commons)
- Territorial extent: England and Wales (Note: Preamble.)

Dates
- Royal assent: 10 July 1823
- Commencement: 1 September 1823 (Note: Section 78.)
- Repealed: 1 February 1866
Other legislation
Amends	See § Repealed enactments
Repeals/revokes	See § Repealed enactments
Amended by	Gaols, etc. (England) Act 1824
Repealed by	Prison Act 1865
Relates to	Judgement of Death Act 1823; Prisons Act 1835; Punishment of Offences Act 1837; Statute Law Revision Act 1863

Status: Repealed

Text of statute as originally enacted

The Gaols Act 1823 (4 Geo. 4. c. 64), also known as the Gaol Act 1823, the Gaols, etc. (England) Act 1823, the Prison Act 1823, or the Prisons Act 1823, was an act of the Parliament of the United Kingdom to reform prisons.

The act mandated sex segregated prisons and female warders for female prisoners across the whole of the then British Empire.

== Passage ==
Leave to bring in the Prisons Bill to the House of Commons was granted to Thomas Courtenay MP, the home secretary, Robert Peel MP and the solicitor general, Sir John Copley MP on 7 March 1823. The bill had its first reading in the House of Commons on 10 March 1823, presented by Thomas Courtenay MP. The bill had its second reading in the House of Commons on 14 March 1823 and was committed to a committee of the whole house, which met on 17 March 1823 and reported on 22 March 1823, with amendments. The amended bill had its third reading in the House of Commons on 25 and passed, with amendments.

The bill had its first reading in the House of Lords on 26 March 1823. The bill had its second reading in the House of Lords on 2 May 1823 and was committed to a select committee,

Name
Henry Somerset, 7th Duke of Beaufort
Henry Petty-Fitzmaurice, 3rd Marquess of Lansdowne
John Pratt, 1st Marquess Camden
Cropley Ashley-Cooper, 6th Earl of Shaftesbury
George Wyndham, 3rd Earl of Egremont
Charles Chetwynd-Talbot, 2nd Earl Talbot
Henry Lascelles, 2nd Earl of Harewood
John Cust, 1st Earl Brownlow
Henry Addington, 1st Viscount Sidmouth
Henry Ryder
Thomas Brand, 20th Baron Dacre
George Rice, 3rd Baron Dynevor
Edward Harbord, 3rd Baron Suffield
George Eden, 1st Earl of Auckland
George Gough-Calthorpe, 3rd Baron Calthorpe
Thomas Powys, 2nd Baron Lilford

The committee reported on 10 June 1823, with amendments. The amended bill was reported to a committee of the whole house, which met on 13 June 1823 and reported on 17 June 1823, with amendments. The amended bill had its third reading in the House of Lords on 18 June 1823 and passed, without amendments.

The amended bill was considered and agreed to by the House of Commons on 7 July 1823 with amendments. The amended bill was considered and agreed to by the House of Lords on 9 July 1823.

The bill was granted royal assent on 10 July 1823.

== Overview ==
John Howard FRS, for whom the Howard League for Penal Reform is named, was a key penal reformer of the 18th century. In 1785 he and Jeremiah Fitzpatrick observed the sexual degradation of women and girls in Wicklow Gaol.

In 1813 Elizabeth Fry was prompted by a French-American Quaker, Stephen Grellet, who advocated sex segregation of prisons in Russia on his visit to the then Russian Empire, now Russia and Ukraine. She visited and was appalled at the conditions of women and girls at Newgate Prison. She was the first woman to give evidence to a House of Commons select committee about the sexual degradation of women and girls at the hands of both male prisoners and warders. This led directly to the Gaols Act 1823, which was introduced and supported by the Home Secretary Robert Peel. Her letters were collected together by her daughters into a journal of her life (the custom among Quakers) "The Life of Elizabeth Fry".

In particular Elizabeth Fry was involved in the amelioration of the conditions of women and girls deported to Australia "in little better than slave ships". It is worth noting that it was not until 1833 that slavery was abolished in the then British Empire, some 10 years after the act and some 20 after her work started.

The act introduced regular visits to prisoners by chaplains; provided for the payment of gaolers, who had previously been paid out of fees that the prisoners themselves were required to pay; stated that female and male prisoners should be kept separated as well as requiring the installation of female wardens to guard female prisoners; and prohibited the use of irons and manacles. Peel's Judgement of Death Act 1823 (4 Geo. 4. c. 48) and four others passed at the same time lifted the death penalty from 130 crimes.

== Provisions ==
=== Repealed enactments ===
Section 1 of the act repealed 23 enactments, listed in that section, "so far as relates to such Gaols or Prisons, or Houses of Correction".

Citation	Short title	Description	Extent of repeal
1 Edw. 3. Stat. 1. c. 7	Appeal by Prisoners	A Statute passed in the First Year of the Reign of King Edward the Third.	As relates to Inquiry to be made of Gaolers, which by Duress compel Prisoners to appeal.
4 Edw. 3. c. 10	Receipt of offenders by sheriffs, etc.	A Statute passed in the Fourth Year of the Reign of the said King Edward the Third.	As relates to Sheriffs and Gaolers receiving Offenders without taking any thing.
14 Edw. 3. Stat. 1. c. 10	Custody of gaols, etc.	A Statute passed in the Fourteenth Year of the Reign of the said King Edward the Third.	As relates to the Punishment of a Gaoler compelling a Prisoner by Duress to become an Approver .
7 Jas. 1. c. 4	Vagabonds Act 1609	An Act passed in the Seventh Year of the Reign of King James the First, intituled An Act for the due Execution of divers Laws and Statutes heretofore made against Rogues, Vagabonds and sturdy Beggars, and other lewd and idle Persons.	As relates to the providing Houses of Correction, to the Appointment, Authority and Allowance of the Governor, and to his accounting to Justices for Persons committed to his Custody.
19 Cha. 2. c. 4	Poor Prisoners Act 1666	An Act passed in the Nineteenth Year of the Reign of King Charles the Second, intituled An Act for the Relief of poor Prisoners, and setting them to work.	As relates to the providing Stocks for setting such Prisoners to work, and to the Removal of Prisoners on occasion of Sickness. I.e., sections 1, 2, 3, 5.
22 & 23 Cha. 2. c. 20	Insolvent Debtors Relief Act 1670	An Act passed in the Twenty second and Twenty third Years of the Reign of the said King Charles the Second, intituled An Act for the Relief and Release of poor distressed Prisoners for Debt.	As relates to Prisoners being allowed to send for Victuals and other Necessaries, and to Fees and Charities, and to the Separation of Felons and Debtors. I.e., sections 10–13.
11 Will. 3. c. 19	Gaols Act 1698	An Act passed in the Eleventh and Twelfth Years of the Reign of King William the Third, intituled An Act to enable Justices of Peace to build and repair Gaols in their respective Counties.	The whole act.
6 Geo. 1. c. 19	Perpetuation of Acts, etc., Act 1719	An Act made in the Sixth Year of the Reign of King George the First.	Any Thing for making perpetual any Act or Acts relating to the building and repairing of County Gaols, to the contrary in anywise notwithstanding.
2 Geo. 2. c. 22	Insolvent Debtors Relief (No. 2) Act 1728	An Act passed in the Second Year of the Reign of King George the Second, intituled An Act for the Relief of Debtors, with respect to the Imprisonment of their Persons.	As relates to Prisoners being allowed by Keepers of Prisons and Gaols to send for Victuals and other Necessaries, and to the taking of Fees, and the making and hanging up Tables thereof, and to Inquiries concerning the same, and to the hearing of Complaints of Extortion against Gaolers, and examining into Gifts and Legacies for the Benefit of poor Prisoners, and hanging up Tables thereof.
14 Geo. 2. c. 33	Bridges Act 1740	An Act passed in the Fourteenth Year of the Reign of the said King George the Second, intituled An Act to supply some Defects in the Laws for repairing and rebuilding County Bridges, for repairing, enlarging, erecting and providing Houses of Correction, and for passing Rogues and Vagabonds.	As relates to repairing, enlarging and building Houses of Correction, and to buying Houses and Lands for that Purpose.
16 Geo. 2. c. 31	Prison (Escape) Act 1742	An Act passed in the Sixteenth Year of the Reign of the said King George the Second, intituled An Act for the farther Punishment of Persons who shall aid or assist Prisoners to attempt to escape out of lawful Custody.	As relates to the Escape of Prisoners from any Gaol or Prison to which this Act shall extend.
17 Geo. 2. c. 5	Justices Commitment Act 1743	An Act passed in the Seventeenth Year of the Reign of the said King George the Second, intituled An Act to amend and make more effectual the Laws relating to Rogues, Vagabonds and other idle and disorderly Persons, and to Houses of Correction.	As relates to the erecting, enlarging and managing of Houses of Correction, and the finding or turning out of Masters of them for Misbehaviour.
24 Geo. 2. c. 40	Sale of Spirits Act 1750	An Act passed in the Twenty fourth Year of the Reign of the said King George the Second (made among other Things for granting an additional Duty upon Spirituous Liquors, and upon Licences for retailing the same, and for repealing an Act of the Twentieth Year of King George the First, made among other Things for more effectually restraining the retailing of distilled Spirituous Liquors).	As relates to the retailing of Spirituous Liquors in Gaols, Prisons or Houses of Correction, to the carrying of Liquors into the same, to the Search for such Liquors, and to the hanging up of a Copy of certain Clauses of the said Act in such Gaols, Prisons or Houses.
32 Geo. 2. c. 28	Debtors Imprisonment Act 1758	An Act passed in the Thirty second Year of the Reign of the said King George the Second, for Relief of Debtors.	With respect to the Imprisonment of their Persons, as relates to Prisoners being allowed to send for Victuals and other Necessaries, and to the settling, signing, reviewing, enrolling and hanging up of Tables of Fees, Rates and Benefactions, and Rules for the Government of Gaols and Prisons.
13 Geo. 3. c. 58	Gaols Act 1772	An Act passed in the Thirteenth Year of the Reign of His late Majesty King George the Third, intituled An Act for providing Clergymen to officiate in Gaols within that Part of Great Britain called England.	The whole act.
14 Geo. 3. c. 59	Health of Prisoners Act 1774	An Act passed in the Fourteenth Year of the Reign of His said late Majesty, intituled An Act for preserving the Health of Prisoners in Gaol, and preventing the Gaol Distemper.	The whole act.
22 Geo. 3. c. 64	Houses of Correction Act 1782	An Act passed in the Twenty second Year of His said late Majesty's Reign, intituled An Act for the amending and rendering more effectual the Laws in being relative to Houses of Correction.	The whole act.
24 Geo. 3. Sess. 2. c. 54	Gaols Act 1784	Two Acts passed in the Twenty fourth Year of His said late Majesty's Reign, the one made to explain and amend the hereinbefore recited Act, made in the Eleventh and Twelfth Years of the Reign of King William the Third.	The whole act.
24 Geo. 3. Sess. 2. c. 55	Houses of Correction Act 1784	Two Acts passed in the Twenty fourth Year of His said late Majesty's Reign, the other made to explain and amend the hereinbefore recited Act of the Twenty second Year of the Reign of His said late Majesty King George the Third.	The whole act.
29 Geo. 3. c. 67	Gaols Act 1789	An Act passed in the Twenty ninth Year of His said late Majesty's Reign, intituled An Act for the more effectual Execution of the Laws respecting Gaols.	The whole act.
31 Geo. 3. c. 46	Gaols Act 1791	An Act passed in the Thirty first Year of His said late Majesty's Reign, intituled An Act for the better regulating of Gaols and other Places of Confinement.	Except only so much of the said Act as relates to the Imprisonment and Employment in Hard Labour in the Common Gaol of the County, of Prisoners sentenced to Transportation, or to whom the Royal Mercy shall be extended on Condition of Transportation
55 Geo. 3. 48	Chaplains in Gaols, etc. (England) Act 1815	An Act passed in the Fifty fifth Year of His said late Majesty's Reign, for enlarging the Powers of the herein- before recited Acts of the Thirteenth and Twenty second Years of His said late Majesty's Reign, for providing Clergymen to officiate in Gaols and Houses of Correction within England and Wales.	The whole act.
58 Geo. 3. c. 32	Houses of Correction (England) Act 1818	An Act passed in the Fifty eighth Year of His said late Majesty's Reign, to amend so much of the said Act of the Fifty fifth Year of His said late Majesty's Reign, as relates to the Salaries of the Clergymen officiating as Chaplains in Houses of Correction.	The whole act.

== Subsequent developments ==
The qualified terms of the repeal led to several acts being repealed by later Statute Law Revision Acts, including:

- Statute Law Revision Act 1861 (24 & 25 Vict. c. 101)
- Statute Law Revision Act 1863 (6 & 27 Vict. c. 125)
- Statute Law Revision Act 1871 (34 & 35 Vict. c. 116)
- Statute Law Revision Act 1873 (36 & 37 Vict. c. 91)

The act was largely ineffective because there were no inspectors to make sure that it was being followed. The Prisons Act 1835 (5 & 6 Will. 4. c. 38) offered a remedy by providing for the appointment of five paid prison inspectors. This helped to stop the exploitation of prisoners.

The whole act was repealed by section 73 of, and the third schedule to, the Prison Act 1865 (28 & 29 Vict. c. 126), which came into force on 1 February 1866.

== See also ==
- Debtor's prison
- English criminal law
- Work house
