= Bloody Code =

English, Welsh and Irish criminal law from around 1700 to 1823

"The Idle 'Prentice Executed at Tyburn", from a 1747 moralising print series by William Hogarth, in which a lazy apprentice gradually falls into crime, murdering for profit and then being executed.

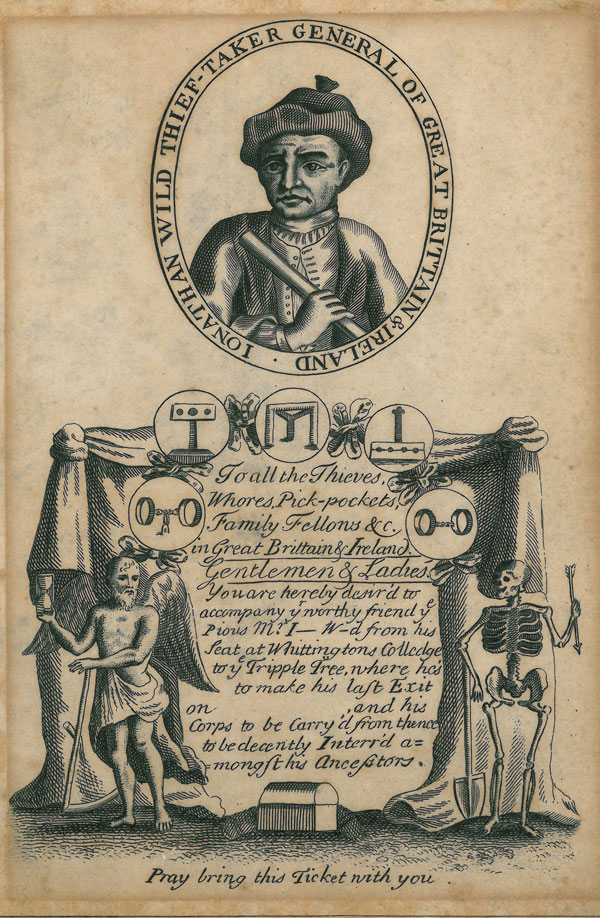
Ticket for the execution of Jonathan Wild, hanged for theft in 1722.

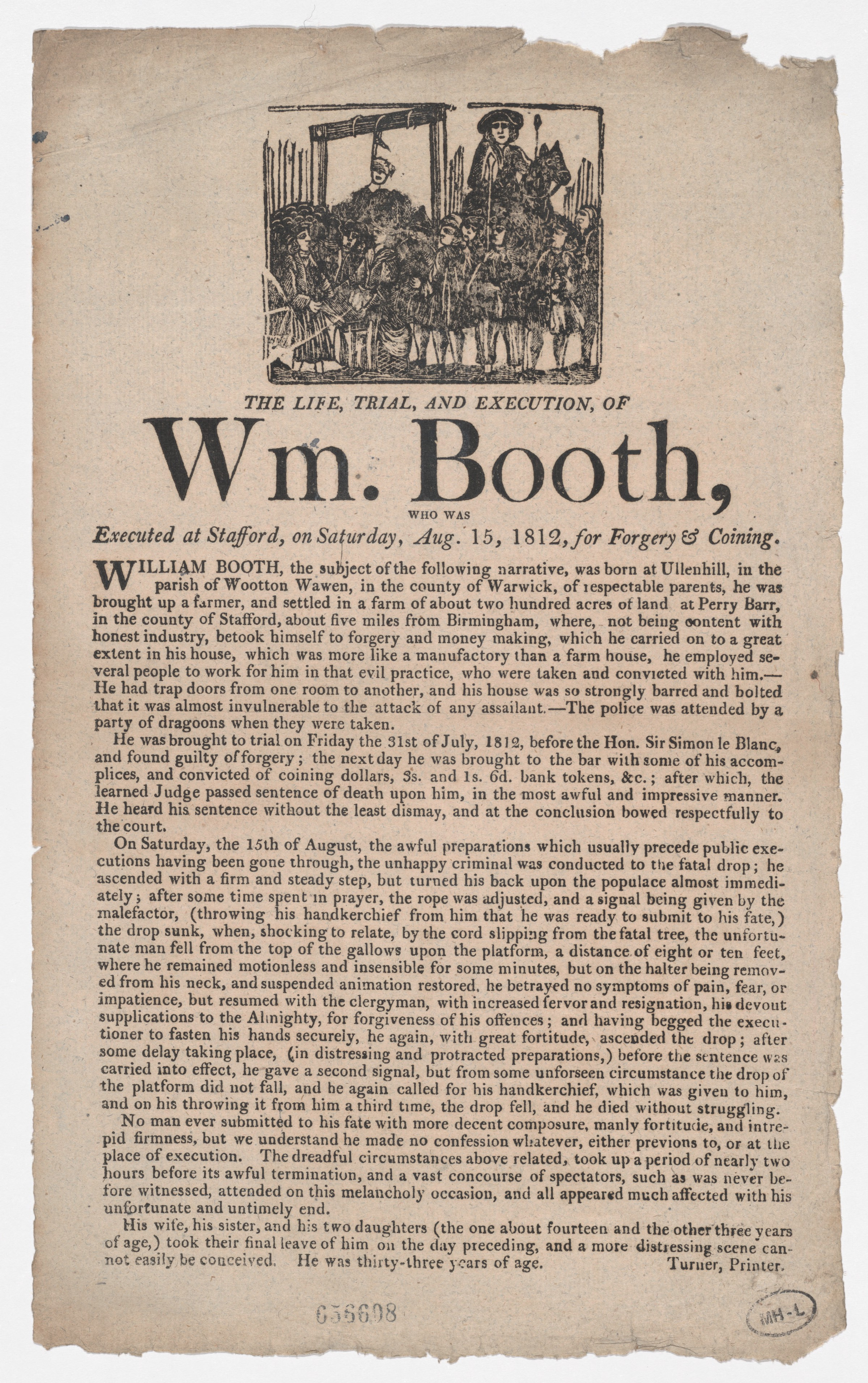
Broadside of 1812, describing the life, crimes and execution of William Booth, for forgery and counterfeiting.

The "Bloody Code" (Welsh: Y Cod Gwaedlyd) was a series of laws in England, Wales and Ireland in the eighteenth and early nineteenth centuries which imposed the death penalty for a wide range of crimes, many of which would be considered minor by later standards. Between 1688 and 1820, the total number of capital crimes in England and Wales grew from about 50 to over 200. Most of the new statutes focused on the protection of property. The most significant component of the Bloody Code was the Black Act 1723, which was originally structured as short-term, emergency legislation but was later extended and expanded.

Paradoxically, the total number of actual executions continued to decrease even as the total number of capital crimes increased. As capital punishment declined, penal transportation with indentured servitude became a more common sentence. In 1785, Australia was deemed suitable for transporting convicts, and over one-third of all criminals convicted between 1788 and 1867 were sent there. The Bloody Code listed 21 categories of capital crimes in the eighteenth century. By 1823, the Judgment of Death Act made the death penalty discretionary for most crimes, and by 1861, the number of capital offences had been reduced to five. The last execution in the United Kingdom took place in 1964, and the death penalty was abolished for various crimes in the following years.

== History ==
In 1689 there were 50 offences on the statute book punishable by death in England and Wales, but that number had almost quadrupled by 1776, and it reached 220 by the end of the century. Most of the new laws introduced during that period were concerned with the defence of property, which some commentators have interpreted as a form of class suppression of the poor by the rich. George Savile, 1st Marquess of Halifax, expressed a contemporary view when he said that "Men are not hanged for stealing horses, but that horses may not be stolen." Grand larceny was one of the crimes that drew the death penalty; it was defined as the theft of goods worth more than 12 pence, a very small sum of money (skilled workers could earn more than this in a single day). As the 18th century proceeded, jurors often deliberately under-assessed the value of stolen goods in order to avoid a mandatory death sentence.

In the Kingdom of Ireland, a subordinate but separate state, a similar "Bloody Code" existed, but there were not as many capital crimes. Notable examples of Irish 'Bloody Code' laws included the Shipwreck and Ship Burning Act 1737, the Malicious Wounding (Chalkers) Act 1773 and the Tumultuous Risings Act 1775, which made (respectively) pillaging shipwrecks, stabbing or cutting another person, and the actions of the Whiteboys, into capital crimes.

=== Penal transportation ===
As the number of capital crimes increased, lawmakers sought a less harsh punishment that might still deter potential offenders. Therefore penal transportation with a term of indentured servitude became a more common punishment. This trend was expanded by the Transportation Act 1717 (16 Geo. 3 c.43), which regulated and subsidised the practice, until its use was suspended by the Criminal Law Act 1776. With the American Colonies in active rebellion, parliament claimed its continuance was "found to be attended with various inconveniences, particularly by depriving this kingdom of many subjects whose labour might be useful to the community, and who, by proper care and correction, might be reclaimed from their evil course." This law would become known as the Hard Labour Act and the Hulks Act for both its purpose and its result.

With the removal of the important transportation alternative to the death penalty, it would in part prompt the use of prisons for punishment and the start of prison building programmes. In 1785 Australia was deemed a suitably desolate place to transport convicts; transportation resumed, now to a specifically planned penal colony, with the departure of the First Fleet in 1787. It has been estimated that over one-third of all criminals convicted between 1788 and 1867 were transported to Australia, including Van Diemen's Land (now Tasmania). Some criminals could escape transportation if they agreed to join the British Army. Jurist William Blackstone said of the Bloody Code:

It is a melancholy truth, that among the variety of actions which men are daily liable to commit, no less than a hundred and sixty have been declared by Act of Parliament to be felonious without benefit of clergy; or, in other words, to be worthy of instant death.

=== Crimes ===
Leon Radzinowicz listed 49 pages of "Capital Statutes of the Eighteenth Century" divided into 21 categories:

1. High treason, including offences against the Protestant succession and the Protestant establishment
2. Other offences against the State
3. Offences against public order, including riot and destruction of flood defences and bridges
4. Offences against the administration of justice
5. Offences against public health
6. Offences against public revenue, including smuggling
7. Petty treason and murder
8. Stabbing, maiming and shooting at any person
9. Rape, forcible abduction and other sexual offences
10. Simple grand larceny and allied offences
11. Burglary and allied offences
12. Larceny from the person
13. Larceny and embezzlement by servants, Post Office employees, clerks and other agents
14. Blackmail
15. Offences by bankrupts
16. Forgery of deeds, bonds, testaments, bills of exchange, stocks, stamps, banknotes, etc.
17. Falsely personating another with intent to defraud
18. Destroying ships to the prejudice of insurance companies
19. Coinage offences
20. Malicious injuries to property, including arson
21. Piracy

== Relaxation of the law ==
In 1823, the Judgement of Death Act 1823 made the death penalty discretionary for all crimes except treason and murder. Gradually during the middle of the nineteenth century the number of capital offences was reduced, and by 1861 was down to five (not counting offences under military law). The last execution in the UK took place in 1964, and the death penalty was legally abolished in the following years for the crimes of:

- Murder, 1969 in England, Wales and Scotland, and 1973 in Northern Ireland
- Arson in royal dockyards, 1971
- Espionage, 1981
- Piracy with violence, September 1998
- Treason, September 1998
- Six military offences, November 1998

Reintroduction of the death penalty under any circumstances was prohibited by treaty (Protocol 13 of the European Convention on Human Rights) in 2004.

== See also ==
- Black Act 1723

== General sources ==
- Radzinowicz, Leon (1948). A History Of English Criminal Law and its Administration. Vol. I: The Movement for Reform. London: Stevens & Sons.
