= Judgment of Death Act 1823 =

Act of the Parliament of the United Kingdom

Judgment of Death Act 1823 (Note: The citation of this act by this short title was authorised by section 1 of, and the first schedule to, the Short Titles Act 1896. Due to the repeal of those provisions it is now authorised by section 19(2) of the Interpretation Act 1978.)
- Act of Parliament
- Parliament of the United Kingdom
- Long title: An Act for enabling Courts to abstain from pronouncing Sentence of Death in certain Capital Felonies.
- Citation: 4 Geo. 4 c. 48
- Territorial extent: England and Wales; Ireland; (Note: Section 3.)

Dates
- Royal assent: 4 July 1823
- Commencement: 4 July 1823 (Note: Section 1.)
- Repealed: England and Wales: 1 January 1971 (Note: The Courts Act 1971 (Commencement) Order 1971 (SI 1971/1151).); Northern Ireland: 13 November 1980; Republic of Ireland: 16 May 1983
Other legislation
Amended by	Statute Law Revision Act 1888; Murder (Abolition of Death Penalty) Act 1965; Criminal Law Act 1967; Northern Ireland (Emergency Provisions) Act 1973
Repealed by	England and Wales: Courts Act 1971; Northern Ireland: Statute Law Revision (Northern Ireland) Act 1980; Republic of Ireland: Statute Law Revision Act 1983
Relates to	Gaols Act 1823

Status: Repealed

Text of statute as originally enacted

The Judgment of Death Act 1823 (4 Geo. 4 c. 48) was an act of the Parliament of the United Kingdom (although it did not apply to Scotland). Passed at a time when there were over 200 offences in English law which carried a mandatory sentence of death, it gave judges the discretion to pass a lesser sentence for the first time. It did not apply to treason or murder. The act required judges to enter a sentence of death on the court record, but then allowed them to commute the sentence to imprisonment.

== Subsequent developments ==
The whole act was repealed for England and Wales by section 56(4) the Courts Act 1971.

The whole act was repealed for the Republic of Ireland by the Statute Law Revision Act 1983.

The whole act was repealed for Northern Ireland by section 1 of, and part IV of the schedule to, the Statute Law Revision (Northern Ireland) Act 1980, which came into force on 13 November 1980. By that time the death penalty in the United Kingdom had essentially ended: it had been abolished for murder in Great Britain in 1965, the last death sentences issued in Northern Ireland were soon commuted to life imprisonment, and no death sentences were subsequently handed down in Great Britain for the crimes that retained it.

== See also ==
- Capital punishment in the United Kingdom
