= Slave Trade Act =

Stock short title used for UK and US legislation

Slave Trade Act is a stock short title used for legislation in the United Kingdom and the United States that relates to the slave trade.

The "See also" section lists other Slave Acts, laws, and international conventions which developed the concept of slavery, and then the resolution and abolition of slavery, including a timeline of when various nations abolished slavery.

== List ==
=== United Kingdom ===
- The Slave Trade Act 1788 (28 Geo. 3. c. 54) (a.k.a. Dolben's Act)
- 47 Geo. 3 Sess. 1. c. 36, sometimes called the Slave Trade Act 1807
- Slave Trade Felony Act 1811 (51 Geo. 3. c. 23)
- The Slave Trade Act 1824 (5 Geo. 4. c. 113)
- The Slave Trade Act 1843 (6 & 7 Vict. c. 98)
- 8 & 9 Vict. c. 122 sometimes called the Aberdeen Act (1845)
- The Slave Trade Act 1873 (36 & 37 Vict. c. 88)
- The Anglo-Egyptian Slave Trade Convention (1877, 1884)
- The Treaty of Jeddah (1927)
- The Modern Slavery Act 2015 (c. 30)

=== United States ===
- The Slave Trade Act of 1794
- The Slave Trade Act of 1800
- Act to prevent the importation of certain persons [slaves] into certain states . . ., 1803
- Act Prohibiting Importation of Slaves, 1807
- The Slave Trade Act of 1818
- 1819 U.S. law, amended in 1820, which impacted the slave trade
- Act for the Government and Protection of Indians, 1850, California
- Act in Relation to Service, 1852, Utah Territory
- Act for the relief of Indian Slaves and Prisoners, 1852, Utah Territory
- Peonage Act of 1867

== See also ==
- Abolition of slavery timeline
- Abolitionism in the United Kingdom
- Abolitionism in the United States
- Slavery in international law
- Slavery in the British Isles
- Slavery in the United States
- Slavery in the colonial history of the United States
- Lyons–Seward Treaty of 1862
- Brussels Conference Act of 1890
- 1921 International Convention for the Suppression of the Traffic in Women and Children (League of Nations)
- 1926 Slavery Convention (League of Nations)
- 1930 Forced Labour Convention of the International Labour Organization
- 1948 Declaration of Human Rights (United Nations)
- 1956 Supplementary Convention on the Abolition of Slavery (United Nations)
- List of short titles

United Kingdom

- Slavery at common law
- Barbados Slave Code of 1661
- Amelioration Act 1798
- Slavery Abolition Act 1833
- Article 4 of the European Convention on Human Rights
- Human Rights Act 1998

United States

- Partus sequitur ventrem
- Fugitive Slave Clause of the U.S. Constitution
- Three-Fifths Compromise of the U.S. Constitution
- Slave and free states
- Slave codes pertaining to individual states
- Northwest Ordinance of 1787
- Fugitive Slave Act of 1793
- Missouri Compromise (1820)
- Webster–Ashburton Treaty of 1842
- Compromise of 1850
- Fugitive Slave Act of 1850
- Act in Relation to Service (1851)
- Confiscation Act of 1861
- Act Prohibiting the Return of Slaves (1862)
- Emancipation Proclamation (1863)
- Thirteenth Amendment to the United States Constitution
- Freedmen's Bureau bills
- Shipping Commissioners Act of 1872

Other

- 1871 Law of Free Birth in Brazil
- 1888 Lei Áurea (Golden Law) in Brazil
- 1793 Upper Canada Act Against Slavery
- Russian Emancipation reform of 1861
- Anglo-Egyptian Slave Trade Convention
