= Slavery Abolition Act 1833 =

Act of the Parliament of the United Kingdom abolishing slavery in the British Empire

Slavery Abolition Act 1833 (Note: The citation of this act by this short title was authorised by section 1 of, and the first schedule to, the Short Titles Act 1896. Due to the repeal of those provisions it is now authorised by section 19(2) of the Interpretation Act 1978.)
- Act of Parliament
- Parliament of the United Kingdom
- Long title: An Act for the Abolition of Slavery throughout the British Colonies; for promoting the Industry of the manumitted Slaves; and for compensating the Persons hitherto entitled to the Services of such Slaves
- Citation: 3 & 4 Will. 4. c. 73
- Introduced by: Prime Minister Charles Grey, 2nd Earl Grey (Commons)
- Territorial extent: United Kingdom

Dates
- Royal assent: 28 August 1833
- Commencement: 1 August 1834 (Note: Section 1.)
- Repealed: 19 November 1998
Other legislation
Amended by	Court of Chancery (Funds) Act 1872; Statute Law Revision Act 1874
Repealed by	Statute Law (Repeals) Act 1998
Relates to	Slave Trade Act 1807; Slave Trade Felony Act 1811; Slave Trade Act 1824; Slave Trade Act 1833; Slave Trade Act 1843; Slave Trade Act 1873

Status: Repealed

Text of statute as originally enacted

Revised text of statute as amended

The Slavery Abolition Act 1833 (3 & 4 Will. 4. c. 73) was an act of the Parliament of the United Kingdom which abolished slavery in the British Empire by way of compensated emancipation. The act was legislated by Whig Prime Minister Charles Grey, 2nd Earl Grey's reforming administration, and it was enacted by ordering the British government to purchase the freedom of all slaves in the British Empire, and by outlawing the further practice of slavery in the British Empire. The act explicitly delineated 19 separate pots of compensation covering the Caribbean, South Africa, and Mauritius. Although Britain, Canada, Australia, and New Zealand were technically included, these had relatively few slaves at this time for other reasons. India was excluded. Around 800,000 freed slaves were attested in the claims process.

While the 1833 Act was a landmark, it did not end slavery throughout the entire British sphere of influence. The act explicitly excluded territories like British India, where slavery was addressed separately by the Indian Slavery Act, 1843. In regions colonised later, such as Nigeria, the abolition of pre-existing local systems of slavery was a gradual process that extended into the early 20th century. Furthermore, in British protectorates, which retained their own local laws, the institution persisted for much longer. For example, slavery in Bahrain was not legally abolished until 1937.

== Background ==
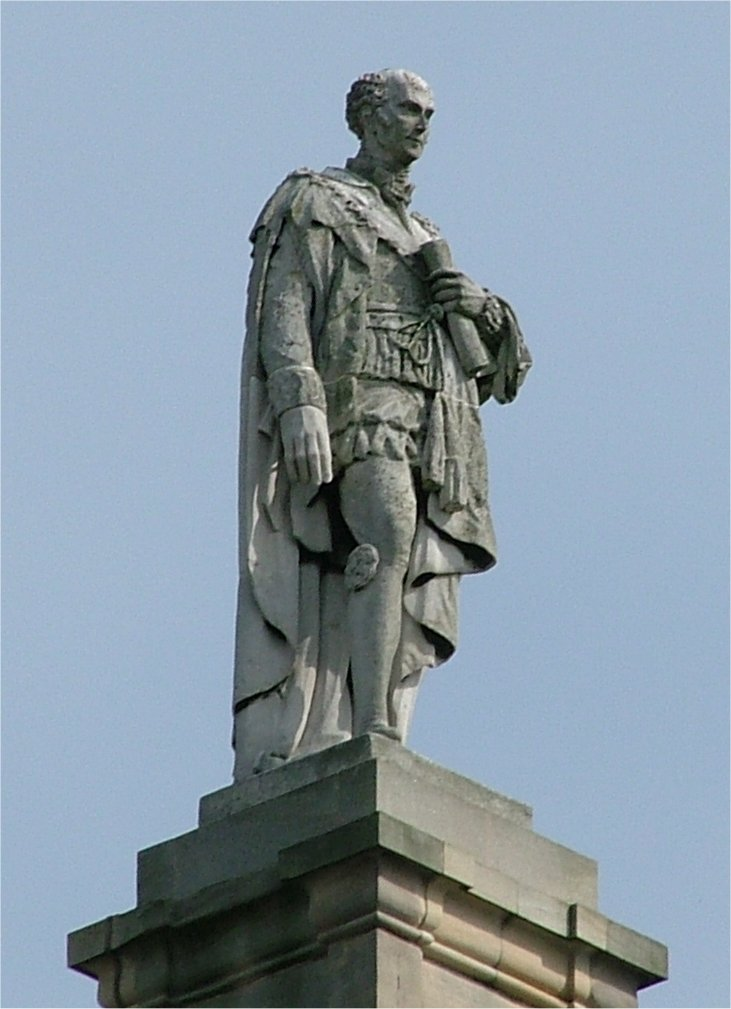
Grey's Monument in Newcastle upon Tyne, in remembrance of Prime Minister Charles Grey, 2nd Earl Grey, abolisher of slavery in the British Empire

Slavery had been judged to be without legal basis in England in 1772. In May of that year, Lord Mansfield's judgment in the Somerset case emancipated a slave who had been brought to England from Boston in the Province of Massachusetts Bay, and thus helped launch the movement to abolish slavery throughout the British Empire. The case ruled that slavery had no legal status in England as it had no common law or statutory law basis, and as such someone could not legally be a slave in England. However, many campaigners, including Granville Sharp, took the view that the ratio decidendi of the Somerset case meant that slavery was unsupported by law within England and that no ownership could be exercised on slaves entering English or Scottish soil. Ignatius Sancho, who in 1774 became the second recorded black person to vote in a British general election — the first being John London — wrote a letter in 1778 that opens in praise of Britain for its "freedom, and for the many blessings I enjoy in it", before criticising the actions towards his black brethren in parts of the Empire such as the West Indies.

=== Campaigns ===
By 1783, an anti-slavery movement to abolish the slave trade throughout the Empire had begun among the British public, with the Society for Effecting the Abolition of the Slave Trade being established in 1787. The Wedgwood anti-slavery medallion by Josiah Wedgwood was, according to the BBC, "the most famous image of a black person in all of 18th-century art". Fellow abolitionist Thomas Clarkson wrote: "Of the ladies several wore them in bracelets, and others had them fitted up in an ornamental manner as pins for their hair. At length, the taste for wearing them became general; and thus fashion, which usually confines itself to worthless things, was seen for once in the honourable office of promoting the cause of justice, humanity and freedom."

Spurred by an incident involving Chloe Cooley, a slave woman brought to Canada by an American loyalist, the Lieutenant-Governor of Upper Canada, John Graves Simcoe, tabled the Act Against Slavery in 1793. Passed by the local Legislative Assembly, it was the first legislation to outlaw the slave trade in a part of the British Empire. By the late 18th century, Britain was simultaneously the largest slave trader and centre of the largest abolitionist movement. William Wilberforce had written in his diary in 1787 that his great purpose in life was to suppress the slave trade before waging a 20-year fight on the industry.

Parliament passed the Slave Trade Act 1807 (47 Geo. 3 Sess. 1. c. 36), which outlawed the international slave trade in the British Empire, but not slavery itself. The legislation was timed to coincide with the expected Act Prohibiting Importation of Slaves by the United States, Britain's chief rival in maritime commerce. This legislation imposed fines that did little to deter slave trade participants. Abolitionist Henry Brougham realised that trading had continued, and as a new MP successfully introduced the Slave Trade Felony Act 1811 (51 Geo. 3. c. 23) which at last made the overseas slave trade a felony throughout the empire. The Royal Navy established the West Africa Squadron to suppress the Atlantic slave trade by patrolling the coast of West Africa. It did suppress the slave trade, but did not stop it entirely. Between 1808 and 1860, the West Africa Squadron captured 1,600 slave ships and freed 150,000 Africans. They resettled many in Jamaica and the Bahamas. Britain also used its influence to coerce other countries to agree to treaties to end their slave trade and allow the Royal Navy to seize their slave ships.

In 1823, the Anti-Slavery Society was founded in London. Members included Joseph Sturge, Thomas Clarkson, William Wilberforce, Henry Brougham, Thomas Fowell Buxton, Elizabeth Heyrick, Mary Lloyd, Jane Smeal, Elizabeth Pease, and Anne Knight. Jamaican mixed-race campaigners such as Louis Celeste Lecesne and Richard Hill were also members of the Anti-Slavery Society.

During the Christmas holiday of 1831, a large-scale slave revolt in Jamaica, known as the Baptist War, broke out. It was organised originally as a peaceful strike by the Baptist minister Samuel Sharpe. The rebellion was suppressed by the militia of the Jamaican plantocracy and the British garrison ten days later in early 1832. Because of the loss of property and life in the 1831 rebellion, the British Parliament held two inquiries. The results of these inquiries contributed greatly to the abolition of slavery with the Slavery Abolition Act 1833.

Up until then, sugar planters from rich British islands such as the Colony of Jamaica and Barbados were able to buy rotten and pocket boroughs, and they were able to form a body of resistance to moves to abolish slavery itself. This West India Lobby, which later evolved into the West India Committee, purchased enough seats to be able to resist the overtures of abolitionists. However, the Reform Act 1832 swept away their rotten borough seats, clearing the way for a majority of members of the House of Commons to push through a law to abolish slavery itself throughout the British Empire.

== Legislative decision-making ==
Though the British parliament had the right to pass legislation on matters that applied to the individual colonies in the British Empire, the loss of the Thirteen Colonies in the American War of Independence made legislators in London nervous about imposing their will on the sugar colonies in the Caribbean. Each British West Indian colony had its own legislature, and, in the view of the Colonial Office, involvement of those bodies would help the process of emancipation.

Through the 1820s, both abolitionists and the Colonial Office had a policy of "gradualism", fearful that sudden emancipation might be disadvantageous to the slaves as much as to the plantation owners. The first step was a process termed "amelioration". This included teaching the slaves Christianity, legalising slave marriages, banning the separation of slave families by sale and reducing the use of whips to impose discipline. The Sunday markets, where slaves could sell produce they had raised in their own time, should be moved to another day (respecting the Sabbath). Slaves were to be allowed to own property and, in limited circumstances, to give evidence in court. Another target was to give slaves the right to buy their own freedom, with the intention of encouraging them to save money from their own work. The abolitionists did not trust the individual colonies to pass legislation that met their needs. The Order in Council of 1824 put in place the amelioration provisions. Though developed in consultation with the West India lobby in London, it was met with the fullest criticism by those who operated plantations. They argued that the resulting damage to profitability required compensation. The amelioration measures were only partially implemented by the colonies, leaving the Colonial Office with the job of obtaining fuller compliance. Also, the British Government was now faced with the issue of compensation: something that had not been included in their plans.

The reality for the Government was that it had limited means to compel the colonies to pass legislation to comply with amelioration in its fullest extent. Over eight years, the Colonial Office worked to obtain full implementation, whilst exposing any mistreatment of slaves so as to demolish attempts by planters to justify the status quo of slavery. Abuses were now more difficult to conceal, especially with missionaries working with the slaves who could report incidents. The Colonial Office began rejecting colonial legislation when it was sent to London for approval. The Jamaica Consolidated Slave Act of 1826 was an example: through several iterations, it took five years for the Jamaican Assembly to pass an act that was acceptable in London.

In 1832, a slave rebellion occurred in Jamaica, fuelled by the belief that emancipation legislation had been enacted but was being withheld by the planters. The new parliament, following the Reform Act of 1833, largely removed West Indian interests from the chamber. The Colonial Office realised they now had to put forward their own emancipation bill before members of the new parliament did so themselves. The King voiced concern that compelling the colonies to make this next step might cause them to secede. Continuing hesitation ceased when Fowell Buxton said that he would present his own bill to the house.

An immediate problem was to decide on the mechanism of emancipation. An orderly transition was the object, with the economies of the colonies continuing to be based on commodity crops such as sugar. There was no model to follow, and the only recent emancipation event was the very different situation in Haiti, in which many had died. (Note: Slave emancipation occurred in an orderly manner in Chile in 1823 and Mexico in 1829. Both of these were of much smaller scale events than those in Haiti or the British Caribbean, and particularly without slave-worked plantations being a large part of the situation.) The practical problems differed between colonies: in Jamaica, the large amount of land available gave the opportunity for freed slaves to take up subsistence agriculture and cease to contribute to the economy; in islands such as Antigua, with virtually all the land given over to plantations, those freed would be compelled to continue in their old jobs. Suggested legislative ideas included heavy taxes on land that was not used to produce cash crops such as sugar. (Note: This was suggested by Lord Howick) This was intended to prevent former slaves from departing plantations en masse and collapsing the colony's economy. It was rejected by both abolitionists and planters, and ultimately by the Cabinet. Another proposal was for the government to buy the freedom of slaves for two days a week, then each slave would save their earnings for those two days until they could purchase their freedom. (Note: This suggestion came from Henry Taylor, the senior clerk in the Colonial Office.) This was also rejected as being impractical.

In March 1833, Edward Stanley took over as Secretary of State for the Colonies and introduced an abolition bill of his own. Though rejected, it had two innovations: freed slaves continuing to serve as apprentices, and compensation being paid to the plantation owners. The arguments that followed produced a draft in which Stanley's apprenticeship period was reduced from twelve to six years, and compensation was increased from £15 million to £20 million. The civil servants (Note: James Stephen drafted this bill in one 48-hour work session. Henry Taylor calculated the £20 million compensation figure as a fair amount for the actual financial loss arising from emancipation) who had produced this draft did not expect parliament to approve the compensation amount. Lord Howick, an originator of one of the discarded proposals, did not believe the house would approve even half the amount.

The members of the House of Commons saw things differently. The ownership of private property was of great importance to them; they felt the Napoleonic Wars had been fought with that principle in mind. An Act of Parliament that nullified the value of an entirely legally-held asset set a frightening precedent for the landowning classes, who were so widely represented in the House. If slave owners were not compensated for the government removing their property, how safe were the estates of those MPs from future government action? Consequently, the compensation was approved in the full amount of £20 million.

== The act ==
The act passed its second reading in the House of Commons unopposed on 22 July 1833, just a week before William Wilberforce died. The Commons third reading and passage occurred on 7 August, whereon it was sent to the Lords. Read there a second time on 12 August it passed the Lords on 20 August. The bill received royal assent on 28 August, and came into force the following year, on 1 August 1834.

Slaves below the age of six were freed immediately the act came into force. Former slaves over the age of six were redesignated as "apprentices", and their servitude was gradually abolished in two stages: the first set of apprenticeships came to an end on 1 August 1838, while the final apprenticeships were scheduled to cease on 1 August 1840. The act specifically excluded "the Territories in the Possession of the East India Company, or to the Island of Ceylon, or to the Island of Saint Helena." The exceptions were eliminated in 1843 with the Indian Slavery Act, 1843.

The period of apprenticeship differed between two groups. The first consisted of those former slaves who had worked on the land or in the manufacture of plantation produce (the praedial class, which was subdivided into those who, when enslaved, worked on their owner's property, and those who were hired out to work on land that did not belong to their owner). These apprenticeships should end by 1 August 1840, giving a six-year apprenticeship. Those who did not fall into this group, the non-praedial slaves, had a shorter term of four years, ending no later than 1 August 1838. This latter group included house servants.

Apprentices were obliged to carry out up to 45 hours of unpaid work each week for their masters. In return, they should receive food, clothes, medical care and housing. An apprentice had the right to buy discharge from their apprenticeship before its normal expiry. This was to be at a fair price, and the planter could not refuse to accept such a purchase.

The details of the process of emancipation were dealt with by the legislatures of the individual colonies. Compensation payments were withheld until appropriate legislation was enacted, so overall the process was satisfactory. The bill drafted in Jamaica was criticised by some in the colonial office, but the Secretary of State, Lord Stanley, forced through its acceptance in the belief that the colonies should be trusted on the matter.

A major exception to the expectations in London was that both Antigua and Bermuda rejected the idea of apprenticeships and chose, instead, to give immediate freedom to slaves on the effective date. The Antiguan planters saw no advantage for themselves in the apprentice system. This was seen in London as generating a risk when measured against the theoretical benefits of a slow transition through the apprenticeships. Nevertheless, the local legislation was accepted by the colonial office.

== Enforcement ==
The various provisions of the act, or of the local legislation required by the act, needed to be enforced. The existing magistrates in the colonies were largely plantation owners or managers who could not be considered independent in any dispute between an apprentice and a planter. Therefore, employed magistrates were recruited by the Crown and assigned to the various colonies. They were known as stipendiary magistrates. Here, there were failings by the colonial office. Too few stipendiary magistrates were recruited for the area that each had to cover, by a large margin. Only one hundred were authorised by the act, and after protests from the Governors of the colonies, this number was increased, but still to an inadequate level. They were poorly paid, yet the cost of living was greater than in Britain. Initially, they did not have sufficient provision for the expenses that were essential to carry out their work (for instance, two horses were considered a minimum requirement, given the amount of travel involved). Eventually, the Treasury allowed extra money to cover these costs. In many locations, the only place where they could reasonably obtain overnight accommodation was in the house of a planter, thereby compromising their independence.

== Early end to apprenticeships ==
From their first proposal, apprenticeships for former slaves were strongly opposed by abolitionists. With the Act in force, they now pressed for them to finish early. There were arguments over how effectively the process was working, with the government insisting that all was well. In 1836, a select committee was set up, including both abolitionists and those supporting the planters; it concluded that the system was satisfactory enough to continue. Four leading members of the abolitionist movement made a fact-finding mission to the West Indies in the latter part of 1836, gathering evidence that apprenticeships were not being fairly operated by the planters. This fed the campaigning during 1837, which increased in intensity towards the end of the year.

The pressure continued in 1838. The campaign in London was fully covered by colonial newspapers, so the impending end of apprenticeships for the non-praedial class at the beginning of August gave rise to fears of violent protests. The act was amended in March, with the changes effective on 11 April 1838. The amendments prohibited all flogging of apprentices, gave the stipendiary magistrates the power to release the victim of brutal treatment from their apprenticeship obligations, set more detailed rules on working hours and further regulated customary allowances. This had no effect on the vigour of the abolitionist campaigners. The individual colonies now felt the pressure on Parliament in London and realised that a decision there might further erode their authority to conduct their own affairs. First to take action was the Barbados legislature, prompted by the encouragement of Sir Murray MacGregor, the island's governor; an end to the apprenticeships on 1 August 1838 passed into Barbadian law on 16 May. Several other colonies followed this lead, but in those that did not, the situation became more difficult. For instance, the governor of Trinidad, Sir George Hill, travelled around the island to advise praedial apprentices that they had to serve another two years, but encountered angry meetings from apprentices who believed that the London parliament had agreed that they should be free in August. The resisting colonial legislatures slowly realised the inevitability of early emancipation, and though insisting that the planters had been badly treated by the British Parliament, Jamaica was the last to enact an end to apprenticeships, passing their legislation in the middle of June.

The colonial office had held off the introduction of measures to operate a free labour society in the British Caribbean, believing they had until the original expiry of the apprentice system. The early termination left some practical problems. Not least was a shortage of coinage with which to pay the newly free workers, and a banking system that could support the planters' financial obligations.

== Payments to slave owners ==
The act provided for compensation to slave-owners, but not to slaves. The amount of money to be spent on the payments was set at "the Sum of Twenty Million Pounds Sterling". Under the terms of the act, the British government raised £20 million to pay out for the loss of the slaves as business assets to the registered owners of the freed slaves. In 1833, £20 million amounted to 40% of the Treasury's annual income or approximately 5% of British GDP at the time. To finance the payments, the British government took on a £15 million loan, finalised on 3 August 1835, with banker Nathan Mayer Rothschild and his brother-in-law Moses Montefiore; £5 million was paid out directly in government stock, worth £1.5 billion in present day.

There have been claims the money was not paid back by the British taxpayers until 2015, but this claim is based on a technicality as to how the British Government financed their debt through undated gilts. According to the Treasury the 1837 slave debts were subsumed into a consolidated 4% loan issued in 1927 (maturing in 1957 or after). It was only when the British government modernised the gilt portfolio in 2015 by redeeming all remaining undated gilts that there was complete certainty that the debt was extinguished. The long gap between this money being borrowed and certainty of repayment was due to the type of financial instrument that was used, rather than the amount of money borrowed. Regardless, this does not contradict the fact that, in practical terms, taxpayer's money serviced the debt originated from the Slavery Abolition Act 1833.

Slave compensation was paid to approximately 42,000 people who lived in the colonies and about 3,500 who were resident in Britain. Of the British residents, some were absentee landlords, others were executors, mortgagees, trustees or heirs of slave owners. These absentees tended to have larger numbers of slaves; about half the compensation went to this group. About 5 to 10% of those who could be considered members of the British elite class appear in the slave compensation records. For example, Henry Phillpotts (then the Bishop of Exeter), with three others (as trustees and executors of the will of John Ward, 1st Earl of Dudley), was paid £12,700 for 665 slaves in the West Indies, whilst Henry Lascelles, 2nd Earl of Harewood received £26,309 for 2,554 slaves on six plantations. However, across the whole group of compensation recipients, the vast majority each owned a small number of slaves, and we must presume that they had among them many doctors, clergymen, and widows across the range of society. A surprising proportion, about 40%, of slave owners were women, something of particular note in a society were a woman's wealth transferred to her husband on marriage. Among absentee claimants, residents of Scotland were over-represented compared to other parts of Britain, with 15% of claimants whilst being only 10% of the British population.

The majority of men and women who were paid under the Slavery Abolition Act 1833 are listed in a Parliamentary Return, entitled Slavery Abolition Act, which is an account of all moneys awarded by the Commissioners of Slave Compensation in the Parliamentary Papers 1837–8 (215) vol. 48.

A successor organisation to the Anti-Slavery Society was formed in London in 1839, the British and Foreign Anti-Slavery Society, which worked to outlaw slavery worldwide. The world's oldest international human rights organisation, it continues today as Anti-Slavery International.

== Repeal ==
The whole act was repealed by section 1(1) of, and part VII of schedule 1 to, the Statute Law (Repeals) Act 1998, which came into force on 19 November 1998. Despite the act being repealed, slavery remains illegal, as court cases like Somerset v Stewart and Knight v Wedderburn had already deemed it illegal in Britain before the act's passage, the act itself only having applied to the British Empire, and this state of law carried over into the United Kingdom. Sections of the Slave Trade Act 1824 (5 Geo. 4. c. 113), Slave Trade Act 1843 (6 & 7 Vict. c. 98), and Slave Trade Act 1873 (36 & 37 Vict. c. 88) that prohibit and criminalise slavery also remain in force. In addition, the Human Rights Act 1998 incorporates Article 4 of the European Convention on Human Rights, which prohibits holding people as slaves, into British law, and the Modern Slavery Act 2015 also independently provides for the penalisation and prosecution of slavery.

== In popular culture ==
Ava DuVernay was commissioned by the Smithsonian's National Museum of African American History and Culture to create a film which debuted at the museum's opening on 24 September 2016. This film, 28 August: A Day in the Life of a People, tells of six significant events in African-American history that happened on the same date, 28 August. Events depicted include (among others) William IV's royal assent to the Slavery Abolition Act.

Amazing Grace is a 2006 British-American biographical drama film directed by Michael Apted, about the campaign against the slave trade in the British Empire, led by William Wilberforce, who was responsible for steering anti-slave trade legislation through the British parliament. The title is a reference to the 1772 hymn "Amazing Grace". The film also recounts the experiences of John Newton as a crewman on a slave ship and subsequent religious conversion, which inspired his writing of the poem later used in the hymn. Newton is portrayed as a major influence on Wilberforce and the abolition movement.

The act is referenced in the 2010 novel The Long Song by British author Andrea Levy and in the 2018 BBC television adaptation of the same name. The novel and television series tell the story of a slave in colonial Jamaica who lives through the period of slavery abolition in the British West Indies.

== See also ==
- 1926 Slavery Convention
- Act Against Slavery
- Blackbirding
- Blockade of Africa
- Brussels Conference Act of 1890
- Centre for the Study of the Legacies of British Slavery
- Compensated emancipation
- Gradual abolition of slavery
- Indian Slavery Act, 1843
- Slave Trade Acts
- Slavery in Britain
- Thirteenth Amendment to the United States Constitution
- Timeline of abolition of slavery and serfdom
