= Slave Trade Act 1873 =

Act of the Parliament of the United Kingdom

Slave Trade Act 1873 (Note: Section 1.)
- Act of Parliament
- Parliament of the United Kingdom
- Long title: An Act for consolidating with Amendments the Acts for carrying into effect Treaties for the more effectual Suppression of the Slave Trade, and for other purposes connected with the Slave Trade.
- Citation: 36 & 37 Vict. c. 88
- Introduced by: Robert Haldane-Duncan, 3rd Earl of Camperdown (Lords)
- Territorial extent: United Kingdom

Dates
- Royal assent: 5 August 1873
- Commencement: 5 August 1873 (Note: The Acts of Parliament (Commencement) Act 1793.)

Other legislation
- Amends: See § Repealed enactments
- Repeals/revokes: See § Repealed enactments
- Amended by: Statute Law Revision Act 1883; Colonial Courts of Admiralty Act 1890; Criminal Law Act 1967; Criminal Law Act (Northern Ireland) 1967; Statute Law (Repeals) Act 1976; Statute Law (Repeals) Act 1986; Extradition Act 1989; Statute Law (Repeals) Act 1998
- Relates to: Slave Trade Act 1807; Slave Trade Act 1824; Slavery Abolition Act 1833; Slave Trade Act 1843

Status: Amended

History of passage through Parliament

Records of Parliamentary debate relating to the statute from Hansard

Text of statute as originally enacted

Revised text of statute as amended

Text of the Slave Trade Act 1873 as in force today (including any amendments) within the United Kingdom, from legislation.gov.uk.

The Slave Trade Act 1873 (36 & 37 Vict. c. 88) is an act of the Parliament of the United Kingdom that consolidated all treaties for suppression of the slave trade, with some amendments.

== Passage ==
The Slave Trade (Consolidation) Bill had its first reading in the House of Lords on 1 July 1873, introduced by Robert Haldane-Duncan, 3rd Earl of Camperdown. The bill had its second reading in the House of Lords on 7 July 1873 and was committed to a committee of the whole house, which met and reported on 8 July 1873, without amendments. The bill had its third reading in the House of Lords on 31 July 1873 and passed, without amendments.

The bill had its first reading in the House of Commons on 18 July 1873. The bill had its second reading in the House of Commons on 22 July 1873 and was committed to a committee of the whole house, which met on 24 July 1873 and 29 July 1873 reported on 29 July 1873, with amendments. The amended bill had its third reading in the House of Commons on 30 July 1873 and passed, with amendments.

The amended bill was considered and agreed to by the House of Lords on 2 August 1873.

The bill was granted royal assent on 5 August 1873.

== Repealed enactments ==
Section 30 of the act repealed 49 enactments, listed in the second schedule to the act.

| Citation | Short title | Title | Extent of repeal |
|---|---|---|---|
| 59 Geo. 3. c. 16 | Slave Trade Suppression, Netherlands Act 1819 | An Act to carry into effect the treaty with the Netherlands relating to the slave trade. | The whole act. |
| 5 Geo. 4. c. 113 | Slave Trade Act 1824 | An Act to amend and consolidate the laws relating to the abolition of the slave trade. | The whole act, except sections two to eleven, section twelve, down to "taken to be in full force," sections thirty-nine, forty, and forty-seven. |
| 7 & 8 Geo. 4. c. 54 | Slave Trade (Treaty with Sweden) Act 1827 | An Act to carry into effect the treaty with Sweden relative to the slave trade. | The whole act. |
| 7 & 8 Geo. 4. c. 74 | Slave Trade (Convention with Brazil) Act 1827 | An Act to carry into execution a convention between His Majesty and the Emperor of Brazil for the regulation and final abolition of the African slave trade. | The whole act. |
| 11 Geo. 4 & 1 Will. 4. c. 55 | Bounties on Seizure of Slaves Act 1830 | An Act to reduce the amount of penalties payable under the seizure of slaves. | The whole act. |
| 3 & 4 Will. 4. c. 72 | Slave Trade Act 1833 | An Act for carrying into effect two conventions with the King of the French for suppressing the slave trade. | The whole act. |
| 5 & 6 Will. 4. c. 60 | Slave Trade Act 1835 | An Act for carrying into effect a treaty with His Majesty the King of Sardinia for suppressing the slave trade. | The whole act. |
| 5 & 6 Will. 4. c. 61 | Slave Trade (No. 2) Act 1835 | An Act for carrying into effect the treaty with the King of the French relative to the slave trade. | The whole act. |
| 6 & 7 Will. 4. c. 6 | Slave Trade Suppression (Treaty with Spain) Act 1836 | An Act for carrying into effect a treaty made between His Majesty and the King of Denmark relative to the slave trade. | The whole act. |
| 6 & 7 Will. 4. c. 81 | Slave Trade Act 1836 | An Act to revive and continue, until six months after the commencement of the next session of Parliament, to carry into immediate execution, by Order in Council, treaties or conventions made with any foreign power or state for the abolition of the slave trade. | The whole act. |
| 7 Will. 4 & 1 Vict. c. 62 | Slave Trade Act 1837 | An Act to continue for six months more next after the commencement of the next session, by Order in Council, any treaties, conventions, or stipulations made with any foreign power or state for the abolition of the slave trade. | The whole act. |
| 1 & 2 Vict. c. 39 | Slave Trade Treaties Act 1838 | An Act for carrying into effect a convention of accession of the free Towns to two conventions with the King of the French for suppressing the slave trade. | The whole act. |
| 1 & 2 Vict. c. 40 | Slave Trade Treaty (Sweden) Act 1838 | An Act for carrying into effect an additional article to a treaty with the Netherlands relating to the slave trade. | The whole act. |
| 1 & 2 Vict. c. 41 | Slave Trade Treaty (Netherlands) Act 1838 | An Act for carrying into effect an additional article to a treaty with the Sardinians relating to the slave trade. | The whole act. |
| 1 & 2 Vict. c. 47 | Slave Trade Suppression Act 1838 | An Act for the better and more effectually carrying into effect the treaties and conventions made with foreign powers for suppressing the slave trade. | The whole act. |
| 1 & 2 Vict. c. 83 | Slave Trade Treaties (No. 2) Act 1838 | An Act for carrying into effect a convention of accession with the King of the French for suppressing the slave trade. | The whole act. |
| 1 & 2 Vict. c. 84 | Slave Trade Treaties (No. 3) Act 1838 | An Act for carrying into effect a convention of accession of the King of the Two Sicilies to two conventions with the King of the French for suppressing the slave trade. | The whole act. |
| 1 & 2 Vict. c. 102 | Slave Trade Suppression (No. 2) Act 1838 | An Act to revive and continue, until six months after the commencement of the next session of Parliament, and to amend, to enable Her Majesty, by Order in Council, to carry into immediate execution, by Order in Council, any treaties made for the suppression of the slave trade. | The whole act. |
| 2 & 3 Vict. c. 73 | Slave Trade Suppression Act 1839 | An Act relating to the slave trade. | The whole act. |
| 3 & 4 Vict. c. 64 | Slave Trade Suppression Act 1840 | An Act to continue until eight months after the commencement of the next session of Parliament, an Act for authorizing Her Majesty to carry into immediate execution, by Orders in Council, any treaties for the suppression of the slave trade. | The whole act. |
| 3 & 4 Vict. c. 67 | Slave Trade Suppression, Treaty with Venezuela Act 1840 | An Act for carrying into effect the treaty between Her Majesty and the Republic of Venezuela for the suppression of the slave trade. | The whole act. |
| 5 & 6 Vict. c. 40 | Argentine Treaty Act 1842 | An Act for carrying into effect the treaty between Her Majesty and the King of Hanover for the abolition of the slave trade. | The whole act. |
| 5 & 6 Vict. c. 41 | Treaty with Hayti Act 1842 | An Act for carrying into effect a convention between Her Majesty and the King of Brazil for the more effectual suppression of the slave trade. | The whole act. |
| 5 & 6 Vict. c. 42 | Slave Trade Suppression Act 1842 | An Act to better and more effectually carrying into effect treaties and conventions with foreign states for suppressing the slave trade. | The whole act. |
| 5 & 6 Vict. c. 59 | Slave Trade Suppression Act (No. 2) 1842 | An Act to continue until the first day of August one thousand eight hundred and forty-three an Act for authorizing Her Majesty to carry into immediate execution, by Orders in Council, any treaties for the suppression of the slave trade. | The whole act. |
| 5 & 6 Vict. c. 91 | Slave Trade Suppression Act (No. 3) 1842 | An Act to amend an Act of the second and third years of Her present Majesty for suppression of the slave trade. | The whole act. |
| 5 & 6 Vict. c. 101 | Slave Trade Suppression Act (No. 4) 1842 | An Act for extending to the governors and officers of the East India Company the powers given by section forty-three of an Act of the Fifth and Fourth, to Her Majesty's governors and officers for the more effectual suppression of the slave trade. | The whole act. |
| 5 & 6 Vict. c. 114 | Slave Trade Suppression Act (No. 4) 1842 | An Act to repeal so much of an Act of the second and third years of Her present Majesty for the suppression of the slave trade as relates to Portuguese vessels. | The whole act. |
| 6 & 7 Vict. c. 14 | Slave Trade Treaty with Bolivia Act 1843 | An Act for carrying into effect a treaty between Her Majesty and the Republic of Bolivia for the abolition of the slave trade. | The whole act. |
| 6 & 7 Vict. c. 15 | Slave Trade Treaty with Texas Act 1843 | An Act for carrying into effect a treaty between Her Majesty and the Republic of Texas for the suppression of the African slave trade. | The whole act. |
| 6 & 7 Vict. c. 16 | Slave Trade Treaty with Uruguay Act 1843 | An Act for carrying into effect a treaty between Her Majesty and the Oriental Republic of the Uruguay for the abolition of the slave trade. | The whole act. |
| 6 & 7 Vict. c. 46 | Slave Trade (No. 1) Act 1843 | An Act to continue until the thirty-first day of August one thousand eight hundred and forty-four, and to the end of the then session of Parliament, an Act for authorizing Her Majesty to carry into immediate execution, by Orders in Council, any treaties for the suppression of the slave trade. | The whole act. |
| 6 & 7 Vict. c. 50 | Slave Trade Treaties Act 1843 | An Act for carrying into execution a treaty signed at London for the suppression of the slave trade between Great Britain, Austria, Prussia, and Russia. | The whole act. |
| 6 & 7 Vict. c. 51 | Slave Trade Treaty with Mexico Act 1843 | An Act for carrying into effect the treaty between Her Majesty and the Republic Iran for the Abolition of the traffic in slaves. | The whole act. |
| 6 & 7 Vict. c. 52 | Slave Trade Treaties with Chile Act 1843 | An Act for carrying into effect the treaty between Her Majesty and the Republic of Chile for the abolition of the slave trade. | The whole act. |
| 6 & 7 Vict. c. 53 | Slave Trade Treaties with Portugal Act 1843 | An Act for carrying into effect the treaty between Her Majesty and the Queen of Portugal for the suppression of the traffic in slaves. | The whole act. |
| 6 & 7 Vict. c. 98 | Slave Trade Act 1843 | An Act for the more effectual suppression of the slave trade. | Section three. |
| 7 & 8 Vict. c. 26 | Slave Trade Act 1844 | An Act for authorizing Her Majesty to carry into immediate execution, by Order in Council, any treaties for the suppression of the slave trade. | The whole act. |
| 11 & 12 Vict. c. 116 | Slave Trade Act 1848 | An Act for carrying into effect the treaty between Her Majesty and the Republic of the Equator for the abolition of the traffic in slaves. | The whole act. |
| 11 & 12 Vict. c. 128 | Slave Trade (Muscat) Act 1848 | An Act for carrying into effect the treaty between Her Majesty and the Imaum of Muscat for the more effectual suppression of the slave trade. | The whole act. |
| 12 & 13 Vict. c. 84 | Slave Trade Act 1849 | An Act for carrying into effect engagements with Her Majesty and certain Arabian chiefs in the Persian Gulf for the more effectual suppression of the slave trade. | The whole act. |
| 16 & 17 Vict. c. 16 | Slave Trade Suppression (Treaty with Sohar) Act 1853 | An Act for carrying into effect the engagement between Her Majesty and Syed Syf bin Hamood, the Chief of Sohar in Arabia, for the more effectual suppression of the slave trade. | The whole act. |
| 16 & 17 Vict. c. 17 | Slave Trade Suppression (Treaty with New Granada) Act 1853 | An Act for carrying into effect the treaty between Her Majesty and the Republic of New Granada for the suppression of the slave trade. | The whole act. |
| 16 & 17 Vict. c. 107 | Customs Consolidation Act 1853 | The Customs Consolidation Act, 1853 | Section one hundred and eighty-nine. |
| 18 & 19 Vict. c. 85 | Slave Trade Suppression, African Treaty Act 1855 | An Act for carrying into effect the engagements between Her Majesty and certain chiefs of the Gallinas country, near Sierra Leone, in Africa, for the more effectual suppression of the slave trade. | The whole act. |
| 25 & 26 Vict. c. 40 | African Slave Trade Treaty Act (No. 1) 1862 | African Slave Trade Treaty Act (No. 1), 1862 | The whole act. |
| 25 & 26 Vict. c. 90 | African Slave Trade Treaty Act (No. 2) 1862 | African Slave Trade Treaty Act (No. 2), 1862 | The whole act. |
| 26 & 27 Vict. c. 34 | African Slave Trade Treaty Act 1863 | African Slave Trade Treaty Act, 1863 | The whole act. |
| 32 & 33 Vict. c. 2 | Brazilian Slave Trade Repeal Act 1869 | The British Slave Trade Acts Repeal Act, 1869 | The whole act. |

== Subsequent developments ==
In section 26 of the act, the words " or in the county of Middlesex ", were repealed for England and Wales by section 10(2) of, and part III of schedule 3 to, the Criminal Law Act 1967, which came into force on 1 January 1968.

In section 18 of the act, the words from "or given" onwards were repealed by section 1(1) of, and part I of schedule 1 to, the Statute Law (Repeals) Act 1976, which came into force on 27 May 1976. In section 2 of the act, in the definition of "governor" and the proviso were repealed by section 1(1) of, and part VII of schedule 1 to, the 1976 act.

In section 2 of the act, in the definition of "British slave court", the words from "and every East African Court" onwards were repealed by section 1(1) of, and part IX of schedule 1 to, the Statute Law (Repeals) Act 1986, which came into force on 2 May 1986. In section 29, the words from "within six weeks" (where first occurring) to "Gazette" were repealed by section 1(1) of, and part XII of schedule 1 to, the 1986 act.

== See also ==
- Slave Trade Acts
- Slave Trade Act 1807
- Slave Trade Act 1824
- Slavery Abolition Act 1833
- Slave Trade Act 1843
