= Slave Trade Act 1843 =

Act of the Parliament of the United Kingdom

Slave Trade Act 1843 (Note: The citation of this act by this short title was authorised by section 1 of, and the first schedule to, the Short Titles Act 1896. Due to the repeal of those provisions it is now authorised by section 19(2) of the Interpretation Act 1978.)
- Act of Parliament
- Parliament of the United Kingdom
- Long title: An Act for the more effectual Suppression of the Slave Trade.
- Citation: 6 & 7 Vict. c. 98
- Territorial extent: United Kingdom

Dates
- Royal assent: 24 August 1843
- Commencement: 1 November 1843 (Note: Section 7.)
Other legislation
Amended by	Slave Trade Act 1873; Statute Law Revision Act 1874 (No. 2); Statute Law Revision Act 1891; Courts Act 1971; Statute Law (Repeals) Act 1976; Judicature (Northern Ireland) Act 1978; Statute Law (Repeals) Act 1998

Status: Amended

Text of statute as originally enacted

Revised text of statute as amended

Text of the Slave Trade Act 1843 as in force today (including any amendments) within the United Kingdom, from legislation.gov.uk.

The Slave Trade Act 1843 (6 & 7 Vict. c. 98) is an act of the Parliament of the United Kingdom "for the more effectual Suppression of the Slave Trade."

As of 2026, the act remains in force in the United Kingdom.

== Subsequent developments ==
Section 4(2) of the act was repealed by section 1(1) of, and part VI of schedule 1 to, the Statute Law (Repeals) Act 1976, which came into force on 27 May 1976.

Section 2 of the act was repealed by section 1 of, and the first schedule to, the Statute Law Revision Act 1891 (54 & 55 Vict. c. 67), which came into force on 5 August 1891.

== See also ==
- Slave Trade Acts
- Slave Trade Act 1807
- Slave Trade Act 1824
- Slavery Abolition Act 1833
- Slave Trade Act 1873
