= Chelsea Hospital Act 1843 =

Act of the Parliament of the United Kingdom

Chelsea Hospital Act 1843 (Note: The citation of this act by this short title was authorised by section 3 of, and schedule 3 to, the Statute Law (Repeals) Act 1977. Due to the repeal of those provisions, it is now authorised by section 19(2) of the Interpretation Act 1978.)
- Act of Parliament
- Parliament of the United Kingdom
- Long title: An Act to enable the Commissioners of Chelsea Hospital to purchase certain Parcels of Land for the Benefit of the said Hospital, and for other Purposes.
- Citation: 6 & 7 Vict. c. 31
- Territorial extent: United Kingdom

Dates
- Royal assent: 12 July 1843
- Commencement: 12 July 1843 (Note: The Acts of Parliament (Commencement) Act 1793.)

Status: Current legislation

Text of statute as originally enacted

Revised text of statute as amended

Text of the Chelsea Hospital Act 1843 as in force today (including any amendments) within the United Kingdom, from legislation.gov.uk.

The Chelsea Hospital Act 1843 (6 & 7 Vict. c. 31) is an act of the Parliament of the United Kingdom. It gave authorisation to the "Lords and Other Commissioners" of Chelsea hospital to purchase certain properties using funds received from the will of the late Colonel John Drouley.
