= Slave Trade Act 1824 =

UK law classing the slave trade as piracy

Slave Trade Act 1824 (Note: The citation of this act by this short title was authorised by section 1 of, and the first schedule to, the Short Titles Act 1896. Due to the repeal of those provisions it is now authorised by section 19(2) of the Interpretation Act 1978.)
- Act of Parliament
- Parliament of the United Kingdom
- Long title: An Act to amend and consolidate the Laws relating to the Abolition of the Slave Trade.
- Citation: 5 Geo. 4. c. 113
- Introduced by: Thomas Spring Rice MP (Commons); Robert Jenkinson, 2nd Earl of Liverpool (Lords)
- Territorial extent: United Kingdom

Dates
- Royal assent: 24 June 1824
- Commencement: 1 January 1825 (Note: Section 82.)
Other legislation
Amends	See § Repealed enactments
Repeals/revokes	See § Repealed enactments
Amended by	Slave Trade Act 1828; Punishment of Offences Act 1837; Statute Law Revision Act 1861; Vice Admiralty Courts Act 1863; Statute Law Revision Act 1873; Slave Trade Act 1873; Statute Law Revision (No. 2) Act 1888; Statute Law Revision Act 1890; Forgery Act 1913; Criminal Justice Act 1948; Criminal Law Act (Northern Ireland) 1967; Criminal Procedure (Scotland) Act 1975; Statute Law (Repeals) Act 1998
Relates to	Prize Money, etc. Act 1817

Status: Amended

Text of statute as originally enacted

Revised text of statute as amended

Text of the Slave Trade Act 1824 as in force today (including any amendments) within the United Kingdom, from legislation.gov.uk.

The Slave Trade Act 1824 (5 Geo. 4. c. 113), also known as the Slave Piracy Act, is an act of the Parliament of the United Kingdom that amended and consolidated the laws relating to the abolition of the slave trade.

== Background ==
In May 1772, Lord Mansfield's judgment in the Somerset case emancipated a slave who had been brought to England from Boston in the Province of Massachusetts Bay, and thus helped launch the movement to abolish slavery throughout the British Empire. The case ruled that slavery had no legal status in England as it had no common law or statutory law basis, and as such someone could not legally be a slave in England.

After the formation of the Committee for the Abolition of the Slave Trade in 1787, William Wilberforce led the cause of abolition through the parliamentary campaign. It finally abolished the slave trade in the British Empire with the Slave Trade Act 1807 (47 Geo. 3 Sess. 1. c. 36).

Between 1807 and 1823, abolitionists showed little interest in abolishing slavery itself. Eric Williams presented economic data in Capitalism and Slavery to show that the slave trade itself generated only small profits compared to the much more lucrative sugar plantations of the Caribbean, and therefore slavery continued to thrive on those estates. However, from 1823 the British Caribbean sugar industry went into terminal decline, and the British parliament no longer felt they needed to protect the economic interests of the West Indian sugar planters.

In 1823, the Anti-Slavery Society was founded in London. Members included Joseph Sturge, Thomas Clarkson, William Wilberforce, Henry Brougham, Thomas Fowell Buxton, Elizabeth Heyrick, Mary Lloyd, Jane Smeal, Elizabeth Pease, and Anne Knight. Jamaican mixed-race campaigners such as Louis Celeste Lecesne and Richard Hill were also members of the Anti-Slavery Society.

On 19 February 1824, a committee of the whole house considered the Slave Trade Act 1807 (47 Geo. 3 Sess. 1. c. 36) and the granting of bounties on the capture and condemnation of slaves, and made the following resolutions:

1. Resolved, That upon the condemnation of any Slaves, taken as prize of war, there shall be paid to the captors thereof such Bounty as His Majesty shall direct, not exceeding the sum of Twenty pounds for every man, woman and child, taken and condemned.

2. Resolved, That upon the condemnation of any Slaves seized at sea, there shall be paid to the commanding officer who shall seize and prosecute the same, the sum of Ten pounds for every man, woman and child; and where such seizure shall not have been made at sea, there shall be paid to the person who shall sue and prosecute the same, the sum of Seven pounds ten shillings for every man, woman and child, and the like sum to the governor of the colony wherein such seizure shall be made.

3. Resolved, That there shall be paid a Bounty of Ten pounds for every Slave seized on board any ship, and condemned for illicit traffic in Slaves, in violation of the several conventions relating to the Slave Trade.

4. Resolved, That it is expedient to amend and consolidate the laws relating to the Abolition of the Slave Trade in these Resolutions: And that Dr. Phillimore and Dr. Lushington do prepare and bring in the same.

== Passage ==
Leave to bring in the Slave Trade Laws Bill to the House of Commons was granted on 19 February 1824 to Sir Robert Phillimore MP and Dr Stephen Lushington MP. The bill had its first reading in the House of Commons on 8 April 1824, presented by Thomas Spring Rice MP. The bill had its second reading in the House of Commons on 10 April 1824 and was committed to a committee of the whole house, which met on and reported on 12 April 1824, with amendments. The amended bill was considered and re-committed to a committee of the whole house on 5 May 1824, which met and reported on 7 May 1824. The amended bill had its third reading in the House of Commons on 14 May 1824 and passed, with amendments.

The bill, referred to as the Slave Trade Laws Consolidation Bill, had its first reading in the House of Lords on 18 May 1824. The bill had its second reading in the House of Lords on 31 May 1824 and was committed to a committee of the whole house, which met on 17 June 1824 and reported on 18 June 1824, with amendments. The amended bill had its third reading in the House of Lords on 21 June 1824, during which a motion to re-commit the bill to a committee of the whole house was defeated, and passed, with amendments.

The amended bill was considered and agreed to by the House of Commons on 22 June 1824.

The bill was granted royal assent on 24 June 1824.

== Provisions ==
Section 9 of the act created a capital offence (death penalty), categorising slave trading (on the high seas) as piracy.

Section 25 of the act provided that His Majesty could by Order in Council, until 31 July 1827, authorise the removal of slaves from any British island in the West Indies to another British island there if deemed essential for their welfare, under stipulated conditions for their benefit and with security taken for their value.

=== Repealed enactments ===
Section 1 of the act repealed "...all the Acts and Enactments relating to the Slave Trade and the Abolition thereof, and the Exportation and Importation of Slaves, shall be and the same are hereby repealed, save and except in so far as they may have repealed any prior Acts or Enactments, or may have been acted upon, or may be expressly confirmed by this present Act.", effective on 1 January 1825.

Section 30 of the act provided that nothing in the act would repeal the Prize Money, etc. Act 1817 (57 Geo. 3. c. 127).

== Subsequent developments ==
Slave Trade Act 1828
- Act of Parliament
- Parliament of the United Kingdom
- Long title: An Act to continue an Act for amending and consolidating the Laws relating to the Abolition of the Slave Trade.
- Citation: 9 Geo. 4. c. 84
- Territorial extent: United Kingdom

Dates
- Royal assent: 25 July 1828
- Commencement: 25 July 1828 (Note: The Acts of Parliament (Commencement) Act 1793.)
- Expired: 31 July 1829 (Note: Section 1.)
- Repealed: 6 August 1861
Other legislation
Amends	Slave Trade Act 1824
Repealed by	Statute Law Revision Act 1861

Status: Repealed

Text of statute as originally enacted

Section 25 of the act, authorising the removal of slaves between British West Indian islands under certain conditions for their welfare, was continued until the end of the next session of parliament after 31 July 1829 by section 1 of the Slave Trade Act 1828 (9 Geo. 4. c. 84).

The capital offence for slave trading on the high seas was reduced to transportation for life by section 1 of the Punishment of Offences Act 1837 (7 Will. 4 & 1 Vict. c. 91).

Slavery remained legal in most of the British Empire until the Slavery Abolition Act 1833 (3 & 4 Will. 4. c. 73).

The whole act, except sections 2–11, 12 down to "taken to be in full force," 39, 40 and 47 were repealed by the Slave Trade Act 1873 (36 & 37 Vict. c. 88), which came into force on 5 August 1873.

Sections 3–9, 12 39, 40 and 47 of the act were repealed by section 1(1) of, and part VIII of schedule 1 to, the Statute Law (Repeals) Act 1998, which came into force on 19 November 1998.

The act is still in force in the United Kingdom, but now has no legislative effect, all the provisions having been repealed by subsequent legislation, although portions may have been incorporated in later legislation.

== See also ==
- Slave Trade Acts
- Slave Trade Act 1788
- Slave Trade Act 1807
- Slavery Abolition Act 1833
- Slave Trade Act 1843
- Slave Trade Act 1873
