= List of acts of the Parliament of the United Kingdom from 1843 =

This is a complete list of acts of the Parliament of the United Kingdom for the year 1843.

Note that the first parliament of the United Kingdom was held in 1801; parliaments between 1707 and 1800 were either parliaments of Great Britain or of Ireland). For acts passed up until 1707, see the list of acts of the Parliament of England and the list of acts of the Parliament of Scotland. For acts passed from 1707 to 1800, see the list of acts of the Parliament of Great Britain. See also the list of acts of the Parliament of Ireland.

For acts of the devolved parliaments and assemblies in the United Kingdom, see the list of acts of the Scottish Parliament, the list of acts of the Northern Ireland Assembly, and the list of acts and measures of Senedd Cymru; see also the list of acts of the Parliament of Northern Ireland.

The number shown after each act's title is its chapter number. Acts passed before 1963 are cited using this number, preceded by the year(s) of the reign during which the relevant parliamentary session was held; thus the Union with Ireland Act 1800 is cited as "39 & 40 Geo. 3 c. 67", meaning the 67th act passed during the session that started in the 39th year of the reign of George III and which finished in the 40th year of that reign. Note that the modern convention is to use Arabic numerals in citations (thus "41 Geo. 3" rather than "41 Geo. III"). Acts of the last session of the Parliament of Great Britain and the first session of the Parliament of the United Kingdom are both cited as "41 Geo. 3".

Some of these acts have a short title. Some of these acts have never had a short title. Some of these acts have a short title given to them by later acts, such as by the Short Titles Act 1896.

== 6 & 7 Vict. ==
The third session of the 14th Parliament of the United Kingdom, which met from 2 February 1843 until 24 August 1843.

=== Public general acts ===
Short title	Citation	Royal assent
Long title
Forged Exchequer Bills Act 1843 (repealed)	6 & 7 Vict. c. 1	3 March 1843
An Act to enable Her Majesty to indemnify the Holders of certain forged Exchequer Bills. (Repealed by Statute Law Revision Act 1874 (No. 2) (37 & 38 Vict. c. 96))
Coal Vendors Act 1843 (repealed)	6 & 7 Vict. c. 2	3 March 1843
An Act to discontinue certain Actions under the Provisions of an Act of the Second Year of King William the Fourth, (Note: London, Westminster and Home Counties Coal Trade Act 1831 (1 & 2 Will. 4. c. lxxvi)) for relating the Vend and Delivery of Coals in the Cities of London and Westminster, and in certain Parts of the adjacent Counties. (Repealed by Statute Law Revision Act 1874 (No. 2) (37 & 38 Vict. c. 96))
Mutiny Act 1843 (repealed)	6 & 7 Vict. c. 3	3 April 1843
An Act for punishing Mutiny and Desertion, and for the better Payment of the Army and their Quarters. (Repealed by Statute Law Revision Act 1874 (No. 2) (37 & 38 Vict. c. 96))
Marine Mutiny Act 1843 (repealed)	6 & 7 Vict. c. 4	3 April 1843
An Act for the Regulation of Her Majesty's Royal Marine Forces while on shore. (Repealed by Statute Law Revision Act 1874 (No. 2) (37 & 38 Vict. c. 96))
Supply Act 1843 (repealed)	6 & 7 Vict. c. 5	3 April 1843
An Act to apply the Sum of Eight Millions out of the Consolidated Fund to the Service of the Year One thousand eight hundred and forty-three. (Repealed by Statute Law Revision Act 1874 (No. 2) (37 & 38 Vict. c. 96))
House of Lords Oath Act 1843 (repealed)	6 & 7 Vict. c. 6	3 April 1843
An Act to alter the Hours within which certain Oaths and Declarations are to be made and subscribed in the House of Peers. (Repealed by Parliamentary Oaths Act 1866 (29 & 30 Vict. c. 19))
Transportation Act 1843 (repealed)	6 & 7 Vict. c. 7	3 April 1843
An Act to amend the Law affecting transported Convicts with respect to Pardons and Tickets of Leave. (Repealed for England and Wales by Criminal Justice Act 1948 (11 & 12 Geo. 6. c. 58), for Scotland by Criminal Justice (Scotland) Act 1949 (12, 13 & 14 Geo. 6. c. 94) and for Northern Ireland by Statute Law Revision Act 1874 (No. 2) (37 & 38 Vict. c. 96), Statute Law Revision Act 1891 (54 & 55 Vict. c. 67) and Criminal Justice Act (Northern Ireland) 1953 (c. 14 (N.I.)))
Justices (Ireland) Act 1843 (repealed)	6 & 7 Vict. c. 8	3 April 1843
An Act to empower Justices of the Peace in Ireland to act in certain Cases relating to Rates to which they are chargeable. (Repealed by Magistrates' Courts Act (Northern Ireland) 1964 (c. 21 (N.I.)))
Indemnity Act 1843 (repealed)	6 & 7 Vict. c. 9	3 April 1843
An Act to indemnify such Persons in the United Kingdom as have omitted to qualify themselves for Offices and Employments, and to extend the Time limited for those Purposes respectively until the Twenty-fifth Day of March One thousand eight hundred and forty-four; and for the Relief of Clerks to Attornies and Solicitors in certain Cases. (Repealed by Promissory Oaths Act 1871 (34 & 35 Vict. c. 48))
Punishment of Death Act 1843 (repealed)	6 & 7 Vict. c. 10	11 April 1843
An Act for removing Doubts as to the Punishment which may be awarded under the Provisions of an Act of the Fourth and Fifth Years of Her present Majesty, (Note: Substitution of Punishments for Death Act 1841 (4 & 5 Vict. c. 56)) "for taking away the Punishment of Death in certain Cases," for certain Offences therein specified. (Repealed by Criminal Statutes Repeal Act 1861 (24 & 25 Vict. c. 95))
Sudbury Disfranchisement Act 1843 (repealed)	6 & 7 Vict. c. 11	11 April 1843
An Act to indemnify Witnesses who may give Evidence before the Lords Spiritual and Temporal on a Bill to exclude the Borough of Sudbury from sending Burgesses to serve in Parliament. (Repealed by Statute Law Revision Act 1874 (No. 2) (37 & 38 Vict. c. 96))
Coroners Act 1843 (repealed)	6 & 7 Vict. c. 12	11 April 1843
An Act for the more convenient holding of Coroners Inquests. (Repealed for England and Wales by Coroners Act 1887 (50 & 51 Vict. c. 71) and for Northern Ireland by Coroners Act (Northern Ireland) 1959 (c. 15 (N.I.)))
British Settlements Act 1843 (repealed)	6 & 7 Vict. c. 13	11 April 1843
An Act to enable Her Majesty to provide for the Government of her Settlements on the Coast of Africa and in the Falkland Islands. (Repealed by British Settlements Act 1887 (50 & 51 Vict. c. 54))
Slave Trade Treaty with Bolivia Act 1843 (repealed)	6 & 7 Vict. c. 14	11 April 1843
An Act for carrying into effect a Treaty between Her Majesty and the Republic of Bolivia for the Abolition of the Slave Trade. (Repealed by Slave Trade Act 1873 (36 & 37 Vict. c. 88))
Slave Trade Treaty with Texas Act 1843 (repealed)	6 & 7 Vict. c. 15	11 April 1843
An Act for carrying into effect the Treaty between Her Majesty and the Republic of Texas for the Suppression of the African Slave Trade. (Repealed by Slave Trade Act 1873 (36 & 37 Vict. c. 88))
Slave Trade Treaty with Uruguay Act 1843 (repealed)	6 & 7 Vict. c. 16	11 April 1843
An Act for carrying into effect the Treaty between Her Majesty and the Oriental Republic of the Uruguay, for the Abolition of the Slave Trade. (Repealed by Slave Trade Act 1873 (36 & 37 Vict. c. 88))
Exchequer Bills Act 1843 (repealed)	6 & 7 Vict. c. 17	9 May 1843
An Act for raising the Sum of Nine millions and fifty thousand Pounds by Exchequer Bills, for the Service of the Year One thousand eight hundred and forty-three. (Repealed by Statute Law Revision Act 1874 (No. 2) (37 & 38 Vict. c. 96))
Parliamentary Voters Registration Act 1843 (repealed)	6 & 7 Vict. c. 18	31 May 1843
An Act to amend the Law for the Registration of Persons entitled to vote, and to define certain Rights of voting, and to regulate certain Proceedings in the Election of Members to serve in Parliament for England and Wales. (Repealed by Representation of the People Act 1949 (12, 13 & 14 Geo. 6. c. 68))
Thatched House Court and Little St. James's Street, Westminster Act 1843 (repealed)	6 & 7 Vict. c. 19	31 May 1843
An Act to empower the Commissioners of Her Majesty's Woods to appropriate to Building Purposes the Area of Thatched House Court, and to widen and improve Little Saint James' Street, in the Parish of Saint James Westminster. (Repealed by Statute Law (Repeals) Act 1978 (c. 45))
Court of Queen's Bench Act 1843 (repealed)	6 & 7 Vict. c. 20	31 May 1843
An Act for abolishing certain Offices on the Crown Side of the Court of Queen's Bench, and for regulating the Crown Office. (Repealed by Statute Law Revision Act 1891 (54 & 55 Vict. c. 67))
Turnpike Acts (Ireland) Act 1843 (repealed)	6 & 7 Vict. c. 21	31 May 1843
An Act to continue until the Thirty-first Day of July One thousand eight hundred and forty-four, and to the End of the then Session of Parliament, the several Acts for regulating Turnpike Roads in Ireland. (Repealed by Statute Law Revision Act 1874 (No. 2) (37 & 38 Vict. c. 96))
(Colonies) Evidence Act 1843 (repealed)	6 & 7 Vict. c. 22	31 May 1843
An Act to authorize the Legislatures of certain of Her Majesty's Colonies to pass Laws for the Admission, in certain Cases, of unsworn Testimony in Civil and Criminal Proceedings. (Repealed by Statute Law (Repeals) Act 1976 (c. 16))
Copyhold Act 1843 (repealed)	6 & 7 Vict. c. 23	27 June 1843
An Act to amend and explain an Act for the Commutation of certain Manorial Rights in respect of Lands of Copyhold and Customary Tenure, and in respect of other Lands subject to such Rights and for facilitating the Enfranchisement of such Lands, and for the Improvement of such Tenure. (Repealed by Copyhold Act 1894 (57 & 58 Vict. c. 46))
Land Tax, Assessed Tax, and Income Tax Act 1843 (repealed)	6 & 7 Vict. c. 24	27 June 1843
An Act to continue, until the Fifth Day of April One thousand eight hundred and forty-five, Compositions for Assessed Taxes, and to amend the Laws relating to the Land and Assessed Taxes, and also the Laws relating to the Duties on Profits arising from Property, Professions, Trades, and Offices. (Repealed by Taxes Management Act 1880 (43 & 44 Vict. c. 19))
Duchess of Mecklenburgh Strelitz's Annuity Act 1843 or the Annuity, Duchess of Mecklenburgh Strelitz Act 1843 or Princess Augusta's Annuity Act 1843 (repealed)	6 & 7 Vict. c. 25	27 June 1843
An Act to enable Her Majesty to settle an Annuity on Her Royal Highness the Princess Augusta Caroline, eldest Daughter of His Royal Highness the Duke of Cambridge. (Repealed by Statute Law Revision Act 1953 (2 & 3 Eliz. 2. c. 5))
Millbank Prison Act 1843 (repealed)	6 & 7 Vict. c. 26	27 June 1843
An Act for regulating the Prison at Millbank. (Repealed by Millbank Prison Act 1892 (55 & 56 Vict. c. 1))
Sugar Duties Act 1843 (repealed)	6 & 7 Vict. c. 27	4 July 1843
An Act for granting to Her Majesty, until the Fifth Day of July One thousand eight hundred and forty-four, certain Duties on Sugar imported into the United Kingdom, for the Service of the Year One thousand eight hundred and forty-three. (Repealed by Statute Law Revision Act 1874 (No. 2) (37 & 38 Vict. c. 96))
Parliamentary Elections (Ireland) Act 1843 (repealed)	6 & 7 Vict. c. 28	4 July 1843
An Act to abolish the Roman Catholic Oath as a Qualification for Voters at Elections in Ireland. (Repealed by Promissory Oaths Act 1871 (34 & 35 Vict. c. 48))
Duties on Wheat, etc. Act 1843 or the Canada Corn Act 1843 (repealed)	6 & 7 Vict. c. 29	12 July 1843
An Act for reducing the Duty on Wheat and Wheat Flour, the Produce of the Province of Canada, imported thence into the United Kingdom. (Repealed by Statute Law Revision Act 1861 (24 & 25 Vict. c. 101))
Pound-breach Act 1843 (repealed)	6 & 7 Vict. c. 30	12 July 1843
An Act to amend the Law relating to Pound-breach and Rescue in certain Cases. (Repealed by Statute Law (Repeals) Act 1993 (c. 50))
Chelsea Hospital Act 1843	6 & 7 Vict. c. 31	12 July 1843
An Act to enable the Commissioners of Chelsea Hospital to purchase certain Parcels of Land for the Benefit of the said Hospital, and for other Purposes.
Grand Juries (Ireland) Act 1843 (repealed)	6 & 7 Vict. c. 32	12 July 1843
An Act to amend the Laws in force relating to Grand Jury Presentments in Counties of Cities and Towns in Ireland. (Repealed by Local Government (Ireland) Act 1898 (61 & 62 Vict. c. 37))
Salmon Fisheries Act 1843 (repealed)	6 & 7 Vict. c. 33	28 July 1843
An Act to repeal so much of an Act of the First Year of King George the First (Note: Fish Act 1714 (1 Geo. 1. St. 2. c. 18)) as limits the Time for taking and being restrained from taking Salmon in certain Rivers; and to amend and extend the Provisions of an Act of the Fifty-eighth Year of King George the Third (Note: Salmon Fisheries (England) Act 1818 (58 Geo. 3. c. 43)) to the Rivers therein mentioned. (Repealed by Salmon Fishery Act 1861 (24 & 25 Vict. c. 109))
Apprehension of Offenders Act 1843 (repealed)	6 & 7 Vict. c. 34	28 July 1843
An Act for the better Apprehension of certain Offenders. (Repealed by Fugitive Offenders Act 1881 (44 & 45 Vict. c. 69))
Norfolk Island Act 1843 (repealed)	6 & 7 Vict. c. 35	28 July 1843
An Act to amend so much of an Act of the last Session, (Note: Australian Constitutions Act 1842 (5 & 6 Vict. c. 76)) for the Government of New South Wales and Van Diemen's Land, as relates to Norfolk Island. (Repealed by Statute Law Revision Act 1874 (No. 2) (37 & 38 Vict. c. 96))
Scientific Societies Act 1843 or the Scientific and Literary Societies Act 1843 (repealed)	6 & 7 Vict. c. 36	28 July 1843
An Act to exempt from County, Borough, Parochial, and other local Rates, Land and Buildings occupied by Scientific or Literary Societies. (Repealed for Scotland by Valuation and Rating (Scotland) Act 1956 (4 & 5 Eliz. 2. c. 60) and Local Government (Financial Provisions etc.) (Scotland) Act 1962 (10 & 11 Eliz. 2. c. 9) and for England and Wales by Rating and Valuation Act 1961 (9 & 10 Eliz. 2. c. 45))
New Parishes Act 1843 or the Spiritual Care of Populous Parishes Act 1843	6 & 7 Vict. c. 37	28 July 1843
An Act to make better Provision for the Spiritual Care of populous Parishes.
Judicial Committee Act 1843	6 & 7 Vict. c. 38	28 July 1843
An Act to make further Regulations for facilitating the hearing Appeals and other Matters by the Judicial Committee of the Privy Council.
Marriages Confirmation (Ireland) Act 1843 (repealed)	6 & 7 Vict. c. 39	28 July 1843
An Act for Confirmation of certain Marriages in Ireland. (Repealed by Statute Law (Repeals) Act 1977 (c. 18))
Hosiery Act 1843 (repealed)	6 & 7 Vict. c. 40	1 August 1843
An Act to amend the Laws for the Prevention of Frauds and Abuses by Persons employed in the Woollen, Worsted, Linen, Cotton, Flax, Mohair, and Silk Hosiery Manufactures; and for the further securing the Property of the Manufacturers and the Wages of the Workmen engaged therein. (Repealed by Statute Law (Repeals) Act 1993 (c. 50))
Loan Societies Act 1843 or the Charitable Loan Societies (Ireland) Act 1843 (repealed)	6 & 7 Vict. c. 41	1 August 1843
An Act to continue to the First Day of August One thousand eight hundred and forty-four, and to the End of the then Session of Parliament, the Act (Note: Loan Societies Act 1840 (3 & 4 Vict. c. 110)) to amend the Laws relating to Loan Societies. (Repealed by Statute Law Revision Act 1874 (No. 2) (37 & 38 Vict. c. 96))
Bridges (Ireland) Act 1843 (repealed)	6 & 7 Vict. c. 42	1 August 1843
An Act to amend an Act of the Nineteenth and Twentieth Years of King George the Third, (Note: Bridges Act 1779 (19 & 20 Geo. 3. c. 41 (I))) for empowering Grand Juries in Ireland to present Bridges, and Tolls to be paid for passing the same, in certain Cases. (Repealed by Statute Law Revision Act (Northern Ireland) 1954 (c. 35 (N.I.)))
Militia Ballots Suspension Act 1843 (repealed)	6 & 7 Vict. c. 43	10 August 1843
An Act to suspend until the Thirty-first Day of August One thousand eight hundred and forty-four the making of Lists and the Ballots and Enrolments for the Militia of the United Kingdom. (Repealed by Statute Law Revision Act 1874 (No. 2) (37 & 38 Vict. c. 96))
Public Works (Ireland) Act 1843 (repealed)	6 & 7 Vict. c. 44	10 August 1843
An Act to amend the Acts for carrying on Public Works in Ireland. (Repealed by Statute Law Revision Act 1891 (54 & 55 Vict. c. 67))
Usury Act 1843 (repealed)	6 & 7 Vict. c. 45	10 August 1843
An Act to continue, until the First Day of January One thousand eight hundred and forty-six, an Act (Note: Usury Act 1839 (2 & 3 Vict. c. 37)) for exempting certain Bills of Exchange and Promissory Notes from the Operation of the Laws relating to Usury. (Repealed by Statute Law Revision Act 1874 (No. 2) (37 & 38 Vict. c. 96))
Slave Trade (No. 1) Act 1843 (repealed)	6 & 7 Vict. c. 46	10 August 1843
An Act to continue until the First Day of August One thousand eight hundred and forty-four, and to the End of the then Session of Parliament, an Act (Note: Slave Trade Suppression (No. 2) Act 1838 (1 & 2 Vict. c. 102)) for authorizing Her Majesty to carry into immediate Execution by Orders in Council any Treaties for the Suppression of the Slave Trade. (Repealed by Slave Trade Act 1873 (36 & 37 Vict. c. 88))
Controverted Elections Act 1843 (repealed)	6 & 7 Vict. c. 47	10 August 1843
An Act to continue until the First Day of August One thousand eight hundred and forty-four, and to the End of the then Session of Parliament, an Act (Note: Controverted Elections Act 1841 (4 & 5 Vict. c. 58)) for amending the Law for the Trial of controverted Elections. (Repealed by Statute Law Revision Act 1874 (No. 2) (37 & 38 Vict. c. 96))
Poor Rates Act 1843 (repealed)	6 & 7 Vict. c. 48	10 August 1843
An Act to continue, until the First Day of October One thousand eight hundred and forty-four, the Exemption of Inhabitants of Parishes, Townships, and Villages from Liability to be rated as such, in respect of Stock in Trade or other Property, to the Relief of the Poor. (Repealed by Statute Law Revision Act 1874 (No. 2) (37 & 38 Vict. c. 96))
Duties on Spirits Act 1843 (repealed)	6 & 7 Vict. c. 49	10 August 1843
An Act to reduce the Duty on Spirits in Ireland, and to impose other countervailing Duties and Drawbacks on the Removal of certain Mixtures and Compounds between Ireland, England, and Scotland respectively. (Repealed by Statute Law Revision Act 1874 (No. 2) (37 & 38 Vict. c. 96))
Slave Trade Treaties Act 1843 (repealed)	6 & 7 Vict. c. 50	10 August 1843
An Act for carrying into execution a Treaty signed at London for the Suppression of the Slave Trade, so far as the same relates to Great Britain, Austria, Prussia, and Russia. (Repealed by Slave Trade Act 1873 (36 & 37 Vict. c. 88))
Slave Trade Treaty with Mexico Act 1843 (repealed)	6 & 7 Vict. c. 51	10 August 1843
An Act for carrying into effect the Treaty between Her Majesty and the Mexican Republic for the Abolition of the Traffic in Slaves. (Repealed by Slave Trade Act 1873 (36 & 37 Vict. c. 88))
Slave Trade Treaties with Chile Act 1843 (repealed)	6 & 7 Vict. c. 52	10 August 1843
An Act for carrying into effect the Treaty between Her Majesty and the Republic of Chile for the Abolition of the Traffic in Slaves. (Repealed by Slave Trade Act 1873 (36 & 37 Vict. c. 88))
Slave Trade Treaties with Portugal Act 1843 (repealed)	6 & 7 Vict. c. 53	10 August 1843
An Act for carrying into effect the Treaty between Her Majesty and the Queen of Portugal for the Suppression of the Traffic in Slaves. (Repealed by Slave Trade Act 1873 (36 & 37 Vict. c. 88))
Limitation of Actions Act 1843 or the Limitation of Action Act 1843 (repealed)	6 & 7 Vict. c. 54	10 August 1843
An Act for extending to Ireland the Provisions not already in force there of an Act of the Third and Fourth Years of the Reign of the late King William the Fourth, intituled "An Act for the Limitation of Actions and Suits relating to Real Property, and for simplifying the Remedies for trying the Eights thereto;" (Note: Real Property Limitation Act 1833 (3 & 4 Will. 4. c. 27)) and to explain and amend the said Act. (Repealed by Statute Law Revision Act 1874 (37 & 38 Vict. c. 35), Statute Law Revision Act 1891 (54 & 55 Vict. c. 67), Statute Law Revision (No. 2) Act 1893 (56 & 57 Vict. c. 54), Limitation Act 1939 (2 & 3 Geo. 6. c. 21) and Statute Law Revision Act 1953 (2 & 3 Eliz. 2. c. 5))
Exchequer Court (Ireland) Act 1843 (repealed)	6 & 7 Vict. c. 55	17 August 1843
An Act for the Amendment of the Proceedings and Practice of the Equity Side of the Court of Exchequer in Ireland. (Repealed by Statute Law Revision Act 1874 (No. 2) (37 & 38 Vict. c. 96))
Fines, etc. (Ireland) Act 1843 (repealed)	6 & 7 Vict. c. 56	17 August 1843
An Act for the better Collection of Fines, Penalties, Issues, Deodands, Amerciaments, and forfeited Recognizances in Ireland, and for the Appropriation thereof. (Repealed by Fines Act (Ireland) 1851 (14 & 15 Vict. c. 90))
Relief of Certain Bishops (Ireland) Act 1843 (repealed)	6 & 7 Vict. c. 57	17 August 1843
An Act to relieve Bishops succeeding to Bishoprics by Operation of the Act (Note: Church Temporalities (Ireland) Act 1833 (3 & 4 Will. 4. c. 37)) to alter and amend the Laws relating to the Temporalities of the Church in Ireland from certain Liabilities. (Repealed by Statute Law Revision Act 1892 (55 & 56 Vict. c. 19))
Admiralty Lands Act 1843 (repealed)	6 & 7 Vict. c. 58	17 August 1843
An Act to enable Her Majesty to acquire Lands for the Enlargement of Her Majesty's Dock Yards, and for other Naval Purposes. (Repealed by Admiralty, &c. Acts Repeal Act 1865 (28 & 29 Vict. c. 112))
Highway Rates Act 1843 (repealed)	6 & 7 Vict. c. 59	17 August 1843
An Act to continue until the First Day of August One thousand eight hundred and forty-four, and, if Parliament be then sitting, to the End of the then next Session of Parliament, an Act (Note: Application of Highway Rates to Turnpikes Act 1841 (4 & 5 Vict. c. 59)) for authorizing the Application of Highway Rates to Turnpike Roads. (Repealed by Statute Law Revision Act 1874 (No. 2) (37 & 38 Vict. c. 96))
Ecclesiastical Jurisdiction Act 1843 (repealed)	6 & 7 Vict. c. 60	17 August 1843
An Act for suspending, until the First Day of October One thousand eight hundred and forty-four, the Operation of the new Arrangement of Dioceses, so far as it affects the existing Ecclesiastical Jurisdictions. (Repealed by Statute Law Revision Act 1874 (No. 2) (37 & 38 Vict. c. 96))
Benefices (Scotland) Act 1843 (repealed)	6 & 7 Vict. c. 61	17 August 1843
An Act to remove Doubts respecting the Admission of Ministers to Benefices in that Part of the United Kingdom called Scotland. (Repealed by Church Patronage (Scotland) Act 1874 (37 & 38 Vict. c. 82))
Incapacitated Bishops Act 1843 (repealed)	6 & 7 Vict. c. 62	22 August 1843
An Act to provide for the Performance of the Episcopal Functions in case of the Incapacity of any Bishop or Archbishop. (Repealed by Bishops Resignation Act 1869 (32 & 33 Vict. c. 111))
West Indies Relief Act 1843 (repealed)	6 & 7 Vict. c. 63	22 August 1843
An Act for granting Relief to the Islands of Antigua, Saint Kitts, Nevis, Dominica, and Montserrat. (Repealed by Statute Law Revision Act 1874 (No. 2) (37 & 38 Vict. c. 96))
Keeper of Holyrood Park, etc. Act 1843	6 & 7 Vict. c. 64	22 August 1843
An Act for carrying into effect an Agreement between the Commissioners of Her Majesty's Woods and the Earl of Haddington, for the Purchase and Surrender of the Office of Hereditary Keeper of the Royal Park of Holyrood House; and for other Purposes relating thereto.
Copyright of Designs Act 1843 (repealed)	6 & 7 Vict. c. 65	22 August 1843
An Act to amend the Laws relating to the Copyright of Designs. (Repealed by Patents, Designs, and Trade Marks Act 1883 (46 & 47 Vict. c. 57))
Warrants of Attorney Act 1843 (repealed)	6 & 7 Vict. c. 66	22 August 1843
An Act to enlarge the Provisions of an Act (Note: Warrants of Attorney Act 1822 (3 Geo. 4. c. 39)) for preventing Frauds upon Creditors by secret Warrants of Attorney to confess Judgment. (Repealed by Administration of Justice Act 1956 (4 & 5 Eliz. 2. c. 46))
Writs of Mandamus Act 1843 (repealed)	6 & 7 Vict. c. 67	22 August 1843
An Act to enable Parties to sue out and prosecute Writs of Error in certain Cases upon the Proceedings on Writs of Mandamus. (Repealed by Statute Law Revision and Civil Procedure Act 1883 (46 & 47 Vict. c. 49))
Theatres Act 1843 or the Theatre Regulation Act 1843 (repealed)	6 & 7 Vict. c. 68	22 August 1843
An Act for regulating Theatres. (Repealed by Theatres Act 1968 (c. 54))
Turnpike Acts 1843 (repealed)	6 & 7 Vict. c. 69	22 August 1843
An Act to continue until the First Day of August One thousand eight hundred and forty-four, and to the End of the then next Session of Parliament, certain Turnpike Acts. (Repealed by Statute Law Revision Act 1874 (No. 2) (37 & 38 Vict. c. 96))
Militia Pay Act 1843 (repealed)	6 & 7 Vict. c. 70	22 August 1843
An Act to defray, until the First Day of August One thousand eight hundred and forty-four, the Charge of the Pay, Clothing, and contingent and other Expences of the Disembodied Militia in Great Britain and Ireland; to grant Allowances in certain Cases to Subaltern Officers, Adjutants, Paymasters, Quartermasters, Surgeons, Assistant Surgeons, Surgeons Mates, and Serjeant Majors of the Militia; and to authorize the Employment of the Non-commissioned Officers. (Repealed by Statute Law Revision Act 1874 (No. 2) (37 & 38 Vict. c. 96))
Grand Jury Presentments (Ireland) Act 1843 (repealed)	6 & 7 Vict. c. 71	22 August 1843
An Act to make further Provision in respect of Grand Jury Presentments in Counties of Cities and Counties of Towns in Ireland. (Repealed by Statute Law Revision Act 1874 (No. 2) (37 & 38 Vict. c. 96))
Stamps Act 1843 (repealed)	6 & 7 Vict. c. 72	22 August 1843
An Act to impose certain Stamp Duties, and to amend the Laws relating thereto. (Repealed by Inland Revenue Repeal Act 1870 (33 & 34 Vict. c. 99))
Solicitors Act 1843 (repealed)	6 & 7 Vict. c. 73	22 August 1843
An Act for consolidating and amending several of the Laws relating to Attornies and Solicitors practising in England and Wales. (Repealed by Solicitors Act 1932 (22 & 23 Geo. 5. c. 37))
Arms, etc. (Ireland) Act 1843 (repealed)	6 & 7 Vict. c. 74	22 August 1843
An Act to amend, and continue for Two Years, and to the End of the then next Session of Parliament, the Laws in Ireland relative to the registering of Arms, and the Importation, Manufacture, and Sale of Arms, Gunpowder, and Ammunition. (Repealed by Statute Law Revision Act 1874 (No. 2) (37 & 38 Vict. c. 96))
Extradition (France) Act 1843 (repealed)	6 & 7 Vict. c. 75	22 August 1843
An Act for giving effect to a Convention between Her Majesty and the King of the French for the Apprehension of certain Offenders. (Repealed by Extradition Act 1870 (33 & 34 Vict. c. 52))
Extradition (United States) Act 1843 (repealed)	6 & 7 Vict. c. 76	22 August 1843
An Act for giving effect to a Treaty between Her Majesty and the United States of America for the Apprehension of certain Offenders. (Repealed by Extradition Act 1870 (33 & 34 Vict. c. 52))
Welsh Cathedrals Act 1843 (repealed)	6 & 7 Vict. c. 77	22 August 1843
An Act for regulating the Cathedral Churches of Wales. (Repealed by Statute Law (Repeals) Act 1977 (c. 18))
Exchequer Court (Ireland) (No. 2) Act 1843 (repealed)	6 & 7 Vict. c. 78	22 August 1843
An Act for the further Regulation of the Offices of Chief and Second Remembrancer of the Court of Exchequer in Ireland. (Repealed by Statute Law Revision Act 1874 (No. 2) (37 & 38 Vict. c. 96))
Sea Fisheries Act 1843 (repealed)	6 & 7 Vict. c. 79	22 August 1843
An Act to carry into effect a Convention between Her Majesty and the King of the French concerning the Fisheries in the Seas between the British Islands and France. (Repealed by Fishery Limits Act 1964 (c. 72))
British Subjects in China Act 1843 (repealed)	6 & 7 Vict. c. 80	22 August 1843
An Act for the better Government of Her Majesty's Subjects resorting to China. (Repealed by Foreign Jurisdiction Act 1878 (41 & 42 Vict. c. 67))
Session of the Peace, Dublin Act 1843 (repealed)	6 & 7 Vict. c. 81	22 August 1843
An Act to make better Provision for the Appointment of a Deputy for the Chairman of the Sessions of the Peace in the County of Dublin, and to provide for the taking of an Oath by the said Chairman or Deputy; and to amend an Act of the First Year of Her present Majesty, (Note: Small Debts' Recovery (Ireland) Act 1837 (7 Will. 4 & 1 Vict. c. 43)) to amend the Law for the Recovery of Small Debts by Civil Bill in Ireland. (Repealed by Civil Bill Courts (Ireland) Act 1851 (14 & 15 Vict. c. 57))
Evidence by Commission Act 1843 (repealed)	6 & 7 Vict. c. 82	22 August 1843
An Act for amending the Law relating to Commissions for the Examination of Witnesses. (Repealed by Statute Law Revision Act 1963 (c. 30))
Coroners (No. 2) Act 1843 (repealed)	6 & 7 Vict. c. 83	22 August 1843
An Act to amend the Law respecting the Duties of Coroners. (Repealed by Coroners Act 1887 (50 & 51 Vict. c. 71))
Customs Act 1843 (repealed)	6 & 7 Vict. c. 84	22 August 1843
An Act to amend the Laws relating to the Customs. (Repealed by Customs (Repeal) Act 1845 (8 & 9 Vict. c. 84))
Evidence Act 1843 (repealed)	6 & 7 Vict. c. 85	22 August 1843
An Act for improving the Law of Evidence. (Repealed by Statute Law (Repeals) Act 1986 (c. 12))
London Hackney Carriages Act 1843	6 & 7 Vict. c. 86	22 August 1843
An Act for regulating Hackney and Stage Carriages in and near London.
Supply (No. 2) Act 1843 (repealed)	6 & 7 Vict. c. 87	24 August 1843
An Act for raising the Sum of Eleven millions one hundred and thirty-two thousand one hundred Pounds by Exchequer Bills, for the Service of the Year One thousand eight hundred and forty-three; and for amending an Act (Note: West Indies Relief Act 1843 (6 & 7 Vict. c. 63)) for granting Relief to certain Islands in the West Indies. (Repealed by Statute Law Revision Act 1874 (No. 2) (37 & 38 Vict. c. 96))
Church at Limerick Act 1843	6 & 7 Vict. c. 88	22 August 1843
An Act for the Completion of a Parochial Church in the Parish of Saint Michael in the City of Limerick, and for securing the Nomination of a Perpetual Curate thereto.
Municipal Corporations (England) Act 1843 (repealed)	6 & 7 Vict. c. 89	24 August 1843
An Act to amend the Act (Note: Municipal Corporations Act 1835 (5 & 6 Will. 4. c. 76)) for the Regulation of Municipal Corporations in England and Wales. (Repealed by Municipal Corporations Act 1882 (45 & 46 Vict. c. 50))
Public Notaries Act 1843	6 & 7 Vict. c. 90	24 August 1843
An Act for removing Doubts as to the Service of Clerks or Apprentices to Public Notaries, and for amending the Laws regulating the Admission of Public Notaries. (Repealed for the Isle of Man by Statute Law (Repeals) Act 1998 (c. 43))
Charitable Loan Societies (Ireland) Act 1843 (repealed)	6 & 7 Vict. c. 91	24 August 1843
An Act to consolidate and amend the Laws for the Regulation of Charitable Loan Societies in Ireland. (Repealed by Finance (Miscellaneous Provisions) Act (Northern Ireland) 1955 (c. 19 (N.I.)))
Poor Relief (Ireland) Act 1843	6 & 7 Vict. c. 92	24 August 1843
An Act for the further Amendment of an Act (Note: Poor Relief (Ireland) Act 1838 (1 & 2 Vict. c. 56)) for the more effectual Relief of the destitute Poor in Ireland.
Municipal Corporations (Ireland) Act 1843 (repealed)	6 & 7 Vict. c. 93	24 August 1843
An Act to amend an Act of the Third and Fourth Years of Her present Majesty (Note: Municipal Corporations (Ireland) Act 1840 (3 & 4 Vict. c. 108)) for the Regulation of Municipal Corporations in Ireland. (Repealed by Local Government Act (Northern Ireland) 1972 (c. 9 (N.I.)))
Foreign Jurisdiction Act 1843 (repealed)	6 & 7 Vict. c. 94	24 August 1843
An Act to remove Doubts as to the Exercise of Power and Jurisdiction by Her Majesty within divers Countries and Places out of Her Majesty's Dominions, and to render the same more effectual. (Repealed by Foreign Jurisdiction Act 1890 (53 & 54 Vict. c. 37))
Chelsea Hospital Out-pensioners Act 1843 (repealed)	6 & 7 Vict. c. 95	24 August 1843
An Act for rendering more effective the Services of such Out-Pensioners of Chelsea Hospital as shall be called out to assist in preserving the Public Peace. (Repealed by Reserve Force Act 1867 (30 & 31 Vict. c. 110))
Libel Act 1843 or Lord Campbell's Libel Act	6 & 7 Vict. c. 96	24 August 1843
An Act to amend the Law respecting defamatory Words and Libel.
Sudbury Bribery Commission Act 1843 (repealed)	6 & 7 Vict. c. 97	24 August 1843
An Act for appointing Commissioners to inquire into the Existence of Bribery in the Borough of Sudbury. (Repealed by Statute Law Revision Act 1874 (No. 2) (37 & 38 Vict. c. 96))
Slave Trade Act 1843	6 & 7 Vict. c. 98	24 August 1843
An Act for the more effectual Suppression of the Slave Trade.
Appropriation Act 1843 (repealed)	6 & 7 Vict. c. 99	24 August 1843
An Act to apply a Sum out of the Consolidated Fund, and certain other Sums, to the Service of the Year One thousand eight hundred and forty-three, and to appropriate the Supplies granted in this Session of Parliament. (Repealed by Statute Law Revision Act 1874 (No. 2) (37 & 38 Vict. c. 96))

=== Local acts ===
Short title	Citation	Royal assent
Long title
Cambrian Iron and Spelter Company Act 1843	6 & 7 Vict. c. i	3 April 1843
An Act for regulating legal Proceedings by or against "The Cambrian Iron and Spelter Company," and for granting certain Powers thereto.
Nottingham Street Lighting Act 1843 (repealed)	6 & 7 Vict. c. ii	3 April 1843
An Act for lighting the Streets and public Roads within the Town and County of the Town of Nottingham. (Repealed by Nottingham Improvement Act 1874 (37 & 38 Vict. c. cxciv))
Warwick and Leamington Union Railway Act 1843 (repealed)	6 & 7 Vict. c. iii	3 April 1843
An Act to authorize certain Alterations in the Works of the Warwick and Leamington Union Railway, and to confirm the Purchase thereof by the London and Birmingham, Railway Company, and to enable that Company to raise a further Sum of Money, and to convert their Shares into Stock. (Repealed by London and North Western Railway Act 1846 (9 & 10 Vict. c. cciv))
Lancaster and Preston Junction Railway Act 1843	6 & 7 Vict. c. iv	3 April 1843
An Act to amend the Acts relating to the Lancaster and Preston Junction Railway.
Severn Navigation Act 1843	6 & 7 Vict. c. v	3 April 1843
An Act to enable the Company of Proprietors of the Staffordshire and Worcestershire Canal Navigation to lend certain Sums of Money to the Commissioners for the Improvement of the Navigation of the River Severn, and to guarantee the Repayment of the Amount of any Loans which any other Persons or Bodies shall make to such Commissioners, and to guarantee the Performance of Contracts into which such Commissioners shall enter, and to borrow Money for such Purposes.
River Thames (Bercot to Oxford) Navigation Act 1843	6 & 7 Vict. c. vi	11 April 1843
An Act for authorizing the Sale and Application of certain Property vested in the Commissioners for making the River Thames navigable from Bercot in the County of Oxford to the University and City of Oxford.
Hull and Selby Railway Act 1843	6 & 7 Vict. c. vii	11 April 1843
An Act to enable "The Hull and Selby Railway Company" to raise a further Sum of Money; and to amend the Act (Note: Hull and Selby Railway Act 1836 (6 & 7 Will. 4. c. lxxx)) relating to the said Railway.
Great North of England Railway Act 1843	6 & 7 Vict. c. viii	11 April 1843
An Act to authorize certain Alterations in a Portion of the Line of the Great North of England Railway, and for vesting the same in the Newcastle and Darlington Junction Railway Company.
Sheffield, Ashton-under-Lyne and Manchester Railway Act 1843 (repealed)	6 & 7 Vict. c. ix	11 April 1843
An Act to increase the Capital of the Sheffield, Ashton-under-Lyne, and Manchester Railway Company, and to alter and enlarge the Powers of the said Company. (Repealed by Manchester, Sheffield and Lincolnshire Railway Act 1849 (12 & 13 Vict. c. lxxxi))
Oxford Railway Act 1843	6 & 7 Vict. c. x	11 April 1843
An Act for making a Railway from the Great Western Railway to the City of Oxford.
Chepstow Water Company Act 1843 (repealed)	6 & 7 Vict. c. xi	11 April 1843
An Act for better supplying with Water the Town and Parish of Chepstow, and the Parish of Saint Arvans adjoining thereto, all in the County of Monmouth. (Repealed by Newport and South Monmouthshire Water Board Order 1960 (SI 1960/161))
Carmarthen Markets Act 1843 (repealed)	6 & 7 Vict. c. xii	11 April 1843
An Act for removing the present Markets held in the County of the Borough of Carmarthen, and for providing other Market Places, and regulating the Markets to be held therein. (Repealed by Dyfed Act 1987 (c. xxiv))
Birkenhead Extension Act 1843 (repealed)	6 & 7 Vict. c. xiii	11 April 1843
An Act for extending the Powers of the Commissioners of the Township of Birkenhead in the County of Chester, and for including the Township of Claughton-cum-Grange and Part of the Township of Oxton in the same County within their Jurisdiction. (Repealed by Birkenhead Corporation Act 1881 (44 & 45 Vict. c. cliii))
Bolton Gas Light and Coke Company Act 1843 (repealed)	6 & 7 Vict. c. xiv	11 April 1843
An Act for more effectually lighting with Gas the Borough of Bolton, and certain Places adjacent thereto, in the County of Lancaster. (Repealed by Bolton Gas Company's Act 1854 (17 & 18 Vict. c. xx))
Lancaster Lunatic Asylum Act 1843 (repealed)	6 & 7 Vict. c. xv	11 April 1843
An Act for providing additional Grounds to the Lunatic Asylum of the County Palatine of Lancaster. (Repealed by County of Lancashire Act 1984 (c. xxi))
Roads from Cockermouth to Maryport Act 1843	6 & 7 Vict. c. xvi	11 April 1843
An Act for more effectually repairing the Road from the Town of Cockermouth to the Town of Maryport, and other Roads therein mentioned, and for making a Branch Road connected therewith, all in the County of Cumberland.
Manchester Corporation Powers Act 1843 (repealed)	6 & 7 Vict. c. xvii	9 May 1843
An Act for transferring to the Mayor, Aldermen, and Burgesses of the Borough of Manchester certain Powers and Property now vested in the Commissioners for cleansing, lighting, watching, and regulating the Town of Manchester. (Repealed by Manchester General Improvement Act 1851 (14 & 15 Vict. c. cxix))
Cromford and High Peak Railway Act 1843 (repealed)	6 & 7 Vict. c. xviii	9 May 1843
An Act for enabling the Cromford and High Peak Railway Company to grant Mortgages for Part of their floating Debts; and for amending the Act (Note: Cromford and High Peak Railway Act 1825 (6 Geo. 4. c. xxx)) relating to such Railway. (Repealed by Cromford and High Peak Railway Act 1855 (18 & 19 Vict. c. lxxv))
Hungerford and Lambeth Suspension Foot Bridge Company Act 1843	6 & 7 Vict. c. xix	9 May 1843
An Act to amend an Act (Note: Hungerford Market Foot Bridge Act 1836 (6 & 7 Will. 4. c. cxxxiii)) relating to the building of the Hungerford and Lambeth Suspension Foot Bridge; and for granting further Powers to the Hungerford and Lambeth Suspension Foot Bridge Company.
Ipswich Dock Act 1843 (repealed)	6 & 7 Vict. c. xx	9 May 1843
An Act to enlarge the Powers of the Ipswich Dock Commissioners. (Repealed by Ipswich Port Authority Act 1986 (c. xv))
Brighton and Hove General Gas Company Act 1843 (repealed)	6 & 7 Vict. c. xxi	9 May 1843
An Act to amend an Act of the Second Year of Her present Majesty's Reign, (Note: Brighton Gas Act 1839 (2 & 3 Vict. c. xxxviii)) for better lighting with Gas the Town of Brighton, and the several Places therein mentioned, in the County of Sussex. (Repealed by Brighton and Hove Gas Act 1930 (20 & 21 Geo. 5. c. cxxviii))
Imperial Continental Gas Association Act 1843 (repealed)	6 & 7 Vict. c. xxii	9 May 1843
An Act for granting further Powers to the Imperial Continental Gas Association. (Repealed by Imperial Continental Gas Association Act 1853 (16 & 17 Vict. c. cxc))
St. Helens Waterworks Company Act 1843 (repealed)	6 & 7 Vict. c. xxiii	9 May 1843
An Act for better supplying with Water the Town of Saint Helens and several Hamlets and Places adjacent thereto, all in the Parish of Prescot in the County Palatine of Lancaster. (Repealed by County of Merseyside Act 1980 (c. x))
Birkenhead and Claughton-cum-Grange Cemetery Act 1843	6 & 7 Vict. c. xxiv	9 May 1843
An Act for establishing a Cemetery in Birkenhead and Claughton-cum-Grange, or One of them, in the County of Chester.
Schoolmasters' Widows' and Children's Relief Fund (Scotland) Act 1843 (repealed)	6 & 7 Vict. c. xxv	9 May 1843
An Act for better raising and securing the Fund for the Relief of Widows and Children of Burgh and Parochial Schoolmasters in Scotland. (Repealed by Parish Schoolmasters' Dependents (Scotland) Act 1846 (9 & 10 Vict. c. ccxxvi))
Trentham and Stone Roads Act 1843 or the Staffordshire Roads Act 1843	6 & 7 Vict. c. xxvi	9 May 1843
An Act for repairing and improving certain Roads in the Neighbourhood of Trentham and Stone in the County of Stafford, and for making and maintaining a new Road from Trentham Inn to the Newcastle-under-Lyme and Market Drayton Turnpike Road in the same County, and another new Piece of Road in the Parish of Trentham aforesaid.
London and Brighton Railway Act 1843	6 & 7 Vict. c. xxvii	31 May 1843
An Act to enable the London and Brighton Railway Company to raise a further Sum of Money; and for altering and amending the Act (Note: London and Brighton Railway Act 1837 (7 Will. 4 & 1 Vict. c. cxix)) relating to such Railway.
Northern and Eastern Railway Act 1843 or the Northern and Eastern Railway (Newport Extension) Act 1843	6 & 7 Vict. c. xxviii	31 May 1843
An Act to enable the Northern and Eastern Railway Company to make an Extension of their present Railway; and to alter and amend the Acts relating to the said Railway.
Faversham Creek Navigation Act 1843 (repealed)	6 & 7 Vict. c. xxix	31 May 1843
An Act to extend the Powers and Provisions of an Act passed in the last Session of Parliament, intituled "An Act for improving the Navigation of Faversham Creek in the County of Kent." (Note: Faversham Creek Navigation Act 1842 (5 & 6 Vict. c. xlii)) (Repealed by Medway Ports Authority Act 1973 (c. xxi))
Leeds Gas Light Company Act 1843 (repealed)	6 & 7 Vict. c. xxx	31 May 1843
An Act to alter, amend, and enlarge the Powers and Provisions of an Act (Note: Leeds Gas Act 1818 (58 Geo. 3. c. lvi)) for lighting with Gas the Town and Neighbourhood of Leeds in the Borough of Leeds in the West Riding of the County of York. (Repealed by Leeds Gaslight Company Act 1853 (16 & 17 Vict. c. xlv))
Newport (Monmouthshire) Gas Company Act 1843 (repealed)	6 & 7 Vict. c. xxxi	31 May 1843
An Act for better lighting with Gas the Town and Borough of Newport in the County of Monmouth. (Repealed by Newport (Monmouthshire) Gas Act 1855 (18 & 19 Vict. c. lxxx))
Preston Waterworks Act 1843	6 & 7 Vict. c. xxxii	31 May 1843
An Act to enable "The Company of Proprietors of the Preston Waterworks" to raise a further Sum or Sums of Money; to alter and amend the Act (Note: Preston and Fishwick Water Act 1832 (2 & 3 Will. 4. c. xxvii)) incorporating the said Company, and to extend and enlarge their Powers.
Norland Estate Improvement Act 1843 (repealed)	6 & 7 Vict. c. xxxiii	31 May 1843
An Act for the Improvement of the Norland Estate in the Parish of Saint Mary Abbotts Kensington in the County of Middlesex. (Repealed by Kensington Improvement Act 1851 (14 & 15 Vict. c. cxvi))
Bethnal Green and Shoreditch Improvement Act 1843 (repealed)	6 & 7 Vict. c. xxxiv	31 May 1843
An Act for making farther Provision for paving, lighting, cleansing, regulating, repairing, and improving the Streets, Highways, and other public Places in the Parish of Saint Matthew Bethnal Green, and for paving such Parts of Old Cock Lane and York Street as are in the Parish of Saint Leonard Shoreditch in the County of Middlesex. (Repealed by London Government (Borough of Shoreditch) Order in Council 1901 (SR&O 1901/221))
Portsea Improvement Act 1843 (repealed)	6 & 7 Vict. c. xxxv	31 May 1843
An Act for paving, cleansing, watering, regulating, and otherwise improving the Town of Portsea in the County of Southampton, and for removing and preventing Nuisances and Annoyances therein. (Repealed by Portsmouth Corporation Act 1920 (10 & 11 Geo. 5. c. lxviii))
London Cemetery Company Act 1843	6 & 7 Vict. c. xxxvi	31 May 1843
An Act for amending the Act (Note: London Cemetery Company Act 1836 (6 & 7 Will. 4. c. cxxxvi)) establishing the London Cemetery Company.
Lincolnshire Fens Drainage Act 1843	6 & 7 Vict. c. xxxvii	31 May 1843
An Act for altering, amending and enlarging the Powers and Provisions of an Act (Note: Bourne Drainage Act 1841 (4 & 5 Vict. c. cxiii)) passed in Her present Majesty's reign, for the better Drainage of Lands in Bourn North Eau and Dyke Fen, in the Manor and Parish of Bourn, in the County of Lincoln, and for other Purposes concerning the Drainage of the same Lands.
Anderton Carrying Company Act 1843	6 & 7 Vict. c. xxxviii	31 May 1843
An Act for regulating Legal Proceedings by or against the Anderton Carrying Company.
Glasgow and Lanark Road Act 1843 (repealed)	6 & 7 Vict. c. xxxix	31 May 1843
An Act for more effectually maintaining, improving and repairing the Road leading from the south end of the New Bridge of Glasgow, by or near Parkhouse, to Three-Mile House, in the county of Lanark. (Repealed by Glasgow, Renfrew and Three Mile House Turnpike Roads Act 1872 (35 & 36 Vict. c. xxv))
Scarborough Harbour Act 1843	6 & 7 Vict. c. xl	27 June 1843
An Act for amending the several Acts relating to the Harbour of Scarborough, in the North Riding of the County of York, and for improving the said Harbour.
Wexford Harbour Act 1843 (repealed)	6 & 7 Vict. c. xli	27 June 1843
An Act for improving, maintaining and regulating the Harbour of Wexford, in the County of Wexford. (Repealed by Wexford Harbour Act 1874 (37 & 38 Vict. c. xl))
Pile Pier Act 1843 (repealed)	6 & 7 Vict. c. xlii	27 June 1843
An Act for erecting and maintaining a Pier in Pile Harbour, in the Parish of Dalton-in-Furness, in the County Palatine of Lancaster. (Repealed by Furness Railway Act 1855 (18 & 19 Vict. c. clxxiii))
Liskeard and Caradon Railway Act 1843	6 & 7 Vict. c. xliii	27 June 1843
An Act for making a Railway from Lamellion Bridge, in the Parish of Liskeard, to Tokenbury Corner, in the Parish of Linkinhorne, with a Branch Railway from Crow's Nest to Cheesewring, all in the County of Cornwall.
Merthyr Tydfil Justices of the Peace Act 1843 or the Merthyr Tydfil Stipendiary Magistrate Act 1843 (repealed)	6 & 7 Vict. c. xliv	27 June 1843
An Act to provide for the more effectual Execution of the Office of a Justice of the Peace within the Parish of Merthyr Tidvil, and certain adjoining Parishes. (Repealed by Mid Glamorgan County Council Act 1987 (c. vii))
Saltcoats Harbour Improvements Act 1843	6 & 7 Vict. c. xlv	27 June 1843
An Act for further improving and maintaining the Harbour of Saltcoats, in the County of Ayr.
Clarence Railway Company Act 1843	6 & 7 Vict. c. xlvi	27 June 1843
An Act for enabling the Clarence Railway Company to make an Issue of new Shares, and for otherwise altering and amending, enlarging and extending some of the Provisions of the Acts relating to the said Railway.
River Forth Navigation Act 1843	6 & 7 Vict. c. xlvii	27 June 1843
An Act for improving and regulating the Navigation of the River Forth from Alloa to Stirling, and Works connected therewith, and for other Purposes relating thereto.
Dundalk and Bannbridge Road (Northern Division) Act 1843 (repealed)	6 & 7 Vict. c. xlviii	27 June 1843
An Act for repairing the Road from Dundalk, in the County of Louth, to Bannbridge, in the County of Down, so far as relates to the Northern Division of the said Road. (Repealed by Turnpike Trusts Abolition (Ireland) Act 1857 (20 & 21 Vict. c. 16))
Glasgow, Paisley and Greenock Railway Act 1843	6 & 7 Vict. c. xlix	27 June 1843
An Act to amend the Acts relating to the Glasgow, Paisley and Greenock Railway Company, and to grant further Powers to the said Company.
Ballochney Railway Act 1843	6 & 7 Vict. c. l	27 June 1843
An Act to enable the Ballochney Railway Company to make and maintain certain new Works, and in some respects to alter and amend the Provisions of the Acts relating to the said Railway.
South Eastern Railway (Dover Extension) Act 1843	6 & 7 Vict. c. li	27 June 1843
An Act to enable the South-eastern Railway Company to extend the Line of their Railway into the Town of Dover, and to confer other Powers and Privileges on the said Company.
South Eastern Railway (Maidstone Branch) Act 1843	6 & 7 Vict. c. lii	27 June 1843
An Act to enable the South-eastern Railway Company to make a Branch Railway to the Town of Maidstone.
Birmingham and Gloucester Railway Act 1843	6 & 7 Vict. c. liii	27 June 1843
An Act to enable the Birmingham and Gloucester Birmingham Railway Company to raise a further Sum of Money, and for amending the Acts relating to the said Company.
Bristol and Gloucester Railway Act 1843	6 & 7 Vict. c. liv	27 June 1843
An Act for amending the Acts relating to the Bristol and Gloucester Railway, and for making a Branch Railway out of the same.
Edinburgh and Glasgow Union Canal Company Act 1843	6 & 7 Vict. c. lv	27 June 1843
An Act for amending the Acts for making and maintaining the Edinburgh and Glasgow Union Canal, and for conferring further Powers on the Company of Proprietors thereof.
Belfast Port and Harbour Act 1843 (repealed)	6 & 7 Vict. c. lvi	27 June 1843
An Act to amend two several Acts for improving the Port and Harbour of Belfast. (Repealed by Belfast Harbour Act 1847 (10 & 11 Vict. c. lii))
Thames Lastage and Ballastage Act 1843	6 & 7 Vict. c. lvii	27 June 1843
An Act for the Regulation of Lastage and Ballastage in the River Thames.
Glasgow Gas Act 1843 (repealed)	6 & 7 Vict. c. lviii	27 June 1843
An Act for the better supplying and lighting with Gas the City and Suburbs of Glasgow, and Places adjacent, and for other Purposes relating thereto. (Repealed by Glasgow City and Suburban Gas Company Act 1857 (20 & 21 Vict. c. lxxx))
Leamington Priors Improvement Act 1843 (repealed)	6 & 7 Vict. c. lix	27 June 1843
An Act for amending and enlarging the Power and Provisions of an Act for paving or flagging, lighting, cleansing, watching, regulating and improving the Town of Leamington Priors, in the County of Warwick, and for establishing a Market therein. (Repealed by Warwick District Council Act 1984 (c. xxiv))
Kentish Town Improvement Act 1843 (repealed)	6 & 7 Vict. c. lx	27 June 1843
An Act for better paving, lighting, and otherwise improving the Hamlet of Kentish Town and its Vicinity, in the Parish of Saint Pancras in the County of Middlesex. (Repealed by London Government (Borough of St. Pancras) Order in Council 1901 (SR&O 1901/274))
Plymouth and Stonehouse Roads and Transport Act 1843 (repealed)	6 & 7 Vict. c. lxi	27 June 1843
An Act for regulating Hackney Coaches and other Carriages, Boats and Wherries, within the several Parishes of Saint Andrew and Charles, in the Borough of Plymouth, the Parish of East Stonehouse, and the Parish of Stoke Damerel, in the Borough of Devonport, and for amending two several Acts for repairing certain Roads leading from the Borough of Plymouth aforesaid to Stonehouse Bridge and Plymouth Dock, all in the County of Devon. (Repealed by Plymouth, Devonport and Stonehouse Carriages and Boats Act 1877 (40 & 41 Vict. c. xcvi))
South Eastern Railway (Swan Street Station and Junction) Act 1843 or the London and Croydon Railway Act 1843	6 & 7 Vict. c. lxii	4 July 1843
An Act to enable the South-eastern Railway Company, in conjunction with the London and Croydon Railway Company, to make a Railway from the London and Croydon Railway to Swan Street, near the Bricklayers Arms in the Old Kent Road, and to provide a new Station there.
Drumpeller Railway Act 1843 or the Monkland Canal (Drumpeller Railway) Act 1843	6 & 7 Vict. c. lxiii	4 July 1843
An Act for making a Railway with other necessary Works to connect certain Coal Fields in the Parishes of Old Monkland and Bothwell in the County of Lanark with the Monkland Canal.
London and Birmingham Railway (Northampton and Peterborough Branch) Act 1843 (repealed)	6 & 7 Vict. c. lxiv	4 July 1843
An Act for making a Branch Railway from the London and Birmingham Railway to Northampton and Peterborough. (Repealed by London and Birmingham Railway and Birmingham Canal Arrangement Act 1846 (9 & 10 Vict. c. ccxliv))
Southampton Dock Company Act 1843 (repealed)	6 & 7 Vict. c. lxv	4 July 1843
An Act to convert the Shares in the Capital authorized to be raised by the Acts for making a Dock or Docks at Southampton into Stock, to raise a further Sum of Money, and to alter and amend some of the Powers of the said Acts. (Repealed by Southampton Harbour Act 1949 (12, 13 & 14 Geo. 6. c. xlv))
Fen Lands Drainage Act 1843	6 & 7 Vict. c. lxvi	4 July 1843
An Act for amending and rendering more effectual several Acts for draining and preserving certain Fen Lands and Low Grounds in the Isle of Ely and Counties of Norfolk and Suffolk, near Mildenhall River, so far as relates to the several Lands in the Second District therein described, and for extending the limits of the said Second District.
Southampton Cemetery Act 1843	6 & 7 Vict. c. lxvii	4 July 1843
An Act to establish a Cemetery for the Interment of the Dead near the Town and within the Borough of Southampton.
Topsham Improvement Act 1843	6 & 7 Vict. c. lxviii	4 July 1843
An Act for better cleansing, sewering and draining the Town of Topsham, in the County of Devon, and for other Purposes connected therewith.
Borrowstouness Town and Harbour Act 1843 (repealed)	6 & 7 Vict. c. lxix	4 July 1843
An Act to provide for the Improvement of the Town and Harbour of Borrowstounness, in the County of Linlithgow, for paving, lighting and cleansing the Streets of the said Town, and for regulating the Police thereof. (Repealed by Borrowstounness Town and Harbour Act 1875 (38 & 39 Vict. c. cxxxvii))
Maryport and Carlisle Railway Act 1843 (repealed)	6 & 7 Vict. c. lxx	12 July 1843
An Act for altering and enlarging the Powers of the Act (Note: Maryport and Carlisle Railway Act 1837 (7 Will. 4 & 1 Vict. c. ci)) relating to the Maryport and Carlisle Railway. (Repealed by Maryport and Carlisle Railway Act 1855 (18 & 19 Vict. c. lxxix))
Neath Port Act 1843	6 & 7 Vict. c. lxxi	12 July 1843
An Act for improving and maintaining the Port or Harbour of Neath in the County of Glamorgan.
Aberdeen Harbour Act 1843 (repealed)	6 & 7 Vict. c. lxxii	12 July 1843
An Act for improving and maintaining the Harbour of Aberdeen. (Repealed by Aberdeen Harbour Act 1868 (31 & 32 Vict. c. cxxxviii))
Kingston-upon-Hull Water Act 1843 (repealed)	6 & 7 Vict. c. lxxiii	12 July 1843
An Act for better supplying with Water the Borough of Kingston-upon-Hull. (Repealed by Kingston-upon-Hull Corporation Act 1897 (60 & 61 Vict. c. ccxlix))
Bolton Waterworks Act 1843 (repealed)	6 & 7 Vict. c. lxxiv	28 July 1843
An Act for more effectually supplying with Water the Town of Bolton, and several Townships adjacent thereto, in the County of Lancaster. (Repealed by Bolton Improvement Act 1854 (17 & 18 Vict. c. clix))
Liverpool Water Act 1843 (repealed)	6 & 7 Vict. c. lxxv	28 July 1843
An Act for enabling the Commissioners for paving and sewering the Town of Liverpool more effectually to water the Streets of the said Town, and to provide Water for extinguishing Fires therein. (Repealed by Liverpool Corporation Act 1921 (11 & 12 Geo. 5. c. lxxiv))
Lincolnshire Drainage Act 1843	6 & 7 Vict. c. lxxvi	28 July 1843
An Act for draining, embanking, and improving the Fen Lands and Low Grounds within the Parishes, Hamlets, Townships, or Places of Bardney, Southrow otherwise Southry, Tupholme, Buchnall, Horsington, Stixwould, Edlington, and Thimbleby, in the County of Lincoln.
Londonderry Bridge Act 1843	6 & 7 Vict. c. lxxvii	28 July 1843
An Act for amending several Acts relating to Londonderry Bridge.
Northampton Improvement Act 1843 (repealed)	6 & 7 Vict. c. lxxviii	28 July 1843
An Act for better pavine, lighting, cleansing, and improving the Town and Borough or Northampton. (Repealed by Northampton Act 1988 (c. xxix))
Monkland and Kirkintilloch Railway Act 1843	6 & 7 Vict. c. lxxix	28 July 1843
An Act to make, complete, maintain, and incorporate with the Monkland and Kirkintilloch Railway Two improved or additional Lines of Railway; and to alter, amend, enlarge, and repeal the Acts relating to the said Undertaking.
Inchbelly Bridge and Glasgow Road Act 1843 (repealed)	6 & 7 Vict. c. lxxx	28 July 1843
An Act to improve, repair, and maintain the Road from Inchbelly Bridge to Glasgow, and to make and maintain certain Branch Roads therefrom. (Repealed by Glasgow, Kirkintilloch and Baldernock Turnpike Road Trust Act 1855 (18 & 19 Vict. c. cxli))
Sutherland Roads Act 1843	6 & 7 Vict. c. lxxxi	28 July 1843
An Act for more effectually repairing, improving, and maintaining the Roads and Bridges in the County of Sutherland, and further regulating the Statute Labour in the said County; and for repairing, improving, and maintaining a certain Portion of Road in the County of Ross.
Great North of England, Clarence and Hartlepool Junction Railway Act 1843	6 & 7 Vict. c. lxxxii	28 July 1843
An Act to enable the Great North of England, Clarence, and Hartlepool Junction Railway Company to make a Branch Railway; and to explain and amend the Acts relating to the said Railway; and for other Purposes.
Dundee Harbour Act 1843	6 & 7 Vict. c. lxxxiii	28 July 1843
An Act for altering and amending the Dundee Harbour Acts, and for more effectually maintaining, improving, and extending the Harbour of Dundee; and for other Purposes connected therewith.
Tay Crossings Act 1843 (repealed)	6 & 7 Vict. c. lxxxiv	28 July 1843
An Act to extend the Term and to alter and enlarge the Powers and Provisions of the Acts for erecting, improving, regulating, and maintaining the Ferries and Passages across the River Tay in the Counties of Fife and Forfar, and for establishing a Floating Bridge or Bridges over the said River, with proper Landing Places and Approaches thereto. (Repealed by Dundee Harbour and Tay Ferries Act 1873 (36 & 37 Vict. c. l))
Paisley (Finances) Act 1843 (repealed)	6 & 7 Vict. c. lxxxv	28 July 1843
An Act for appointing Trustees for the Creditors of the Burgh of Paisley, and other Purposes relating to the financial Affairs of the said Burgh. (Repealed by Paisley Corporation (Cart Navigation) Order Confirmation Act 1938 (2 & 3 Geo. 6. c. ii))
Schoolmasters' Widows' and Children's Relief Fund (Scotland) Act 1843 (repealed)	6 & 7 Vict. c. lxxxvi	28 July 1843
An Act to render valid an Act (Note: Schoolmasters' Widows' and Children's Relief Fund (Scotland) Act 1843 (6 & 7 Vict. c. xxv)) for better raising and securing the Fund for the Relief of Widows and Children of Burgh and Parochial Schoolmasters in Scotland. (Repealed by Parish Schoolmasters' Dependents (Scotland) Act 1846 (9 & 10 Vict. c. ccxxvi))
Milne's Free School Act 1843	6 & 7 Vict. c. lxxxvii	28 July 1843
An Act to incorporate the Directors of Milne's Free School in the Town of Fochabers, and for the better Government thereof.
Burry, Loughor and Lliedi Rivers Navigation Act 1843	6 & 7 Vict. c. lxxxviii	1 August 1843
An Act to alter and amend an Act (Note: Bury, Loughor and Lliedi Rivers Navigation Act 1813 (53 Geo. 3. c. clxxxiii)) for the Improvement of the Navigation of the Rivers Burry, Loughor, and Lliedi, in the Counties of Carmarthen and Glamorgan, and to improve the Harbour of Llanelly in the said County of Carmarthen.
Edinburgh Water Company's Act 1843 (repealed)	6 & 7 Vict. c. lxxxix	1 August 1843
An Act to enable the Edinburgh Water Company to bring in an additional Supply of Water; and to alter and amend the Acts relating to the said Company. (Repealed by Edinburgh Corporation Order Confirmation Act 1958 (7 & 8 Eliz. 2. c. v))
Infant Orphan Asylum Act 1843	6 & 7 Vict. c. xc	1 August 1843
An Act to incorporate the Members of the Institution called the Infant Orphan Asylum, and to enable them the better to carry on their charitable Designs.
Castleton and Manchester Road Act 1843	6 & 7 Vict. c. xci	1 August 1843
An Act for more effectually repairing the Road from the new Wall on the Parade in Castleton in the Parish of Rochdale, through Midddleton, to the Mere Stone in Great Heaton and to the Town of Manchester, all in the County Palatine of Lancaster; and for making a Diversion in the Line of such Road.
Dingwall County Burgh Act 1843	6 & 7 Vict. c. xcii	10 August 1843
An Act for appointing the Royal Burgh of Dingwall to be the Head Burgh of the Shire of Ross, and for giving cumulative Jurisdiction to the Justices of the Peace of the Counties of Ross and Cromarty.
Gorbals Improvement Act 1843	6 & 7 Vict. c. xciii	10 August 1843
An Act for regulating the Police, and paving, cleansing, and lighting the Streets of the Town or Barony of Gorbals in the County of Lanark, and Grounds adjacent; and for other Purposes relating thereto.
Spalding, James Deeping Stone Bridge and Maxey Outgang Roads Act 1843	6 & 7 Vict. c. xciv	10 August 1843
An Act for repairing and maintaining the Roads from Spalding High Bridge, through Littleworth, to James Deeping Stone Bridge and Handley's Bridge in the County of Lincoln, and from Beeping Stone Bridge Maxey Outgang in the County of Northampton.
Road from Cromford to Belper Act 1843 (repealed)	6 & 7 Vict. c. xcv	10 August 1843
An Act for more effectually repairing the Road from the Town of Cromford to the Town of Belper, and the Road from the Main Road near the River Amber to the Turnpike Road at Bull Bridge, all in the County of Derby. (Repealed by Cromford and Belper Turnpike Road Act 1865 (28 & 29 Vict. c. cxliv))
Leicester and Peterborough Road Act 1843	6 & 7 Vict. c. xcvi	10 August 1843
An Act for more effectually repairing the Road from the Borough of Leicester to the City of Peterborough.
Argyllshire Roads, Bridges and Quays Act 1843 (repealed)	6 & 7 Vict. c. xcvii	10 August 1843
An Act for making and maintaining Highways, Roads, Bridges, and Quays, and for regulating Ferries, in the Shire of Argyll; and for altering and repairing certain Military and other Roads, Bridges, and Quays in the said Shire. (Repealed by Argyllshire Roads Act 1864 (27 & 28 Vict. c. ccvi))
Liverpool Docks Act 1843 (repealed)	6 & 7 Vict. c. xcviii	17 August 1843
An Act to alter and amend certain Provisions of the Acts relating to the Docks and Harbour of Liverpool. (Repealed by Mersey Dock Acts Consolidation Act 1858 (21 & 22 Vict. c. xcii))
Police in Glasgow Act 1843 (repealed)	6 & 7 Vict. c. xcix	17 August 1843
An Act to consolidate, amend, and extend the Provisions of several Acts, for the better paving, watching, lighting, and cleansing, and for regulating the Police of the City of Glasgow and adjoining Districts, and also for managing the Statute Labour of the said City; and for other Purposes in relation thereto. (Repealed by Glasgow Police Act 1862 (25 & 26 Vict. c. cciv))
Donegal and Londonderry Drainage Act 1843	6 & 7 Vict. c. c	17 August 1843
An Act for amending an Act passed in the Second Year of the Reign of Her present Majesty, (Note: Donegal and Londonderry Drainage Act 1838 (1 & 2 Vict. c. lxxxvii)) for draining and embanking certain Lands in Lough Swilly and Lough Foyle in the Counties of Donegal and Londonderry, so far as the same relates to the said Lands in Lough Foyle.
Port of London Coalwhippers Act 1843 (repealed)	6 & 7 Vict. c. ci	22 August 1843
An Act for establishing an Office for the Benefit of Coalwhippers of the Port of London; and for staying certain Actions in respect of Fitters Certificates. (Repealed by Statute Law (Repeals) Act 2008 (c. 12))
Dublin Rates Act 1843	6 & 7 Vict. c. cii	22 August 1843
An Act for the more equal Applotment of certain Rates in the County of the City of Dublin and County of Dublin respectively.
Belfast and Cavehill Railway Act 1843	6 & 7 Vict. c. ciii	22 August 1843
An Act for maintaining the Railway called "The Belfast and Cavehill Railway," and for reviving and extending some of the Powers of the Acts relating thereto.
Lagan Navigation Act 1843	6 & 7 Vict. c. civ	22 August 1843
An Act to incorporate the Persons having Claims upon the Lagan Navigation in Ireland, and to provide for the future Management and Improvement of the said Navigation.
Anderston Improvement Act 1843	6 & 7 Vict. c. cv	22 August 1843
An Act for the Improvement of the Burgh of Anderston in the County of Lanark; for regulating the Police thereof, and of certain Lands adjacent; and for other Purposes relating thereto.
North Esk Reservoir Act 1843	6 & 7 Vict. c. cvi	22 August 1843
An Act for making and maintaining a Reservoir at Deerhope or Fairliehope on the River North Esk in the Counties of Edinburgh and Peebles; and for other Purposes relating thereto.
Glasgow Marine Insurance Company Act 1843 (repealed)	6 & 7 Vict. c. cvii	22 August 1843
An Act to enable the Glasgow Marine Insurance Company to sue and be sued; and for other Purposes relating to the said Company. (Repealed by Statute Law (Repeals) Act 1998 (c. 43))
Surrey and Kent Roads Act 1843	6 & 7 Vict. c. cviii	22 August 1843
An Act for more effectually repairing certain Roads in the Parishes of Bermondsey, Rotherhithe, and Saint Paul and Saint Nicholas Deptford, and for making several new Roads connected therewith, all in the Counties of Surrey and Kent.
Liverpool Fire Protection Act 1843 (repealed)	6 & 7 Vict. c. cix	24 August 1843
An Act for the better Protection of Property in the Borough of Liverpool from Fire. (Repealed by Merseyside Act 1980 (c. x))
British Iron Company Act 1843	6 & 7 Vict. c. cx	24 August 1843
An Act to enlarge the Powers granted by an Act of the Fourth Year of Her present Majesty, intituled "An Act for granting certain Powers to the British Iron Company," (Note: British Iron Company Act 1840 (3 & 4 Vict. c. xcvi)) and to facilitate the Sale of the Estates and Properties belonging to the said Company.

=== Private acts ===
Short title	Citation	Royal assent
Long title
Littleton Inclosure Act 1843	6 & 7 Vict. c. 1 Pr.	3 April 1843
An Act for inclosing Lands in the Parish of Littleton in the County of Southampton.
Earl of Leicester's Estate Act 1843	6 & 7 Vict. c. 2 Pr.	11 April 1843
An Act for confirming a Settlement and Jointure Provision made by the Right Honourable Thomas William Earl of Leicester, of Holkham in the County of Norfolk, during his Minority, out of certain entailed Estates in the County of Norfolk, in favour of Juliana Whitbread Spinster, in contemplation of their Marriage.
Grafton Inclosure Act 1843	6 & 7 Vict. c. 3 Pr.	11 April 1843
An Act for inclosing Lands within the Manor and Hamlet of Grafton, situate in that Part of the Parish of Longford which lies in the County of Oxford.
Great Gransden Inclosure Act 1843	6 & 7 Vict. c. 4 Pr.	9 May 1843
An Act for inclosing Lands in the Parish of Great Gransden in the County of Huntingdon.
Charlwood Inclosure Act 1843	6 & 7 Vict. c. 5 Pr.	9 May 1843
An Act for inclosing Lands in the Manor and Parish of Charhoood in the County of Surrey.
Cliffe-cum-Lund Inclosure Act 1843	6 & 7 Vict. c. 6 Pr.	31 May 1843
An Act for inclosing Lands in the Township of Cliffe-cum-Lund in the Parish of Hemingbrough in the East Riding of the County of York.
Chalgrove Inclosure Act 1843	6 & 7 Vict. c. 7 Pr.	27 June 1843
An Act for inclosing Lands in the Parish of Chalgrove in the County of Oxford.
Haddenham Inclosure Act 1843	6 & 7 Vict. c. 8 Pr.	27 June 1843
An Act for inclosing Lands in the Parish of Haddenham in the Isle of Ely in the County of Cambridge.
Great Bromley Inclosure Act 1843	6 & 7 Vict. c. 9 Pr.	27 June 1843
An Act for inclosing Lands in the Parish of Great Bromley in the County of Essex.
Sowerby and Soyland Inclosure Act 1843	6 & 7 Vict. c. 10 Pr.	27 June 1843
An Act for inclosing Lands in Sowerby and Soyland in the Parish of Halifax in the West Riding of the County of York.
Balfour's Estate Act 1843	6 & 7 Vict. c. 11 Pr.	27 June 1843
An Act for vesting the entailed Estates of Wester Fairnie and others in the County of Fife, belonging to Francis Balfour Esquire, in Trustees, to sell the same, or such Part thereof as may be necessary, and to apply the Price arising therefrom in the Payment of the Debts affecting or that may be made to affect the said Estates.
Hawkins' Estate Act 1843	6 & 7 Vict. c. 12 Pr.	27 June 1843
An Act for authorizing Surrenders of certain Leases for Lives of Manors and Hereditaments in the County of Cornwall (late the Estate and Property of Sir Christopher Hawkins Baronet, deceased,) by the Tenants for Life in Possession under his Will, and other Persons, and the Acceptance of renewed Leases, with certain Exceptions and Reservations.
Leighton Buzzard Inclosure Act 1843	6 & 7 Vict. c. 13 Pr.	4 July 1843
An Act for inclosing Lands in the Parish of Leighton Bussard in the County of Bedford.
Eglwysrhos, Llandudno, Llangwstenin and Llandrillo Inclosure Act 1843	6 & 7 Vict. c. 14 Pr.	12 July 1843
An Act for inclosing Lands in the several Parishes of Eglwys-rhos, Llandudno, and Llangwstenin in the County of Carnarvon, and in the Parish of Llandrillo in the Counties of Denbigh and Carnarvom or either of them.
Lord Gray's Estate Act 1843	6 & 7 Vict. c. 15 Pr.	12 July 1843
An Act to enable John Lord Gray to borrow a certain Sum of Money upon the Security of his entailed Estates of Gray and Kinfauns; and to extinguish certain Claims for Money laid out in Improvements affecting the said Estates.
Walton-on-the-Hill Rectory Act 1843	6 & 7 Vict. c. 16 Pr.	28 July 1843
An Act for the Division of the Rectory of Walton-on-the-Hill in the County Palatine of Lancaster, and for authorizing Sales and Conveyances in Fee, or Leases for long Terms of Years, for Building Purposes, and other Dispositions, to be made of the Lands and Revenues belonging to the said Rectory and to the Vicarage of Walton-on-the-Hill, for the Endowment of such separate Rectories and the Augmentation of such Vicarage.
Marquess of Abercorn's Estate Act 1843	6 & 7 Vict. c. 17 Pr.	28 July 1843
An Act to enable the Most Noble James Marquess of Abercorn to uplift certain Sums of Money lying in Bank, and to borrow upon the Security of the entailed Estates of Paisley and Duddingstone such further Sum as may be necessary, for Repayment to him of a Portion of the Monies laid out on the Improvement of the said Estates; and to enlarge the Power of feuing the same.
Dowager Countess of Waldegrave's Estate Act 1843	6 & 7 Vict. c. 18 Pr.	28 July 1843
An Act for authorizing the Disposition, by way of Partition, Leasee or Sale, of certain undivided Parts or Shares belonging in Possession and in Expectancy to the Ladies Horatia Elizabeth and Ida Anna Waldegrave, Infants, of and in the Manors of Whittlesey otherwise Whittlesea Saint Mary and Saint Andrew, and the Rectories of Whittlesey otherwise Whittlesea Saint Mary and Saint Andrew, and certain Rent-charges created in Commutation of Tithes, Messuages, Lands, and other Hereditaments in the Isle of Ely in the County of Cambridge.
Earl of Gaisborough's Estate Act 1843	6 & 7 Vict. c. 19 Pr.	1 August 1843
An Act for vesting in Charles Noel Welman Esquire and his Heirs certain Estates in the Parishes of Trull, Pitminster, Wilton and Taunton Saint Mary Magdalen, in the County of Somerset, holden under the Marriage Settlements of Charles Noel Earl of Gainsborough and Elizabeth his first Wife, deceased, discharged from the Uses of the same Settlements and of all subsequent Assurances, and for substituting and settling certain Estates in the Parish of Weston Zoyland in the same County in lien thereof and to the like Uses.
M'Culluh's (or Roupell's) Estate Act 1843	6 & 7 Vict. c. 20 Pr.	1 August 1843
An Act to authorize the granting of Building and Repairing Leases of Lands in the County of Kent formerly belonging to Francis M'Culluh, George Boons Roupell, and James Browne Homer in undivided Shares.
Wilkinson's Estate Act 1843	6 & 7 Vict. c. 21 Pr.	1 August 1843
An Act for enlarging the Power to grant Building Leases contained in the Will of John Wilkinson Esquire, Doctor of Physic, deceased; and for other Purposes.
Oxnam's Estate Act 1843	6 & 7 Vict. c. 22 Pr.	1 August 1843
An Act for authorizing Leases and Setts to be granted of and in an Estate in the Parish of Newlyn in the County of Cornwall, devised by the Will of John Oxnam deceased to John Oxnam for his Life, with divers Remainders over.
Berwick-upon-Tweed Corporation Act 1843	6 & 7 Vict. c. 23 Pr.	1 August 1843
An Act for settling and establishing the Rights of the resident Freemen and resident Widows of Freemen of the Borough of Berwick-upon-Tweed in the Property vested in the Mayor, Aldermen, and Burgesses of that Borough; and for other Purposes.
Saggart Commons Award Act 1843	6 & 7 Vict. c. 24 Pr.	10 August 1843
An Act for rendering valid a certain Award as to the Commons of Saggart within the Parish of Saggart in the County of Dublin.
Fox's Estate Act 1843	6 & 7 Vict. c. 25 Pr.	10 August 1843
An Act for authorizing the Sale of Portion of the Real Estate devised by the Will of Richard Fox of Foxhall in the County of Longford, Esquire, deceased, and vesting the Residue thereof in Richard Maxwell Fox of Foxhall aforesaid, Esquire, his Heirs and Assigns, in Fee Simple, and for vesting certain Lands and Hereditaments of the said Richard Maxwell Fox in the Right Honourable Henry Lord Baron Farnham, in lieu thereof, to the Uses and upon the Trusts of the said Will.
Duchall Estate Act 1843	6 & 7 Vict. c. 26 Pr.	10 August 1843
An Act to vest certain Parts of the entailed Estate of Duchall in the County of Renfrew in Trustees, to sell the same, and apply the Price thereof in discharging the Debts and Provisions affecting the said entailed Estate, and, if necessary, in purchasing the Teinds thereof.
Gibson's Estate Act 1843	6 & 7 Vict. c. 27 Pr.	22 August 1843
An Act to confirm Two existing Leases, and to enable the Reverend James White, and the Persons for the Time being entitled to certain Estates situate in the Parish of Bonchurch in the Isle of Wight, in the County of Southampton, devised by the Will of Charles Fitzmaurice Hill Esquire, deceased, to accept Surrenders of existing Leases, and to grant new Leases in lieu thereof.
Shrewsbury Estate Act 1843	6 & 7 Vict. c. 28 Pr.	22 August 1843
An Act for vesting Part of the settled Estates of the Right Honourable John Earl of Shrewsbury, in the Counties of Oxford, Chester, Salop, Worcester, and Stafford, in Trustees, to be sold, and for laying out the Monies to arise by such Sale in the Purchase of other Lands and Hereditaments, to be settled in lieu thereof to the same Uses and subject to the same Restrictions; and for other Purposes therein mentioned.
Miller's Estate Act 1843	6 & 7 Vict. c. 29 Pr.	24 August 1843
An Act for enabling certain Persons, on behalf of John Weston (a Person of unsound Mind) and Sarah his Wife and of John Jones (also a Person of unsound Mind), to join in carrying into effect a Compromise and Arrangement with other Parties for a Division of the Real Estates of Arthur Gramer Miller deceased, according to a Rule of Her Majesty's Court of Exchequer of Pleas.
Samwell's Name Act 1843 (Note: This act was not printed by the Queen's Printer.)	6 & 7 Vict. c. 30 Pr.	3 April 1843
An Act to enable Thomas Fuller Drought Esquire and his Issue Male to take the Surname and use the Arms of Samwell, pursuant to the Will of Sir Thomas Samwell Baronet, deceased.
Lady Fleetwood's Naturalization Act 1843	6 & 7 Vict. c. 31 Pr.	3 April 1843
An Act for naturalizing Dame Virginie Marie Hesketh Fleetwood, the Wife of Sir Peter Hesketh Fleetwood Baronet.
Caswell's Disability Removal Act 1843	6 & 7 Vict. c. 32 Pr.	31 May 1843
An Act to enable Henry Caswall, Clerk, to exercise his Office of a Priest, and to hold any Benefice or Preferment in the United Church of England and Ireland.
Kendall's Divorce Act 1843	6 & 7 Vict. c. 33 Pr.	27 June 1843
An Act to dissolve the Marriage of Nicholas Kendall, Esquire, with Mary Anne, his now Wife, and to enable him to marry again, and for other Purposes therein mentioned.
Watson's Divorce Act 1843	6 & 7 Vict. c. 34 Pr.	27 June 1843
An Act to dissolve the Marriage of William Watson, Esquire, with the Honourable Catharine Georgians, his now Wife, and to enable him to marry again, and for other Purposes therein mentioned.
Townshend Peerage Act 1843	6 & 7 Vict. c. 35 Pr.	12 July 1843
An Act to declare that certain Persons therein mentioned are not Children of the Most Honourable George Ferrars Marquis Townshend.
Todhunter's Divorce Act 1843	6 & 7 Vict. c. 36 Pr.	12 July 1843
An Act to dissolve the Marriage of John Todhunter with Rosa Matilda his now Wife, and to enable him to marry again; and for other Purposes therein mentioned.
Jackson's Divorce Act 1843	6 & 7 Vict. c. 37 Pr.	28 July 1843
An Act to dissolve the Marriage of William Oliver Jackson Esquire with Georgiana Maria Jane Jackson his now Wife, and to enable him to marry again; and for other Purposes.
Hambro's Naturalization Act 1843	6 & 7 Vict. c. 38 Pr.	10 August 1843
An Act for naturalizing Carl Joachim Hambro.
Morgan's Divorce Act 1843	6 & 7 Vict. c. 39 Pr.	22 August 1843
An Act to dissolve the Marriage of Herbert Morgan Esquire, a Lieutenant in Her Majesty's First or Royal Regiment of Dragoons, with Elizabeth Morgan his now Wife, and to enable him to marry again; and for other Purposes therein mentioned.

=== Sources ===
- The Statutes of the United Kingdom of Great Britain and Ireland, 6 & 7 Victoria. London. 1843 – via Internet Archive.
- A Collection of the Public General Statutes passed in the Sixth and Seventh Year of the Reign of Her Majesty Queen Victoria, 1843. London: Eyre & Spottiswoode. 1843 – via Internet Archive.
- "6° & 7° Victoriæ". The Statutes of the United Kingdom of Great Britain and Ireland. Vol. 16: 5 & 6 Victoria (1842) and 6 & 7 Victoria (1843). London: Eyre & Spottiswoode. 1843. pp. 591–962 – via Google Books.
- Journals of the House of Commons (PDF). Vol. 98 – via parliament.uk.

== See also ==
- List of acts of the Parliament of the United Kingdom
