= Merchant Seamen Act 1835 =

Act of the Parliament of the United Kingdom

- Act of Parliament
- Parliament of the United Kingdom
- Long title: An Act to amend and consolidate the Laws relating to the Merchant Seamen of the United Kingdom, and for forming and maintaining a Register of all the Men engaged in that Service.
- Citation: 5 & 6 Will. 4. c. 19
- Territorial extent: United Kingdom

Dates
- Royal assent: 30 July 1835
- Commencement: 31 July 1835 (Note: Section 1.)
- Repealed: 1 May 1855
Other legislation
Amends	See § Repealed enactments
Repeals/revokes	See § Repealed enactments
Amended by	Merchant Seamen Act 1844
Repealed by	Merchant Shipping Repeal Act 1854
Relates to	Merchant Seamen Act 1844; Merchant Shipping Repeal Act 1854; Merchant Shipping Act 1894

Status: Repealed

Text of statute as originally enacted

The Merchant Seamen Act 1835 (5 & 6 Will. 4. c. 19) was an act of the Parliament of the United Kingdom that amended and consolidated various enactments relating to merchant shipping in the United Kingdom.

== Provisions ==
=== Repealed enactments ===
Section 1 of the act repealed 9 enactments, listed in that section.

Citation	Short title	Title	Extent of repeal
2 & 3 Ann. c. 6	Navigation Act 1703	An Act passed in the Second Year of the Reign of Her late Majesty Queen Anne, for the Increase of Seamen, and better Encouragement of Navigation, and Security of the Coal Trade.	The whole act.
2 Geo. 2.c. 36	Merchant Seamen Act 1728	An Act passed in the Second Year of the Reign of His late Majesty King George the Second, for the better Regulation and Government of the Seamen in the Merchant Servi	The whole act.
2 Geo. 3.c. 31	Merchant Seamen Act 1762	An Act passed in the Second Year of the Reign of His late Majesty King George the Third, for making perpetual the last-mentioned Act, and for extending the Provisions thereof to His Majesty's Colonies in America.	The whole act.
31 Geo. 3. c. 39	Merchant Shipping Act 1791	An Act passed in the Thirty-first Year of the Reign of His said Majesty King George the Third, for the better Regulation and Government of Seamen employed in the Coasting Trade of this Kingdom.	The whole act.
45 Geo. 3. c. 81	Coasting Trade Act 1805	An Act passed in the Forty- fifth Year of the Reign of His said late Majesty, for amending the last-mentioned Act.	The whole act.
37 Geo. 3. c. 73	Desertion of Seamen Act 1797	An Act passed in the Thirty-seventh Year of the Reign of His said Majesty King George the Third, for preventing the Desertion of Seamen from British Merchant Ships trading to His Majesty's Colonies and Plantations in the West Indies.	The whole act.
58 Geo. 3. c. 38	Relief of Sailors Abroad Act 1818	An Act passed in the Fifty-eighth Year of the Reign of His said late Majesty King George the Third, to extend and render more effectual the Regulations for the Relief of Seafaring Men and Boys, Subjects of the United Kingdom, in Foreign Parts	The whole act.
4 Geo. 4. c. 25	Merchant Seamen, etc. Act 1823	An Act passed in the Fourth Year of the Reign of His late Majesty King George the Fourth, for regulating the Number of Apprentices to be taken on board British Merchant Vessels, and for preventing the Desertion of Seamen therefrom.	The whole act.
3 & 4 Will. 4. c. 88	Merchant Seamen Act 1833	An Act passed in the Fourth Year of His present Majesty's Reign, for continuing an Act of the Fifty-ninth Year of and King George the Third, for facilitating the Recovery of the Wages of Seamen in the Merchants Service. (Note: Wages of Merchant Seamen Act 1819 (59 Geo. 3. 58))	The whole act.

== Subsequent developments ==
The Merchant Seamen Act 1844 (7 & 8 Vict. c. 112) further consolidated enactments relating to merchant shipping in the United Kingdom. Section 1 of the act repealed the whole act "except so far as relates to the Establishment, Maintenance and Regulations of the Office called "The General Register of Merchant Seamen"", which came into force on 5 September 1844.

The whole act was repealed by section 4 of, and the schedule to, the Merchant Shipping Repeal Act 1854 (17 & 18 Vict. c. 120), which came into force on 1 May 1855.
