= List of acts of the Parliament of Great Britain from 1728 =

This is a complete list of acts of the Parliament of Great Britain for the year 1728.

For acts passed until 1707, see the list of acts of the Parliament of England and the list of acts of the Parliament of Scotland. See also the list of acts of the Parliament of Ireland.

For acts passed from 1801 onwards, see the list of acts of the Parliament of the United Kingdom. For acts of the devolved parliaments and assemblies in the United Kingdom, see the list of acts of the Scottish Parliament, the list of acts of the Northern Ireland Assembly, and the list of acts and measures of Senedd Cymru; see also the list of acts of the Parliament of Northern Ireland.

The number shown after each act's title is its chapter number. Acts are cited using this number, preceded by the year(s) of the reign during which the relevant parliamentary session was held; thus the Union with Ireland Act 1800 is cited as "39 & 40 Geo. 3. c. 67", meaning the 67th act passed during the session that started in the 39th year of the reign of George III and which finished in the 40th year of that reign. Note that the modern convention is to use Arabic numerals in citations (thus "41 Geo. 3" rather than "41 Geo. III"). Acts of the last session of the Parliament of Great Britain and the first session of the Parliament of the United Kingdom are both cited as "41 Geo. 3".

Acts passed by the Parliament of Great Britain did not have a short title; however, some of these acts have subsequently been given a short title by acts of the Parliament of the United Kingdom (such as the Short Titles Act 1896).

Before the Acts of Parliament (Commencement) Act 1793 came into force on 8 April 1793, acts passed by the Parliament of Great Britain were deemed to have come into effect on the first day of the session in which they were passed. Because of this, the years given in the list below may in fact be the year before a particular act was passed.

== 2 Geo. 2 ==
The second session of the 7th Parliament of Great Britain, which met from 21 January 1729 until 14 May 1729.

This session was also traditionally cited as 2 G. 2.

=== Public acts ===
Short title	Citation	Royal assent
Long title
Taxation Act 1728 (repealed)	2 Geo. 2. c. 1	18 February 1729
An Act for continuing the Duties upon Malt, Mum, Cyder, and Perry, in that Part of Great Britain called England, and for granting to His Majesty certain Duties upon Malt, Mum, Cyder, and Perry, in that Part of Great Britain called Scotland, for the Service of the Year One Thousand Seven Hundred and Twenty-nine; and for making good the Deficiency of a late Malt Act. (Repealed by Statute Law Revision Act 1867 (30 & 31 Vict. c. 59))
Mutiny Act 1728 (repealed)	2 Geo. 2. c. 2	24 March 1729
An Act for punishing Mutiny and Desertion; and for the better Payment of the Army and their Quarters. (Repealed by Statute Law Revision Act 1867 (30 & 31 Vict. c. 59))
Bank of England Act 1728 (repealed)	2 Geo. 2. c. 3	24 March 1729
An Act for raising the Sum of One Million Two Hundred and Fifty Thousand Pounds, by Sale of Annuities to the Bank of England, after the Rate of Four Pounds per Centum per Annum, redeemable by Parliament; and for applying the Produce of the Sinking Fund. (Repealed by Statute Law Revision Act 1966 (c. 5))
Land Tax Act 1728 (repealed)	2 Geo. 2. c. 4	24 March 1729
An Act for granting an Aid to His Majesty, by a Land Tax, to be raised in Great Britain, for the Service of the Year One Thousand Seven Hundred and Twenty-nine. (Repealed by Statute Law Revision Act 1867 (30 & 31 Vict. c. 59))
Lichfield Roads Act 1728 (repealed)	2 Geo. 2. c. 5	24 March 1729
An Act for repairing the Roads leading from Cannals Gate to the City of Lichfield, and from the said City to Stone, and from thence to the End of the County of Stafford, in the Post Road towards Chester; and also from the Town of Burton upon Trent to the said City of Lichfield, and from thence to Wood End and Ogley Hay; and also from the said City of Lichfield to High Bridges, in the County of Stafford, and the County of the said City of Lichfield. (Repealed by Stafford and Warwick Roads Act 1789 (29 Geo. 3. c. 83))
Exchequer Act 1728 (repealed)	2 Geo. 2. c. 6	24 March 1729
An Act for making good the Loss occasioned by a Sum of Money being stolen out of His Majesty's Exchequer, in the Year One Thousand Seven Hundred and Twenty-four. (Repealed by Statute Law Revision Act 1867 (30 & 31 Vict. c. 59))
Greenwich Hospital Act 1728 (repealed)	2 Geo. 2. c. 7	14 May 1729
An Act for the more effectual collecting, in Great Britain and Ireland, and other Parts of His Majesty's Dominions, the Duties granted for the Support of the Royal Hospital at Greenwich. (Repealed by Greenwich Hospital Act 1834 (4 & 5 Will. 4. c. 34))
South Sea Company Act 1728 (repealed)	2 Geo. 2. c. 8	14 May 1729
An Act to discharge the Trustees appointed by an Act of the Seventh Year of His late Majesty's Reign, (Note: South Sea Company (No. 3) Act 1720 (7 Geo. 1. St. 1. c. 28)) for raising Money upon the Estates of the late Directors of the South Sea Company and others, of their Trust; and to vest in the Company such of the Estates which were vested in the said Trustees as remain undisposed of; as also the Produce of such Estates and Effects as have been disposed of by the Trustees. (Repealed by Statute Law Revision Act 1867 (30 & 31 Vict. c. 59))
Importation Act 1728 (repealed)	2 Geo. 2. c. 9	14 May 1729
An Act to repeal a Clause in an Act made in the Ninth Year of His late Majesty's Reign, (Note: Customs Act 1722 (9 Geo. 1. c. 21)) which prohibits the Importation of Tobacco stript from the Stalk or Stem. (Repealed by Statute Law Revision Act 1867 (30 & 31 Vict. c. 59))
Spittlefields, Stepney (Parish) Act 1727 (repealed)	2 Geo. 2. c. 10	14 May 1729
An Act for making the Hamlet of Spittle-fields, in the Parish of Saint Dunstan Stebunheath, alias Stepney, in the County of Middlesex, a distinct Parish; and for providing a Maintenance for the Minister of such new Parish. (Note: Spittlefields is an alternative spelling of Spitalfields.) (Repealed by London Government (Borough of Stepney) Order in Council 1901 (SR&O 1901/276))
Westminster Streets Act 1728 (repealed)	2 Geo. 2. c. 11	14 May 1729
An Act for better paving and cleansing the Streets in the City and Liberty of Westminster, and other Places within the Limits of the Weekly Bills of Mortality, in the County of Middlesex. (Repealed by Statute Law Revision Act 1948 (11 & 12 Geo. 6. c. 62))
Wiltshire Highway Act 1728 (repealed)	2 Geo. 2. c. 12	14 May 1729
An Act for the more effectual repairing the Highways between Sheppard's Shord and Horsley Upright Gate, leading down Bagdown Hill, in the County of Wilts, and other ruinous Parts of the Highways thereunto adjacent. (Repealed by Wiltshire Roads (No. 2) Act 1790 (30 Geo. 3. c. 98))
Leominster Roads Act 1728 (repealed)	2 Geo. 2. c. 13	14 May 1729
An Act for repairing the several Roads therein mentioned, leading into the Town of Leominster, in the County of Hereford. (Repealed by Leominster Roads Act 1800 (39 & 40 Geo. 3. c. lxv))
Shoreditch and Enfield Roads Act 1728 (repealed)	2 Geo. 2. c. 14	14 May 1729
An Act for making more effectual the Acts passed for repairing the Road, from The Stone's-end in Shoreditch, in the County of Middlesex, to the furthermost Part of the Northern Road in the Parish of Endfield, in the same County, next to the Parish of Cheshunt, in the County of Hertford; and for amending the Road from the Watch-house in Edmonton to the Market Place in Endfield. (Repealed by Middlesex Roads Act 1789 (29 Geo. 3. c. 96))
Brickmaking Act 1728 (repealed)	2 Geo. 2. c. 15	14 May 1729
An Act to explain and amend an Act, made in the Twelfth Year of His late Majesty's Reign, intituled, "An Act to prevent Abuses in the making of Bricks and Tiles, and to ascertain the Dimensions thereof; and to prevent all unlawful Combinations amongst any Brick-makers or Tile-makers within Fifteen Miles of the City of London, in order to advance or enhance the Price of Bricks or Tiles." (Note: Brick Making Act 1725 (12 Geo. 1. c. 35)) (Repealed by Statute Law Revision Act 1867 (30 & 31 Vict. c. 59))
Trinity Chapel, Leeds Act 1728	2 Geo. 2. c. 16	14 May 1729
An Act to make the Chapel of Ease of The Holy and Undivided Trinity, in the Town of Leeds, in the County of York, a perpetual Cure and Benefice; and for defraying of some Expences in finishing the said Chapel yet remaining unpaid.
Taxation (No. 2) Act 1728 (repealed)	2 Geo. 2. c. 17	14 May 1729
An Act for laying a Duty upon Compound Waters, or Spirits; and for licensing the Retailers thereof. (Repealed by Spirit Duties Act 1732 (6 Geo. 2. c. 17))
Customs, etc. Act 1728 (repealed)	2 Geo. 2. c. 18	14 May 1729
An Act to ascertain the Custom payable for Corn and Grain imported; for better ascertaining the Price and Quantity of Corn and Grain for which a Bounty is payable upon Exportation; for appropriating the Supplies granted in this Session of Parliament; and for giving further Time to Clerks and Apprentices to pay Duties omitted to be paid for their Indentures and Contracts. (Repealed by Statute Law Revision Act 1867 (30 & 31 Vict. c. 59))
Medway Oyster Fishery Act 1728	2 Geo. 2. c. 19	14 May 1729
An Act for regulating, well-ordering, governing, and improving, the Oyster Fishery in the River Medway and Waters thereof, under the Authority of the Mayor and Citizens of the City of Rochester, in the County of Kent.
Insolvent Debtors Relief Act 1728 (repealed)	2 Geo. 2. c. 20	14 May 1729
An Act for the Relief of Insolvent Debtors. (Repealed by Statute Law Revision Act 1867 (30 & 31 Vict. c. 59))
Murder Act 1728 (repealed)	2 Geo. 2. c. 21	14 May 1729
An Act for the Trial of Murders, in Cases where the Stroke or Death only happens within that Part of Great Britain called England. (Repealed by Offences Against the Person Act 1828 (9 Geo. 4. c. 31) and for India by Criminal Law (India) Act 1828 (9 Geo. 4. c. 74))
Insolvent Debtors Relief (No. 2) Act 1728 (repealed)	2 Geo. 2. c. 22	14 May 1729
An Act for the Relief of Debtors, with respect to the Imprisonment of their Persons. (Repealed by Statute Law Revision and Civil Procedure Act 1883 (46 & 47 Vict. c. 49))
Attorneys and Solicitors Act 1728 (repealed)	2 Geo. 2. c. 23	14 May 1729
An Act for the better Regulation of Attornies and Solicitors. (Repealed by Solicitors Act 1843 (6 & 7 Vict. c. 73))
Corrupt Practices at Parliamentary Elections Act 1728 (repealed)	2 Geo. 2. c. 24	14 May 1729
An Act for the more effectual preventing Bribery and Corruption in the Elections of Members to serve in Parliament. (Repealed by Controverted Elections Act 1788 (28 Geo. 3. c. 52), Corrupt Practices Prevention Act 1854 (17 & 18 Vict. c. 102) and Ballot Act 1872 (35 & 36 Vict. c. 33))
Perjury Act 1728 (repealed)	2 Geo. 2. c. 25	14 May 1729
An Act for the more effectual preventing and further Punishment of Forgery, Perjury, and Subornation of Perjury; and to make it Felony to steal Bonds, Notes, or other Securities for Payment of Money. (Repealed by Perjury Act 1911 (1 & 2 Geo. 5. c. 6))
Thames Watermen Act 1728 (repealed)	2 Geo. 2. c. 26	14 May 1729
An Act for making more effectual several Acts passed, relating to Watermen, Wherrymen, and Lightermen, rowing on the River Thames; (Note: Thames Watermen Act 1698 (11 Will. 3. c. 21)) and for better ordering and governing such Watermen, Wherrymen, and Lightermen. (Repealed by Thames Watermen and Lightermen Act 1827 (7 & 8 Geo. 4. c. lxxv))
Regency During the King's Absence Act 1728 (repealed)	2 Geo. 2. c. 27	14 May 1729
An Act to enable Her Majesty to be Regent of this Kingdom, during His Majesty's Absence, without taking the Oaths. (Repealed by Statute Law Revision Act 1867 (30 & 31 Vict. c. 59))
Unlawful Games Act 1728 (repealed)	2 Geo. 2. c. 28	14 May 1729
An Act to revive the Laws therein mentioned, relating to the Importation of Foreign Brandy, and other Waters and Spirits; (Note: Adulteration of Coffee Act 1718 (5 Geo. 1. c. 11)) for Importation of Cochineal; (Note: Importation (No. 2) Act 1726 (13 Geo. 1. c. 25)) to continue several Acts for preventing Frauds in the Customs; for Encouragement of the Silk Manufactures of this Kingdom; (Note: Silk Subsidies, Various Duties, Import of Furs, etc. Act 1721 (8 Geo. 1. c. 15)) for making Copper Ore of the British Plantations an enumerated Commodity; (Note: Customs, etc. Act 1721 (8 Geo. 1. c. 18)) for making perpetual an Act therein mentioned, for suppressing of Piracy; (Note: Piracy Act 1721 (8 Geo. 1. c. 24)) for enabling Persons prosecuted upon the Capias, in relation to the Running of Goods, to defend in Forma Pauperis; for more effectual debarring of unlawful Games; (Note: Unlawful Games Act 1541 (33 Hen. 8. c. 9)) for licensing Retailers of Brandy and other distilled Liquors; and for better Regulation of Licenses for Common Inns and Alehouses. (Repealed by Betting and Gaming Act 1960 (8 & 9 Eliz. 2. c. 60))
Collegiate Church of Manchester Act 1728 (repealed)	2 Geo. 2. c. 29	14 May 1729
An Act to empower His Majesty to visit the Collegiate Church of Manchester, during such Time as the Wardenship of the said Church is, or shall be, held in Commendam with the Bishopric of Chester. (Repealed by Statute Law Revision Act 1867 (30 & 31 Vict. c. 59))
Wapping Stepney Act 1728 (repealed)	2 Geo. 2. c. 30	14 May 1729
An Act for making the Hamlet of Wapping Stepney, in the Parish of St. Dunstan Stebunheath, alias Stepney, in the County of Middlesex, a distinct Parish; and for providing a Maintenance for the Minister of the new Church there. (Repealed by London Government (Borough of Stepney) Order in Council 1901 (SR&O 1901/276))
Indemnity Act 1728 (repealed)	2 Geo. 2. c. 31	14 May 1729
An Act for indemnifying Persons who have omitted to qualify themselves for Offices or Employments within the Time limited by Law, and for allowing further Time for that Purpose; and for repealing so much of an Act of Parliament, passed in the First Year of His late Majesty King George the First, (Note: Oaths, etc. Act 1714 (1 Geo. 1. St. 1. c. 3)) as requires Persons to qualify themselves for Offices or Employments within Three Months; and for limiting other Times for such Qualifications; as also for the Repeal of so much of an Act, (Note: Parliament Act 1678 (30 Cha. 2. St. 2)) passed 30° Coroli II, as relates to the sworn Servants of the King or Queen's Majesty. (Repealed by Statute Law Revision Act 1867 (30 & 31 Vict. c. 59))
Warden of Fleet Prison Act 1728 (repealed)	2 Geo. 2. c. 32	14 May 1729
An Act to empower His Majesty, His Heirs and Successors, during the Life of Thomas Bambridge Esquire, (Note: Thomas Bambridge) to grant the Office of Warden of the Prison of The Fleet to such Person or Persons as His Majesty shall think fit; and to incapacitate the said Thomas Bambridge to enjoy the said Office, or any other whatsoever. (Repealed by Statute Law Revision Act 1867 (30 & 31 Vict. c. 59))
Crown Lands (Forfeited Estates) Act 1728 (repealed)	2 Geo. 2. c. 33	14 May 1729
An Act for obviating any Doubts or Difficulties that may arise from an Act, passed in the First Year of His present Majesty, (Note: Crown Lands (Forfeited Estates) Act 1727 (1 Geo. 2. St. 2. c. 21)) intituled, "An Act to explain and amend an Act passed in the Thirteenth Year of His late Majesty's Reign, intituled, 'An Act for Sale of such of the forfeited Estates, in that Part of Great Britain called Scotland, as remain unsold, and are vested in the Crown; and for determining such Claims on the said Estates as, having been duly entered, remain undetermined.'" (Repealed by Statute Law Revision Act 1948 (11 & 12 Geo. 6. c. 62))
Province of Carolina Act 1728 (repealed)	2 Geo. 2. c. 34	14 May 1729
An Act for establishing an Agreement with Seven of the Lords Proprietors of Carolina, for the Surrender of their Title and Interest in that Province to His Majesty. (Repealed by Statute Law Revision Act 1867 (30 & 31 Vict. c. 59))
Preservation of Woods, America Act 1728 (repealed)	2 Geo. 2. c. 35	14 May 1729
An Act for better Preservation of His Majesty's Woods in America, and for the Encouragement of the Importation of Naval Stores from thence; and to encourage the Importation of Masts, Yards, and Bowsprits, from that Part of Great Britain called Scotland. (Repealed by Statute Law Revision Act 1867 (30 & 31 Vict. c. 59))
Merchant Seamen Act 1728 (repealed)	2 Geo. 2. c. 36	14 May 1729
An Act for the better Regulation and Government of Seamen in the Merchants Service. (Repealed by Merchant Seamen Act 1835 (5 & 6 Will. 4. c. 19))

=== Private acts ===
Short title	Citation	Royal assent
Long title
Brotherson's Naturalization Act 1728	2 Geo. 2. c. 1 Pr.	18 February 1729
An Act to naturalize Peter Frere Brotherson.
Exemplifying wills of James and John, Earls of Anglesey and making them evidence in courts of Britain and Ireland.	2 Geo. 2. c. 2 Pr.	24 March 1729
An Act for exemplifying the several Wills and Codicils of James late Earl of Anglesey and John late Earl of Anglesey; and for making the same Evidence in all Courts of Law and Equity in Great Britain and Ireland.
Thomas Scawen's and others' estates: power to make leases of manors and lands in Cornwall, according to the custom of the county and of the manors in which they lie.	2 Geo. 2. c. 3 Pr.	24 March 1729
An Act to enable Thomas Scawen Esquire, and others, to make Leases of several Manors and Lands in Cornwall, according to the Custom of that County, and of the several Manors in which the same do lie.
Naturalization of Peter Lapierre, John Benezet, Stephen Teissier, Godfrey Schreve and others.	2 Geo. 2. c. 4 Pr.	24 March 1729
An Act for naturalizing Peter Lapierre, John Stephen Benezet, Stephen Tessier, Godfrey Schreve, and others.
Naturalization of John Dillenius, Bridget Pollard and John Elout.	2 Geo. 2. c. 5 Pr.	24 March 1729
An Act for naturalizing John Jacob Dillenius, Bridget Pollard, and John Elout.
Passano's Naturalization Act 1728	2 Geo. 2. c. 6 Pr.	24 March 1729
An Act for naturalizing James Passano.
Sale of two undivided fourth parts of the manors and lands of and in Steane (Northamptonshire), the inheritance of Lady Mary Grey and Jemima Campbell, and purchase and settlement of an entire estate from the proceeds.	2 Geo. 2. c. 7 Pr.	14 May 1729
An Act for Sale of Two undivided Fourth Parts of the Manor and Lands of and in Steane, in the County of Northampton, the Inheritance of the Right Honourable the Lady Mary Grey and Jemima Campbell; and for laying out the Money arising by such Sale in the Purchase of an entire Estate, to be settled to the same Uses.
John Earl of Grandison and James Lord Villier's Estates Act 1728	2 Geo. 2. c. 8 Pr.	14 May 1729
An Act for settling the Estates of John Earl of Grandison in the Kingdom of Ireland, and James Fitzgerald Villiers Esquire, commonly called Lord Villiers, his Son and Heir Apparent, pursuant to an Agreement made before, and in Consideration of, the Marriage of the said Lord Villiers with Jane his Wife.
Viscount Molyneux's Estate Act 1728	2 Geo. 2. c. 9 Pr.	14 May 1729
An Act for selling Part of the settled Estate, lying in the County of Lancaster, of Richard Lord Viscount Molyneux in the Kingdom of Ireland, for raising Money to discharge his Father's Incumbrances thereon, and likewise for making Provision for his Brothers and Sisters, and for the Payment of his own Debts; and for settling other Lands as an Equivalent for the same.
Chaytor's Estate Act 1728	2 Geo. 2. c. 10 Pr.	14 May 1729
An Act to enable Henry Chaytor Gentleman to limit a Jointure to a Wife, and to let Leases for Twenty-one Years of his Estate at Crost, in the County of York.
Colesworth's Estate Act 1728	2 Geo. 2. c. 11 Pr.	14 May 1729
An Act to enable Robert Cotesworth Esquire to sell Part of an Estate held by Lease of the Bishop of Durham, for Discharge of his Debts.
Gray's Estate Act 1728	2 Geo. 2. c. 12 Pr.	14 May 1729
An Act for the more effectual putting in Execution an Act of Parliament, made and passed in the Twelfth Year of the Reign of His late Majesty King George the First, intituled, "An Act for the Sale of several Estates of Henry Grey Esquire, in the County of Southampton; and for settling other Estates, of equal Value, in the Counties of Berks and Wilts, to the same Uses." (Note: Gray's Estate Act 1725 (12 Geo. 1. c. 27 Pr.))
Rodd's Estate Act 1728	2 Geo. 2. c. 13 Pr.	14 May 1729
An Act to vest several Messuages, Lands, and Tenements, in the Parish of Stoke Canon, in the County of Devon, in Trustees, to be sold, for the Payment of the Debts of Bamfyld Rodd Esquire, deceased.
Lamplugh's Estate Act 1728	2 Geo. 2. c. 14 Pr.	14 May 1729
An Act for vesting in Thomas Lamplugh Clerk, and his Heirs, the Rectory of Felkirk, in the County of York, being Leasehold for Three Lives, comprized in his Marriage Settlement; and for settling other Fee-simple Lands and Tenements, in Potto, in the same County, of better Value, in Lieu thereof.
Perrot's Estate Act 1728	2 Geo. 2. c. 15 Pr.	14 May 1729
An Act for vesting in Trustees the several Manors and Lands therein mentioned, the Estate of Henry Perrot Esquire, in Trust for him and his Heirs, free from the Charges of his Marriage Settlement, on his settling other Estates, of greater Value, to the same Uses, in Lieu thereof.
Radcliffe's Estate Act 1728	2 Geo. 2. c. 16 Pr.	14 May 1729
An Act for Sale of Part of the Estate of Walter Radcliffe Esquire, in the Counties of Devon and Somerset; and for settling other Lands, of equal Value, in the said County of Devon, to the same Uses, in Lieu thereof.
Boate's Estate Act 1728	2 Geo. 2. c. 17 Pr.	14 May 1729
An Act for vesting all the Lands and Hereditaments in the County of Tipperary, in the Kingdom of Ireland, late the Estate of Godfrey Boate Esquire, late One of the Justices of His Majesty's Court of King's Bench in that Kingdom, deceased, in Trustees, to be sold, for the Payment of the Debts of the said Godfrey Boate; and for other Purposes.
Carter's Estate Act 1728	2 Geo. 2. c. 18 Pr.	14 May 1729
An Act for Sale of the Estate of William Carter Esquire, in the Counties of Denbigh, Flint, and Carnarvon; and to settle other Manors and Lands, in the County of Lincoln, of greater Value, to the same Uses.
Chipping Barnet (Hertfordshire) Inclosure and Poor Relief Act 1728	2 Geo. 2. c. 19 Pr.	14 May 1729
An Act for enclosing Part of a Common, called Barnet Common, belonging to the Manor of Chipping Barnet, in the County of Hertford; and for vesting a certain Annual Rent Charge in Trustees, for the Benefit of the Poor of the Parish of Chipping Barnet for ever.
Vesting advowson of Brafferton vicarage (Yorkshire) in His Majesty, in exchange for advowson of Bishopthorpe vicarage (Yorkshire) thereby vested in the Archbishop of York.	2 Geo. 2. c. 20 Pr.	14 May 1729
An Act for vesting the Advowson of the Vicarage of Brafferton, in the County of York, in His Majesty, in Exchange for the Advowson of the Vicarage of Bishopthorp, in the same County, thereby vested in the Archbishop of York.
William Greyham's Estate Act 1728	2 Geo. 2. c. 21 Pr.	14 May 1729
An Act to enable William Graham, Son of John Graham, late Alderman of Drogheda in the Kingdom of Ireland, to make Leases of several Parts of his Estate, in the Counties of Lowth and Meath, and in the County of the Town of Drogheda, for the better Improvement thereof.
Elsdon Inclosure Act 1728	2 Geo. 2. c. 22 Pr.	14 May 1729
An Act for dividing and enclosing the Common called Elsdon Common, in the Parish of Elsdon, in the County of Northumberland.
Exemplifying the will of Edmund Warneford and making it evidence in all courts of law and equity.	2 Geo. 2. c. 23 Pr.	14 May 1729
An Act for exemplifying the last Will of Edmund Warneford Esquire; and for making the same Evidence in all Courts of Law and Equity in Great Britain and Ireland.
Thomas Ridler's Estate Act 1728	2 Geo. 2. c. 24 Pr.	14 May 1729
An Act to enable Kinard De la Bere Esquire, Committee of the Estate of Thomas Ridler Esquire, a Lunatic, to sell and dispose of Part of the Personal Estate of the said Lunatic, for the Payment of his Debts.
Hadleigh (Suffolk) Inclosure and Poor Relief Act 1728	2 Geo. 2. c. 25 Pr.	14 May 1729
An Act for enclosing Aldham and Boyne Commons, belonging to the Parish of Hadleigh, in the County of Suffolk, for the better Maintenance of the Poor of the said Parish.
James Moore's Name and William Smythe's Estate Act 1728	2 Geo. 2. c. 26 Pr.	14 May 1729
An Act to enable James Moore, and his Issue Male, to take the Surname of Smythe, according to the Will of William Smythe Esquire, deceased; and for vesting in Trustees Two Thousand Three Hundred and Sixteen Pounds, Sixteen Shillings, and Ten Pence, South Sea Annuities, Part of the Estate of the said William Smythe, to be sold, for the Purposes therein mentioned.
Thurnscoe Inclosure Act 1728	2 Geo. 2. c. 27 Pr.	14 May 1729
An Act for confirming the Enclosure and Division of the Common Fields and Common Grounds within the Parish of Thurnscoe, in the County of York.
Confirming exchanges, allotments, divisions and inclosures of lands in Wick Rissington (Gloucestershire) and establishing a yearly payment to rector in lieu of tithes.	2 Geo. 2. c. 28 Pr.	14 May 1729
An Act for confirming Exchanges, Allotments, Divisions, and Enclosures, of Lands, in the Parish of Wick-Rissington, in the County of Gloucester; and for establishing the Payment of a Yearly Sum to the Rector and his Successors, in Lieu of Tithes, pursuant to Agreements between Vincent Oakley Esquire, deceased, and the other Proprietors of the said Lands.
Humfrey Warley Birch: enabling him and his issue male to take the surname Wyrley, pursuant to the deed of settlement made on the marriage of Peter Birch to the daughter of Humfrey Wyrley (deceased).	2 Geo. 2. c. 29 Pr.	14 May 1729
An Act to enable Humfrey Wyrley Birch Esquire, and his Heirs and Issue Male, to take and use the Surname of Wyrley, pursuant to the Deed of Settlement made on the Marriage of Peter Birch Doctor in Divinity, with the Daughter of Humfrey Wyrley Esquire, deceased.
Stafford's Name Act 1728	2 Geo. 2. c. 30 Pr.	14 May 1729
An Act to enable Arthur Geoghegan, alias Stafford, Esquire, to take upon him the Surname of Stafford only.
Cobb's Divorce Act 1728	2 Geo. 2. c. 31 Pr.	14 May 1729
An Act to dissolve the Marriage of Thomas Cobb with Rachel Krebs; and to enable him to marry again; and for other Purposes therein mentioned.
Naturalization of John Jullian and Isaac Panchaud Act 1728	2 Geo. 2. c. 32 Pr.	14 May 1729
An Act for naturalizing John Jullian and Isaac Panchaud.

=== Sources ===
- Pickering, Danby, ed. (1765). "Anno secundo Georgii II". The Statutes at Large. Vol. 16: From the Second to the 9th Year of King George II. Cambridge: Joseph Bentham. pp. 1–115 – via Internet Archive.
- Pickering, Danby, ed. (1765). "Anno secundo Georgii II". The Statutes at Large. Vol. 16: From the Second to the 9th Year of King George II. Cambridge: Joseph Bentham. pp. 1–115 – via Google Books.
- Journals of the House of Commons. Vol. 21. London: His Majesty's Stationery Office. 1803. pp. 184–390 – via Google Books.
- Chronological Table of and Index to the Statutes. Vol. 1: To the End of the Session 59 Vict. Sess. 2 (1895) (13th ed.). London: Her Majesty's Stationery Office. 1896. pp. 99–100 – via Google Books.

== See also ==
- List of acts of the Parliament of Great Britain
