= Southampton Improvement Act 1844 =

Southampton Marsh Act 1844
- Act of Parliament
- Parliament of the United Kingdom
- Long title: An Act for improving the Marsh and other Common Lands, and extending Rights of Common and of Recreation, within the Town and County of the Town of Southampton.
- Citation: 7 & 8 Vict. c. liv
- Introduced by: Thomas Greene (Commons)
- Territorial extent: County of the Town of Southampton

Dates
- Royal assent: 4 July 1844

Other legislation
- Amended by: Southampton Marsh and Markets Act 1865; Hampshire Act 1983

Status: Amended

Southampton Improvement Act 1844
- Act of Parliament
- Parliament of the United Kingdom
- Long title: An Act for paving, lighting, draining, cleansing and otherwise improving the Town of Southampton and for removing and preventing Nuisances and Annoyances therein.
- Citation: 7 & 8 Vict. c. lxxv
- Introduced by: Thomas Greene (Commons)
- Territorial extent: County of the Town of Southampton except the tything of Portswood and Southampton Common

Dates
- Royal assent: 19 July 1844

Other legislation
- Repeals/revokes: Southampton Improvement Act 1770; Southampton Poor Relief Act 1772; Southampton Improvement Act 1810
- Amended by: SI 1962/505 (L), S.I.1966/563, Hampshire Act 1983

Status: Amended

Text of statute as originally enacted

The Southampton Marsh Act 1844 (7 & 8 Vict. c. liv) and Southampton Improvement Act 1844 (7 & 8 Vict. c. lxxv) were two separate local acts of the United Kingdom Parliament giving Southampton Town Council more powers within the town.

The first act (also called the Southampton Marsh Improvement Act 1844) allowed the council to protect common land from development, which allowed the council to turn the Southampton Common into a public park – and set the path for the creation of the Southampton Central Parks.

The second act allowed increasing sanitation work – like constructing sewers and regulating slaughterhouses, as well as allowing the authority to widen and pave streets, funded by a local rate charged at no more than a 'shilling in the pound' (5% of the rateable value).

== Effect ==
There were pre-existing improvement commissioners established under acts from 1770 to 1810 for paving and lighting the town, at a time when corporations of ancient boroughs like Southampton were corrupt and inefficient. The Municipal Corporations Act 1835 reformed the corporations, and the Southampton Improvement Act 1844 repealed the earlier acts as regards Southampton, abolished the former improvement commissioners, and transferred their responsibilities to a new board of commissioners, which comprised all the members of the town council of the reformed corporation, augmented by 32 others elected by ratepayers of the parishes within the town.

The effect of the legislation was significant, with it giving the town council significantly more power. The act also allowed for the area between Southampton Terminus railway station and the Woolston Floating Bridge, which at the time was an undrained marsh to be developed on by the London and Southampton Railway. This would become part of the Southampton Docks. At present, a large part of the area is now Ocean Village. The revenue raised by the sale allowed the council to acquire land. This was used for local improvements including more recreational space around the town, and widening roads.

In 1846, part of the Salisbury and Southampton Canal that utilised an old ditch running along the Town Walls was filled in, in response to a woman falling into the abandoned ditch and dying in 1841.

In 1859, Sir John Stuart, the Vice-Chancellor, made a landmark ruling that the provisions of the Marsh Improvement Act prevented the council holding a cattle fair on the park's cricket pitch, as the resulting damage to the turf impaired the statutory requirement to provide a space for leisure.

The short title Southampton Marsh Act 1844 was given by the Southampton Marsh and Markets Act 1865, which also gave the 1844 act and itself together the collective citation Southampton Marsh and Markets Acts 1844 and 1865.

== Primary sources ==
- House of Commons Journal vol. 99
- House of Lords Journal vol. 76
- A collection of the local and personal acts, declared public, and to be judicially noticed, passed in the seventh and eighth year of the reign of Her Majesty Queen Victoria : being the fourth session of the fourteenth parliament of the United Kingdom of Great Britain and Ireland
  - c. liv: vol. 2 pp. 1953–2004
  - c. lxxv: vol. 4 pp. 3657–3784
- "Acts of the Parliaments of the United Kingdom; Part 30 (1844)". Chronological Tables of Local Acts. Legislation.gov.uk.
