= Merchant Seamen Act 1844 =

Act of the Parliament of the United Kingdom

- Act of Parliament
- Parliament of the United Kingdom
- Long title: An Act to amend and consolidate the Laws relating to Merchant Seamen; and for keeping a Register of Seamen.
- Citation: 7 & 8 Vict. c. 112
- Territorial extent: United Kingdom

Dates
- Royal assent: 5 September 1844
- Commencement: 5 September 1844 (Note: The Acts of Parliament (Commencement) Act 1793.)
- Repealed: 1 May 1855
Other legislation
| Amends | See § Repealed enactments |
| Repeals/revokes | See § Repealed enactments |
| Amended by | Navigation Act 1849 |
| Repealed by | Merchant Shipping Repeal Act 1854 |
| Relates to | Merchant Seamen Act 1728; Merchant Seamen Act 1835; Merchant Shipping Repeal Act 1854; Merchant Shipping Act 1894 |

Status: Repealed

Text of statute as originally enacted

The Merchant Seamen Act 1844 (7 & 8 Vict. c. 112), also known as the Merchant Shipping Act 1844, was an act of the Parliament of the United Kingdom that amended and consolidated various enactments relating to merchant shipping in the United Kingdom.

== Provisions ==
Section 1 of the act repealed the Merchant Seamen Act 1835 (5 & 6 Will. 4. c. 19) "except so far as relates to the Establishment, Maintenance and Regulations of the Office called "The General Register of Merchant Seamen"".

== Subsequent developments ==
The whole act was repealed by section 4 of, and the schedule to, the Merchant Shipping Repeal Act 1854 (17 & 18 Vict. c. 120), which came into force on 1 May 1855.
