= Merchant Seamen Act 1728 =

Act of the Parliament of Great Britain

- Act of Parliament
- Parliament of Great Britain
- Long title: An Act for the better Regulation and Government of Seamen in the Merchants Service.
- Citation: 2 Geo. 2. c. 36
- Territorial extent: Great Britain

Dates
- Royal assent: 14 May 1729
- Commencement: 21 January 1729 (Note: Start of session.)
- Repealed: 31 July 1835
Other legislation
Amended by	Taxation, etc. Act 1761; Continuance of Laws (No. 2) Act 1734; Continuance of Laws, etc. Act 1749
Repealed by	Merchant Seamen Act 1835
Relates to	Merchant Seamen Act 1844; Merchant Shipping Repeal Act 1854; Merchant Shipping Act 1894

Status: Repealed

Text of statute as originally enacted

The Merchant Seamen Act 1728 (2 Geo. 2. c. 36) was an act of the Parliament of Great Britain. It was a significant piece of British legislation passed in 1729. The act was originally stipulated to run five years but was renewed periodically until it was made perpetual by the Merchant Seamen Act 1762 (2 Geo. 3. c. 31) in 1761. By mandating a formalized wage contract, the act deterred (though did not curtail) captains from changing agreed-upon routes of their vessels, reduced desertion rates, and allowed for seamen to seek liberation from employers who broke contracts.

One of the main functions of the British Admiralty court system, which expanded significantly in the late seventeenth century, was to handle wage disputes between hired seamen on the one side and captains, owners, and merchants on the other. Ambiguous wage agreements led to many of these disputes. To improve the clarity of merchant wage contracts, the act mandated that such contracts include the specified principals of agreement, the wages, the date of signing on, and advance pay. Wages were to be paid, unless contrary terms appeared in the written agreement, upon final discharge or within thirty days of the ship's entry at a customs house (whichever was earlier). Seamen promised obedience, duty, and service. Typically, merchant wage contracts specified seamen's responsibilities while the ship was at port. Seamen were generally required to stay on board until the ship was completely unloaded. However, any agreement relating to food, drink, or privileges was ordinarily left to custom and not included in the formal contract.

Wage contracts after the act's passage usually specified the voyage to be taken, either precisely or generally. Prior to the act's passage, disputes between seamen and merchants often arose due to changes in a ship's itinerary. Since wages were generally paid only at the end of a voyage, the date and location of voyage's termination was of great importance to seamen. Yet captains or shipowners habitually strayed from the agreed-upon itinerary, and seamen, who often relied upon non-formalized contracts or verbal agreements, had little choice but to acquiesce to such changes. Even after the passage of the act in 1729, ambiguously written voyage itineraries continued to generate legal disputes. Although some contracts precisely plotted a voyage's route and stipulated that the contract would be voided if the captain strayed, other contracts gave the captain permission to steer the ship as he saw “fit” or to the places “most advantageous.”

Historian Marcus Rediker notes that the act, in mandating formal contracts, was significant in the development of a system of free wage labor at sea, “as it signaled a momentous breakdown in a long-standing customary agreement between seafaring masters and men.” The now-required formalized contract supplanted unwritten agreements based on customs of the sea, or nebulous written agreements with uncertain terms between seamen and their employers. The act also typified the shift in the eighteenth century towards a free wage system and away from a “share” system of wages (wherein seamen received a proportional share of the voyage's earnings). The latter system was typified by a lack of formalized contracts. This system also generated tension between employers who aimed to fetter seamen to their ships and seamen who often found it advantageous to desert from unprofitable voyages.

The act also improved seamen desertion rates. In the eighteenth century there was fierce competition for British seamen, particularly during wartime. The Royal Navy, the merchant service, and privateering outfits, which offered the prospect of huge rewards, vied with one another to enlist seamen. With so many opportunities available to seamen, desertion rates were high A common practice in the late 1720s was for sailors to threaten to desert the ship after cargo was loaded, refusing to leave the port without coming to new terms. This slowed the flow of commodities and forced the merchants to pay higher wages. By formalizing the contract process, the act protected merchants from this tactic.

The act took additional steps to prevent desertion. Prior to the act's enactment, admiralty law had protected the interests of the merchants by requiring the forfeiture of wages if a sailor was mutinous or disobedient, if he deserted a ship, or if he stole or embezzled goods or money. The act further strengthened the merchants’ position. Deserters, in addition to losing their wages, were now required to pay a £5 fine and were put into “hard Labour” or 14–30 days at the nearest “house of correction.” The punishment for time away from the ship without consent was the docking of two days’ pay for each day away. For sailors who left the ship without completing the unloading of cargo, the penalty was forfeiting a full month of pay.

The act also provided seamen with additional protections. Prior to the act, Vice Admiralty courts had been very reluctant to liberate sailors from ships. Once the act was passed, courts were increasingly willing to allow liberation if contracts were broken. One provision of the act ensured that mariners who joined a Royal Navy ship were entitled to the full pay they had earned from the ship they left behind. Mariners were generally successful in using the Admiralty Courts to escape prior contracts and collect the fees they had earned.

== Subsequent developments ==
The act was continued until the end of the next session of parliament after 25 March 1749 by section 1 of the Continuance of Laws (No. 2) Act 1734 (8 Geo. 2. c. 21).

The act was continued until the end of the next session of parliament after 25 March 1764 by section 6 of the Continuance of Laws, etc. Act 1749 (23 Geo. 2. c. 26).

The act was made perpetual and extended to British North America by the Merchant Seamen Act 1762 (2 Geo. 3. c. 31).

The whole act was repealed by section 1 of the Merchant Seamen Act 1835 (5 & 6 Will. 4. c. 19), which came into force on 31 July 1835.
