= Duchy of Cornwall Act 1844 =

Act of the Parliament of the United Kingdom

Duchy of Cornwall Act 1844 (Note: The citation of this act by this short title was authorised by section 5 of, and the second schedule to, the Statute Law Revision Act 1948. Due to the repeal of those provisions, it is now authorised by section 19(2) of the Interpretation Act 1978.)
- Act of Parliament
- Parliament of the United Kingdom
- Long title: An Act to enable the Council of His Royal Highness Albert Edward Prince of Wales to sell and exchange Lands and Enfranchise Copyholds, Parcel of the Possessions of the Duchy of Cornwall, to purchase other Lands, and for other Purposes. (Note: These words are printed against this act in the second column of the second schedule to the Statute Law Revision Act 1948, which is headed "Title".)
- Citation: 7 & 8 Vict. c. 65
- Territorial extent: United Kingdom

Dates
- Royal assent: 6 August 1844
- Commencement: 6 August 1844 (Note: The Acts of Parliament (Commencement) Act 1793.)
Other legislation
| Amended by | Supreme Court of Judicature (Consolidation) Act 1925; Mental Treatment Act 1930 |
| Relates to | Duchy of Cornwall Management Act 1863; Assessionable Manors Award Act 1848 |

Status: Amended

Text of statute as originally enacted

Revised text of statute as amended

Text of the Duchy of Cornwall Act 1844 as in force today (including any amendments) within the United Kingdom, from legislation.gov.uk.

The Duchy of Cornwall Act 1844 (7 & 8 Vict. c. 65) is an act of the Parliament of the United Kingdom.

As of 2026, the act remains in force in the United Kingdom.

== Subsequent developments ==
Section 40 of the Duchy of Cornwall Management Act 1863 (26 & 27 Vict. c. 49) provided that nothing in that act takes away, alters or prejudices, further or otherwise than as the same are thereby expressly rescinded or altered, any powers or provisions contained in the Duchy of Cornwall Act 1844.

See also sections 6 and 14 of the Assessionable Manors Award Act 1848 (11 & 12 Vict. c. 83).
