= List of acts of the Parliament of the United Kingdom from 1844 =

This is a complete list of acts of the Parliament of the United Kingdom for the year 1844.

Note that the first parliament of the United Kingdom was held in 1801; parliaments between 1707 and 1800 were either parliaments of Great Britain or of Ireland). For acts passed up until 1707, see the list of acts of the Parliament of England and the list of acts of the Parliament of Scotland. For acts passed from 1707 to 1800, see the list of acts of the Parliament of Great Britain. See also the list of acts of the Parliament of Ireland.

For acts of the devolved parliaments and assemblies in the United Kingdom, see the list of acts of the Scottish Parliament, the list of acts of the Northern Ireland Assembly, and the list of acts and measures of Senedd Cymru; see also the list of acts of the Parliament of Northern Ireland.

The number shown after each act's title is its chapter number. Acts passed before 1963 are cited using this number, preceded by the year(s) of the reign during which the relevant parliamentary session was held; thus the Union with Ireland Act 1800 is cited as "39 & 40 Geo. 3 c. 67", meaning the 67th act passed during the session that started in the 39th year of the reign of George III and which finished in the 40th year of that reign. Note that the modern convention is to use Arabic numerals in citations (thus "41 Geo. 3" rather than "41 Geo. III"). Acts of the last session of the Parliament of Great Britain and the first session of the Parliament of the United Kingdom are both cited as "41 Geo. 3".

Some of these acts have a short title. Some of these acts have never had a short title. Some of these acts have a short title given to them by later acts, such as by the Short Titles Act 1896.

== 7 & 8 Vict. ==
The fourth session of the 14th Parliament of the United Kingdom, which met from 1 February 1844 until 5 September 1844.

=== Public general acts ===
Short title	Citation	Royal assent
Long title
Metropolis Improvements Act 1844 (repealed)	7 & 8 Vict. c. 1	5 March 1844
An Act to enlarge the Powers of an Act of the Fourth and Fifth Years of Her present Majesty, (Note: Metropolitan Improvements Act 1841 (4 & 5 Vict. c. 40)) empowering the Commissioners of Her Majesty's Woods to raise Money for certain Improvements in the Metropolis, on the Security of the Land Revenues of the Crown within the County of Middlesex and City of London. (Repealed by Crown Estate Act 1961 (9 & 10 Eliz. 2. c. 55))
Admiralty Offences Act 1844 (repealed)	7 & 8 Vict. c. 2	5 March 1844
An Act for the more speedy Trial of Offences committed on the High Seas. (Repealed by Criminal Law Act 1967 (c. 58))
Actions for Gaming Act 1844 (repealed)	7 & 8 Vict. c. 3	5 March 1844
An Act to stay Proceedings for Three Calendar Months, and till the End of the present Session of Parliament, in certain Actions under the Provisions of several Statutes for the Prevention of excessive Gaming, and to prevent any Proceedings being taken under those Statutes during such limited Time. (Repealed by Statute Law Revision Act 1874 (No. 2) (37 & 38 Vict. c. 96))
National Debt Act 1844 (repealed)	7 & 8 Vict. c. 4	22 March 1844
An Act for transferring Three Pounds Ten Shillings per Centum per Annum Annuities One thousand eight hundred and eighteen into Annuities of Three Pounds Five Shillings per Centum per Annum and New Three Pounds per Centum per Annum Annuities. (Repealed by Statute Law Revision Act 1870 (33 & 34 Vict. c. 69))
National Debt (No. 2) Act 1844 (repealed)	7 & 8 Vict. c. 5	22 March 1844
An Act for transferring certain Annuities of Three Pounds Ten Shillings per Centum per Annum and Government Debentures into Annuities of Three Pounds Five Shillings per Centum per Annum and New Three Pounds per Centum per Annum Annuities. (Repealed by Statute Law Revision Act 1870 (33 & 34 Vict. c. 69))
Supply Act 1844 (repealed)	7 & 8 Vict. c. 6	22 March 1844
An Act to apply the Sum of Eight Millions out of the Consolidated Fund to the Service of the Year One thousand eight hundred and forty-four. (Repealed by Statute Law Revision Act 1874 (No. 2) (37 & 38 Vict. c. 96))
Gaming Transactions Act 1844 (repealed)	7 & 8 Vict. c. 7	22 March 1844
An Act to indemnify Witnesses who may give Evidence during this Session before either House of Parliament touching Gaming Transactions. (Repealed by Statute Law Revision Act 1874 (No. 2) (37 & 38 Vict. c. 96))
Teachers of Schools (Ireland) Act 1844 (repealed)	7 & 8 Vict. c. 8	22 March 1844
An Act to facilitate the Recovery, by summary Process, of small Sums due to the Teachers of Schools in Ireland. (Repealed by Summary Jurisdiction (Ireland) Act 1850 (13 & 14 Vict. c. 102))
Mutiny Act 1844 (repealed)	7 & 8 Vict. c. 9	2 April 1844
An Act for punishing Mutiny and Desertion, and for the better Payment of the Army and their Quarters. (Repealed by Statute Law Revision Act 1874 (No. 2) (37 & 38 Vict. c. 96))
Indemnity Act 1844 (repealed)	7 & 8 Vict. c. 10	2 April 1844
An Act to indemnify such Persons in the United Kingdom as have omitted to qualify themselves for Offices and Employments, and to extend the Time limited for those Purposes respectively until the Twenty-fifth Day of March Chie thousand eight hundred and forty-five. (Repealed by Promissory Oaths Act 1871 (34 & 35 Vict. c. 48))
Marine Mutiny Act 1844 (repealed)	7 & 8 Vict. c. 11	2 April 1844
An Act for the Regulation of Her Majesty's Royal Marine Forces while on shore. (Repealed by Statute Law Revision Act 1874 (No. 2) (37 & 38 Vict. c. 96))
International Copyright Act 1844 (repealed)	7 & 8 Vict. c. 12	10 May 1844
An Act to amend the Law relating to International Copyright. (Repealed by Copyright Act 1911 (1 & 2 Geo. 5. c. 46))
Forest of Dean Act 1844 or the Dean Forest (Encroachments) Act 1844 (repealed)	7 & 8 Vict. c. 13	10 May 1844
An Act to extend until the First Day of January One thousand eight hundred and forty-five, and to the end of the next session of Parliament the time within which conveyances may be made on behalf of the Crown of and disputes settled with regard to encroachments in the forest of Dean. (Repealed by Wild Creatures and Forest Laws Act 1971 (c. 47))
Exchequer Bills Act 1844 (repealed)	7 & 8 Vict. c. 14	10 May 1844
An Act for raising the Sum of Eighteen millions four hundred and seven thousand three hundred Pounds by Exchequer Bills for the Service of the Year One thousand eight hundred and forty-four. (Repealed by Statute Law Revision Act 1874 (No. 2) (37 & 38 Vict. c. 96))
Factory Act 1844 or the Textile Factory Act 1844 or the Factories Act 1844 or Graham's Factory Act (repealed)	7 & 8 Vict. c. 15	6 June 1844
An Act to amend the Laws relating to Labour in Factories. (Repealed by Factory and Workshop Act 1878 (41 & 42 Vict. c. 16))
Customs Act 1844 (repealed)	7 & 8 Vict. c. 16	6 June 1844
An Act to amend the Laws relating to the Customs. (Repealed by Customs (Repeal) Act 1845 (8 & 9 Vict. c. 84))
West Indian Islands Relief Act 1844 (repealed)	7 & 8 Vict. c. 17	6 June 1844
An Act for giving additional Powers to the Commissioners for the Relief of certain of Her Majesty's Colonies and Plantations in the West Indies. (Repealed by West India Loan Act 1879 (42 & 43 Vict. c. 16))
Courts-martial in India Act 1844 (repealed)	7 & 8 Vict. c. 18	6 June 1844
An Act to remove Doubts as to the Power of appointing, convening, and confirming the Sentences of Courts-martial in the East Indies. (Repealed by Regulation of the Forces Act 1881 (44 & 45 Vict. c. 57))
Inferior Courts Act 1844 (repealed)	7 & 8 Vict. c. 19	6 June 1844
An Act for regulating the Bailiffs of Inferior Courts. (Repealed by Administration of Justice Act 1977 (c. 38))
Edinburgh Debt Act 1844 (repealed)	7 & 8 Vict. c. 20	6 June 1844
An Act to amend an Act of the First and Second Years of Her present Majesty, (Note: Debt of City of Edinburgh, etc. Act, 1838 (1 & 2 Vict. c. 55)) for securing the Debt due by the City of Edinburgh to the Public. (Repealed by Leith Harbour and Docks Act 1875 (38 & 39 Vict. c. clx) (Note: Incorrectly cited as "38–9 Vict. c. cix" in the Chronological Table of the Statutes.))
Stamps Act 1844 (repealed)	7 & 8 Vict. c. 21	6 June 1844
An Act to reduce the Stamp Duties on Policies of Sea Insurance and on certain other Instruments, and to repeal the Duties on certain Bonds, and the Law requiring Public Notaries in Ireland to deliver Accounts of Bills and Notes noted by them. (Repealed by Inland Revenue Repeal Act 1870 (33 & 34 Vict. c. 99))
Gold and Silver Wares Act 1844 (repealed)	7 & 8 Vict. c. 22	4 July 1844
An Act to amend the Laws now in force for preventing Frauds and Abuses in the marking of Gold and Silver Wares in England. (Repealed by Hallmarking Act 1973 (c. 43))
Assaults (Ireland) Act 1844 (repealed)	7 & 8 Vict. c. 23	4 July 1844
An Act to continue for Five Years an Act of the Second and Third Years of Her present Majesty, (Note: Assaults (Ireland) Act 1839 (2 & 3 Vict. c. 77)) for the better Prevention and Punishment of Assaults in Ireland. (Repealed by Statute Law Revision Act 1874 (No. 2) (37 & 38 Vict. c. 96))
Forestalling, Regrating, etc. Act 1844 (repealed)	7 & 8 Vict. c. 24	4 July 1844
An Act for abolishing the Offences of forestalling, regrating, and engrossing, and for repealing certain Statutes passed in restraint of Trade. (Repealed by Statute Law Revision Act 1892 (55 & 56 Vict. c. 19))
Vinegar Act 1844 (repealed)	7 & 8 Vict. c. 25	4 July 1844
An Act to repeal the Duty of Excise on Vinegar, and to make the Duties and Drawbacks now payable on Flint Glass the same as on Bottle Glass. (Repealed by Customs and Excise Act 1952 (15 & 16 Geo. 6 & 1 Eliz. 2. c. 44))
Slave Trade Act 1844 (repealed)	7 & 8 Vict. c. 26	4 July 1844
An Act for authorizing Her Majesty to carry into immediate Execution, by Orders in Council, any Treaties for the Suppression of the Slave Trade. (Repealed by Slave Trade Act 1873 (36 & 37 Vict. c. 88))
Recovery of Advowsons in Ireland Act 1844 (repealed)	7 & 8 Vict. c. 27	4 July 1844
An Act to explain and amend an Act of the last Session of Parliament, (Note: Limitation of Actions Act 1843 (6 & 7 Vict. c. 54)) intituled "An Act for extending to Ireland the Provisions not already in force there of an Act of the Third and Fourth Years of the Reign of the late King William the Fourth, (Note: Real Property Limitation Act 1833 (3 & 4 Will. 4. c. 27)) intituled 'An Act for the Limitation of Actions and Suits relating to Real Property, and for simplifying the Remedies for trying the Rights thereto;' and to explain and amend the said Act." (Repealed by Statute Law Revision Act 1874 (No. 2) (37 & 38 Vict. c. 96) and Statute of Limitations Act (Northern Ireland) 1958 (c. 10 (N.I.)))
Sugar Duties Act 1844 (repealed)	7 & 8 Vict. c. 28	4 July 1844
An Act for granting to Her Majesty, until the Fifth Day of July One thousand eight hundred and forty-five, certain Duties on Sugar imported into the United Kingdom, for the Service of the Year One thousand eight hundred and forty-four. (Repealed by Statute Law Revision Act 1861 (24 & 25 Vict. c. 101))
Night Poaching Act 1844	7 & 8 Vict. c. 29	4 July 1844
An Act to extend an Act of the Ninth Year of King George the Fourth, (Note: Night Poaching Act 1828 (9 Geo. 4. c. 69)) for the more effectual Prevention of Persons going armed by Night for the Destruction of Game.
Manchester Stipendiary Magistrate Act 1844 or the Stipendiary Magistrate for Manchester Act 1844 (repealed)	7 & 8 Vict. c. 30	4 July 1844
An Act to alter and amend an Act of the Fifty-third Year of King George the Third, (Note: Manchester Stipendiary Magistrate Act 1813 (53 Geo. 3. c. 72)) for the Appointment of a Stipendiary Magistrate to act within the Townships of Manchester and Salford. (Repealed by Manchester Division and Borough of Salford (Stipendiary Justices) Act 1878 (41 & 42 Vict. c. lv))
Warehousing of Foreign Goods (Manchester) Act 1844 (repealed)	7 & 8 Vict. c. 31	4 July 1844
An Act for the warehousing of Foreign Goods for Home Consumption at the Borough of Manchester in the County of Lancaster. (Repealed by Statute Law Revision Act 1894 (57 & 58 Vict. c. 56))
Bank Charter Act 1844 or the Peel Banking Act	7 & 8 Vict. c. 32	19 July 1844
An Act to regulate the Issue of Bank Notes, and for giving to the Bank of England certain Privileges for a limited Period.
County Rates Act 1844 (repealed)	7 & 8 Vict. c. 33	19 July 1844
An Act for facilitating the Collection of County Rates, and for relieving High Constables from Attendance at Quarter Sessions in certain Cases, and from certain other Duties. (Repealed by Statute Law (Repeals) Act 1971 (c. 52))
Prisons (Scotland) Act 1844 (repealed)	7 & 8 Vict. c. 34	19 July 1844
An Act to amend and continue until the First Day of September One thousand eight hundred and sixty-one, and to the End of the then next Session of Parliament, the Law with respect to Prisons and Prison Discipline in Scotland. (Repealed by Prisons (Scotland) Act 1860 (23 & 24 Vict. c. 105))
Militia Ballots Suspension Act 1844 (repealed)	7 & 8 Vict. c. 35	19 July 1844
An Act to suspend until the Thirty-first Day of August One thousand eight hundred and forty-five the making of Lists and the Ballots and Enrolments for the Militia of the United Kingdom. (Repealed by Statute Law Revision Act 1874 (No. 2) (37 & 38 Vict. c. 96))
Turnpike Acts (Ireland) Act 1844	7 & 8 Vict. c. 36	19 July 1844
An Act to continue until the Thirty-first Day of July One thousand eight hundred and forty-five, and to the End of the then Session of Parliament, certain Acts for regulating Turnpike Roads in Ireland.
School Sites Act 1844	7 & 8 Vict. c. 37	19 July 1844
An Act to secure the Terms on which Grants are made by Her Majesty out of the Parliamentary Grant for the Education of the Poor; and to explain the Act of the Fifth Year of the Reign of Her present Majesty, (Note: School Sites Act 1841 (4 & 5 Vict. c. 38)) for the Conveyance of Sites for Schools.
Charitable Loan Societies (Ireland) Act 1844 (repealed)	7 & 8 Vict. c. 38	19 July 1844
An Act to amend an Act of the last Session, (Note: Charitable Loan Societies (Ireland) Act 1843 (6 & 7 Vict. c. 91)) to consolidate and amend the Laws for the Emulation of Charitable Loan Societies in Ireland. (Repealed by Statute Law Revision Act 1891 (54 & 55 Vict. c. 67))
Income Tax Act 1844 (repealed)	7 & 8 Vict. c. 39	19 July 1844
An Act to exempt from the Payment of Property Tax the Dividends on certain Annuities of Three Pounds Ten Shillings per Centum per Annum payable for the Quarter of the Year ending the Tenth Day of October One thousand eight hundred and forty-four. (Repealed by Statute Law Revision Act 1870 (33 & 34 Vict. c. 69))
Poor Rates Act 1844 (repealed)	7 & 8 Vict. c. 40	19 July 1844
An Act to continue until the First Day of October One thousand eight hundred and forty-five, and to the End of the then Session of Parliament, the Exemption of Inhabitants of Parishes, Townships, and Villages from Liability to be rated as such, in respect of Stock in Trade or other Property, to the Relief of the Poor. (Repealed by Statute Law Revision Act 1874 (No. 2) (37 & 38 Vict. c. 96))
Turnpike Acts (Great Britain) Act 1844 (repealed)	7 & 8 Vict. c. 41	19 July 1844
An Act to continue until the First Day of August One thousand eight hundred and forty-five, and to the End of the then Session of Parliament, certain Turnpike Acts. (Repealed by Statute Law Revision Act 1874 (No. 2) (37 & 38 Vict. c. 96))
Scotch and Irish Paupers Removal Act 1844 (repealed)	7 & 8 Vict. c. 42	19 July 1844
An Act to continue until the First Day of October One thousand eight hundred and forty-five, and to the End of the then Session of Parliament, Two Acts relating to the Removal of poor Persons born in Scotland and Ireland, and chargeable to Parishes in England. (Repealed by Poor Removal Act 1845 (8 & 9 Vict. c. 117))
Isle of Man Customs Act 1844 (repealed)	7 & 8 Vict. c. 43	19 July 1844
An Act to amend the Laws relating to the Customs in the Isle of Man. (Repealed by Customs (Repeal) Act 1845 (8 & 9 Vict. c. 84))
New Parishes (Scotland) Act 1844 (repealed)	7 & 8 Vict. c. 44	19 July 1844
An Act to facilitate the disjoining or dividing of extensive or populous Parishes, and the erecting of new Parishes, in Scotland. (Repealed by Abolition of Feudal Tenure etc. (Scotland) Act 2000 (asp 5))
Nonconformists Chapels Act 1844 or the Dissenters' Chapels Act 1844 (repealed)	7 & 8 Vict. c. 45	19 July 1844
An Act for the Regulation of Suits relating to Meeting Houses and other Property held for religious Purposes by Persons dissenting from the United Church of England and Ireland. (Repealed for England and Wales by Charities Act 1960 (8 & 9 Eliz. 2. c. 58))
Assessed Taxes, Property Tax, and Duty on Pensions and Offices of Profit Act 1844 (repealed)	7 & 8 Vict. c. 46	29 July 1844
An Act to continue, until the Fifth Day of April One thousand eight hundred and forty-six, Compositions for Assessed Taxes; and to amend certain Laws relating to Duties under the Management of the Commissioners of Stamps and Taxes. (Repealed by Taxes Management Act 1880 (43 & 44 Vict. c. 19))
Linen Manufactures (Ireland) Act 1844 (repealed)	7 & 8 Vict. c. 47	29 July 1844
An Act to amend and continue for Five Years, and to the End of the next Session of Parliament, certain Acts relating to Linen, Hempen, and other Manufactures in Ireland. (Repealed by Statute Law Revision Act (Northern Ireland) 1954 (c. 35 (N.I.)))
Butter and Cheese Trade Act 1844 (repealed)	7 & 8 Vict. c. 48	29 July 1844
An Act to repeal certain Acts for regulating the Trade in Butter and Cheese. (Repealed by Statute Law Revision Act 1874 (No. 2) (37 & 38 Vict. c. 96))
Post Office (Duties) Act 1844 (repealed)	7 & 8 Vict. c. 49	29 July 1844
An Act for the better Regulation of Colonial Posts. (Repealed by Post Office Act 1908 (8 Edw. 7. c. 48))
District Courts and Prisons Act 1844 (repealed)	7 & 8 Vict. c. 50	29 July 1844
An Act to extend the Powers of the Act (Note: District Courts and Prisons Act 1842 (5 & 6 Vict. c. 53)) for encouraging the Establishment of District Courts and Prisons. (Repealed by Prison Act 1865 (28 & 29 Vict. c. 126))
Soap Duties Allowances Act 1844 (repealed)	7 & 8 Vict. c. 51	29 July 1844
An Act to continue, until the End of the Session of Parliament next after the Thirty-first Day of July One thousand eight hundred and forty-six, certain of the Allowances of the Duty of Excise on Soap used in Manufactures. (Repealed by Statute Law Revision Act 1874 (No. 2) (37 & 38 Vict. c. 96))
Parish Constables Act 1844 (repealed)	7 & 8 Vict. c. 52	29 July 1844
An Act to extend the Powers of the Act (Note: Parish Constables Act 1842 (5 & 6 Vict. c. 109)) for the Appointment and Payment of Parish Constables. (Repealed by Statute Law Revision Act 1874 (No. 2) (37 & 38 Vict. c. 96), Statute Law Revision Act 1878 (41 & 42 Vict. c. 79) and Statute Law Revision Act 1953 (2 & 3 Eliz. 2. c. 5))
Disfranchisement of Sudbury Act 1844 (repealed)	7 & 8 Vict. c. 53	29 July 1844
An Act for Disfranchisement of the Borough of Sudbury. (Repealed by Statute Law Revision Act 1874 (No. 2) (37 & 38 Vict. c. 96))
Loan Societies Act 1844 (repealed)	7 & 8 Vict. c. 54	29 July 1844
An Act to continue until the First Day of October One thousand eight hundred and forty-five, and to the End of the then Session of Parliament, the Act (Note: Loan Societies Act 1840 (3 & 4 Vict. c. 110)) to amend the Laws relating to Loan Societies. (Repealed by Statute Law Revision Act 1874 (No. 2) (37 & 38 Vict. c. 96))
Copyhold Act 1844 or the Copyhold Lands Act 1844 (repealed)	7 & 8 Vict. c. 55	29 July 1844
An Act to amend and explain the Acts for the Commutation of certain Manorial Rights in respect of Lands of Copyhold and Customary Tenure, and in respect of other Lands subject to such Rights; and for facilitating the Enfranchisement of such Lands, and for the Improvement of such Tenure. (Repealed by Copyhold Act 1894 (57 & 58 Vict. c. 46))
Church Building (Banns and Marriages) Act 1844 (repealed)	7 & 8 Vict. c. 56	29 July 1844
An Act concerning Banns and Marriages in certain District Churches or Chapels. (Repealed by Statute Law (Repeals) Act 1974 (c. 22))
Western Australia Government Act 1844 (repealed)	7 & 8 Vict. c. 57	29 July 1844
An Act to continue until the Thirty-first Day of December One thousand eight hundred and forty-six, and to the End of the then next Session of Parliament, an Act of the Tenth Year of King George the Fourth, (Note: Government of Western Australia Act 1829 (10 Geo. 4. c. 22)) for providing for the Government of His Majesty's Settlements in Western Australia on the Western Coast of New Holland. (Repealed by Statute Law Revision Act 1874 (No. 2) (37 & 38 Vict. c. 96))
Actions for Gaming (No. 2) Act 1844 (repealed)	7 & 8 Vict. c. 58	29 July 1844
An Act further to stay, until the End of the next Session of Parliament, Proceedings in certain Actions under the Provisions of several Statutes for the Prevention of excessive Gaming; and to prevent any similar Proceedings being taken under those Statutes during such further limited Time. (Repealed by Statute Law Revision Act 1874 (No. 2) (37 & 38 Vict. c. 96))
Lecturers and Parish Clerks Act 1844	7 & 8 Vict. c. 59	29 July 1844
An Act for better regulating the Offices of Lecturers and Parish Clerks.
Trafalgar Square Act 1844	7 & 8 Vict. c. 60	6 August 1844
An Act to provide for the Care and Preservation of Trafalgar Square in the City of Westminster.
Counties (Detached Parts) Act 1844 (repealed)	7 & 8 Vict. c. 61	6 August 1844
An Act to annex detached Parts of Counties to the Counties in which they are situated. (Repealed by Local Government Act 1972 (c. 70))
Burning of Farm Buildings Act 1844 (repealed)	7 & 8 Vict. c. 62	6 August 1844
An Act to amend the Law as to burning Farm Buildings. (Repealed by Criminal Statutes Repeal Act 1861 (24 & 25 Vict. c. 95))
Party Processions (Ireland) Act 1844 (repealed)	7 & 8 Vict. c. 63	6 August 1844
An Act to continue until the First Day of June One thousand eight hundred and forty-five an Act of the Second and Third Years of His late Majesty, (Note: Party Processions (Ireland) Act 1832 (2 & 3 Will. 4. c. 118)) for restraining for Five Years, in certain Cases, Party Processions in Ireland. (Repealed by Statute Law Revision Act 1874 (No. 2) (37 & 38 Vict. c. 96))
National Debt (No. 3) Act 1844 (repealed)	7 & 8 Vict. c. 64	6 August 1844
An Act to provide for paying off such of the Three Pounds Ten Shillings per Centum Annuities and Government Debentures which are to be paid off under Two Acts passed in the present Session of Parliament. (Repealed by Statute Law Revision Act 1870 (33 & 34 Vict. c. 69))
Duchy of Cornwall Act 1844	7 & 8 Vict. c. 65	6 August 1844
An Act to enable the Council of His Royal Highness Albert Edward Prince of Wales to sell and exchange Lands and Enfranchise Copyholds, Parcel of the Possessions of the Duchy of Cornwall, to purchase other Lands, and for other Purposes.
Aliens Act 1844 or the Naturalization Act 1844 (repealed)	7 & 8 Vict. c. 66	6 August 1844
An Act to amend the Laws relating to Aliens. (Repealed by Naturalization Act 1870 (33 & 34 Vict. c. 14))
Post Horse Licence Duties (Ireland) Act 1844 (repealed)	7 & 8 Vict. c. 67	6 August 1844
An Act to transfer the Collection of the Duty on Licences to let Horses for Hire in Ireland from the Commissioners of Stamps to the Commissioners of Excise. (Repealed by Statute Law Revision Act 1878 (41 & 42 Vict. c. 79))
Ecclesiastical Courts Act 1844 (repealed)	7 & 8 Vict. c. 68	6 August 1844
An Act to suspend, until the Thirty-first Day of December One thousand eight hundred and forty-seven, the Operation of the new Arrangement of Dioceses, so far as it affects the existing Ecclesiastic Jurisdictions, and for obtaining Returns from and the Inspection of the Registries of such Jurisdictions. (Repealed by Statute Law Revision Act 1959 (7 & 8 Eliz. 2. c. 68))
Judicial Committee Act 1844	7 & 8 Vict. c. 69	6 August 1844
An Act for amending an Act passed in the Fourth Year of the Reign of His late Majesty, intituled "An Act for the better Administration of Justice in His Majesty’s Privy Council"; (Note: Judicial Committee Act 1833 (3 & 4 Will. 4. c. 41)) and to extend its Jurisdiction and Powers.
Debtors and Creditors Act 1844 (repealed)	7 & 8 Vict. c. 70	6 August 1844
An Act for facilitating Arrangements between Debtors and Creditors. (Repealed by Bankruptcy Repeal and Insolvent Court Act 1869 (32 & 33 Vict. c. 83))
Middlesex Sessions Act 1844 (repealed)	7 & 8 Vict. c. 71	6 August 1844
An Act for the better Administration of Criminal Justice in Middlesex. (Repealed by Middlesex Sessions Act 1874 (37 & 38 Vict. c. 7), Statute Law Revision Act 1891 (54 & 55 Vict. c. 67) and Statute Law Revision Act 1953 (2 & 3 Eliz. 2. c. 5))
New South Wales Act 1844 or the Customs (New South Wales) Act 1844 (repealed)	7 & 8 Vict. c. 72	6 August 1844
An Act to clear up Doubts as to the Regulation and Audit of the Accounts of the Customs in New South Wales. (Repealed by Statute Law Revision Act 1875 (38 & 39 Vict. c. 66))
Customs (Books and Engravings) Act 1844 (repealed)	7 & 8 Vict. c. 73	6 August 1844
An Act to reduce, under certain Circumstances, the Duties payable upon Books and Engravings. (Repealed by Customs (No. 2) Act 1846 (9 & 10 Vict. c. 58))
Australian Constitutions Act 1844 (repealed)	7 & 8 Vict. c. 74	6 August 1844
An Act to explain and amend the Act (Note: Australian Constitutions Act 1842 (5 & 6 Vict. c. 76)) for the Government of New South Wales and Van Diemen's Land. (Repealed by Statute Law Revision Act 1874 (No. 2) (37 & 38 Vict. c. 96))
Militia Pay Act 1844 (repealed)	7 & 8 Vict. c. 75	6 August 1844
An Act to defray until the First Day of August One thousand eight hundred and forty-five the Charge of the Pay, Clothing, and contingent and other Expences of the Disembodied Militia in Great Britain and Ireland; to grant Allowances in certain Cases to Subaltern Officers, Adjutants, Paymasters, Quartermasters, Surgeons, Assistant Surgeons, Surgeons Mates, and Serjeant Majors of the Militia; and to authorize the Employment of the Non-commissioned Officers. (Repealed by Statute Law Revision Act 1874 (No. 2) (37 & 38 Vict. c. 96))
Transfer of Property Act 1844 (repealed)	7 & 8 Vict. c. 76	6 August 1844
An Act to simplify the Transfer of Property. (Repealed by Real Property Act 1845 (8 & 9 Vict. c. 106))
Clerk of the Crown in Chancery Act 1844 (repealed)	7 & 8 Vict. c. 77	6 August 1844
An Act to amend so much of an Act of the Fifth and Sixth Years of His late Majesty (Note: Court of Chancery Act 1842 (5 & 6 Vict. c. 103)) as relates to the Salary of the Clerk of the Crown in Chancery; and to make other Provisions in respect of the said Office. (Repealed by Statute Law Revision Act 1874 (No. 2) (37 & 38 Vict. c. 96))
Unlawful Oaths (Ireland) Act 1844 or the Unlawful Oaths Continuance Act 1844 or the Unlawful Oaths Act 1844 (repealed)	7 & 8 Vict. c. 78	6 August 1844
An Act to continue for One Year an Act of the Second and Third Years of Her present Majesty, (Note: Unlawful Societies (Ireland) Act 1839 (2 & 3 Vict. c. 74)) intituled "An Act to extend and render more effectual for Five Years an Act passed in the Fourth Year of His late Majesty George the Fourth, (Note: Unlawful Oaths (Ireland) Act 1823 (4 Geo. 4. c. 87)) to amend an Act passed in the Fiftieth Year of His Majesty George the Third, (Note: Unlawful Oaths (Ireland) Act 1810 (50 Geo. 3. c. 102)) for preventing the administering and taking unlawful Oaths in Ireland." (Repealed by Statute Law Revision Act 1874 (No. 2) (37 & 38 Vict. c. 96))
Land Tax Commissions Act 1844 (repealed)	7 & 8 Vict. c. 79	6 August 1844
An Act to appoint additional Commissioners for executing the Acts for granting a Land Tax and other Rates and Taxes. (Repealed by Statute Law Revision Act 1950 (14 Geo. 6. c. 6))
South Sea Company Act 1844 (repealed)	7 & 8 Vict. c. 80	9 August 1844
An Act for completing the Guarantee Fund of the South Sea Company, for advancing for the Public Service Part of the unclaimed Stock and Dividends in the Hands of the said Company, and for regulating the Allowance to be paid for the Management of the South Sea Stock and Annuities. (Repealed by Statute Law Revision Act 1870 (33 & 34 Vict. c. 69))
Marriages (Ireland) Act 1844 or the Irish Marriage Act 1844	7 & 8 Vict. c. 81	9 August 1844
An Act for Marriages in Ireland; and for registering such Marriages.
Spirits (Ireland) Act 1844 (repealed)	7 & 8 Vict. c. 82	9 August 1844
An Act to continue for Five Years so much of an Act of the Second and Third Years of Her present Majesty, (Note: Sale of Spirits, etc. (Ireland) Act 1839 (2 & 3 Vict. c. 79)) as enables Justices to grant Warrants for entering Places in which Spirits are sold without Licence in Ireland. (Repealed by Statute Law Revision Act 1874 (No. 2) (37 & 38 Vict. c. 96))
Savings Bank Act 1844 (repealed)	7 & 8 Vict. c. 83	9 August 1844
An Act to amend the Laws relating to Savings Banks, and to the Purchase of Government Annuities through the Medium of Savings Banks. (Repealed by Post Office Savings Bank Act 1954 (2 & 3 Eliz. 2. c. 62))
Metropolitan Buildings Act 1844 (repealed)	7 & 8 Vict. c. 84	9 August 1844
An Act for regulating the Construction and the Use of Buildings in the Metropolis and its Neighbourhood. (Repealed by London County Council (General Powers) Act 1894 (57 & 58 Vict. c. ccxii))
Railway Regulation Act 1844 (repealed)	7 & 8 Vict. c. 85	9 August 1844
An Act to attach certain Conditions to the construction of future Railways authorised by any Act of the present or succeeding sessions of Parliament; and for other Purposes in relation to Railways. (Repealed by Transport Act 1962 (10 & 11 Eliz. 2. c. 46) and Road Traffic, Transport and Roads (Northern Ireland) Order 1984 (SI 1984/1986 (N.I. 15)))
Solicitors (Clerks) Act 1844 (repealed)	7 & 8 Vict. c. 86	9 August 1844
An Act for the Relief of Clerks to Attornies and Solicitors who have omitted to enrol their Contracts; and for amending the Law relating to the Enrolment of such Contracts, and to the Disabilities of such Clerks, in certain Cases. (Repealed by Statute Law Revision Act 1874 (No. 2) (37 & 38 Vict. c. 96) and Solicitors Act 1932 (22 & 23 Geo. 5. c. 37))
Knackers Act 1844 (repealed)	7 & 8 Vict. c. 87	9 August 1844
An Act to amend the Law for regulating Places kept for slaughtering Horses. (Repealed by Food and Drugs Act 1938 (1 & 2 Geo. 6. c. 56))
Piccadilly Improvement Act 1844	7 & 8 Vict. c. 88	9 August 1844
An Act to widen and improve Piccadilly in the City of Westminster.
Commissioners of Woods (Audit) Act 1844 (repealed)	7 & 8 Vict. c. 89	9 August 1844
An Act for auditing the Accounts of the Commissioners of Har Majesty's Woods, Forests, Land Revenues, Works, and Buildings. (Repealed by Crown Estate Act 1961 (9 & 10 Eliz. 2. c. 55))
Judgments (Ireland) Act 1844 (repealed)	7 & 8 Vict. c. 90	9 August 1844
An Act for the Protection of Purchasers against Judgments, Crown Debts, Lis Pendens, and Commissions of Bankruptcy; and for providing One Office for the registering of all Judgments in Ireland; and for amending the Laws in Ireland respecting Bankrupts and the Limitation of Actions. (Repealed by Judgments (Enforcement) Act (Northern Ireland) 1969 (c. 30 (N.I.)))
South Wales Turnpike Trusts Act 1844 or the Turnpikes (South Wales) Act 1844 or the Turnpike Trusts in South Wales Act 1844 or Lord Cawdor's Act (repealed)	7 & 8 Vict. c. 91	9 August 1844
An Act to consolidate and amend the Laws relating to Turnpike Trusts in South Wales. (Repealed by Statute Law (Repeals) Act 1993 (c. 50))
Coroners Act 1844 (repealed)	7 & 8 Vict. c. 92	9 August 1844
An Act to amend the Law respecting the Office of County Coroner. (Repealed by Coroners Act 1988 (c. 13))
Arbitrations Act 1844 or the Municipal Corporations Act 1844 (repealed)	7 & 8 Vict. c. 93	9 August 1844
An Act to enable Barristers appointed to arbitrate between Counties and Boroughs to submit a Special Case to the Superior Courts. (Repealed by Prison Act 1865 (28 & 29 Vict. c. 126))
New Parishes Act 1844 (repealed)	7 & 8 Vict. c. 94	9 August 1844
An Act to explain and amend an Act (Note: New Parishes Act 1843 (6 & 7 Vict. c. 37)) for making better Provision for the Spiritual Care of populous Parishes. (Repealed by Statute Law (Repeals) Act 1974 (c. 22))
Salmon Fisheries (Scotland) Act 1844 (repealed)	7 & 8 Vict. c. 95	9 August 1844
An Act to amend an Act of the Ninth Year of King George the Fourth, (Note: Salmon Fisheries (Scotland) Act 1828 (9 Geo. 4. c. 39)) for the Preservation of the Salmon Fisheries in Scotland. (Repealed by Salmon and Freshwater Fisheries (Protection) (Scotland) Act 1951 (14 & 15 Geo. 6. c. 26))
Execution Act 1844 (repealed)	7 & 8 Vict. c. 96	9 August 1844
An Act to amend the Law of Insolvency, Bankruptcy, and Execution. (Repealed by Tribunals, Courts and Enforcement Act 2007 (c. 15))
Charitable Donations and Bequests (Ireland) Act 1844 or the Charitable Bequests Act 1844 (repealed)	7 & 8 Vict. c. 97	9 August 1844
An Act for the more effectual Application of Charitable Donations and Bequests in Ireland. (Repealed by Charities Act (Northern Ireland) 1964 (c. 33 (N.I.)))
Grand Canal (Ireland) Act 1844	7 & 8 Vict. c. 98	9 August 1844
An Act to enable the Commissioners of Public Works in Ireland to accept a certain Sum of Money in satisfaction of their Mortgage on the Branch Canals communicating with the Grand Canal in Ireland.
Tralee Navigation and Harbour Act 1844	7 & 8 Vict. c. 99	9 August 1844
An Act to extend the Time limited by an Act passed in the Fourth and Fifth Years of Her present Majesty, (Note: Tralee Navigation Act 1841 (4 & 5 Vict. c. 46)) empowering the Commissioners for the Issue of Exchequer Bills for Public Works to complete the Works for improving the Navigation and Harbour of Tralee in the County of Kerry.
Arms (Ireland) Act 1844 (repealed)	7 & 8 Vict. c. 100	9 August 1844
An Act to supply an Omission in an Act of the Sixth and Seventh Years of Her present Majesty, (Note: Arms, etc. (Ireland) Act 1843 (6 & 7 Vict. c. 74)) for amending and continuing the Laws in Ireland relative to the registering of Arms, and the Importation, Manufacture, and Sale of Arms, Gunpowder, and Ammunition. (Repealed by Statute Law Revision Act 1874 (No. 2) (37 & 38 Vict. c. 96))
Poor Law Amendment Act 1844 (repealed)	7 & 8 Vict. c. 101	9 August 1844
An Act for the further Amendment of the Laws relating to the Poor in England. (Repealed by Statute Law (Repeals) Act 1974 (c. 22))
Roman Catholics Act 1844 or the Roman Catholic Penal Acts Repeal Act 1844 (repealed)	7 & 8 Vict. c. 102	9 August 1844
An Act to repeal certain Penal Enactments made against Her Majesty's Roman Catholic Subjects. (Repealed by Statute Law Revision Act 1874 (No. 2) (37 & 38 Vict. c. 96))
Controverted Elections Act 1844 (repealed)	7 & 8 Vict. c. 103	9 August 1844
An Act to amend the Law for the Trial of controverted Elections of Members to serve in Parliament. (Repealed by Election Petitions Act 1848 (11 & 12 Vict. c. 98))
Appropriation Act 1844 (repealed)	7 & 8 Vict. c. 104	9 August 1844
An Act to apply a Sum out of the Consolidated Fund and certain other Sums to the Service of the Year One thousand eight hundred and forty-four, and to appropriate the Supplies granted in this Session of Parliament. (Repealed by Statute Law Revision Act 1874 (No. 2) (37 & 38 Vict. c. 96))
Duchy of Cornwall (No. 2) Act 1844 or the Duchy of Cornwall (Limitation of Time) Act 1844 or the Duchy of Cornwall (Assessionable Manors) Act 1844	7 & 8 Vict. c. 105	9 August 1844
An Act to confirm and enfranchise the Estates of the Conventionary Tenants of the ancient Assessionable Manors of the Duchy of Cornwall, and to quiet Titles within the County of Cornwall as against the Duchy; and for other Purposes.
County Dublin Grand Jury Act 1844	7 & 8 Vict. c. 106	9 August 1844
An Act to consolidate and amend the Laws for the Regulation of Grand Jury Presentments in the County of Dublin.
Common Law Offices (Ireland) Act 1844 (repealed)	7 & 8 Vict. c. 107	5 September 1844
An Act to regulate and reduce the Expences of the Offices attached to the Superior Courts of Law in Ireland payable out of the Consolidated Fund. (Repealed by Judicature (Northern Ireland) Act 1978 (c. 23))
Fisheries (Ireland) Act 1844 (repealed)	7 & 8 Vict. c. 108	5 September 1844
An Act to amend an Act of the Sixth Year of Her present Majesty, intituled "An Act to regulate the Irish Fisheries;" (Note: Fisheries (Ireland) Act 1842 (5 & 6 Vict.. c. 106)) and to empower the Constabulary Force to enforce certain Provisions respecting the Irish Fisheries. (Repealed by Fisheries Act (Northern Ireland) 1966 (c. 17 (N.I.)))
Art Unions Indemnity Act 1844 (repealed)	7 & 8 Vict. c. 109	5 September 1844
An Act to indemnify Persons connected with Art Unions, and others, against certain Penalties. (Repealed by Statute Law Revision Act 1874 (No. 2) (37 & 38 Vict. c. 96))
Joint Stock Companies Act 1844 (repealed)	7 & 8 Vict. c. 110	5 September 1844
An Act for the Registration, Incorporation, and Regulation of Joint Stock Companies. (Repealed by Companies Act 1862 (25 & 26 Vict. c. 89))
Joint Stock Companies Winding-Up Act 1844 (repealed)	7 & 8 Vict. c. 111	5 September 1844
An Act for facilitating the winding up the Affairs of Joint Stock Companies unable to meet their pecuniary Engagements. (Repealed by Companies Act 1862 (25 & 26 Vict. c. 89))
Merchant Seamen Act 1844 or the Merchant Shipping Act 1844 (repealed)	7 & 8 Vict. c. 112	5 September 1844
An Act to amend and consolidate the Laws relating to Merchant Seamen; and for keeping a Register of Seamen. (Repealed by Merchant Shipping Repeal Act 1854 (17 & 18 Vict. c. 120))
Joint Stock Banks Act 1844 (repealed)	7 & 8 Vict. c. 113	5 September 1844
An Act to regulate Joint Stock Banks in England. (Repealed by Companies Act 1862 (25 & 26 Vict. c. 89) and Companies Act 1948 (11 & 12 Geo. 6. c. 38))

=== Local acts ===
Short title	Citation	Royal assent
Long title
Ribble Navigation Company Act 1844 (repealed)	7 & 8 Vict. c. i	2 April 1844
An Act to enable the Ribble Navigation Company to raise a further Sum of Money; and to enable the Owners of reclaimed Lands to pay a Sum in gross in lieu of the annual Rents. (Repealed by Ribble Navigation Act 1853 (16 & 17 Vict. c. clxx))
Bolton and Preston Railway Act 1844	7 & 8 Vict. c. ii	10 May 1844
An Act to effectuate the Sale by the Bolton and Preston Railway Company of their Railway and other Property and Effects to the North Union Railway Company; to incorporate with such last-mentioned Company the Proprietors of the Bolton and Preston Railway; and to consolidate Shares into Stock.
Great Western Railway Act 1844	7 & 8 Vict. c. iii	10 May 1844
An Act to amend the several Acts relating to the Great Western, the Cheltenham and Great Western Union, and Oxford Railways; to amalgamate the Two last-mentioned Railways with the Great Western Railway; and to authorize the Formation of additional Works at Cheltenham by the Great Western Railway Company.
Yarmouth and Norwich Railway Act 1844 (repealed)	7 & 8 Vict. c. iv	10 May 1844
An Act to amend and enlarge some of the Provisions of the Act (Note: Yarmouth and Norwich Railway Act 1842 (5 & 6 Vict. c. lxxxii)) authorizing the Construction of the Yarmouth and Norwich Railway, and to authorize the Construction of certain new Works in connexion therewith. (Repealed by Great Eastern Railway Act 1862 (25 & 26 Vict. c. ccxxiii))
Guildford Junction Railway Act 1844	7 & 8 Vict. c. v	10 May 1844
An Act for making a Railway from the London and South-western Railway to Guildford in the County of Surrey.
Edinburgh Charity Workhouse Act 1844 (repealed)	7 & 8 Vict. c. vi	10 May 1844
An Act for providing for the Liquidation of the Debt owing by the Charity Workhouse of the City of Edinburgh, for regulating the Assessment for Relief of the Poor of the said City, and for other Purposes relating thereto. (Repealed by Statute Law (Repeals) Act 1998 (c. 43))
Edinburgh Customs and Duties Act 1844	7 & 8 Vict. c. vii	10 May 1844
An Act to amend an Act passed in the Third Year of the Reign of Her present Majesty, (Note: Edinburgh Customs and Duties Act 1840 (3 & 4 Vict. c. xvii)) for abolishing certain Petty and Market Customs in the City of Edinburgh, and granting other Duties in lieu thereof.
Glossop Market Act 1844 (repealed)	7 & 8 Vict. c. viii	10 May 1844
An Act for establishing a Market in the Town of Glossop in the County of Derby. (Repealed by Ministry of Health Provisional Orders Confirmation (No. 3) Act 1921 (11 & 12 Geo. 5. c. xix))
River Waveney Navigation Act 1844	7 & 8 Vict. c. ix	10 May 1844
An Act to amend the Powers and Provisions of an Act of the First Tear of King William the Fourth, (Note: River Waveney Navigation Act 1831 (1 Will. 4. c. l)) for making the River Waveney navigable for Ships and other Seaborne Vessels from Rosehall Fleet to the Mouth of Oulton Dyke, and for making and maintaining a navigable Cut from the said River into the said Dyke.
Severn Navigation Act 1844	7 & 8 Vict. c. x	10 May 1844
An Act to alter and extend the Provisions of an Act (Note: Severn Navigation Act 1842 (5 & 6 Vict. c. xxiv)) for improving the Navigation of the River Severn.
Birmingham Canal Navigations Act 1844	7 & 8 Vict. c. xi	10 May 1844
An Act for enabling the Company of Proprietors of the Birmingham Canal Navigations to borrow a further Sum of Money; and to extend and alter some of the Provisions of their present Acts.
Rochdale Gas Act 1844	7 & 8 Vict. c. xii	10 May 1844
An Act for more effectually lighting with Gas the Borough and Parish of Rochdale in the County of Lancaster.
Liverpool Gas Act 1844 (repealed)	7 & 8 Vict. c. xiii	10 May 1844
An Act to amend and enlarge the Provisions of Two several Acts, (Note: Liverpool Gas Act 1823 (4 Geo. 4. c. xxxix)) (Note: Liverpool Oil Gaslight Company Act 1834 (4 & 5 Will. 4. c. i)) for lighting with Gas the Town of Liverpool and certain Places adjacent thereto. (Repealed by Liverpool United Gaslight Company's Act 1848 (11 & 12 Vict. c. xxxviii))
Durham County Coal Company Act 1844	7 & 8 Vict. c. xiv	10 May 1844
An Act for regulating legal Proceedings by or against the Durham County Coal Company, and for other Purposes.
Norwich and Brandon Railway Act 1844	7 & 8 Vict. c. xv	10 May 1844
An Act for making a Railway from Norwich to Brandon, with a Branch to Thetford.
Manchester and Leeds Railway Act 1844	7 & 8 Vict. c. xvi	10 May 1844
An Act for maintaining a Railway from the Manchester and Leeds Railway to Heywood; and for amending the Acts relating to the Manchester and Leeds Railway.
Manchester and Birmingham Railway (Macclesfield Branch) Act 1844 (repealed)	7 & 8 Vict. c. xvii	10 May 1844
An Act for enabling the Manchester and Birmingham Railway Company to vary the Line of their Branch Railway to Macclesfield, and to make another Branch therefrom; and for amending the former Acts relating to the said Company. (Repealed by London and North Western Railway Act 1846 (9 & 10 Vict. c. cciv))
Midland Railway Consolidation Act 1844 or the Midland Railway (Consolidation) Act 1844 (repealed)	7 & 8 Vict. c. xviii	10 May 1844
An Act to consolidate the North Midland, Midland Counties, and Birmingham and Derby Junction Railways. (Repealed by Midland Railway Act 1895 (58 & 59 Vict. c. cxxxiii))
Eastern Counties Railway and Eastern Counties Railway (Brandon and Peterborough Extension) Bill Rectification Act 1844 (repealed)	7 & 8 Vict. c. xix	23 May 1844
An Act to rectify a Mistake as to the Proceedings on the Eastern Counties Railway Bill and the Eastern Counties Railway (Brandon and Peterborough Extension) Bill. (Note: This act was passed to reverse an error in the granting of royal assent to the wrong bill.) (Repealed by Great Eastern Railway Act 1862 (25 & 26 Vict. c. ccxxiii))
Northern and Eastern Railway Act 1844	7 & 8 Vict. c. xx	23 May 1844
An Act to authorize the letting on Lease to the Eastern Counties Railway Company of the Railways and Works of the Northern and Eastern Railway Company, and to give effect to certain Arrangements entered into by the said Companies, and to amend and enlarge some of the Provisions of the Acts relating to the first-named Company.
Leeds and Selby Railway Act 1844	7 & 8 Vict. c. xxi	23 May 1844
An Act for vesting the Leeds and Selby Railway in the York and North Midland Railway Company, and for enabling that Company to raise a further Sum of Money to complete the Purchase of such Railway.
Furness Railway Act 1844 (repealed)	7 & 8 Vict. c. xxii	23 May 1844
An Act for making a Railway from Rampside and Barrow to Dalton, Lindale, and Kirkby Ireleth, in the County Palatine of Lancaster, to be called "The Furness Railway." (Repealed by Furness Railway Act 1855 (18 & 19 Vict. c. clxxiii))
Newquay (Cornwall) Pier and Harbour Act 1844	7 & 8 Vict. c. xxiii	23 May 1844
An Act to amend an Act for maintaining the Pier and Harbour of Newquay in the County of Cornwall, and to make certain Tram Roads in connexion therewith.
Port of Padstow and River Camel Improvement Act 1844	7 & 8 Vict. c. xxiv	23 May 1844
An Act for regulating, maintaining, and improving the Port of Padstow in the County of Cornwall, and the navigable Parts of the River Camel or Allen in the same County.
South Eastern Railway (Ashford to Canterbury, Ramsgate and Margate Branch) Act 1844	7 & 8 Vict. c. xxv	23 May 1844
An Act to enable the South-eastern Railway Company to make a Railway from the said South-eastern Railway near Ashford to the City of Canterbury and the Towns of Ramsgate and Margate, and to join the Canterbury and Whitstable Railway.
Pontop and South Shields Railway Act 1844	7 & 8 Vict. c. xxvi	23 May 1844
An Act for enabling the Pontop and South Shields Railway Company to widen a Part of their Railway, and to make a Branch therefrom; and for other Purposes.
Durham Junction Railway Act 1844	7 & 8 Vict. c. xxvii	23 May 1844
An Act for authorizing the Sale of the Durham Junction Railway to the Newcastle and Darlington Junction Railway Company; and for enabling the said Company to make a Station at Gateshead, with a Bridge and Approaches to connect the said last-mentioned Railway with the Town of Newcastle-upon-Tyne; and for other Purposes.
Hartlepool West Harbour and Dock Act 1844 (repealed)	7 & 8 Vict. c. xxviii	23 May 1844
An Act for making a Harbour and Dock near to Hartlepool in the County of Durham. (Repealed by West Hartlepool Harbour and Railway Act 1852 (15 & 16 Vict. c. cxlii))
Thetford Inclosure and Drainage Act 1844	7 & 8 Vict. c. xxix	23 May 1844
An Act for dividing, allotting, and inclosing Lands in the Hamlet of Thetford in the Parish of Streatham in the Isle of Ely and County of Cambridge; and for draining and embanking certain Parts of the said Lands, and other Lands in the said Hamlet, and in other Parishes in the said Isle and County.
New British Iron Company Act 1844	7 & 8 Vict. c. xxx	23 May 1844
An Act for granting certain Powers to "The New British Iron Company."
Northern Coal Mining Company Act 1844	7 & 8 Vict. c. xxxi	23 May 1844
An Act for enabling the Northern Coal Mining Company to raise Money for paying off existing Debts of the Company.
Birkenhead Improvement Act 1844 (repealed)	7 & 8 Vict. c. xxxii	6 June 1844
An Act to authorize the Purchase of "Monk's Ferry" by the Commissioners for the Improvement of Birkenhead, Claughto-cum-Grange, and Part of Oxton, in the County of Chester, and for amending the Acts relating to the said Commissioners. (Repealed by Birkenhead Corporation Act 1881 (44 & 45 Vict. c. cliii))
Salford Improvement Act 1844 (repealed)	7 & 8 Vict. c. xxxiii	6 June 1844
An Act for opening certain Streets and otherwise improving the Town of Salford; and for amending an Act passed in the Eleventh Year of the Reign of His Majesty King George the Fourth, (Note: Salford Improvement Act 1830 (11 Geo. 4. & 1 Will. 4. c. viii)) for better cleansing and improving the said Town of Salford in the County Palatine of Lancaster. (Repealed by Salford Improvement Act 1862 (25 & 26 Vict. c. ccv))
Blackburn and Preston Railway Act 1844	7 & 8 Vict. c. xxxiv	6 June 1844
An Act for making a Railway from the Town of Blackburn to the North Union Railway in the Township of Farringtom near Preston, all in the County of Lancaster,
Northern and Eastern Railway (Deviation and Amendment) Act 1844	7 & 8 Vict. c. xxxv	6 June 1844
An Act to enable the Northern and Eastern Railway Company to make certain Deviations in the Line of their Railway between Bishops-Stortford and Newport; and to alter and amend the Acts relating to the said Railway.
Maryport and Carlisle Railway Act 1844 (repealed)	7 & 8 Vict. c. xxxvi	6 June 1844
An Act to amend the Acts relating to the Maryport and Carlisle Railway, and for making certain Extensions and Branches connected therewith. (Repealed by Maryport and Carlisle Railway Act 1855 (18 & 19 Vict. c. lxxix))
Lancaster and Carlisle Railway Act 1844	7 & 8 Vict. c. xxxvii	6 June 1844
An Act for making a Railway from the Lancaster and Preston Junction Railway at Lancaster to or near to the City of Carlisle.
Leeds New Gas Company Act 1844 (repealed)	7 & 8 Vict. c. xxxviii	6 June 1844
An Act for extending and amending some of the Powers and Provisions of the Act (Note: Leeds Gas Act 1835 (5 & 6 Will. 4. c. lxxxvi)) relating to "The Leeds New Gas Company." (Repealed by Leeds New Gas Company Act 1854 (17 & 18 Vict. c. iv))
Globe Insurance Company Act 1844	7 & 8 Vict. c. xxxix	6 June 1844
An Act to enable the Globe Insurance Company to alt& and amend some of the Provisions of their Deed of Settlement.
Manchester Good Government and Police Act 1844	7 & 8 Vict. c. xl	4 July 1844
An Act for the good Government and Police Regulation of the Borough of Manchester.
Manchester Improvement Act 1844	7 & 8 Vict. c. xli	4 July 1844
An Act for the Improvement of the Town of Manchester.
Lakenheath and Brandon Drainage Act 1844	7 & 8 Vict. c. xlii	4 July 1844
An Act for amending and rendering more effectual an Act (Note: Lakenheath and Brandon Drainage Act 1768 (8 Geo. 3. c. 47 Pr.)) for draining and preserving certain Fen Lands and Low Grounds in the Parishes of Lakenheath and Brandon in the County of Suffolk.
Manchester Royal Infirmary Act 1844	7 & 8 Vict. c. xliii	4 July 1844
An Act to enable the President, Treasurers, Deputy Treasurers, Benefactors and Subscribers, of and to the Manchester Royal Infirmary, Dispensary, and Lunatic Hospital or Asylum to enlarge the said Infirmary, and to purchase and hold Land for the Erection of a new Lunatic Hospital or Asylum.
Swansea Harbour Acts Amendment Act 1844 (repealed)	7 & 8 Vict. c. xliv	4 July 1844
An Act to amend an Act (Note: Swansea Harbour Act 1836 (6 & 7 Will. 4. c. cxxvi)) for altering and amending several Acts for the Improvement of the Harbour of Swansea in the County of Glamorgan. (Repealed by Swansea Harbour Act 1854 (17 & 18 Vict. c. cxxvi))
Sheffield United Gas Light Company Act 1844 (repealed)	7 & 8 Vict. c. xlv	4 July 1844
An Act for uniting the Sheffield Gas Light Companies. (Repealed by Sheffield Gas Act 1855 (18 & 19 Vict. c. xiv))
British Iron Company (Winding Up) Act 1844	7 & 8 Vict. c. xlvi	4 July 1844
An Act to facilitate the Settlement of the Affairs of the British Iron Company.
Cwm Celyn and Blaina Iron Company (Winding Up) Act 1844	7 & 8 Vict. c. xlvii	4 July 1844
An Act to enlarge the Powers granted by an Act passed in the Second Session of the Fifth Year of Her present Majesty, intituled "An Act for regulating legal Proceedings by or against the Cwm Celyn and Blaina Iron Company, and for granting certain Powers thereto." (Note: Cwm Celyn and Blaina Iron Company Act 1842 (5 & 6 Vict. c. xxxix))
European Life Insurance and Annuity Company Act 1844	7 & 8 Vict. c. xlviii	4 July 1844
An Act for regulating legal Proceedings by or against "The European Life Insurance and Annuity Company," and for granting certain Powers thereto.
Sidmouth and Collumpton Turnpike Act 1844	7 & 8 Vict. c. xlix	4 July 1844
An Act for making and maintaining a Turnpike Road from Sidmouth to Collumpton, and also to or near to Hele Mill in the Parish of Bradninch, all in the County of Devon.
Kent and Sussex Drainage Act 1844	7 & 8 Vict. c. l	4 July 1844
An Act to amend Three Acts (Note: Kent and Sussex Marsh Lands Drainage Act 1826 (7 Geo. 4. c. cxxii)) (Note: Kent and Sussex Drainage Act 1830 (11 Geo. 4 & 1 Will. 4. c. cxxxvi)) (Note: River Rother and Channel of Appledore Drainage Act 1833 (3 & 4 Will. 4. c. xxix)) for more effectually draining and preserving certain Marsh Lands or Low Grounds in the Counties of Kent and Sussex draining into the River Rother and Channel of Appledore.
Liverpool Fire Protection Act 1844 (repealed)	7 & 8 Vict. c. li	4 July 1844
An Act to alter and amend an Act of the Sixth and Seventh Years of the Reign of Her present Majesty, (Note: Liverpool Fire Protection Act 1843 (6 & 7 Vict. c. cix)) for the better Protection of Property in the Borough of Liverpool from Fire. (Repealed by Merseyside Act 1980 (c. x))
British Society for Extending the Fisheries and Improving the Sea Coasts of the Kingdom Act 1844	7 & 8 Vict. c. lii	4 July 1844
An Act to explain and amend the Acts incorporating the British Society for extending the Fisheries and improving the Sea Coasts of the Kingdom; for enlarging and improving the Harbour of Pulteney Town in the County of Caithness; and for lighting, cleansing, and improving the said Town, and better supplying the same with Water.
Canterbury Improvement Act 1844	7 & 8 Vict. c. liii	4 July 1844
An Act for amending certain Acts for paving, cleansing, and lighting the Streets and other public Passages and Places within the City and Borough of Canterbury.
Southampton Marsh Act 1844 or the Southampton Marsh Improvement Act 1844	7 & 8 Vict. c. liv	4 July 1844
An Act for improving the Marsh and other Common Lands, and extending Rights of Common and of Recreation, within the Town and County of the Town of Southampton.
Preston and Wyre Railway, Harbour and Dock Act 1844	7 & 8 Vict. c. lv	4 July 1844
An Act to amend the several Acts relating to the Preston and Wyre Railway, Harbour, and Dock Company.
Coventry Water Supply Act 1844 (repealed)	7 & 8 Vict. c. lvi	4 July 1844
An Act for better supplying with Water the Parishes of Saint Michael, the Holy Trinity, and Saint John the Baptist, in the City of Coventry and County of Warwick. (Repealed by Coventry Water Order 1958 (SI 1958/554))
Nottingham Improvement Act 1844 (repealed)	7 & 8 Vict. c. lvii	4 July 1844
An Act for amending the Provisions of an Act (Note: West Croft Canal Act 1839 (2 & 3 Vict. c. lxvi)) for forming a Canal and other Works within and near certain Lands called the West Croft, in the Parish of Saint Mary in the Town and County of the Town of Nottingham; and for making certain Improvements within the said Town. (Repealed by Statute Law (Repeals) Act 1995 (c. 44))
Edinburgh and Glasgow Railway Act 1844 (repealed)	7 & 8 Vict. c. lviii	4 July 1844
An Act to authorize an Extension of the Edinburgh and Glasgow Railway, and to amend and enlarge the Provisions of the Acts relating to such Railway. (Repealed by London and North Eastern Railway Order Confirmation Act 1933 (23 & 24 Geo. 5. c. lvi))
Leeds and Bradford Railway Act 1844	7 & 8 Vict. c. lix	4 July 1844
An Act for making a Railway from Leeds to Bradford, with a Branch to the North Midland Railway.
East Lancashire Railway Act 1844 or the Manchester, Bury, and Rossendale Railway Act 1844	7 & 8 Vict. c. lx	4 July 1844
An Act for making a Railway from the Manchester and Bolton Railway in the Parish of Eccles to the Parish of Whalley, all in the County Palatine of Lancaster, to be called The Manchester, Bury, and Rossendale Railway.
York and North Midland Railway (York and Scarborough) Act 1844	7 & 8 Vict. c. lxi	4 July 1844
An Act for enabling the York and North Midland Railway Company to make a Railway from York to Scarborough, with a Branch to Pickering.
Eastern Counties Railway Company (Ely, Brandon and Peterborough Extension) Act 1844	7 & 8 Vict. c. lxii	4 July 1844
An Act to enable the Eastern Counties Railway Company to make a Railway from the Northern and Eastern Railway at Newport, by Cambridge to Ely, and from thence Eastward to Brandon, and Westward to Peterborough.
Salisbury Branch Railway Act 1844	7 & 8 Vict. c. lxiii	4 July 1844
An Act to make a Branch Railway from the London and South-western Railway to Salisbury.
Whitehaven Junction Railway Act 1844	7 & 8 Vict. c. lxiv	4 July 1844
An Act for making a Railway from the Town and Port of Whitehaven to the Town and Port of Maryport in the County of Cumberland.
Chester and Holyhead Railway Act 1844	7 & 8 Vict. c. lxv	4 July 1844
An Act for making a Railway from Chester to Holyhead.
North British Railway Act 1844	7 & 8 Vict. c. lxvi	4 July 1844
An Act for making a Railway from the City of Edinburgh to the Town of Berwick-upon-Tweed, with a Branch to the Town of Haddington.
Brighton and Chichester Railway Act 1844	7 & 8 Vict. c. lxvii	4 July 1844
An Act for making a Railway from the Shoreham Branch of the London and Brighton Railway to Chichester.
South Devon Railway Act 1844	7 & 8 Vict. c. lxviii	4 July 1844
An Act for making a Railway from Exeter to Plymouth, to be called "The South Devon Railway."
South Eastern Railway Act 1844	7 & 8 Vict. c. lxix	4 July 1844
An Act to enable the South-Eastern Railway Company to complete and maintain a Branch Railway and Approach to the Harbour of Folkestone, and to construct other Works in connexion with the said Harbour, and also to effect certain Alterations and Extensions of the Works of the Maidstone Branch of the said South-eastern Railway; and to amend the Acts relating to the said Company.
Slamannan Junction Railway Act 1844 (repealed)	7 & 8 Vict. c. lxx	4 July 1844
An Act for making a Railway to connect the Edinburgh and Glasgow and Slamannan Railways. (Repealed by Edinburgh and Glasgow Railway Consolidation Act 1852 (15 & 16 Vict. c. cix))
Eastern Counties and Thames Junction Railway Act 1844 (repealed)	7 & 8 Vict. c. lxxi	4 July 1844
An Act for making a Junction Railway from the Eastern Counties Railway at Stratford in the County of Essex to the River Thames, with a Branch Railway therefrom; and for constructing a Pier in the River Thames. (Repealed by Great Eastern Railway Act 1862 (25 & 26 Vict. c. ccxxiii))
Holmfirth District Roads Act 1844	7 & 8 Vict. c. lxxii	19 July 1844
An Act for repairing, maintaining, and improving the Road from Flint Lane to Holmfrith, and thence to the Huddersfield and Woodhead Turnpike Road, and for making and maintaining a new Line of Road from the said Road at a Place called Bents to or near Dunford Bridge, all in the West Riding of the County of York.
Market Harborough and Coventry Road Act 1844	7 & 8 Vict. c. lxxiii	19 July 1844
An Act for more effectually repairing the Road from Market Harborough in the County of Leicester to the City of Coventry.
York Gas Act 1844 (repealed)	7 & 8 Vict. c. lxxiv	19 July 1844
An Act for uniting the York Gas Light Company and the York Union Gas Light Company, and for more effectually lighting with Gas the City of York and the Suburbs and Vicinity thereof, in the County of York. (Repealed by York Gas (Consolidation) Act 1912 (2 & 3 Geo. 5. c. lxxi))
Southampton Improvement Act 1844	7 & 8 Vict. c. lxxv	19 July 1844
An Act for paving, lighting, draining, cleansing, and otherwise improving the Town of Southampton, and for removing and preventing Nuisances and Annoyances therein.
Coventry Improvement Act 1844 (repealed)	7 & 8 Vict. c. lxxvi	19 July 1844
An Act for enabling the Mayor, Aldermen, and Burgesses of the City of Coventry to make certain Improvements, to provide a Residence for the Judges during the Assizes in the said City, and to establish a Cemetery for the Dead near the said City. (Repealed by West Midlands County Council Act 1980 (c. xi))
Hythe Pier (Fawley) Act 1844	7 & 8 Vict. c. lxxvii	19 July 1844
An Act for making a Landing Place at or near Hythe in the Parish of Fawley and extra-parochial Places adjoining thereto in the County of Southampton.
Newport Dock Company Act 1844	7 & 8 Vict. c. lxxviii	19 July 1844
An Act for authorizing the Newport Dock Company to raise further Monies, and to make Sale of the Docks and Works; and for amending certain Acts relating to the said Dock.
Birkenhead Docks Act 1844 (repealed)	7 & 8 Vict. c. lxxix	19 July 1844
An Act for constructing Tidal Basins, a Dock, and other Works at Birkenhead in the County of Chester; and for other Purposes. (Repealed by Mersey Dock Acts Consolidation Act 1858 (21 & 22 Vict. c. xcii))
Liverpool Docks Act 1844 (repealed)	7 & 8 Vict. c. lxxx	19 July 1844
An Act for enabling the Trustees of the Liverpool Docks to construct additional Wet Docks and other Works, and to raise a further Sum of Money; and for amending and extending the Acts relating to the Docks and Harbour of Liverpool. (Repealed by Mersey Dock Acts Consolidation Act 1858 (21 & 22 Vict. c. xcii))
Edinburgh, Leith and Granton Railway Act 1844	7 & 8 Vict. c. lxxxi	19 July 1844
An Act to alter, explain, revive, and continue the Powers and Provisions of the Acts relating to the Edinburgh, Leith, and Newhaven Railway, and to make Two Branch Railways therefrom.
Ashton, Stalybridge and Liverpool Junction Railway Act 1844	7 & 8 Vict. c. lxxxii	19 July 1844
An Act for making a Railway from the Manchester and Leeds Railway to the Towns of Ashton-under-Lyne and Staly Bridge.
Sheffield, Ashton-under-Lyne and Manchester Railway (Ashton-under-Lyne and Stalybridge Branch) Act 1844 (repealed)	7 & 8 Vict. c. lxxxiii	19 July 1844
An Act to enable the Sheffield, Ashton-under-Lyne, and Manchester Railway Company to make a Branch Railway to Ashton-under-Lyne and Stalybridge; and to alter and enlarge the Powers of the said Company. (Repealed by Manchester, Sheffield and Lincolnshire Railway Act 1849 (12 & 13 Vict. c. lxxxi))
Taff Vale Railway Act 1844	7 & 8 Vict. c. lxxxiv	19 July 1844
An Act to amend the Acts relating to the Taff Vale Railway; to authorize the Alteration of certain Works thereby authorized, and the Formation of additional Works; and to enlarge the Powers of the Company.
Eastern Union Railway Act 1844 (repealed)	7 & 8 Vict. c. lxxxv	19 July 1844
An Act for making a Railway from Colchester to Ipswich. (Repealed by Great Eastern Railway Act 1862 (25 & 26 Vict. c. ccxxiii))
London and South Western Railway Act 1844	7 & 8 Vict. c. lxxxvi	19 July 1844
An Act to amend the Acts relating to the London and South-western Railway, and to authorize an Extension of the said Railway and other Works at or near the Nine Elms Station.
Garnkirk and Glasgow Railway Act 1844	7 & 8 Vict. c. lxxxvii	19 July 1844
An Act to extend the Line of the Garnkirk and Glasgow Railway; to enable the Company to raise a further Sum of Money; and to alter and amend the Acts relating to the said Railway.
Delabole and Rock Railway Act 1844	7 & 8 Vict. c. lxxxviii	19 July 1844
An Act for making a Railway from Mellorn in the Parish of Minster to Black Rock in the Parish of Saint Michæl in Saint Minver Lowlands in the County of Cornwall.
Commutation of Tithes (Necton) Act 1844	7 & 8 Vict. c. lxxxix	19 July 1844
An Act to remedy certain Defects in the Apportionment of the Rent-charge in lieu of Tithes in the Parish of Necton in the County of Norfolk.
Gaspé Fishery and Coal Mining Company Act 1844	7 & 8 Vict. c. xc	29 July 1844
An Act to confirm and extend the Provisions of an Act (Note: 7 Vict. c. 45 (Canada)) of the Provincial Parliament of Canada, passed in the Seventh Year of the Reign of Her present Majesty, for incorporating the Gaspé Fishery and Coal Mining Company.
Brighton, Lewes and Hastings Railway Act 1844	7 & 8 Vict. c. xci	29 July 1844
An Act for making a Railway from the London and Brighton Railway to Lewes and Hastings, with a Branch therefrom, all in the County of Sussex.
Croydon and Epsom Railway Act 1844	7 & 8 Vict. c. xcii	29 July 1844
An Act for making a Railway from the London and Croydon Railway at Croydon to Epsom.
Wells Harbour and Quay Act 1844	7 & 8 Vict. c. xciii	29 July 1844
An Act for improving the Harbour and Quay of Wells in the County of Norfolk; and for extending and altering some of the Provisions of the Act (Note: Wells Harbour and Quay Act 1835 (5 & 6 Will. 4. c. xlviii)) relating to the said Harbour and Quay.
Wells (Norfolk) Improvement Act 1844	7 & 8 Vict. c. xciv	29 July 1844
An Act for lighting, paving, cleansing, widening, and improving the Streets of the Town or Parish of Wells in the County of Norfolk; for removing and preventing Nuisances therein; and for making new Streets or Roadways.
London Gaslight Company Act 1844 (repealed)	7 & 8 Vict. c. xcv	29 July 1844
An Act for incorporating the London Gas Light Company. (Repealed by London Gaslight Act 1852 (15 & 16 Vict. c. lxxxii))
Marine and General Life Assurance Company Act 1844	7 & 8 Vict. c. xcvi	29 July 1844
An Act for regulating legal Proceedings by or against the Mariners and General Life Assurance Company, and for granting certain Powers to the said Company.
London and Croydon Railway Act 1844	7 & 8 Vict. c. xcvii	6 August 1844
An Act to continue and extend the Powers of "The London and Croydon Railway Company."
Wishaw and Coltness Railway Act 1844	7 & 8 Vict. c. xcviii	6 August 1844
An Act to alter, amend, enlarge, and in part repeal the Acts relating to the Wishaw and Coltness Railway.
North Wales Mineral Railway Act 1844	7 & 8 Vict. c. xcix	6 August 1844
An Act for making a Railway from the River Dee in the County of the City of Chester to Wrexham in the County of Denbigh, to be called "The North Wales Mineral Railway."
Great Southern and Western Railway (Ireland) Act 1844	7 & 8 Vict. c. c	6 August 1844
An Act for making and maintaining a Railway from the City of Dublin to the Town of Cashel, with a Branch to the Town of Carlow.
Ayr Bridge Act 1844	7 & 8 Vict. c. ci	6 August 1844
An Act for widening, repairing, and maintaining the Bridge of Ayr, commonly called the New Bridge, leading across the River of Ayr at the Royal Burgh or Town of Ayr in the County of Ayr; and for other Purposes in relation thereto.
Swansea Improvement Act 1844	7 & 8 Vict. c. cii	6 August 1844
An Act for passing, lighting, cleansing, watering, regulating, and otherwise improving the Town and Borough of Swansea in the County of Glamorgan, and for removing and preventing Nuisances and Annoyances therein.
Kingston-upon-Hull Dock Act 1844	7 & 8 Vict. c. ciii	6 August 1844
An Act for making new Docks, and other Works connected therewith, in addition to the present Docks at Kingston-upon-Hull; and for amending the Acts relating to such last-mentioned Docks.
Rochdale Improvement Act 1844 (repealed)	7 & 8 Vict. c. civ	6 August 1844
An Act for better lighting, paving, cleansing, watching, regulating and improving the Town of Rochdale, and the Environs thereof in the County Palatine of Lancaster. (Repealed by Rochdale Improvement Act 1853 (16 & 17 Vict. c. ccxx))
Ventnor Improvement Act 1844	7 & 8 Vict. c. cv	6 August 1844
An Act lor better paving, lighting, cleansing, and otherwise improving Part of the Parish of Newchurch in the Isle of Wight, called Ventnor, and for establishing a Market therein.
Middle Level Drainage and Navigation Act 1844	7 & 8 Vict. c. cvi	9 August 1844
An Act for improving the Drainage and Navigation of the Middle Level of the Fens.
Paisley General Gas Act 1844 (repealed)	7 & 8 Vict. c. cvii	9 August 1844
An Act for the better supplying and lighting with Gas or other illuminating Power Parts of the Abbey Parish of Paisley, and certain Towns or Villages and Places adjacent; and for other Purposes relating thereto. (Repealed by Paisley Gaslight Act 1845 (8 & 9 Vict. c. xviii))
Leeds Vicarage Act 1844	7 & 8 Vict. c. cviii	9 August 1844
An Act to authorise the Division of the Parish and Vicarage of Leeds in the County of York into several Parishes and Vicarages.

=== Private acts ===
Short title	Citation	Royal assent
Long title
Bury Inclosure Act 1844	7 & 8 Vict. c. 1 Pr.	2 April 1844
An Act for inclosing Lands in the Parish of Bury in the County of Huntingdon.
Ramsey Inclosure Act 1844	7 & 8 Vict. c. 2 Pr.	2 April 1844
An Act for inclosing Lands in the Parish of Ramsey in the County of Huntingdon.
Bow Brickhill Estate Act 1844	7 & 8 Vict. c. 3 Pr.	10 May 1844
An Act to enable the Rector, Churchwardens, and Overseers of the Poor of the Parish of Bow Brickhill in the County of Buckingham to sell certain Parcels of Land in the said Parish which were allotted to them under the Award of the Commissioners made in pursuance of the Bow Brickhill and Fenny Stratford Inclosure Act, (Note: Bowbrickhill and Fenny Stratford Inclosure Act 1790 (30 Geo. 3. c. 40 Pr.)) passed in the Thirtieth Year of King George the Third.
Brandes Burton Inclosure Act 1844	7 & 8 Vict. c. 4 Pr.	10 May 1844
An Act for inclosing Lands in the Parish of Brandes Burton in the County of York.
Haltwhistle Inclosure Act 1844	7 & 8 Vict. c. 5 Pr.	6 June 1844
An Act for inclosing Lands in the Township of Haltwhistle in the Parish of Haltwhistle in the County of Northumberland.
Farrington and Cwmgilla Inclosure Act 1844	7 & 8 Vict. c. 6 Pr.	6 June 1844
An Act for inclosing Lands in the Manors or Lordships of Farrington and Cwmgilla in the Parish of Knighton in the County of Radnor.
Nottingham Inclosure Act 1844 (repealed)	7 & 8 Vict. c. 7 Pr.	4 July 1844
An Act for altering and amending an Act passed in the Third Year of the Reign of Her present Majesty, (Note: Westcroft Inclosure Act 1839 (2 & 3 Vict. c. 28 Pr.)) for inclosing certain Lands in the Town and County of the Town of Nottingham. (Repealed by Statute Law (Repeals) Act 1995 (c. 44))
Bleddfa and Llangunllo Inclosure Act 1844	7 & 8 Vict. c. 8 Pr.	4 July 1844
An Act for inclosing Lands in the Parishes of Bleddfa and Llangunllo in the County of Radnor.
Edwards's Estate Act 1844	7 & 8 Vict. c. 9 Pr.	4 July 1844
An Act for enabling George Edwards and Walter Colbourn, the Committees of the Estate of William Beckett Neachell, a Person of unsound Mind, to make Conveyances for carrying into execution an Agreement for the Partition or Division of the Real Estates of William Orme deceased, pursuant to an Order of the High Court of Chancery.
Campbell's Estate Act 1844	7 & 8 Vict. c. 10 Pr.	4 July 1844
An Act for authorizing a new Entail to be made of those Parts of the Lands and Estate of Blythswood which lie in the County of Lanark, and for enabling Archibald Campbell Esquire, of Blythswood, the Heir in possession of the said Estate, and his Successors, with Consent of Trustees, to sell or grant Fees of certain Parts thereof; and for other Purposes therein expressed.
Marquess of Ailsa's Estate Act 1844	7 & 8 Vict. c. 11 Pr.	4 July 1844
An Act to enable Archibald Marquess of Ailsa to borrow a certain Sum of Money upon the Security of his entailed Estates of Cassilis (Note: Cassillis House, near Maybole.) and Culzean, (Note: Culzean Castle.) for Repayment to him of a Portion of the Monies laid out by him in the Improvement of these Estates.
Rigby's Estate Act 1844	7 & 8 Vict. c. 12 Pr.	4 July 1844
An Act to authorize the Sale of the Fee Simple of the Estates of Francis Hale Rigby of Mistley in the County of Essex, Esquire, deceased, as devised by his will, and for laying out the Monies to arise by such Sale.
Irvine's Estate Act 1844	7 & 8 Vict. c. 13 Pr.	19 July 1844
An Act for selling the entailed Estate of Schivas in the County of Aberdeen, (Note: House of Schivas.) belonging to Alexander Forbes Irvine Esquire, and for investing the Price thereof in the Purchase of other Lands, to be entailed in lieu of the said Estate.
Stone's Estate Act 1844	7 & 8 Vict. c. 14 Pr.	19 July 1844
An Act for carrying into effect a Contract between Edward Gresley Stone and Thomas Fulljames Esquires for the Sale to the said Thomas Fulljames of an Estate in the Parishes of Hasfield, Ashleworth, and Corse, in the County of Gloucester, Part of the Estates devised by the Will of John Stone Esquire, deceased, and for investing the Purchase Money in other Estates, to be settled to the same Uses; and for vesting certain other detached Estates in the Counties of Gloucester and Worcester, devised by the same Will, in Trustees, for Sale, and for investing the Monies arising therefrom in the Purchase of more convenient Estates, to be settled to the same Uses.
Earl of Guilford's Estate Act 1844	7 & 8 Vict. c. 15 Pr.	19 July 1844
An Act to authorize the Sale of a certain Leasehold Estate in the County of Kent, Part of the settled Estate of the Earl of Guilford.
Mackenzie's (Scatwell) Estate Act 1844	7 & 8 Vict. c. 16 Pr.	29 July 1844
An Act to enable Sir James John Randoll Mackenzie of Scatwell, Baronet, to add certain Lands and Estates belonging to him in Fee Simple to his entailed Estate, upon certain Terms and Conditions, and to borrow certain Sums of Money upon the Security of his entailed Estate, for Repayment of certain Claims for Money laid out and to be laid out in Improvements upon the said Estate.
Mackenzie's (Seaforth) Estate Act 1844	7 & 8 Vict. c. 17 Pr.	29 July 1844
An Act for vesting in Trustees certain Parts of the entailed Estate of Seaforth, to be sold, and the Price applied in Payment of the Entailer's Debts, and the Surplus to be laid out in the Purchase of other Lands; for enabling the Heiress in possession to borrow a Sum of Money on the Credit of the said entailed Estates; and for other Purposes connected therewith.
Morton's Estate Act 1844	7 & 8 Vict. c. 18 Pr.	6 August 1844
An Act for authorizing the Sale of certain Estates in the Counties of Meath and Cavan, limited by the Settlement executed on the Marriage of Pierce Morton and Louisa Morton otherwise Somerville, his Wife, and for applying the Monies thence arising in Payment of Incumbrances affecting the said Estates prior to said Settlement.
Willenhall Chapel Estate Act 1844	7 & 8 Vict. c. 19 Pr.	6 August 1844
An Act to authorise the Sale of certain Estates and Mines belonging to the Chapel of Willenhall in the Parish of Wolverhampton in the County of Stafford; and to provide a Residence for the Incumbent of the Chapel.
Hitchen's (or Peach's) Estate Act 1844	7 & 8 Vict. c. 20 Pr.	6 August 1844
An Act to enable the Guardian of Henry Peach Keighley Peach an Infant, to sell the next Presentation to the Rectory and Parish Church of Idlicote in the County of Warwick.
Ramsden's Estate Act 1844 (repealed)	7 & 8 Vict. c. 21 Pr.	6 August 1844
An Act for enlarging the Powers contained in the Will of Sir John Ramsden Baronet, deceased, to grant Leases of the Hereditaments in the Townships of Huddersfield, Honley, Dalton, and Aldmondbury, devised by such Will; and for other Purposes. (Repealed by West Yorkshire Act 1980 (c. xiv))
Passingham's Estate Act 1844	7 & 8 Vict. c. 22 Pr.	6 August 1844
An Act for enabling the Trustees under the Will of the late Mr. Jonathan Passingham to grant Leases of the devised Estates, with Licences to dig Brick Earth; and to raise Monies upon Parts of the said Estates; and for the Purchase of an adjoining Property; and for other Purposes.
Wilson's Estate Act 1844	7 & 8 Vict. c. 23 Pr.	6 August 1844
An Act for enabling the Trustees under the Marriage Settlement of William Henry Bowen Jordan Wilson Esquire to sell the Estates comprised in the same Settlement, and for laying out the Monies arising from such Sales in the Purchase of other Lands, to be settled to the same Uses.
Harris's Estate Act 1844	7 & 8 Vict. c. 24 Pr.	6 August 1844
An Act for enabling Trustees to sell the Estates devised by and settled to the Uses of the Will of William Harris Esquire, deceased, and for authorizing the laying out of the Monies arising therefrom in the Purchase of other Estates, to be settled to the same Uses.
Lady le Despencer's Estate Act 1844	7 & 8 Vict. c. 25 Pr.	6 August 1844
An Act for carrying into effect a Compromise of a Suit for raising Portions for the younger Children of the Right Honourable Thomas Lord Le Despencer deceased, out of the settled Estates of the said Thomas Lord Le Despencer deceased at Mereworth in the County of Kent and elsewhere in the said County; and also for authorizing the Sale and Exchange of certain Parts of the said settled Estates.
Lord Lovat's Estate Act 1844	7 & 8 Vict. c. 26 Pr.	6 August 1844
An Act to enable Thomas Alexander Baron Lovat to borrow a certain Sum of Money upon the Security of his entailed Estates, for Repayment to him of a Portion of the Monies laid out by him in the Improvement of these Estates.
Gervis's Estate Act 1844	7 & 8 Vict. c. 27 Pr.	6 August 1844
An Act to enable the Trustees of the Will of Sir George William Tapps Gervis Baronet, deceased, to convey a Church at Bournemouth in the County of Southampton to Her Majesty's Commissioners for building new Churches, and to endow the same.
Bowyer's Estate Act 1844	7 & 8 Vict. c. 28 Pr.	6 August 1844
An Act for enabling the Trustees of the Will of William Atkins Bowyer Esquire, deceased, to grant building, improving, and other Leases of certain Estates at Clapham in the County of Surrey, devised by the said Will and the Second Codicil thereto to the Trustees therein named.
Lord Cranstoun's Estate Act 1844	7 & 8 Vict. c. 29 Pr.	6 August 1844
An Act for effecting an Exchange of the entailed Estate of Rosehall, belonging to the Right Honourable James Edward Lord Cranstoun, situated in the County of Sutherland, for certain Lands in the County of Kincardine belonging to James Matheson Esquire, of Achany.
Bishop of London's Estate Act 1844	7 & 8 Vict. c. 30 Pr.	6 August 1844
An Act for confirming and carrying into execution certain Articles of Agreement made and entered into between Charles James Lord Bishop of London, Thomas Thistlethwayte Esquire, Thomas Somers Cocks Esquire, Christopher Hodgson Esquire, the Company of Proprietors of the Grand Junction Canal, and the Grand Junction Waterworks Company; and for other Purposes therein mentioned.
Devayne's Estate Act 1844	7 & 8 Vict. c. 31 Pr.	6 August 1844
An Act for vesting Farts of the Estates of William Devalues Esquire, deceased, in Trustees, upon trust to be sold; and for paying off a Mortgage Debt of Eight thousand two hundred Pounds due to James Parkinson Esquire, out of the first Purchase Monies, and for laying out the Residue of the Purchase Monies, under the Direction of the Court of Chancery, in the Purchase of other Estates, to be settled to the same Uses.
Bishop of Down, Connor and Dromore's Estate Act 1844	7 & 8 Vict. c. 32 Pr.	6 August 1844
An Act for annexing to the united Bishopricks of Down, Connor, and Dramore the House known as Down and Connor House, with the Appurtenances; and for other Purposes.
Ladbroke's Estate Act 1844	7 & 8 Vict. c. 33 Pr.	6 August 1844
An Act to confirm certain Contracts for Leases made and entered into by James Weller Ladbroke Esquire of Lands and Premises at or near Notting Hill in the County of Middlesex; and to alter and enlarge the Powers of an Act passed in the First and Second Years of the Reign of His late Majesty King George the Fourth, intituled "An Act to enable James Weller Ladbroke Esquire and others to grant Building Leases of Lands in Kensington, Paddington, Notting Barns, and Westborne, in the County of Middlesex"; (Note: James Ladbroke's Estates Act 1821 (1 & 2 Geo. 4. c. 26 Pr.)) and for other Purposes relating thereto.
Duke of Hamilton and Brandon's Estate Act 1844	7 & 8 Vict. c. 34 Pr.	9 August 1844
An Act to explain an Act passed in the First Year of Her present Majesty, intituled "An Act for authorizing the Sale and Exchange of the Real Estate devised by the Will of the Right Honourable William Henry Earl of Rochford deceased, and for the Application of the Produce thereof; and for authorizing the granting of Leases of the same Estate; and for other Purposes"; (Note: William Earl of Rochford's Estate Act 1838 (1 & 2 Vict. c. 34 Pr.)) and for extending the Operation of such Act to certain Parties whose Consent thereto was required.
Sang's Naturalization Act 1844 (Note: This act was not printed by the Queen's Printer.)	7 & 8 Vict. c. 35 Pr.	5 March 1844
An Act for naturalizing John Frederick Sang.
Schuster's Naturalization Act 1844	7 & 8 Vict. c. 36 Pr.	10 May 1844
An Act for naturalizing Samuel Schuster.
Dowager Lady Nugent's Naturalization Act 1844	7 & 8 Vict. c. 37 Pr.	10 May 1844
An Act for naturalizing Dame Susan Victoria Regina, Widow of Sir James Nugent, Baronet, deceased.
Lascaridi's Naturalization Act 1844	7 & 8 Vict. c. 38 Pr.	10 May 1844
An Act for naturalizing Antonio Lascaridi.
Spartali's Naturalization Act 1844	7 & 8 Vict. c. 39 Pr.	10 May 1844
An Act for naturalizing Michael Spartali.
Cababé's Naturalization Act 1844	7 & 8 Vict. c. 40 Pr.	10 May 1844
An Act for naturalizing Paul Cababé.
Figge's Naturalization Act 1844	7 & 8 Vict. c. 41 Pr.	23 May 1844
An Act for naturalizing Frederick Figge.
Malan's Naturalization Act 1844	7 & 8 Vict. c. 42 Pr.	23 May 1844
An Act for naturalizing Henri Victor Malan.
Rodbard's Name Act 1844	7 & 8 Vict. c. 43 Pr.	6 June 1844
An Act to enable Mary Bean, Widow, and her Issue, and Edward Whitley, Esquire, and Charlotte, his Wife, and the Issue of the said Charlotte Whitley respectively, to take the Surname and use the Arms of Rodbard.
Marianski's Naturalization Act 1844	7 & 8 Vict. c. 44 Pr.	4 July 1844
An Act for naturalizing Dionysius Onlifri Marianski.
Archbutt's Divorce Act 1844	7 & 8 Vict. c. 45 Pr.	29 July 1844
An Act to dissolve the Marriage of Samuel Archbutt, the younger, Gentleman, with Mary Amelia, his now Wife, and to enable him to marry again, and for other Purposes therein mentioned.
Werrington and St. Giles-in-the Heath Curacies Act 1844	7 & 8 Vict. c. 46 Pr.	6 August 1844
An Act for authorizing the Endowment of the Curacies of Werrington and Saint Giles-in-the-Heath, in the County of Devon, and the Alienation and Conveyance of the Rights Of Patronage of the same Curacies respectively to Persons who shall further endow the same, and for other Purposes relating thereto.
Cheape's Divorce Act 1844	7 & 8 Vict. c. 47 Pr.	6 August 1844
An Act to dissolve the Marriage of John Cheape, Esquire, a Lieutenant Colonel in the Military Service of the Honourable East India Company, with Amelia Frances Chicheley Cheape, his now Wife, and to enable him to marry again, and for other Purposes therein mentioned.
Hough's Divorce Act 1844	7 & 8 Vict. c. 48 Pr.	6 August 1844
An Act to dissolve the Marriage of William Hough, a Major in the Military Service of the Honourable East India Company, with Sophia, his now Wife, and to enable him to marry again, and for other Purposes.
Gape's Divorce Act 1844	7 & 8 Vict. c. 49 Pr.	9 August 1844
An Act to dissolve the Marriage of Thomas Foreman Gape with Fanny Louisa, his now Wife, and to enable him to marry again, and for other Purposes therein mentioned.

=== Sources ===
- The Statutes of the United Kingdom of Great Britain and Ireland, 7 & 8 Victoria. London. 1844 – via Internet Archive.
- The Statutes of the United Kingdom of Great Britain and Ireland, 7 & 8 Victoria. London. 1844 – via Google Books.
- A Collection of the Public General Statutes passed in the Seventh and Eighth Years of the Reign of Her Majesty Queen Victoria, 1844. London: Eyre and Spottiswoode. 1844 – via Internet Archive.
- A Collection of the Public General Statutes passed in the Seventh and Eighth Years of the Reign of Her Majesty Queen Victoria, 1844. London: Eyre and Spottiswoode. 1844 – via Google Books.
- Journals of the House of Commons (PDF). Vol. 99 – via parliament.uk.

== See also ==
- List of acts of the Parliament of the United Kingdom
