= List of acts of the Parliament of the United Kingdom from 1823 =

This is a complete list of acts of the Parliament of the United Kingdom for the year 1823.

Note that the first parliament of the United Kingdom was held in 1801; parliaments between 1707 and 1800 were either parliaments of Great Britain or of Ireland). For acts passed up until 1707, see the list of acts of the Parliament of England and the list of acts of the Parliament of Scotland. For acts passed from 1707 to 1800, see the list of acts of the Parliament of Great Britain. See also the list of acts of the Parliament of Ireland.

For acts of the devolved parliaments and assemblies in the United Kingdom, see the list of acts of the Scottish Parliament, the list of acts of the Northern Ireland Assembly, and the list of acts and measures of Senedd Cymru; see also the list of acts of the Parliament of Northern Ireland.

The number shown after each act's title is its chapter number. Acts passed before 1963 are cited using this number, preceded by the year(s) of the reign during which the relevant parliamentary session was held; thus the Union with Ireland Act 1800 is cited as "39 & 40 Geo. 3 c. 67", meaning the 67th act passed during the session that started in the 39th year of the reign of George III and which finished in the 40th year of that reign. Note that the modern convention is to use Arabic numerals in citations (thus "41 Geo. 3" rather than "41 Geo. III"). Acts of the last session of the Parliament of Great Britain and the first session of the Parliament of the United Kingdom are both cited as "41 Geo. 3". Acts passed from 1963 onwards are simply cited by calendar year and chapter number.

All modern acts have a short title, e.g. the Local Government Act 2003. Some earlier acts also have a short title given to them by later acts, such as by the Short Titles Act 1896.

== 4 Geo. 4 ==
The fourth session of the 7th Parliament of the United Kingdom, which met from 4 February 1823 until 19 July 1823.

This session was also traditionally cited as 4 G. 4.

=== Public general acts ===
Short title	Citation	Royal assent
Long title
Indemnity Act 1823 (repealed)	4 Geo. 4. c. 1	27 February 1823
An act to indemnify such Persons in the United Kingdom as have omitted to qualify themselves for Offices and Employments, and for extending the Time limited for those Purposes respectively, until the Twenty fifth Day of March One thousand eight hundred and twenty four; to permit such Persons in Great Britain as have omitted to make and file Affidavits of the Execution of Indentures of Clerks to Attornies and Solicitors, to make and file the same on or before the First Day of Hilary Term One thousand eight hundred and twenty four; and to allow Persons to make and file such Affidavits, although the Persons whom they served shall have neglected to take out their Annual Certificates. (Repealed by Promissory Oaths Act 1871 (34 & 35 Vict. c. 48))
Trade, American Colonies and West Indies Act 1823 (repealed)	4 Geo. 4. c. 2	7 March 1823
An act to amend an Act of the last Session of Parliament, (Note: Trade Act (No. 2) 1822 (3 Geo. 4. c. 45)) for regulating the Trade between His Majesty's Possessions in America and the West Indies and other Parts of the World. (Repealed by Customs Law Repeal Act 1825 (6 Geo. 4. c. 105))
Duties on Sugar, etc. Act 1823 (repealed)	4 Geo. 4. c. 3	7 March 1823
An Act for continuing to His Majesty for One Year certain Duties on Sugar, Tobacco and Snuff, Foreign Spirits and Sweets, in Great Britain; and on Pensions, Offices and Personal Estates in England; and for receiving the Contributions of Persons receiving Pensions and holding Offices; for the Service of the Year One thousand eight hundred and twenty three. (Repealed by Statute Law Revision Act 1873 (36 & 37 Vict. c. 91))
Exchequer Bills Act 1823 (repealed)	4 Geo. 4. c. 4	7 March 1823
An Act for raising the Sum of Twenty Millions by Exchequer Bills for the Service of the Year One thousand eight hundred and twenty three. (Repealed by Statute Law Revision Act 1873 (36 & 37 Vict. c. 91))
Confirmation of Certain Marriages Act 1823 (repealed)	4 Geo. 4. c. 5	7 March 1823
An Act to render valid certain Marriages. (Repealed by Statute Law (Repeals) Act 1977 (c. 18))
Supply Act 1823 (repealed)	4 Geo. 4. c. 6	19 March 1823
An Act for applying certain Monies therein mentioned for the Service of the Year One thousand eight hundred and twenty three. (Repealed by Statute Law Revision Act 1873 (36 & 37 Vict. c. 91))
Chancellor of the Exchequer (Ireland) Act 1823 (repealed)	4 Geo. 4. c. 7	19 March 1823
An Act to regulate the Appointment and Swearing into Office of the Chancellor of the Exchequer of Ireland. (Repealed by Statute Law Revision Act 1873 (36 & 37 Vict. c. 91) and Statute Law Revision Act 1953 (2 & 3 Eliz. 2. c. 5))
Payment of Creditors (Scotland) Act 1823 (repealed)	4 Geo. 4. c. 8	19 March 1823
An Act to continue until the Twenty fifth Day of July One thousand eight hundred and twenty four, and from thence to the End of the then next Session of Parliament, an Act made in the Fifty fourth Year of His late Majesty, (Note: Payment of Creditors (Scotland) Act 1814 (54 Geo. 3. c. 137)) for rendering the Payment of Creditors more equal and expeditious in Scotland. (Repealed by Statute Law Revision Act 1873 (36 & 37 Vict. c. 91))
Duties on Servants, etc. (Ireland) Act 1823 (repealed)	4 Geo. 4. c. 9	19 March 1823
An Act to repeal the Rates, Duties and Taxes payable in respect of Male Servants, Horses, Carriages and Dogs in Ireland. (Repealed by Statute Law Revision Act 1873 (36 & 37 Vict. c. 91))
Roads in Lanarkshire, etc. Act 1823 (repealed)	4 Geo. 4. c. 10	19 March 1823
An Act to rectify a Mistake in an Act, intituled "An Act for making and maintaining certain Roads and Bridges in the Counties of Lanark and Dumbarton," (Note: Lanark and Dumbarton Roads and Bridges Act 1820 (1 Geo. 4. c. lxxxiv)) in so far as relates to the Application of certain Exchequer Bills therein mentioned. (Repealed by Statute Law Revision Act 1873 (36 & 37 Vict. c. 91))
Assessed Taxes Act 1823 (repealed)	4 Geo. 4. c. 11	19 March 1823
An Act for repealing certain of the Duties of Assessed Taxes; for reducing certain other of the said Duties; and for relieving Persons who have compounded for the same. (Repealed by Statute Law Revision Act 1873 (36 & 37 Vict. c. 91))
Marine Mutiny Act 1823 (repealed)	4 Geo. 4. c. 12	24 March 1823
An Act for the regulating of His Majesty's Royal Marine Forces while on Shore. (Repealed by Statute Law Revision Act 1873 (36 & 37 Vict. c. 91))
Mutiny Act 1823 (repealed)	4 Geo. 4. c. 13	24 March 1823
An Act for punishing Mutiny and Desertion; and for the better Payment of the Army and their Quarters. (Repealed by Statute Law Revision Act 1873 (36 & 37 Vict. c. 91))
Arms (Ireland) Act 1823 (repealed)	4 Geo. 4. c. 14	24 March 1823
An Act to continue for Five Years, and from thence until the End of the then next Session of Parliament, Two Acts made in the Forty seventh (Note: Possession of Arms (Ireland) Act 1807 (47 Geo. 3 Sess. 2. c. 54)) and Fiftieth (Note: Arms (Ireland) Act 1810 (50 Geo. 3. c. 109)) Years of the Reign of His late Majesty King George the Third, for the preventing improper Persons from having Arms in Ireland. (Repealed by Statute Law Revision Act 1873 (36 & 37 Vict. c. 91))
Yeomanry Corps (Ireland) Act 1823 (repealed)	4 Geo. 4. c. 15	24 March 1823
An Act to continue for Five Years, and from thence until the End of the then next Session of Parliament, and to amend the Laws relating to Yeomanry Corps, in Ireland. (Repealed by Statute Law Revision Act 1873 (36 & 37 Vict. c. 91))
Turnpike Roads (Tolls on Lime) Act 1823 (repealed)	4 Geo. 4. c. 16	24 March 1823
An Act to explain so much of the General Turnpike Act, (Note: Turnpike Roads Act 1822 (3 Geo. 4. c. 126)) as relates to the Toll payable on Carriages laden with Lime for the Improvement of Land. (Repealed by Statute Law (Repeals) Act 1981 (c. 19))
Clandestine Marriages Act 1823 (repealed)	4 Geo. 4. c. 17	26 March 1823
An Act to repeal certain Provisions of an Act passed in the Third Year of His present Majesty, intituled "An Act to amend certain Provisions of the Twenty sixth of George the Second, (Note: Clandestine Marriages Act 1753 (26 Geo. 2. c. 33)) for the better preventing of clandestine Marriages." (Note: Confirmation of Marriages Act 1822 (3 Geo. 4. c. 75)) (Repealed by Marriage Act 1823 (4 Geo. 4. c. 76))
Crown Lands Act 1823	4 Geo. 4. c. 18	26 March 1823
An Act concerning the disposition of certain property of His Majesty, his heirs and successors.
National Debt Reduction Act 1823	4 Geo. 4. c. 19	26 March 1823
An Act for further regulating the Reduction of the National Debt.
Quartering of Soldiers Act 1823 (repealed)	4 Geo. 4. c. 20	2 May 1823
An Act for fixing the Rates of Subsistence to be paid to Innkeepers and others on quartering Soldiers. (Repealed by Statute Law Revision Act 1873 (36 & 37 Vict. c. 91))
Supply (No. 2) Act 1823 (repealed)	4 Geo. 4. c. 21	2 May 1823
An Act for granting and applying certain Sums of Money for the Service of the Year One thousand eight hundred and twenty three. (Repealed by Statute Law Revision Act 1873 (36 & 37 Vict. c. 91))
Dead-weight Annuity Act 1823 (repealed)	4 Geo. 4. c. 22	2 May 1823
An Act to confirm an Agreement entered into by the Trustees under an Act of the last Session of Parliament, (Note: Dead-weight Annuity Act 1822 (3 Geo. 4. c. 51)) for apportioning the Burthen occasioned by the Military and Naval Pensions, and Civil Superannuations, with the Governor and Company of the Bank of England. (Repealed by Statute Law Revision Act 1870 (33 & 34 Vict. c. 69))
Customs and Excise Act 1823 (repealed)	4 Geo. 4. c. 23	2 May 1823
An Act to consolidate the several Boards of Customs, and also, the several Boards of Excise, of Great Britain and Ireland. (Repealed by Statute Law Revision Act 1861 (24 & 25 Vict. c. 101))
Warehousing of Goods Act 1823 (repealed)	4 Geo. 4. c. 24	12 May 1823
An Act to make more effectual Provision for permitting Goods imported to be secured in Warehouses, or other Places, without Payment of Duty on the first Entry thereof. (Repealed by Customs Law Repeal Act 1825 (6 Geo. 4. c. 105))
Merchant Seamen, etc. Act 1823 (repealed)	4 Geo. 4. c. 25	12 May 1823
An Act for regulating the Number of Apprentices to be taken on board British Merchant Vessels; and for preventing the Desertion of Seamen therefrom. (Repealed by Merchant Seamen Act 1835 (5 & 6 Will. 4. c. 19))
Importation Act 1823 (repealed)	4 Geo. 4. c. 26	23 May 1823
An Act to repeal the Duties on certain Articles, and to provide for the gradual Discontinuance of the Duties on certain other Articles, the Manufacture of Great Britain and Ireland respectively, on their Importation into either Country from the other. (Repealed by Customs Law Repeal Act 1825 (6 Geo. 4. c. 105))
Justice of the Peace Act 1823 (repealed)	4 Geo. 4. c. 27	23 May 1823
An Act to amend an Act passed in the Seventh Year of the Reign of His late Majesty King George the Third, (Note: Justices Quorum Act 1766 (7 Geo. 3. c. 21)) respecting Justice of the Quorum in Cities and Towns Corporate. (Repealed by Statute Law Revision (No. 2) Act 1890 (53 & 54 Vict. c. 51))
Militia (Ireland) Act 1823 (repealed)	4 Geo. 4. c. 28	23 May 1823
An Act for the more speedy Reduction of the Number of Serjeants, Corporals and Drummers in the Militia of Ireland, when not in actual service. (Repealed by Statute Law Revision Act 1873 (36 & 37 Vict. c. 91))
Powers of Justices as to Apprenticeships Act 1823 (repealed)	4 Geo. 4. c. 29	23 May 1823
An Act to increase the Power of Magistrates, in Cases of Apprenticeships. (Repealed by Combinations of Workmen Act 1825 (6 Geo. 4. c. 129))
Countervening Duties of Excise Act 1823 (repealed)	4 Geo. 4. c. 30	30 May 1823
An Act to regulate the Importation and Exportation of certain Articles subject to Duties of Excise, and certain other Articles the Produce or Manufacture of Great Britain and Ireland respectively, into and from either Country from and to the other. (Repealed by Statute Law Revision Act 1873 (36 & 37 Vict. c. 91))
Cursing and Swearing Act 1823 (repealed)	4 Geo. 4. c. 31	30 May 1823
An Act to amend an Act passed in the Nineteenth Year of the Reign of His late Majesty King George the Second, intituled "An Act more effectually to prevent profane Cursing and Swearing." (Note: Profane Oaths Act 1745 (19 Geo. 2. c. 21)) (Repealed by Statute Law Revision Act 1873 (36 & 37 Vict. c. 91))
Charitable Loan Societies (Ireland) Act 1823 (repealed)	4 Geo. 4. c. 32	30 May 1823
An act for the Amendment of the Laws respecting Charitable Loan Societies in Ireland. (Repealed by Loan Societies Act 1843 (6 & 7 Vict. c. 41))
County Treasurers (Ireland) Act 1823 (repealed)	4 Geo. 4. c. 33	30 May 1823
An Act to make more effectual Regulations for the Election, and to secure the Performance of the Duties, of County Treasurers in Ireland. (Repealed by Statute Law Revision Act 1873 (36 & 37 Vict. c. 91) and Local Government (Ireland) Act 1898 (61 & 62 Vict. c. 37))
Master and Servant Act 1823 (repealed)	4 Geo. 4. c. 34	17 June 1823
An Act to enlarge the Powers of Justices in determining Complaints between Masters and Servants, and between Masters, Apprentices, Artificers and others. (Repealed by Conspiracy, and Protection of Property Act 1875 (38 & 39 Vict. c. 86))
Statutory Commissioners Act 1823 (repealed)	4 Geo. 4. c. 35	27 June 1823
An Act to enable Trustees or Commissioners under Acts of Parliament to meet and carry such Acts in Execution although they may not have met according to the Directions of such Acts. (Repealed by Statute Law Revision Act 1963 (c. 30))
Joint Tenancy (Ireland) Act 1823 (repealed)	4 Geo. 4. c. 36	27 June 1823
An Act to discourage the granting of Leases in Joint Tenancy in Ireland. (Repealed by Representation of the People Act 1918 (7 & 8 Geo. 5. c. 64))
Levy of Fines Act 1823 (repealed)	4 Geo. 4. c. 37	27 June 1823
An Act to amend an Act (Note: Levy of Fines Act 1822 (3 Geo. 4. c. 46)) for the more speedy Return and Levying of Fines, Penalties, and Forfeitures, and Recognizances estreated. (Repealed by Criminal Justice Act 1967 (c. 80))
Compensation for Law Offices (Ireland) Act 1823 (repealed)	4 Geo. 4. c. 38	27 June 1823
An Act for settling the Compensation to the Holders of certain Offices in the Courts of Law in Ireland, abolished under an Act passed in the First and Second Years of the Reign of His present Majesty, (Note: Common Law Procedure (Ireland) Act 1821 (1 & 2 Geo. 4. c. 53)) for regulating the same. (Repealed by Statute Law Revision Act 1873 (36 & 37 Vict. c. 91))
Customs Act 1823 (repealed)	4 Geo. 4. c. 39	27 June 1823
An Act to continue an Act of the last Session of Parliament, (Note: Duties on Brimstone Act 1822 (3 Geo. 4. c. 107)) for allowing a Drawback of the Whole of the Duties of Customs on Brimstone used and consumed in Great Britain in the making and preparing Oil of Vitriol or Sulphuric Acid. (Repealed by Customs Law Repeal Act 1825 (6 Geo. 4. c. 105))
Linen and Hempen Manufactures (Scotland) Act 1823 (repealed)	4 Geo. 4. c. 40	27 June 1823
An Act to amend several Acts for the Regulation of the Linen and Hempen Manufactures in Scotland. (Repealed by Statute Law Revision Act 1890 (53 & 54 Vict. c. 33))
Registering of Vessels Act 1823 (repealed)	4 Geo. 4. c. 41	27 June 1823
An Act for the registering of Vessels. (Repealed by Customs Law Repeal Act 1825 (6 Geo. 4. c. 105))
Support of Commercial Credit (Ireland) Act 1823 (repealed)	4 Geo. 4. c. 42	27 June 1823
An Act to amend the several Acts for the Assistance of Trade and Manufactures, and the Support of Commercial Credit. (Repealed by Statute Law Revision Act 1873 (36 & 37 Vict. c. 91))
Salaries of County Officers (Ireland) Act 1823 (repealed)	4 Geo. 4. c. 43	27 June 1823
An Act to regulate the Amount of Presentments by Grand Juries, for Payment of the Public Officers of the several Counties in Ireland. (Repealed by Statute Law Revision Act 1873 (36 & 37 Vict. c. 91))
Duties, etc., on Barilla Act 1823 (repealed)	4 Geo. 4. c. 44	27 June 1823
An Act to repeal the Duties and Drawbacks on Barilla imported into the United Kingdom, and to grant other Duties and Drawbacks in lieu thereof. (Repealed by Customs Law Repeal Act 1825 (6 Geo. 4. c. 105))
Assessed Taxes Act 1823 (repealed)	4 Geo. 4. c. 45	4 July 1823
An Act for allowing Persons to compound for their Assessed Taxes for the Remainder of the Periods of Composition limited by former Acts; and for giving Relief in certain Cases therein mentioned. (Repealed by Statute Law Revision Act 1861 (24 & 25 Vict. c. 101))
Capital Punishments, etc. Act 1823 (repealed)	4 Geo. 4. c. 46	4 July 1823
An Act for repealing the Capital Punishments inflicted by several Acts of the Sixth (Note: Perpetuation of Various Laws Act 1732 (6 Geo. 2. c. 37)) and Twenty-seventh (Note: Bedford Level Act 1754 (27 Geo. 2. c. 19)) Years of King George the Second, and of the Third, (Note: Greenwich Out-Pensioners Act 1763 (3 Geo. 3. c. 16)) Fourth (Note: Manufacture of Cambrics Act 1763 (4 Geo. 3. c. 37)) and Twenty-second (Note: Criminal Law Act 1782 (22 Geo. 3. c. 40)) Years of King George the Third; and for providing other Punishments in lieu thereof, and in lieu of the Punishment of Frame breaking under an Act of Twenty eighth (Note: Protection of Stocking Frames, etc. Act 1788 (28 Geo. 3. c. 55)) Year of the same Reign. (Repealed by Statute Law (Repeals) Act 1976 (c. 16))
Male Convicts Act 1823 (repealed)	4 Geo. 4. c. 47	4 July 1823
An Act for authorizing the Employment at Labour, in the Colonies, of Male Convicts under Sentence of Transportation. (Repealed by Statute Law Revision Act 1873 (36 & 37 Vict. c. 91))
Judgment of Death Act 1823 (repealed)	4 Geo. 4. c. 48	4 July 1823
An Act for enabling Courts to abstain from pronouncing Sentence of Death in certain Capital Felonies. (Repealed for England and Wales by Courts Act 1971 (c. 23) and for Northern Ireland by Statute Law Revision (Northern Ireland) Act 1980 (c. 59))
Turnpike Roads (Scotland) Act 1823 (repealed)	4 Geo. 4. c. 49	4 July 1823
An Act for regulating Turnpike Roads in that Part of Great Britain called Scotland. (Repealed by Turnpike Roads (Scotland) Act 1831 (1 & 2 Will. 4. c. 43))
Rebuilding of London Bridge Act 1823	4 Geo. 4. c. 50	4 July 1823
An Act for the rebuilding of London Bridge, and for improving and making suitable Approaches thereto.
Duties on Beer, etc. Act 1823 (repealed)	4 Geo. 4. c. 51	8 July 1823
An Act to encourage the Consumption of Beer; and to amend the Laws for securing the Excise Duties thereon. (Repealed by Statute Law Revision Act 1873 (36 & 37 Vict. c. 91))
Burial of Suicide Act 1823 or the Right to Burial Act 1823 (repealed)	4 Geo. 4. c. 52	8 July 1823
An act to alter and amend the Law relating to the Interment of the Remains of any Person found Felo de se. (Repealed by Interments (felo de se) Act 1882 (45 & 46 Vict. c. 19))
Benefit of Clergy, etc. Act 1823 (repealed)	4 Geo. 4. c. 53	8 July 1823
An Act for extending the Benefit of Clergy to several Larcenies therein mentioned. (Repealed by Statute Law Revision Act 1873 (36 & 37 Vict. c. 91))
Benefit of Clergy, etc. (No. 2) Act 1823 (repealed)	4 Geo. 4. c. 54	8 July 1823
An Act for allowing the Benefit of Clergy to Persons convicted of certain Felonies under Two Acts, of the Ninth Year of King George the First (Note: Criminal Law Act 1722 (9 Geo. 1. c. 22)) and of the Twenty seventh Year of King George the Second; (Note: Persons Going Armed and Disguised Act 1754 (27 Geo. 2. c. 15)) for making better Provision for the Punishment of Persons guilty of sending or delivering threatening Letters, and of Assaults with Intent to commit Robbery. (Repealed by Criminal Statutes Repeal Act 1861 (24 & 25 Vict. c. 95))
Parliamentary Elections (Ireland) Act 1823 (repealed)	4 Geo. 4. c. 55	8 July 1823
An Act to consolidate and amend the several Acts now in force so far as the same relate to the Election and Return of Members to serve in Parliament for Counties of Cities and Counties of Towns in Ireland. (Repealed by Representation of the People Act 1948 (11 & 12 Geo. 6. c. 65) and Electoral Administration Act 2006 (c. 22))
Military Roads, etc. (Scotland) Act 1823 (repealed)	4 Geo. 4. c. 56	8 July 1823
An Act for maintaining in Repair the Military and Parliamentary Roads and Bridges in the Highlands of Scotland, and also certain Ferry Piers and Shipping Quays erected by the Commissioners for Highland Roads and Bridges. (Repealed by Statute Law Revision Act 1873 (36 & 37 Vict. c. 91))
Duties, etc., on Barilla (No. 2) Act 1823 (repealed)	4 Geo. 4. c. 57	9 July 1823
An Act to defer the Commencement of the Duties and Drawbacks on Barilla, under an Act of this present Session of Parliament. (Note: Duties, etc., on Barilla Act 1823 (4 Geo. 4. c. 44)) (Repealed by Statute Law Revision Act 1873 (36 & 37 Vict. c. 91))
Insurrections, etc. (Ireland) Act 1823 (repealed)	4 Geo. 4. c. 58	9 July 1823
An Act to continue, until the First Day of August One thousand eight hundred and twenty four, an Act, made in the last Session of Parliament, (Note: Suppression of Insurrections (Ireland) Act 1822 (3 Geo. 4. c. 1)) for suppressing Insurrections and preventing Disturbances of the Public Peace in Ireland. (Repealed by Statute Law Revision Act 1873 (36 & 37 Vict. c. 91))
Militia Pay Act 1823 (repealed)	4 Geo. 4. c. 59	9 July 1823
An Act to defray the Charge of the Pay, Clothing and contingent and other Expences of the Disembodied Militia in Great Britain and Ireland; and to grant Allowances in certain Cases to Subaltern Officers, Adjutants, Quartermasters, Surgeons, Assistant Surgeons, Surgeons' Mates and Serjeant Majors of Militia, until the Twenty fifth Day of March One thousand eight hundred and twenty four. (Repealed by Statute Law Revision Act 1873 (36 & 37 Vict. c. 91))
Lotteries Act 1823 (repealed)	4 Geo. 4. c. 60	9 July 1823
An Act for granting to His Majesty a Sum of Money to be raised by Lotteries. (Repealed for England and Wales by Betting and Lotteries Act 1934 (24 & 25 Geo. 5. c. 58) and for Northern Ireland by Betting and Lotteries Act (Northern Ireland) 1957 (c. 19 (N.I.)))
Court of Chancery (Ireland) Act 1823 (repealed)	4 Geo. 4. c. 61	10 July 1823
An Act for the better Administration of Justice in the Court of Chancery in Ireland. (Repealed by Judicature (Northern Ireland) Act 1978 (c. 23))
Duties on Horses Act 1823 (repealed)	4 Geo. 4. c. 62	10 July 1823
An Act to repeal the Duties upon Horses let to hire for the Purpose of travelling in Great Britain, and to grant other Duties in lieu thereof; and to provide for letting the same to farm. (Repealed by Stage Carriages Act 1832 (2 & 3 Will. 4. c. 120))
Advances for Building Gaols, etc. (England) Act 1823 (repealed)	4 Geo. 4. c. 63	10 July 1823
An Act to authorize the Advance of Money by the Commissioners under several Acts for the Issue of Exchequer Bills for Public Works, for the buildings rebuilding, enlarging or repairing of Gaols in England. (Repealed by Statute Law Revision Act 1873 (36 & 37 Vict. c. 91))
Gaols Act 1823 or the Gaol Act 1823 or the Gaols, etc. (England) Act 1823 or the Prison Act 1823 or the Prisons Act 1823 (repealed)	4 Geo. 4. c. 64	10 July 1823
An Act for consolidating and amending the Laws relating to the building, repairing and regulating of certain Gaols and Houses of Correction in England and Wales. (Repealed by Prison Act 1865 (28 & 29 Vict. c. 126))
Distribution of Prize Money Act 1823 (repealed)	4 Geo. 4. c. 65	10 July 1823
An Act to extend Two Acts of His late Majesty, (Note: Prize Act 1807 (47 Geo. 3 Sess. 1. c. 47)) (Note: Prize Act 1808 (48 Geo. 3. c. 100)) for Distribution of Prize Money, to all Cases of Capture that have been made by Foreign Ships or Land Forces in Conjunction with His Majesty's Ships or Land Forces. (Repealed by Army Prize Money Act 1832 (2 & 3 Will. 4. c. 53))
Importation and Exportation Act 1823 (repealed)	4 Geo. 4. c. 66	10 July 1823
An Act to authorize, in certain Cases, the Reduction of the Duties payable in Ireland, and the Alteration of the Duties and Drawbacks on the Importation and Exportation of Goods between Great Britain and Ireland. (Repealed by Customs Law Repeal Act 1825 (6 Geo. 4. c. 105))
Marriages Confirmation (St. Petersburg) Act 1823 (repealed)	4 Geo. 4. c. 67	10 July 1823
An Act to declare valid certain Marriages that have been solemnized at St. Petersburgh since the Abolition of the British Factory there. (Repealed by Marriage Act 1890 (53 & 54 Vict. c. 47))
Land Tax Commissioners Act 1823 (repealed)	4 Geo. 4. c. 68	10 July 1823
An Act for rectifying Mistakes in the Names of the Land Tax Commissioners, and for appointing additional Commissioners, and indemnifying such Persons as have acted without due Authority in Execution of the Acts therein recited. (Repealed by Statute Law Revision Act 1873 (36 & 37 Vict. c. 91))
Customs (No. 2) Act 1823 (repealed)	4 Geo. 4. c. 69	11 July 1823
An Act to repeal certain Duties of Customs in Great Britain and to grant other Duties in lieu thereof; to grant Bounties on Salted Provisions and Silk Manufactures exported; and to make more effectual Regulations for collecting the Duties of Customs. (Repealed by Customs Law Repeal Act 1825 (6 Geo. 4. c. 105))
Court of Exchequer (Ireland) Act 1823 (repealed)	4 Geo. 4. c. 70	11 July 1823
An Act for the better Administration of Justice in the Equity Side of the Court of Exchequer in Ireland. (Repealed by Statute Law Revision Act 1861 (24 & 25 Vict. c. 101))
Indian Bishops and Courts Act 1823 (repealed)	4 Geo. 4. c. 71	11 July 1823
An Act for defraying the Charge of Retiring Pay, Pensions and other Expences of that Nature, of His Majesty's Forces serving in India; for establishing the Pensions of the Bishop, Archdeacons and Judges; for regulating Ordinations; and for establishing a Court of Judicature at Bombay. (Repealed by Government of India Act 1915 (5 & 6 Geo. 5. c. 61))
Customs Duties (Ireland) Act 1823 (repealed)	4 Geo. 4. c. 72	11 July 1823
An Act to repeal the several Duties and Drawbacks of Customs chargeable and allowable in Ireland, on the Importation and Exportation of certain Foreign and Colonial Wares and Merchandize, and to grant other Duties and Drawbacks in lieu thereof equal to the Duties and Drawbacks chargeable and allowable thereon in Great Britain. (Repealed by Statute Law Revision Act 1873 (36 & 37 Vict. c. 91))
Malicious Injuries to Property (Ireland) Act 1823 (repealed)	4 Geo. 4. c. 73	11 July 1823
An Act to facilitate the Recovery of Damages for Malicious Injuries to Property in Ireland. (Repealed by Statute Law Revision Act 1873 (36 & 37 Vict. c. 91))
Holyhead Road Act 1823 or the Howth and Holyhead Harbours Act 1823	4 Geo. 4. c. 74	11 July 1823
An Act for vesting in Commissioners the Bridges now building over the Menai Straits and the River Conway, and the Harbours of Howth and Holyhead, and the Road from Dublin to Howth, and for the further Improvement of the Road from London to Holyhead.
Land at Kew Green, Surrey Act 1823 (repealed)	4 Geo. 4. c. 75	11 July 1823
An Act for enabling His Majesty to inclose Part of Kew Green, and for dividing and extinguishing Rights of Common over certain Lands in the Parish of Kew, in the County of Surrey. (Repealed by Statute Law (Repeals) Act 1978 (c. 45))
Marriage Act 1823 (repealed)	4 Geo. 4. c. 76	18 July 1823
An Act for amending the Laws respecting the Solemnization of Marriages in England. (Repealed by Marriage Act 1949 (12, 13 & 14 Geo. 6. c. 76))
Importation, etc., in Foreign Vessels Act 1823 (repealed)	4 Geo. 4. c. 77	18 July 1823
An Act to authorize His Majesty, under certain Circumstances, to regulate the Duties and Drawbacks on Goods imported or exported in Foreign Vessels; and to exempt certain Foreign Vessels from Pilotage. (Repealed by Statute Law Revision Act 1873 (36 & 37 Vict. c. 91))
Stamp Duties (Court of Chancery (Ireland)) Act 1823 (repealed)	4 Geo. 4. c. 78	18 July 1823
An Act to grant additional Stamp Duties on certain Proceedings in the Court of Chancery and in the Equity Side of the Court of Exchequer in Ireland. (Repealed by Statute Law Revision Act 1890 (53 & 54 Vict. c. 33))
Additional Places of Worship in the Highlands Act 1823 (repealed)	4 Geo. 4. c. 79	18 July 1823
An Act for building additional places of worship in the Highlands and Islands of Scotland. (Repealed by Statute Law (Repeals) Act 1973 (c. 39))
Lascars Act 1823 (repealed)	4 Geo. 4. c. 80	18 July 1823
An Act to consolidate and amend the several Laws now in force with respect to Trade from and to Places within the Limits of the Charter of the East India Company, and to make further Provisions with respect to such Trade; and to amend an Act of the present Session of Parliament, (Note: Registering of Vessels Act 1823 (4 Geo. 4. c. 41)) for the registering of Vessels, so far as it relates to Vessels registered in India. (Repealed by Statute Law Revision Act 1963 (c. 30))
East India Company's Service Act 1823 (repealed)	4 Geo. 4. c. 81	18 July 1823
An Act to consolidate and amend the Laws for punishing Mutiny and Desertion of Officers and Soldiers in the Service of the East India Company; and to authorize Soldiers and Sailors in the East Indies to send and receive Letters at a reduced Rate of Postage. (Repealed by Mutiny, East Indies Act 1840 (3 & 4 Vict. c. 37))
Temporary Removal of Convicts Act 1823 (repealed)	4 Geo. 4. c. 82	18 July 1823
An Act to authorize for One Year, and from thence to the End of the then next Session of Parliament, the temporary Removal of Convicts from the General Penitentiary. (Repealed by Statute Law Revision Act 1873 (36 & 37 Vict. c. 91))
Factor Act 1823 (repealed)	4 Geo. 4. c. 83	18 July 1823
An Act for the better Protection of the Property of Merchants and others, who may hereafter enter into Contracts or Agreements in relation to Goods, Wares or Merchandizes intrusted to Factors or Agents. (Repealed by Factors Act 1889 (52 & 53 Vict. c. 45))
Passenger Vessels Act 1823 (repealed)	4 Geo. 4. c. 84	18 July 1823
An Act to repeal the Laws for regulating Vessels carrying Passengers from the United Kingdom to Foreign Parts, and to make other Provisions in lieu thereof. (Repealed by Customs Law Repeal Act 1825 (6 Geo. 4. c. 105))
Process in Courts of Law, etc. (Scotland) Act 1823 (repealed)	4 Geo. 4. c. 85	18 July 1823
An Act for empowering Commissioners to be appointed by His Majesty, to enquire into the Forms of Process in the Courts of Law in Scotland, and the Course of Appeals from the Court of Sessions to the House of Lords. (Repealed by Statute Law Revision Act 1873 (36 & 37 Vict. c. 91))
Church of Ireland Act 1823 (repealed)	4 Geo. 4. c. 86	18 July 1823
An Act to amend the Laws for collecting Church Rates, and Money advanced by the Trustees and Commissioners of the First Fruits of Ecclesiastical Benefices, and for the Improvement of Church Lands, in Ireland. (Repealed by Statute Law Revision Act 1873 (36 & 37 Vict. c. 91))
Unlawful Oaths (Ireland) Act 1823 or the Unlawful Oaths Act 1823 (repealed)	4 Geo. 4. c. 87	18 July 1823
An Act to amend and render more effectual the Provisions of an Act made in the Fiftieth Year of His late Majesty’s Reign, (Note: Unlawful Oaths (Ireland) Act 1810 (50 Geo. 3. c. 102)) for preventing the administering and taking unlawful Oaths in Ireland. (Repealed by Statute Law Revision Act 1873 (36 & 37 Vict. c. 91), Statute Law Revision Act 1888 (51 & 52 Vict. c. 3), Statute Law Revision (No. 2) Act 1890 (53 & 54 Vict. c. 51), Statute Law Revision Act 1894 (57 & 58 Vict. c. 56) and Statute Law Revision Act 1948 (11 & 12 Geo. 6. c. 62), and for Northern Ireland by Administration of Justice Act (Northern Ireland) 1954 (c. 9 (N.I.)) and Statute Law Revision Act (Northern Ireland) 1954 (c. 35 (N.I.)); residue by Criminal Justice (Miscellaneous Provisions) Act (Northern Ireland) 1968 (c. 28 (N.I.)))
Passenger Vessels (No. 2) Act 1823 (repealed)	4 Geo. 4. c. 88	18 July 1823
An Act for regulating Vessels carrying Passengers between Great Britain and Ireland. (Repealed by Merchant Shipping Repeal Act 1854 (17 & 18 Vict. c. 120))
Law Costs (Ireland) Act 1823 (repealed)	4 Geo. 4. c. 89	18 July 1823
An Act to limit and regulate the Expence of certain Proceedings in the Courts of Justice in Ireland in the Particulars therein mentioned. (Repealed by Judicature (Northern Ireland) Act 1978 (c. 23))
Linen, etc., Manufactures Act 1823 (repealed)	4 Geo. 4. c. 90	18 July 1823
An Act to regulate the Linen and Hempen Manufactures of Ireland. (Repealed by Linen Manufacturers (Ireland) Act 1825 (6 Geo. 4. c. 122))
Marriages Confirmation Act 1823 (repealed)	4 Geo. 4. c. 91	18 July 1823
An Act to relieve His Majesty's Subjects from all Doubt concerning the Validity of certain Marriages solemnized abroad. (Repealed by Foreign Marriage Act 1892 (55 & 56 Vict. c. 23))
Annuity to Lord St. Vincent Act 1823 (repealed)	4 Geo. 4. c. 92	18 July 1823
An Act for extending the Annuity granted to Earl Saint Vincent to the present Viscount Saint Vincent, and the next Person to whom the Title of Viscount Saint Vincent shall descend. (Repealed by Statute Law Revision Act 1953 (2 & 3 Eliz. 2. c. 5))
Division of County of Cork Act 1823 (repealed)	4 Geo. 4. c. 93	18 July 1823
An Act to divide the County of Cork, for the Purpose of holding additional General Sessions therein. (Repealed by Civil Bill Courts (Ireland) Act 1851 (14 & 15 Vict. c. 57))
Duties on Spirits Act 1823 or the Excise Act 1823 or the Walsh Act (repealed)	4 Geo. 4. c. 94	18 July 1823
An Act to grant certain Duties of Excise upon Spirits distilled from Corn or Grain in Scotland and Ireland, and upon Licences for Stills for making such Spirits; and to provide for the better collecting and securing such Duties, and for the warehousing of such Spirits without Payment of Duty. (Repealed by Spirits Act 1880 (43 & 44 Vict. c. 24))
Turnpike Roads Act 1823 (repealed)	4 Geo. 4. c. 95	19 July 1823
An Act to explain and amend an Act, passed in the Third Year of the Reign of His present Majesty, to amend the general Laws now in being for regulating Turnpike Roads in that Part of Great Britain called England. (Repealed by Statute Law (Repeals) Act 1981 (c. 19))
Justice (New South Wales) Act 1823 or the New South Wales Jurisdiction Act 1823 (repealed)	4 Geo. 4. c. 96	19 July 1823
An Act to provide, until the First Day of July One thousand eight hundred and twenty-seven, and until the End of the next Session of Parliament, for the better Administration of Justice in New South Wales and Van Diemen's Land, and for the more effectual Government thereof and for other Purposes relating thereto. (Repealed by Australian Courts Act 1828 (9 Geo. 4. c. 83))
Commissary Courts (Scotland) Act 1823 (repealed)	4 Geo. 4. c. 97	19 July 1823
An Act for the Regulation of the Court of the Commissaries of Edinburgh; and for altering and regulating the Jurisdiction of Inferior Commissaries in Scotland. (Repealed by Statute Law Revision Act 1890 (53 & 54 Vict. c. 33) and Statute Law Revision Act 1950 (14 Geo. 6. c. 6))
Confirmation of Executors (Scotland) Act 1823	4 Geo. 4. c. 98	19 July 1823
An Act for the better granting of Confirmations in Scotland.
Composition for Tithes (Ireland) Act 1823 or the Tithe Composition Act 1823 (repealed)	4 Geo. 4. c. 99	19 July 1823
An Act to provide for the establishing of Compositions for Tithes in Ireland for a limited Time. (Repealed by Statute Law Revision Act 1873 (36 & 37 Vict. c. 91))
Appropriation Act 1823 (repealed)	4 Geo. 4. c. 100	19 July 1823
An Act for raising the Sum of Fourteen millions seven hundred thousand Pounds by Exchequer Bills; for applying a certain Sum of Money for the Service of the Year One thousand eight hundred and twenty three; and for further appropriating the Supplies granted in this Session of Parliament. (Repealed by Statute Law Revision Act 1873 (36 & 37 Vict. c. 91))

=== Local acts ===
Short title	Citation	Royal assent
Long title
Haw Passage (Gloucestershire) Severn Bridge and Roads Act 1823 (repealed)	4 Geo. 4. c. i	19 March 1823
An Act for building a Bridge over the River Severn, at or near the Haw Passage, in the County of Gloucester, and for making convenient Roads thereto. (Repealed by Haw Bridge Act 1852 (15 & 16 Vict. c. lix))
Tewkesbury Severn Bridge and Roads Act 1823	4 Geo. 4. c. ii	24 March 1823
An Act for building a Bridge over the River Severn, at or near to the Mythe Hill, within the Parish and near to the Town of Tewkesbury in the County of Gloucester, to the opposite Side of the said River, in the Parish of Bushley in the County of Worcester; and for making convenient Roads and Avenues to communicate with such Bridge, within the Counties of Gloucester and Worcester.
Darlington Improvement Act 1823	4 Geo. 4. c. iii	24 March 1823
An Act for Lighting, Cleansing, Watching and otherwise improving the Town and Borough of Darlington, in the County of Durham.
Portman Square Improvement Act 1823	4 Geo. 4. c. iv	24 March 1823
An Act to amend and enlarge the Powers and Provisions of an Act of His late Majesty King George the Third, (Note: Portman Square (Improvement) Act 1782 (22 Geo. 3. c. 85)) for the Improvement of Portman Square, within the Parish of Saint Mary-le-bone, in the County of Middlesex.
Plymouth Gas Act 1823	4 Geo. 4. c. v	24 March 1823
An Act for Lighting with Gas the Town and Borough of Plymouth, and Places adjacent, in the County of Devon.
Saltash Roads Act 1823 (repealed)	4 Geo. 4. c. vi	24 March 1823
An Act for more effectually amending, improving and keeping in Repair, several Roads in the Counties of Cornwall and Devon, leading to the Borough of Saltash, in the County of Cornwall. (Repealed by Saltash Roads Act 1833 (3 & 4 Will. 4. c. v))
Lincoln Heath and Peterborough and Bourne and Spalding Roads Amendment Act 1823	4 Geo. 4. c. vii	24 March 1823
An Act to rectify a Mistake in an Act passed in the Third Year of the Reign of His present Majesty, (Note: Lincoln Heath and Peterborough and Bourn and Spalding Roads Act 1822 (3 Geo. 4. c. lxvi)) for more effectually improving the Roads leading from the East Side of Lincoln Heath to the City of Peterborough, and several other Roads therein mentioned, in the Counties of Northampton and Lincoln; and for making a new Branch of Road to communicate with the said Roads, from Bourn to Spalding in the said County of Lincoln.
Peterborough and Wellingborough Road Act 1823 (repealed)	4 Geo. 4. c. viii	26 March 1823
An Act for repairing and amending the Road from the City of Peterborough through Oundle and Thrapston to Wellingborough, in the County of Northampton, and several other Roads near or adjoining thereto. (Repealed by Peterborough and Wellingborough Turnpike Road Act 1855 (18 & 19 Vict. c. cvii))
Hayling Bridge and Causeway Act 1823	4 Geo. 4. c. ix	2 May 1823
An Act for building a Bridge and making a Causeway from Langstone in the Parish of Havant, in the County of Southampton, to Hayling Island in the Parish of Hayling North, in the said County, at or near a certain House there, called The Ferry House; and for forming and making proper Roads, Approaches or Avenues thereto.
Lary Bridge Act 1823 (repealed)	4 Geo. 4. c. x	2 May 1823
An Act for erecting a Bridge over the Water of Lary, from Pomphlet Point, to or near to Great Prince Rock, in the County of Devon. (Repealed by Plymouth City Council Act 1987 (c. iv))
Forfar County Offices Act 1823	4 Geo. 4. c. xi	2 May 1823
An Act for erecting and maintaining a new Court Room, Record Rooms and other Offices, for the County of Forfar,
Uckfield and Eastbourne, and Horsebridge and Cross in Hand Roads Act 1823	4 Geo. 4. c. xii	2 May 1823
An Act for more effectually making, repairing and improving the Roads from Union Point near Uckfield to the Sea Houses in Eastbourne, and from Horsebridge to Cross in Hand, all in the County of Sussex.
Road from Preston to Garstang Act 1823 (repealed)	4 Geo. 4. c. xiii	2 May 1823
An Act for more effectually repairing the Road from Preston to Garstang in the County of Lancaster. (Repealed by Preston and Garstang Turnpike Road Act 1852 (15 & 16 Vict. c. cxx))
Stroud and Bisley Turnpike Road Act 1823 (repealed)	4 Geo. 4. c. xiv	2 May 1823
An Act for making and maintaining a Turnpike Road from Stroud to Bisley, in the County of Gloucester. (Repealed by Stroud and Bisley Road Act 1852 (15 & 16 Vict. c. lxxxvii))
Stockbridge, Winchester and Southampton Roads Act 1823	4 Geo. 4. c. xv	2 May 1823
An Act for repairing and improving the Roads from the Town of Stockbridge to the City of Winchester, and from the said City of Winchester to the Top of Stephen's Castle Down, near the Town of Bishop's Waltham, in the County of Southampton, and from the said City of Winchester through Otterborne to Bar Gate, in the Town and County of the Town of Southampton, and certain Roads adjoining thereto.
Road from Leeds to Wortley Act 1823 (repealed)	4 Geo. 4. c. xvi	2 May 1823
An Act for making and maintaining a Turnpike Road from and out of the Road leading from Quebec in Leeds, to Homefield Lane End in Wortley, to communicate with the Road leading from Huddersfield to Birstall, at Smithie's Lane, in the West Riding of the County of York. (Repealed by Road from Leeds to Wortley Act 1831 (1 Will. 4. c. xxix))
Newton Abbott and Torquay Roads Act 1823 (repealed)	4 Geo. 4. c. xvii	2 May 1823
An Act for more effectually making and repairing the Roads between Newton Abbott and Brixham, Kingswear and Dartmouth, Shaldon and Torquay, and several other Roads communicating therewith, in the County of Devon. (Repealed by Newton Abbott and Torquay Road Act 1825 (6 Geo. 4. c. lxxxviii))
Edinburgh and Glasgow Union Canal Company Act 1823	4 Geo. 4. c. xviii	12 May 1823
An Act to enable the Edinburgh and Glasgow Union Canal Company to borrow a further Sum of Money.
Bridport Harbour Act 1823 (repealed)	4 Geo. 4. c. xix	12 May 1823
An Act for the Improvement, more effectual Security and Maintenance of the Harbour of Bridport in the County of Dorset. (Repealed by Pier and Harbour Orders Confirmation (No. 2) Act 1921 (11 & 12 Geo. 5. c. lxvii))
Scarborough Harbour Act 1823	4 Geo. 4. c. xx	12 May 1823
An Act for amending an Act of the Third Year of His present Majesty, (Note: Scarborough Harbour Act 1822 (3 Geo. 4. c. xxii)) for continuing and altering Six former Acts of their late Majesties King George the Second (Note: Scarborough Harbour Act 1731 (5 Geo. 2. c. 11)) (Note: Scarborough Harbour Act 1751 (25 Geo. 2. c. 44)) and King George the Third, (Note: Scarborough Pier Act 1763 (3 Geo. 3. c. 42)) (Note: Scarborough Pier Act 1778 (18 Geo. 3. c. 20)) (Note: Scarborough Harbour Act 1801 (41 Geo. 3. (U.K.) c. lxix)) (Note: Scarborough Harbour Act 1806 (46 Geo. 3. c. xxxiii)) for enlarging the Piers and Harbour of Scarborough, in the County of York.
St. Matthew's Bethnal Green Parish Officers Act 1823 (repealed)	4 Geo. 4. c. xxi	12 May 1823
An Act for appointing Select Vestrymen, Governors and Directors of the Poor of the Parish of Saint Matthew Bethnal Green, in the County of Middlesex; and for altering and amending Two Acts passed in the Thirteenth (Note: Bethnal Green (Poor Relief) Act 1772 (13 Geo. 3. c. 53)) and Fifty third (Note: Bethnal Green Improvement Act 1813 (53 Geo. 3. c. cxiii)) Years of His late Majesty King George the Third, relating to the same. (Repealed by London Government (Borough of Bethnal Green) Order in Council 1901 (SR&O 1901/212))
Sharples and Hoghton Turnpike Road (Lancashire) Act 1823 (repealed)	4 Geo. 4. c. xxii	12 May 1823
An Act for more effectually repairing the Road leading from the Bolton and Blackburn Road in Sharples, to the Blackburn and Preston Road in Hoghton, in the County of Lancaster, called the Sharples and Hoghton Turnpike Road. (Repealed by Sharples and Hoghton Road Act 1852 (15 & 16 Vict. c. lxxiv))
Cockermouth and Workington Road Act 1823 (repealed)	4 Geo. 4. c. xxiii	12 May 1823
An Act for more effectually amending, improving and keeping in Repair the Road between the Towns of Cockermouth and Workington, in the County of Cumberland. (Repealed by Cockermouth and Workington Road Act 1832 (2 & 3 Will. 4. c. xxix))
Road from Garstang to Lancaster and Heiring Syke Act 1823 (repealed)	4 Geo. 4. c. xxiv	12 May 1823
An Act for more effectually repairing and improving the Road from the Town of Garstang to the Town of Lancaster, and from thence to a Place called Heiring Syke, and the Road from the Guide Post in the Township of Slyne with Hest to Hest Bank, all in the County Palatine of Lancaster. (Repealed by Garstang and Heiring Syke Turnpike Road Act 1850 (13 & 14 Vict. c. lxxi))
Tenbury and Hereford Roads Act 1823	4 Geo. 4. c. xxv	12 May 1823
An Act for more effectually amending, widening and keeping in Repair several Roads in and near to the Town of Tenbury, in the Counties of Salop, Worcester and Hereford, and the Roads leading from the Knowle Gate to the Turnpike Road on the Clee Hill, and from Kyre Mill to the Turnpike Road leading from Bromyard to Tenbury.
Highways and Bridges in Wigtownshire Act 1823 (repealed)	4 Geo. 4. c. xxvi	12 May 1823
An Act for continuing the Term and Powers of an Act passed in the Forty second Year of the Reign of His late Majesty King George the Third, (Note: Highways and Bridges in Wigtownshire Act 1802 (42 Geo. 3. c. lv)) for repealing an Act (Note: Wigtown Roads Act 1778 (18 Geo. 3. c. 7)) for repairing the Highways and Bridges in the County of Wigtown, and for other Purposes in the said Act mentioned. (Repealed by Wigtownshire Roads Act 1865 (28 & 29 Vict. c. ccxii))
Offington Corner and West Grinstead Park Road Act 1823	4 Geo. 4. c. xxvii	12 May 1823
An Act for amending the Road from Offington Corner in the Parishes of Broadwater and West Tarring, or one of them, in the County of Sussex, by Findon, Washington Hill Rock, and Ashington Common, to Dial Post, and from thence by Nep Castle, to the Steyning Turnpike Road at West Grinsted Park in the said County; and for making a new Branch of Road to communicate therewith.
Roads from Chesterfield to Matlock Bridge Act 1823	4 Geo. 4. c. xxviii	12 May 1823
An Act for more effectually repairing the Road leading from the Turnpike Road near the West End of the Town of Chesterfield to Matlock Bridge; and also the Road leading out of the said Road over Darley Bridge to Cross Green; and also the Road leading out of the last mentioned Road to the Turnpike Road near Rowesley Bridge, all in the County of Derby.
Somerham Brook and Box (Wiltshire) Road Act 1823	4 Geo. 4. c. xxix	12 May 1823
An Act for amending the Road from the Devizes Turnpike Road, at or near Somerham Brook, through Melksham, to the Horse and Jockey in the Parish of Box, in the County of Wilts, and certain other Roads leading out of the said Road, all in the said County.
Darlaston Turnpike Act 1823 or the Roads from Darlaston Bridge (Staffordshire) Act 1823 (repealed)	4 Geo. 4. c. xxx	12 May 1823
An Act for improving the Roads from Darlaston Bridge, through Newcastle under Lyme, to Butt Lane and Linley Lane, and from the Black Lion to Shelton Wharf, all in the County of Stafford. (Repealed by Darlaston Turnpike Act 1837 (7 Will. 4 & 1 Vict. c. xl))
Road from Otley to Skipton Act 1823 (repealed)	4 Geo. 4. c. xxxi	12 May 1823
An Act for repairing and improving the Road from Otley to Skipton in the County of York. (Repealed by Otley and Skipton Road Act 1857 (20 & 21 Vict. c. cxxxi))
Worcester Severn Bridge Act 1823	4 Geo. 4. c. xxxii	23 May 1823
An Act for altering and enlarging the Powers of Two Acts of the Ninth (Note: Worcester Bridge Act 1769 (9 Geo. 3. c. 84)) and Nineteenth (Note: Worcester Bridge Act 1779 (19 Geo. 3. c. 42)) Years of His late Majesty King George the Third, for building and completing a Bridge at Worcester over the River Severn, and for opening convenient Avenues thereto.
Stockton and Darlington Railway Act 1823 (repealed)	4 Geo. 4. c. xxxiii	23 May 1823
An Act to enable the Stockton and Darlington Railway Company to vary and alter the Line of their Railway, and also the Line or Lines of some of the Branches therefrom, and to make, an additional Branch therefrom, and for altering and enlarging the Powers of the Act (Note: Stockton and Darlington Railway Act 1821 (1 & 2 Geo. 4. c. xliv)) passed for making and maintaining the said Railway. (Repealed by Stockton and Darlington Railway (Consolidation of Acts, Increase of Capital and Purchase of Middlesbrough Dock) Act 1849 (c.liv))
Borough Market (Southwark) Act 1823	4 Geo. 4. c. xxxiv	23 May 1823
An Act to alter and amend Two several Acts passed in the Twenty eighth (Note: Southwark Market (No. 2) Act 1755 (28 Geo. 2. c. 23)) and Thirtieth (Note: Southwark Market Act 1757 (30 Geo. 2. c. 31)) Years of His Majesty King George the Second, for the. Purpose of enabling the Churchwardens, Overseers and Inhabitants of the Parish of Saint Saviour in the Borough of Southwark in the County of Surrey, to hold a Market within the said Parish.
Knaresborough and Tentergate Improvement Act 1823	4 Geo. 4. c. xxxv	23 May 1823
An Act for paving, lighting, watching, cleansing and improving the Town of Knaresbrough in the West Riding of the County of York, and that Part of the Township of Scriven with Tentergate which adjoins the said Town, and is called Tentergate.
Rochdale Gas Act 1823 (repealed)	4 Geo. 4. c. xxxvi	23 May 1823
An Act for lighting with Gas the Town of Rochdale, and the Neighbourhood thereof, within the Parish of Rochdale in the County Palatine of Lancaster. (Repealed by Rochdale Gas Act 1844 (7 & 8 Vict. c. xii))
Belfast Gas Act 1823 (repealed)	4 Geo. 4. c. xxxvii	23 May 1823
An Act for lighting with Gas the Town of Belfast, and the Suburbs thereof. (Repealed by Belfast Gas Act 1852 (15 & 16 Vict. c. xv))
Dublin Gas Act 1823 (repealed)	4 Geo. 4. c. xxxviii	23 May 1823
An Act for establishing an additional Company (Note: The Hibernian Gas Light Company.) for lighting the City and Suburbs of Dublin with Gas. (Repealed by United General Gaslight Company's Act 1866 (29 & 30 Vict. c. cxcix))
Liverpool Gas Act 1823 (repealed)	4 Geo. 4. c. xxxix	23 May 1823
An Act for lighting with Oil Gas the Town of Liverpool and certain Places adjacent thereto. (Repealed by Liverpool United Gaslight Company's Act 1848 (11 & 12 Vict. c. xxxviii))
Maidstone Gas Act 1823 (repealed)	4 Geo. 4. c. xl	23 May 1823
An Act for lighting with Gas the public Streets, Lanes, Passages and Places, and the Houses, Warehouses and other Buildings, within the King's Town and Parish of Maidstone in the County of Kent. (Repealed by Maidstone Gasworks Act 1858 (21 & 22 Vict. c. xxxvi))
Alfreton and Derby Road Act 1823	4 Geo. 4. c. xli	23 May 1823
An Act for more effectually repairing the Road from Alfreton in the County of Derby to the Town of Derby.
Horsham to Crawley Road Act 1823	4 Geo. 4. c. xlii	23 May 1823
An Act for making and maintaining a Turnpike Road from Horsham in the County of Sussex, by Bewbush, to the Town of Crawley in the said County.
Mold and Wrexham Turnpike Road and Branches Act 1823	4 Geo. 4. c. xliii	23 May 1823
An Act for making and maintaining a Turnpike Road from the Turnpike Road between the Town of Mold in the County of Flint, and the Town of Wrexham in the County of Denbigh, to the Turnpike Road between the Town of Ruthin in the said County of Denbigh, and the Town of Wrexham aforesaid, and also Two several Branches of Road therefrom.
East Teignmouth and Exminster Turnpike Road Act 1823 (repealed)	4 Geo. 4. c. xliv	23 May 1823
An Act for making and maintaining a Turnpike Road from East Teignmouth, through Dawlish, Starcross and Kenton, to communicate with the Exeter Turnpike Road in the Parish of Exminster, all in the County of Devon. (Repealed by Teignmouth and Dawlish and Exeter Roads Act 1825 (6 Geo. 4. c. xcix))
Wrexham and Barnhill Road and Branch Act 1823	4 Geo. 4. c. xlv	23 May 1823
An Act for more effectually amending the Road from Wrexham in the County of Denbigh, to Barnhill in the County of Chester; and for making and keeping in Repair the Road branching out of the said Road at Pwll-y-rhwyd to the Borough of Holt in the said County of Denbigh.
Road from the Botley Turnpike Road Act 1823 (repealed)	4 Geo. 4. c. xlvi	23 May 1823
An Act for more effectually repairing the Road leading from the Botley Turnpike Road on Curdridge Common in the Parish of Bishops Waltham, to the Gosport Turnpike Road at or near Filmer Hill in the Parish of Westmeon, with a Branch from the said Road on Corhampton Down, to the Village of Corhampton, all in the County of Southampton. (Repealed by London and Southampton Turnpike Road through Bishops Waltham Act 1852 (15 & 16 Vict. c. xxxviii))
Three Districts of Road in Staffordshire and Salop Act 1823	4 Geo. 4. c. xlvii	23 May 1823
An Act for repairing and improving divers Roads in the Counties of Stafford and Salop, comprised in Three Districts called the Eccleshall, Newport and Watling Street District, the Newcastle and Eccleshall District, and the Hilton and Honnington District.
Roads from Toller Lane near Bradford and from the Two Laws Act 1823	4 Geo. 4. c. xlviii	23 May 1823
An Act for more effectually repairing, widening and improving the Roads from the West End of Toller Lane near Bradford through Haworth to Blue Bell near Colne, and from the Two Laws to Kighley, in the Counties of York and Lancaster.
Keighley to Kirkby Road (Yorkshire District) Act 1823 (repealed)	4 Geo. 4. c. xlix	23 May 1823
An Act for more effectually repairing and improving the Yorkshire District of the Road from Keighley in the West Riding of the County of York to Kirkby in Kendal in the County of Westmoreland, and for making several Diversions therefrom, within the said West Riding of the County of York. (Repealed by Keighley and Kendal Turnpike Road (Yorkshire District) Act 1855 (18 & 19 Vict. c. cliv))
Melton Mowbray and Grantham Road Act 1823	4 Geo. 4. c. l	23 May 1823
An Act for repairing the Road from Sage Cross in the Town of Melton Mowbray, in the County of Leicester, to the Town of Grantham, in the County of Lincoln.
Newcastle-under-Lyme Roads Act 1823 (repealed)	4 Geo. 4. c. li	23 May 1823
An Act for improving and maintaining in repair divers Roads in the County of Stafford, leading from Newcastle under Lyme to Blyth Marshy from Cliff Bank to Snape Marsh, from Lower Lane to Hem Heath, and from Shelton to Newcastle under Lyme. (Repealed by Newcastle-under-Lyme Roads Act 1840 (3 & 4 Vict. c. cxvi))
Liskeard Roads Act 1823 (repealed)	4 Geo. 4. c. lii	23 May 1823
An Act for more effectually making, repairing and improving certain Roads leading to and from Liskeard, and certain other Roads therein mentioned, in the Counties of Cornwall and Devon. (Repealed by Liskeard Roads Act 1826 (7 Geo. 4. c. lxxxiv))
Roads through Ilminster Act 1823 (repealed)	4 Geo. 4. c. liii	23 May 1823
An Act for making amending widening and keeping in repair certain Roads passing through or near the Town of Ilminster, in the County of Somerset. (Repealed by Ilminster Roads Act 1828 (9 Geo. 4. c. l))
Bradford and Huddersfield Road and Branches Act 1823 (repealed)	4 Geo. 4. c. liv	23 May 1823
An Act for making and maintaining a Turnpike Road from Wibsey Low Moor, near Bradford, through Brighouse to Huddersfield, with Three Diversions or Branches from such Road, in the West Riding of the County of York. (Repealed by Bradford and Huddersfield Roads Act 1830 (11 Geo. 4 & 1 Will. 4. c. lxxxvii))
Wisbech and King's Lynn Roads Act 1823 (repealed)	4 Geo. 4. c. lv	23 May 1823
An Act for more effectually amending the Roads from the Little Bridge over the End of the Drain next Wisbeach River, lying between Roper's Fields and the Bell Inn in Wisbeach in the Isle of Ely, to the West End of Long Bridge in South Lynn, in the Borough of King's Lynn, in the County of Norfolk; and for amending, improving and keeping in Repair certain other Roads therein mentioned, in the said County of Norfolk. (Repealed by Statute Law (Repeals) Act 2008 (c. 12))
Road from Bridgeford to Kettering Act 1823	4 Geo. 4. c. lvi	23 May 1823
An Act for continuing the Term and Powers of an Act of His late Majesty's Reign, (Note: Road from Bridgford to Kettering Act 1801 (41 Geo. 3. (U.K.) c. cxvii)) for repairing the Road from the North End of Bridgford Lane, in the County of Nottingham, to the Bowling Green at Kettering, in the County of Northampton.
Road from Canterbury to Barham Act 1823	4 Geo. 4. c. lvii	23 May 1823
An Act for more effectually repairing the Road from the City of Canterbury to the Dover Turnpike Road, in the Parish of Barham in the County of Kent; and for lighting, watering and watching Part of the said Road, leading into the said City of Canterbury.
Greenfield and Shepley Lane Head Road (Yorkshire, West Riding) Act 1823 (repealed)	4 Geo. 4. c. lviii	23 May 1823
An Act for making and maintaining a Turnpike Road from Holehouse or Riding, near Greenfield in Saddleworth, to join the Stayley Turnpike Road, and also to join the Halifax and Sheffield Turnpike Road, all in the West Riding of the County of York. (Repealed by Greenfield and Shepley Lane Head Road Act 1852 (15 & 16 Vict. c. ci))
Uttoxeter District of Roads Act 1823 (repealed)	4 Geo. 4. c. lix	23 May 1823
An Act for more effectually amending and keeping in repair the Roads from the Town of Uttoxeter to the Town of Newcastle under Lyme in the County of Stafford, so far as relates to the Uttoxeter District of the said Roads; and for making certain new Pieces of Road to communicate therewith, all in the said County of Stafford. (Repealed by Uttoxeter and Blyth Marsh Turnpike Road Act 1856 (19 & 20 Vict. c. cxxvii))
Road from Hinckley to Lutterworth Act 1823	4 Geo. 4. c. lx	23 May 1823
An Act for repairing and amending the Road from Castle Street at the End of the Town of Hinckley in the County of Leicester, to the End of the Town of Lutterworth in the same County.
Road from Market Harborough to Coventry Act 1823 (repealed)	4 Geo. 4. c. lxi	23 May 1823
An Act for repairing and amending the Road from the Town of Market Harborough in the County of Leicester to the City of Coventry. (Repealed by Market Harborough and Coventry Road Act 1844 (7 & 8 Vict. c. lxxiii))
Somerton District of Roads (Somerset) Act 1823	4 Geo. 4. c. lxii	23 May 1823
An Act for more effectually repairing the Roads from Dyed Way to Somerton, and from Gawbridge to Tintinhull Fords, and from a Stream of Water called Ford to Cartgate in Martock, and other Roads therein mentioned, in the County of Somerset.
Road from Rugby to Kilworth Act 1823	4 Geo. 4. c. lxiii	23 May 1823
An Act for repairing and widening the Road from Rugby in the County of Warwick, to the Turnpike Road from Lutterworth to Market Harborough in the Counties of Leicester and Northampton.
Sparrows Herne (Hertfordshire) and Walton (Buckinghamshire) Road Act 1823 (repealed)	4 Geo. 4. c. lxiv	23 May 1823
An Act for more effectually repairing and improving the Road from the South End of Sparrows Herne on Bushey Heath, through the Market Towns of Watford, Berkhamsted Saint Peter, and Tring, in the County of Hertford, by Pettipher's Elms, to the Turnpike Road at Walton, near Aylesbury, in the County of Buckingham. (Repealed by Bushey Heath to Aylesbury Road Act 1845 (8 & 9 Vict. c. ix))
Staplecross (Sussex) Roads Act 1823	4 Geo. 4. c. lxv	23 May 1823
An Act for more effectually repairing the Roads from Staplecross to Hornscross, and from Hornscross to the Turnpike Road near Brickwall House in the Parish of Northiam, and from Hornscross to the Turnpike Road near the Windmill in the Parish of Beckley, and from Staplecross to Bodiam Bridge, and to the Turnpike Road at Silver Hill, all in the County of Sussex.
Roads from Barnsley Common and from Barugh (Yorkshire) Act 1823 (repealed)	4 Geo. 4. c. lxvi	23 May 1823
An Act for repairing and maintaining the Roads from Barnsley Common to Grange Moor and White Cross; and from the Guide Post in Barugh over Barugh Brook into the Township of Cawthorne, all in the County of York. (Repealed by Barnsley and Grange Moor Road Act 1825 (6 Geo. 4. c. cli))
Road from Kettering to Newport Pagnell Act 1823 (repealed)	4 Geo. 4. c. lxvii	23 May 1823
An Act for more effectually amending, repairing and keeping in repair the Road from the Toll Gate in the Parish of Kettering, through Wellingborough in the County of Northampton, and through Olney, over Sherrington Bridge, to Newport Pagnell in the County of Buckingham. (Repealed by Kettering and Newport Pagnell Turnpike Road Act 1856 (19 & 20 Vict. c. xxxvii))
St. Paul Shadwell Church and Churchyard Act 1823 (repealed)	4 Geo. 4. c. lxviii	30 May 1823
An Act for raising a further Sum of Money for carrying into Execution an Act passed in the Fifty seventh Year of His late Majesty King George the Third, intituled "An Act for rebuilding the Church and improving the Churchyard of the Parish of Saint Paul Shadwell in the County of Middlesex;" (Note: St. Paul Shadwell Church and Churchyard Act 1817 (57 Geo. 3. c. lxxii)) and for amending the said Act. (Repealed by London Government (Borough of Stepney) Order in Council 1901 (SR&O 1901/276))
Worcester Water Act 1823 (repealed)	4 Geo. 4. c. lxix	30 May 1823
An Act for better supplying the City of Worcester and the Liberties thereof with Water; and for more effectually paving, lighting, watching and otherwise improving the said City. (Repealed by Local Government Board's Provisional Order Confirmation (No. 19) Act 1914 (4 & 5 Geo. 5. c. clxxxiv))
Greenwich Improvement Act 1823 (repealed)	4 Geo. 4. c. lxx	30 May 1823
An Act for lighting and watching the Parish and Town of Greenwich in the County of Kent, and removing and preventing Nuisances therein. (Repealed by London Government (Borough of Greenwich) Order in Council 1901 (SR&O 1901/267))
Gorbals Improvement Act 1823 (repealed)	4 Geo. 4. c. lxxi	30 May 1823
An Act for regulating the Police of the Barony of Gorbals in the County of Lanark; paving, cleansing and lighting the Streets; erecting a Bridewell; and other Purposes relating thereto. (Repealed by Gorbals Improvement Act 1843 (6 & 7 Vict. c. xciii))
Paisley Gas Act 1823 (repealed)	4 Geo. 4. c. lxxii	30 May 1823
An Act for lighting the Town and Burgh of Paisley, and Suburbs and Places adjacent, with Gas, and for other Purposes relating thereto. (Repealed by Paisley Gaslight Act 1845 (8 & 9 Vict. c. xviii))
Woolwich Gas Act 1823	4 Geo. 4. c. lxxiii	30 May 1823
An Act for lighting with Gas the Town of Woolwich in the County of Kent.
York Gas Act 1823 (repealed)	4 Geo. 4. c. lxxiv	30 May 1823
An Act for lighting with Gas the City of York, and the Suburbs and Vicinity thereof. (Repealed by York Gas Act 1844 (7 & 8 Vict. c. lxxiv))
St. Mary Magdalen Bermondsey Improvement Act 1823 (repealed)	4 Geo. 4. c. lxxv	30 May 1823
An Act for lighting, watching and cleansing the Grange Road, and other Parts of the Parish of Saint Mary Magdalen, Bermondsey, in the County of Surrey. (Repealed by Bermondsey Improvement Act 1845 (8 & 9 Vict. c. clxxvii))
Glen and Welland Drainage Act 1823	4 Geo. 4. c. lxxvi	30 May 1823
An Act for explaining, amending and rendering more effectual an Act of His late Majesty, (Note: Kesteven and Holland Inclosures and Drainage Act 1801 (41 Geo. 3. (U.K.) c. cxxviii)) for draining certain Commons and Fens lying between the Rivers Glen and Welland in the County of Lincoln, and for increasing the Rates thereby authorized, and imposing additional Rates for more effectually draining the said Lands.
Wadsley and Langset Turnpike Road Extension Act 1823 (repealed)	4 Geo. 4. c. lxxvii	30 May 1823
An Act for more effectually repairing the Wadsley and Langset Turnpike Road, and extending the same in Two Lines to join the Huddersfield and Woodhead Turnpike Road, in the Town ships of Upperthong and Honley in the West Riding of the County of York. (Repealed by New Mill District Turnpike Road Act 1854 (17 & 18 Vict. c. xcvii))
Falmouth and Marazion Road Act 1823	4 Geo. 4. c. lxxviii	30 May 1823
An Act for continuing the Term and altering and enlarging the Powers of Three Acts, passed in the First, (Note: Falmouth and Marazion Road Act 1760 (1 Geo. 3. c. 32)) Twenty first (Note: Falmouth and Marazion Road Act 1781 (21 Geo. 3. c. 78)) and Forty second (Note: Road from Falmouth Act 1802 (42 Geo. 3. c. x)) Years of the Reign of His late Majesty, for amending and widening the Road leading from the Town of Falmouth in the County of Cornwall, through the Towns of Penryn, Helston and Marazion, and from thence to and over Marazion River and Bridge, and Two hundred Feet to the Westward of the said River and Bridge.
Road from Kingston-upon-Thames to Sheetbridge Act 1823 (repealed)	4 Geo. 4. c. lxxix	30 May 1823
An Act for better and more effectually improving and keeping in Repair the Road leading from the Town of Kingston-upon-Thames in the County of Surrey, to a Place called Sheetbridge, near Petersfield, in the County of Southampton. (Repealed by Kingston and Sheetbridge Road Act 1852 (15 & 16 Vict. c. cxxiii))
Road from Norwich to Fakenham Act 1823 (repealed)	4 Geo. 4. c. lxxx	30 May 1823
An Act for making and maintaining a Road from Norwich to Fakenham in the County of Norfolk. (Repealed by Norwich and Fakenham Road Act 1832 (2 & 3 Will. 4. c. lxiii))
Roads from Dover to Barham Downs and Sandgate Act 1823	4 Geo. 4. c. lxxxi	30 May 1823
An Act for amending and keeping in repair the Roads from Dover to Barham Downs, and from Dover to the Town of Folkestone, and from thence through the Parish of Folkestone to Sandgate in the County of Kent.
Tarporley and Weverham Road (Cheshire) Act 1823	4 Geo. 4. c. lxxxii	30 May 1823
An Act for improving and keeping in repair the Road from Tarporley in the County Palatine of Chester to the South East End of Acton Forge near Weverham in the same County.
Roads from Winchester and from Worthy Cow Down Act 1823	4 Geo. 4. c. lxxxiii	30 May 1823
An Act for amending and maintaining the Roads from the North Gate of the City of Winchester, over Worthy Cow Down, through Whitchurch and other Places, to Newtown River, and from Worthy Cow Down aforesaid, through Wherwell, to Andover in the County of Southampton.
Roads in Bermondsey, Rotherhithe and Deptford Act 1823 (repealed)	4 Geo. 4. c. lxxxiv	30 May 1823
An Act for more effectually repairing, amending and improving certain Roads in the several Parishes of Saint Mary Magdalen Bermondsey and Saint Mary at Rotherhithe in the County of Surrey, and Saint Paul Deptford and Saint Nicholas Deptford in the County of Kent. (Repealed by London Government (Borough of Deptford) Order in Council 1901 (SR&O 1901/214). London Government (Borough of Bermondsey) Order in Council 1901 (SR&O 1901/264). London Government (Borough of Hackney) Order in Council 1901 (SR&O 1901/268))
Road from Great Staughton to Lavendon Act 1823	4 Geo. 4. c. lxxxv	30 May 1823
An Act for more effectually repairing the Road from the South End of Brown's Lane in the Parish of Great Staughton in the County of Huntingdon to the Bedford Turnpike Road in the Parish of Lavendon in the County of Buckingham.
Road from Horsham to Epsom Act 1823 (repealed)	4 Geo. 4. c. lxxxvi	30 May 1823
An Act for repairing, widening and maintaining the Road leading from Horsham in the County of Sussex, through Dorking and Leatherhead, to Epsom in the County of Surrey, and from Capel to Stone Street at Ockley in the said County of Surrey. (Repealed by Horsham and Dorking Turnpike Road Act 1858 (21 & 22 Vict. c. xlix))
Trent and Mersey Navigation Act 1823 (repealed)	4 Geo. 4. c. lxxxvii	17 June 1823
An Act to enable the Company of Proprietors of the Navigation from the Trent to the Mersey to make an additional Tunnel through Harecastle Hill, in the County of Stafford, and an additional Reservoir in Knypersey Valley in the said County; and to amend and enlarge the Powers of the several Acts (Note: Trent and Mersey Canal Act 1766 (6 Geo. 3. c. 96)) (Note: Trent and Mersey Canal Act 1770 (10 Geo. 3. c. 102)) (Note: Trent and Mersey Canal Act 1775 (15 Geo. 3. c. 20)) (Note: Trent and Mersey Canal Act 1776 (16 Geo. 3. c. 32)) (Note: Trent and Mersey Canal Act 1783 (25 Geo. 3. c. 33)) (Note: Caldon Canal Act 1797 (37 Geo. 3. c. 36)) (Note: Trent and Mersey Canal Act 1797 (37 Geo. 3. c. 81)) (Note: Trent and Mersey Canal (Railways) Act 1802 (42 Geo. 3. c. xxv)) (Note: Trent and Mersey Canal Act 1809 (49 Geo. 3. c. lxxiii)) for making and maintaining the said Navigation, and the several Canals connected therewith. (Repealed by Trent and Mersey Canal Act 1831 (1 Will. 4. c. lv))
Tay Ferries Act 1823 (repealed)	4 Geo. 4. c. lxxxviii	17 June 1823
An Act to amend an Act of the last Session of Parliament (Note: Tay Ferries Act 1822 (3 Geo. 4. c. lxxvi)) for erecting and maintaining Ferries across the River Tay in the Counties of Fife and Forfar. (Repealed by Dundee Harbour and Tay Ferries Act 1873 (36 & 37 Vict. c. l))
Liverpool Parish Church and Cemeteries Act 1823 or the Liverpool Church Repealing Act 1823 (repealed)	4 Geo. 4. c. lxxxix	17 June 1823
An Act to repeal an Act passed in the Fifty fourth Year of His late Majesty, (Note: Liverpool Additional Church Act 1814 (54 Geo. 3. c. cxi)) for building a new Church within the Town and Parish of Liverpool in the County Palatine of Lancaster; to vest the said Church and the Ground thereunto belonging in the Mayor, Bailiffs and Burgesses of the Town of Liverpool; to authorize the Purchase of Land in the said Town to be appropriated to the Use of Public Cemeteries; and to restrict the Burial of Corpses in the present Cemeteries of the Parish Church and Parochial Chapel there. (Repealed by Liverpool and Wigan Churches Act 1904 (4 Edw. 7. c. c))
Halifax Improvement Act 1823 (repealed)	4 Geo. 4. c. xc	17 June 1823
An Act for paving, lighting, cleansing, watching and improving the Township of Halifax, and for supplying the same with Water. (Repealed by West Yorkshire Act 1980 (c. xiv))
Bermondsey Improvement Act 1823 (repealed)	4 Geo. 4. c. xci	17 June 1823
An Act for repairing, maintaining and improving the Highways and other public Places in the Parish of Saint Mary Magdalen Bermondsey in the County of Surrey. (Repealed by Bermondsey Improvement Act 1845 (8 & 9 Vict. c. clxxvii))
Mansfield Improvement Act 1823 (repealed)	4 Geo. 4. c. xcii	17 June 1823
An Act for improving, paving, lighting, cleansing and watching the Town of Mansfield in the County of Nottingham. (Repealed by Local Government Board's Provisional Orders Confirmation (No. 8) Act 1889 (52 & 53 Vict. c. lxi))
Skipton Water Act 1823 (repealed)	4 Geo. 4. c. xciii	17 June 1823
An Act for better supplying with Water the Town of Skipton in the West Riding of the County of York. (Repealed by Skipton Waterworks Act 1870 (33 & 34 Vict. c. cii))
Limerick Bridge and Floating Dock Act 1823	4 Geo. 4. c. xciv	17 June 1823
An Act for the Erection of a Bridge across the River Shannon, and of a Floating Dock to accommodate sharp Vessels frequenting the Port of Limerick.
Imperial Gas Light and Coke Company Act 1823 (repealed)	4 Geo. 4. c. xcv	17 June 1823
An Act to alter, amend and enlarge the Powers of an Act of His present Majesty's Reign, intituled "An Act to establish, an additional Company for lighting certain Parts of the Metropolis and Parts adjacent with Gas." (Note: Imperial Gas Light and Coke Company Act 1821 (1 & 2 Geo. 4. c. cxvii)) (Repealed by Imperial Gas Act 1854 (17 & 18 Vict. c. lv))
Northampton Gas Act 1823 (repealed)	4 Geo. 4. c. xcvi	17 June 1823
An Act to establish a Company for lighting with Gas the Town of Northampton. (Repealed by Northampton Gasworks Act 1858 (21 & 22 Vict. c. ciii))
Brighthelmstone Gas Act 1823 (repealed)	4 Geo. 4. c. xcvii	17 June 1823
An Act to amend and explain the Powers of an Act of His late Majesty, (Note: Brighthelmston Gas Act 1818 (58 Geo. 3. c. lxxxvii)) for lighting with Gas the Town of Brighthelmstone, (Note: Brighthelmstone is now known as Brighton.) and to raise a further Sum of Money for carrying the Purposes of the said Act into Execution. (Repealed by Brighton Gaslight Act 1848 (11 & 12 Vict. c. xl))
Middlesex Gas Act 1823 (repealed)	4 Geo. 4. c. xcviii	17 June 1823
An Act for lighting with Gas the several Parishes of Saint Botolph Aldgate and Saint Paul Shadwell, and certain Parts of the Parishes of Saint George in the East, otherwise Saint George Middlesex and Saint John of Wapping, and of the Hamlets of Mile end Old Town and Ratcliff in the County of Middlesex (Repealed by Ratcliff Gas Act 1855 (18 & 19 Vict. c. xii))
Dublin Gas (No. 2) Act 1823 (repealed)	4 Geo. 4. c. xcix	17 June 1823
An Act to enable the Company of Proprietors of the Dublin Gas Works to raise more Money for the further lighting the City and Suburbs of Dublin with Gas. (Repealed by United General Gaslight Company's Act 1866 (29 & 30 Vict. c. cxcix))
Mansfield Gas Act 1823 (repealed)	4 Geo. 4. c. c	17 June 1823
An Act for lighting the Town of Mansfield, in the County of Nottingham, with Gas. (Repealed by Mansfield Gas Act 1852 (15 & 16 Vict. c. i))
Stamford and St. Martin's Stamford Baron Gas Act 1823 (repealed)	4 Geo. 4. c. ci	17 June 1823
An Act to establish a Company for lighting the Borough of Stamford in the County of Lincoln, and Saint Martin's Stamford Baron in the County of Northampton, with Gas. (Repealed by Stamford and St. Martin Stamford Baron Gas Act 1892 (55 & 56 Vict. c. cxlvii))
Bristol and Clifton Gas Act 1823 (repealed)	4 Geo. 4. c. cii	17 June 1823
An Act for lighting with Oil Gas the City of Bristol and the Parish of Clifton in the County of Gloucester, and certain Parishes adjacent thereto. (Repealed by Bristol and Clifton Gaslight Act 1847 (10 & 11 Vict. c. xxvii))
Fen Drainage Act 1823	4 Geo. 4. c. ciii	17 June 1823
An Act to amend and render more effectual an Act passed in the Forty-seventh Year of the Reign of His late Majesty King George the Third, (Note: Isle of Ely (Mildenhall River) Drainage Act 1807 (47 Geo. 3 Sess. 2. c. lxxxiii)) for repealing several Acts therein mentioned, for draining certain Fen Lands in the Isle of Ely and Counties of Suffolk and Norfolk, near Mildenhall River, so far as relates to the Lands in the First District therein described, and for making better Provision for draining and preserving the said Lands.
Okehampton Roads Act 1823 (repealed)	4 Geo. 4. c. civ	17 June 1823
An Act for amending and improving the Roads leading to the Town of Oakhampton in the County of Devon. (Repealed by Okehampton Roads Act 1829 (10 Geo. 4. c. xviii))
Banbury, Brailes and Barcheston Road Act 1823 (repealed)	4 Geo. 4. c. cv	17 June 1823
An Act for amending, improving and keeping in Repair the Road leading from the Turnpike Road in the Horse Fair in the Town of Banbury in the County of Oxford, through Swalcliffe in the said County of Oxford, and through Brailes in the County of Warwick, to the Bridge crossing the River Stour in the Parish of Barcheston in the said County of Warwick. (Repealed by Statute Law (Repeals) Act 2013 (c. 2))
Middlesex and Essex Turnpike Roads Act 1823 (repealed)	4 Geo. 4. c. cvi	17 June 1823
An Act for more effectually repairing and improving the Roads leading from Whitechapel Church in the County of Middlesex, unto Passingford Bridge, and through and to the End of the several Parishes or Places of Shenfield and Woodford in the County of Essex, and for other Purposes relating thereto. (Repealed by Statute Law (Repeals) Act 2008 (c. 12))
Rochdale and Manchester Road Act 1823 (repealed)	4 Geo. 4. c. cvii	17 June 1823
An Act for amending the Road leading from the New Wall on the Parade, in Castleton in the Parish of Rochdale, through Middleton, to the Meer Stone in Great Heaton, and to the Town of Manchester, all in the County Palatine of Lancaster; for diverting certain Parts of the said Road. (Repealed by Castleton and Manchester Road Act 1843 (6 & 7 Vict. c. xci))
Beaconsfield and Stokenchurch Road Act 1823	4 Geo. 4. c. cviii	17 June 1823
An Act for more effectually repairing the Road leading from Beaconsfield in the County of Buckingham to Stoken Church in the County of Oxford.
Roads from Modbury through Plymouth Act 1823 (repealed)	4 Geo. 4. c. cix	17 June 1823
An Act for more effectually making and maintaining the Road from Modbury, through the Town of Plympton, to the North End of Lincotta Lane, and from Modbury to within Four hundred Yards of the Bridge over the Lary, and also a Road from Addistone Hill in the Parish of Holbeten, to the Totness Road at Lady Down in the Parish of Ugborough in the County of Devon. (Repealed by Ugborough and Modbury Road (Devon) Act 1836 (6 & 7 Will. 4. c. xlviii))
Skipton and Colne Road Act 1823	4 Geo. 4. c. cx	17 June 1823
An Act for repairing and improving the Road leading from Skipton in the County of York to Colne in the County of Lancaster.
Wansford Bridge, Stamford and Bourn Road Act 1823	4 Geo. 4. c. cxi	17 June 1823
An Act for more effectually repairing the Road from Wansford Bridge in the County of Northampton to Stamford, and from Stamford to Bourn in the County of Lincoln.
Roads from Redrow to Peathill (Stirlingshire) Act 1823 (repealed)	4 Geo. 4. c. cxii	17 June 1823
An Act for making and repairing certain Roads from Redrow to Peathill in the County of Stirling. (Repealed by Redrow and Peathill Roads (Stirlingshire) Act 1827 (7 & 8 Geo. 4. c. xcvii))
Minehead Pier and Harbour Act 1823	4 Geo. 4. c. cxiii	27 June 1823
An Act for more effectually improving and keeping in Repair the Pier and Harbour of Minehead in the County of Somerset.
City of London Improvement Act 1823 (repealed)	4 Geo. 4. c. cxiv	27 June 1823
An Act for altering and amending Two Acts passed in the Eleventh (Note: City of London Sewerage Act 1771 (11 Geo. 3. c. 29)) and Thirty third (Note: London (Streets and Sewers) Act 1793 (33 Geo. 3. c. 75)) Years of His late Majesty King George the Third, for consolidating, extending and rendering more effectual the Powers granted by several Acts of Parliament for making, enlarging, amending and cleansing the Vaults, Drains and Sewers within the City of London and Liberties thereof; and for paving, cleansing and lighting the Streets, Lanes, Squares, Yards, Courts, Alleys, Passages and Places, and preventing and removing Obstructions and Annoyances within the same. (Repealed by City of London Sewers Act 1848 (11 & 12 Vict. c. clxiii))
Manchester and Salford Water Act 1823	4 Geo. 4. c. cxv	27 June 1823
An Act to alter amend and enlarge the Powers of the several Acts (Note: Manchester and Salford Water Act 1809 (49 Geo. 3. c. cxcii)) (Note: Manchester and Salford Water Act 1813 (53 Geo. 3. c. xx)) (Note: Manchester and Salford Water Act 1816 (56 Geo. 3. c. xii)) (Note: Manchester and Salford Water Act 1821 (1 & 2 Geo. 4. c. xlvii)) passed for more effectually supplying with Water the Inhabitants of the Town of Manchester and Salford, in the Parish of Manchester in the County Palatine of Lancaster.
Southwark Bridge Act 1823	4 Geo. 4. c. cxvi	27 June 1823
An Act to amend several Acts (Note: Southwark Bridge Act 1811 (51 Geo. 3. c. clxvi)) (Note: Southwark Bridge Act 1813 (53 Geo. 3. c. lxxxvii)) (Note: Southwark Bridge Act 1816 (56 Geo. 3. c. xi)) (Note: Southwark Bridge Act 1818 (58 Geo. 3. c. lxviii)) (Note: Southwark Bridge Act 1820 (1 Geo. 4. c. xlix)) for erecting a Bridge over the River Thames, from the City of London to the opposite Bank in the Parish of Saint Saviour in the County of Surrey.
Christ Church at Wood House Act 1823	4 Geo. 4. c. cxvii	27 June 1823
An Act for building a Church or Chapel of Ease in the Hamlet of Far Town and Parish of Huddersfield, in the West Riding of the County of York.
St. Andrew Holborn Tithes Act 1823 (repealed)	4 Geo. 4. c. cxviii	27 June 1823
An Act for extinguishing Tithes, and customary Payments in lieu of Tithes, and all Demands for Easter Offerings, within the London or City Liberty of Saint Andrew Holborn in the City of London; and for making Compensation in lieu thereof. (Repealed by City of London (Tithes) Act 1947 (10 & 11 Geo. 6. c. xxxi))
Gaslight and Coke Company Act 1823 (repealed)	4 Geo. 4. c. cxix	27 June 1823
An Act to enlarge the Powers of the Gas Light and Coke Company, and to amend several Acts (Note: Gas Light and Coke Company Act 1810 (50 Geo. 3. c. clxiii)) (Note: Gas Light and Coke Company Act 1814 (54 Geo. 3. c. cxvi)) (Note: Metropolis Gas Act 1816 (56 Geo. 3. c. lxxxvii)) (Note: Gaslight and Coke Company Act 1819 (59 Geo. 3. c. xx)) passed in the Reign of His late Majesty relating to the said Company. (Repealed by Gaslight and Coke Company's Act 1868 (31 & 32 Vict. c. cvi))
Winchester Roads Act 1823	4 Geo. 4. c. cxx	27 June 1823
An Act for repairing the Roads from Oxdown Gate in Popham Lane to the City of Winchester, and from the said City through Hursley to Chandlers Ford, and from Hursley aforesaid to the Turnpike Road at Romsey, and from the Hundred at Romsey, through Chilworth, to the River at Swathling, in the County of Southampton; and from the said Turnpike Road at Romsey, through Ringwood, in the said County, to Longham Bridge and Wimborne Minster in the County of Dorset.
Welsh Harp and Stonebridge, and Castle Bromwich and Birmingham Roads Act 1823	4 Geo. 4. c. cxxi	27 June 1823
An Act for more effectually repairing the Roads leading from a Place called the Welsh Harp, in the Township of Stonnall in the County of Stafford, to Stone Bridge, and from Castle Bromwich to Birmingham in the County of Warwick.
Roads from Tamworth and from Harrington Bridge Act 1823 (repealed)	4 Geo. 4. c. cxxii	27 June 1823
An Act for repairing the Roads from the Borough of Tamworth in the Counties of Stafford and Warwick, to the Town of Ashby-de-la-Zouch in the County of Leicester, and from Harrington Bridge (heretofore Sawley Ferry) in the said County of Leicester, to a Turnpike Gate at or near the End of Swarcliff Lane, leading to Ashby-de-la-Zouch aforesaid. (Repealed by Tamworth and Harrington Bridge Roads Act 1863 (26 & 27 Vict. c. clv))
Southwark Court of Requests Act 1823 (repealed)	4 Geo. 4. c. cxxiii	4 July 1823
An Act to enlarge the Powers of and render more effectual certain Acts of the Twenty second (Note: Small Debts, Southwark, etc. Act 1748 (22 Geo. 2. c. 47)) and Thirty second (Note: Small Debts, Southwark, etc. Act 1758 (32 Geo. 2. c. 6)) Year of the Reign of His Majesty King George the Second, and the Forty sixth (Note: Southwark and East Brixton Court of Requests Act 1806 (46 Geo. 3. c. lxxxvii)) Year of the Reign of His late Majesty King George the Third, for the more easy and speedy Recovery of Small Debts within the Town and Borough of Southwark, and the several Parishes and Places in the said Acts mentioned, and to regulate the Fees payable to the Court thereby established. (Repealed by County Courts Act 1846 (9 & 10 Vict. c. 95))
London Dock Company Act 1823 (repealed)	4 Geo. 4. c. cxxiv	10 July 1823
An Act to allow further Time for the Completion of the Docks and other Works belonging to the London Dock Company. (Repealed by London Docks Act 1828 (9 Geo. 4. c. cxvi))
Middlesex Licensing of Alehouses Act 1823	4 Geo. 4. c. cxxv	11 July 1823
An Act for altering the Time for holding General Annual Meetings for licensing Alehouses within the County of Middlesex, and for authorising the Justices of the Peace for the said County to remunerate High Constables.
Limerick Improvement Act 1823	4 Geo. 4. c. cxxvi	18 July 1823
An Act for the better Government of the City of Limerick, and the due Appropriation of the Public Revenues thereof.

=== Private acts ===
Short title	Citation	Royal assent
Long title
Croydon Inclosure Act 1823	4 Geo. 4. c. 1 Pr.	19 March 1823
An Act for inclosing certain Lands in the Parish of Croydon in the County of Surrey.
Seel's Estate Act 1823	4 Geo. 4. c. 2 Pr.	2 May 1823
An Act for vesting the settled Estates of Thomas Molyneux Seel Esquire, in the County of Lancaster, in Trustees to be sold, and for laying out the Monies to arise by such Sales in the Purchase of a more convenient and compact Estate, to be settled to the same Uses.
Oulton Inclosure Act 1823	4 Geo. 4. c. 3 Pr.	2 May 1823
An Act for inclosing Lands in the Township or Quarter of Oulton, in the Parish of Wigton in the County of Cumberland.
Warden Inclosure Act 1823	4 Geo. 4. c. 4 Pr.	2 May 1823
An Act for dividing, inclosing and improving a certain Moor or Open Pasture called Hawdon Fields otherwise Brown Moor, in the Parish of Warden in the County of Northumberland.
Egton-with-Newland Inclosure (Amendment) Act 1823	4 Geo. 4. c. 5 Pr.	12 May 1823
An Act to amend an Act made in the Forty second Year of the Reign of His late Majesty King George the Third, (Note: Egton-with-Newland Inclosure Act 1802 (42 Geo. 3. c. xlii)) for dividing, allotting, inclosing and appropriating the Commons, Waste Grounds and Mosses, within the Manor or Township of Egton with Newland, in the Parish of Ulverston, in the County Palatine of Lancaster.
Cherry Burton Inclosure Act 1823	4 Geo. 4. c. 6 Pr.	12 May 1823
An Act for inclosing Lands in the Parish of North Burton, otherwise Cherry Burton, in the East Riding of the County of York.
Ryton Inclosure Act 1823	4 Geo. 4. c. 7 Pr.	23 May 1823
An Act for inclosing Lands in the Parish of Ryton, in the County of Durham.
Thame and Sydenham Inclosure Act 1823	4 Geo. 4. c. 8 Pr.	23 May 1823
An Act for inclosing Lands in the Parishes of Thame and Sydenham in the County of Oxford.
Kirkby-in-Kendal Inclosure Act 1823	4 Geo. 4. c. 9 Pr.	23 May 1823
An Act for inclosing Lands within the Townships or Divisions of Whitwell and Selside, Skelsmergh and Crook, in the Parish of Kirkby in Kendal, in the County of Westmorland.
Belshes's Estate Act 1823	4 Geo. 4. c. 10 Pr.	30 May 1823
An Act for settling and securing Parts and Portions of the Lands and Barony of Invermay in the County of Perth, to and in favour of Alexander Hepburn Belshes Esquire, and the Series of Heirs entitled to take by certain Deeds of Entail made by Barbara Hepburn and others, and Sir Patrick Heburn Murray, and under the Conditions and Limitations contained therein; and for vesting in lieu thereof the Barony and Estate of Blackcastle, in the Counties of Haddington and Berwick, in the laid Alexander Hepburn Belshes, and his Heirs and Assigns, in Fee Simple.
King's College and Clare Hall, Cambridge: exchange of estates.	4 Geo. 4. c. 11 Pr.	30 May 1823
An Act for effecting an Exchange between the Provost and Scholars of the King's College of Blessed Mary and Saint Nicholas of Cambridge, and the Master or Keeper, Fellows and Scholars of the College or Hall commonly called Clare Hall in the University of Cambridge.
Beam Heath in Alvaston Inclosure Act 1823	4 Geo. 4. c. 12 Pr.	30 May 1823
An Act to amend and enlarge the Powers and Provisions of an Act of His late Majesty King George the Third, (Note: Beam Heath in Alvaston Inclosure Act 1803 (43 Geo. 3. c. cxxiii)) for inclosing and improving Beam Heath in the Township of Alvaston, in the Parish of Nantwich, in the County Palatine of Chester.
Buck's Estate Act 1823	4 Geo. 4. c. 13 Pr.	17 June 1823
An Act to enable the Reverend Richard Buck Clerk and Margaret his Wife, and the Survivor of them, to grant Leases of a Moiety of the Coal Mines within the Estates devised by the Will of John Hull deceased, in the County of Lancaster.
Exchanging John and Augusta Biddulph's and Philip and Sarah Jones's estate in Wiltshire, for estates in Warwickshire and Worcestershire settled to them and their children by the will of Sarah Richards.	4 Geo. 4. c. 14 Pr.	17 June 1823
An Act for exchanging an Estate in the County of Wilts, whereof John Biddulph Esquire and Augusta his Wife, and Philip Jones Esquire and Sarah his Wife, have joint Power of Disposition, for Estates in the Counties of Warwick and Worcester, settled by the Will of Sarah Richards, in trust for the same Parties and their Children.
Unett's Estate Act 1823	4 Geo. 4. c. 15 Pr.	17 June 1823
An Act for effectuating an Exchange of an Estate in the Parish of Stone in the County of Stafford (to which Ann Unett, an Infant, is entitled in Tail), for an Estate of greater Value, belonging to John Wilkes Unett and Elizabeth his Wife, and Lettice Unett.
Sir George Thomas and George White Thomas Estates Act 1823	4 Geo. 4. c. 16 Pr.	17 June 1823
An Act for confirming certain Exchanges made by Sir George Thomas Baronet, deceased, and George White Thomas Esquire, deceased, of Estates at Yapton, Walberton, Madehurst, Bilsham and Climping, in the County of Sussex
Viscount Gage and See of Chichester Estates Act 1823	4 Geo. 4. c. 17 Pr.	17 June 1823
An Act for effecting an Exchange between the Right Honourable Henry Hall Viscount Gage, and the Dean and Chapter of the Cathedral Church of the Holy Trinity of Chichester, of Estates in the County of Sussex.
Philanthropic Society's Estate Act 1823 or the Philanthropic Society's Act 1823 (repealed)	4 Geo. 4. c. 18 Pr.	17 June 1823
An Act for enabling the President, Vice Presidents, Treasurer and Members of the Philanthropic Society to purchase from the Corporation and other Persons entitled thereto the Lands and Hereditaments in the Parish of Saint George the Martyr, Southwark, in the County of Surrey, upon which they have erected a Chapel, Buildings and other Works, and such other Land adjoining thereto as may be required for the Purposes of their Charity. (Repealed by Statute Law (Repeals) Act 2013 (c. 2))
Earl of Wemyss's Estate Act 1823	4 Geo. 4. c. 19 Pr.	17 June 1823
An Act to empower the Judges of the Court of Session to take an Account of the Debts and Burdens affecting and that may be made to affect the entailed Estate of Wemyss, in the Counties of Fife and Perth; and to sell the said Estate, or such Part thereof as shall be sufficient to discharge the said Debts and Burdens.
Capel's Estate Act 1823	4 Geo. 4. c. 20 Pr.	17 June 1823
An Act for vesting in Trustees an Estate in the Parish of Chievely, in the County of Berks, devised in strict Settlement by the Will of William Capel Esquire, deceased, and afterwards contracted to be sold by him, in order to effectuate the Sale thereof, agreeably to such Contract.
Guise's Estate Act 1823	4 Geo. 4. c. 21 Pr.	17 June 1823
An Act for exchanging certain Parts of the Estates devised by the Will of the late Sir William Guise Baronet, in strict Settlement, for certain other Estates in the County of Gloucester; and for vesting other Parts of the said Estates in Trustees, to be sold for paying off Incumbrances, and for other Purposes.
Sir Samuel Romilly's Infant Sons' Estate Act 1823	4 Geo. 4. c. 22 Pr.	27 June 1823
An Act for authorizing the Investment of Monies belonging to the Infant Sons of Sir Samuel Romilly deceased, in the Purchase of certain Parts of his Daughter's Share of his Real Estate, to be conveyed to Trustees upon certain Trusts.
Congerston Inclosure Act 1823	4 Geo. 4. c. 23 Pr.	27 June 1823
An Act for inclosing Lands within the Manor of Congerston otherwise Congeston, in the County of Leicester.
Viscount Wentworth's Estate Act 1823	4 Geo. 4. c. 24 Pr.	4 July 1823
An Act for vesting Part of the Estates devised by the Will of Thomas Viscount Wentworth in Trustees, upon Trust to sell the same to the Right Honourable Richard William Penn Earl Howe, and to apply the Money arising from the Sale thereof in the Purchase of other Estates in the Counties of Leicester and Warwick, or one of them, to be settled to the subsisting Uses of the said Will.
Sidney Sussex College's Estate Act 1823	4 Geo. 4. c. 25 Pr.	4 July 1823
An Act to amend an Act passed in the Fifty eighth Year of the Reign of His late Majesty King George the Third, intituled "An Act for vesting certain Pieces or Parcels of Land and ether Hereditaments, belonging to Sidney Sussex College in the University of Cambridge, in Trustees for Sale, with Powers to lease on Fines, and for applying the Purchase Monies, and Monies to arise from Fines, in Manner therein mentioned." (Note: Estate of Sidney Sussex College, Cambridge Act 1818 (58 Geo. 3. c. 39 Pr.))
See of Canterbury's Estate Act 1823	4 Geo. 4. c. 26 Pr.	4 July 1823
An Act to enable the Trustees of the Will of the late Sir William East Baronet, deceased, and Tenants under the See of Canterbury, to join in Grants of Building and Repairing Leases with the Archbishop of Canterbury for the Time being, of Lands in Lambeth Marsh held under the said See.
Thomas Gordon's Estate Act 1823	4 Geo. 4. c. 27 Pr.	4 July 1823
An Act for empowering the Judges of the Court of Session in Scotland to sell certain Parts of the Dominium directum (Note: Dominium directum refers to land's superior feudal estate.) or Superiority of the entailed Estate of Park in the County of Banff, presently belonging to Thomas Gordon Esquire of Park, and to apply the Price to be obtained for the same in the Payment of the Debts affecting the said Estate.
Sheffield Hospital Act 1823	4 Geo. 4. c. 28 Pr.	10 July 1823
An Act for changing the Site of the Hospital at Sheffield in the County of York, founded by the Right Honourable Gilbert Earl of Shrewsbury; and for the better regulation of the Affairs of that Charity.
Mynors's Estate Act 1823	4 Geo. 4. c. 29 Pr.	10 July 1823
An Act for vesting Part of the Estates devised by the Will of Edward Mynors £squire, situate in the Counties of Stafford and Leicester, in Trustees, upon Trust to sell the same; and for laying out the Monies arising from such Sales in the Purchase of more convenient Estates, to be settled to the same Uses.
Baslow Inclosure Act 1823 (Note: This act was not printed by the King's Printer.)	4 Geo. 4. c. 30 Pr.	12 May 1823
An Act for inclosing Lands in the Manor and Township of Baslow and Hamlets of Bubnell, Curbar and Froggatt, all in the said Manor of Baslow, and in the Parish of Bakewell, the County of Derby.
Hoff and Hoff Row Inclosure Act 1823	4 Geo. 4. c. 31 Pr.	23 May 1823
An Act for inclosing Lands in the Townships of Hoff and Hoff Row and Drybeck, in the Manor of Drybeck, Hoff Row and Netherhoff, in the Parish of Saint Lawrence, Appleby, in the County of Westmoreland.
Allardyce's Divorce Act 1823	4 Geo. 4. c. 32 Pr.	23 May 1823
An Act to dissolve the Marriage of James Allardyce Esquire with Dorothy Allardyce his now Wife, and to enable him to marry again; and for other Purposes.
Hoffmann's Naturalization Act 1823	4 Geo. 4. c. 33 Pr.	23 May 1823
An Act for naturalizing Augustus Frederick William Hoffmann.
Coventry's Charity Estate Act 1823	4 Geo. 4. c. 34 Pr.	17 June 1823
An Act for confirming an Agreement between Sir John Pakington Baronet, and the Trustees of the Estates devised by the Will of the Right Honourable Henry Coventry Esquire, deceased, for charitable Purposes.
Abthorpe Inclosure Act 1823	4 Geo. 4. c. 35 Pr.	17 June 1823
An Act for inclosing Lands in the Parish of Abthorpe in the County of Northampton.
Tinne's Naturalization Act 1823	4 Geo. 4. c. 36 Pr.	17 June 1823
An Act for naturalizing Philip Frederick Tinne.
Boode's Naturalization Act 1823	4 Geo. 4. c. 37 Pr.	17 June 1823
An Act for naturalizing Andreas Christian Boode, and his Two infant Children Phebe Boode and John Christian Boode.
Cunliffe's Divorce Act 1823	4 Geo. 4. c. 38 Pr.	27 June 1823
An Act to dissolve the Marriage of Robert Henry Cunliffe Esquire with Louisa his now Wife, and to enable him to marry again.
Ferguson's Naturalization Act 1823	4 Geo. 4. c. 39 Pr.	27 June 1823
An Act for naturalizing Henry Robert Ferguson.
Allegati's Naturalization Act 1823	4 Geo. 4. c. 40 Pr.	27 June 1823
An Act for naturalizing Francis Allegati.
Benyon de Beauvoir's Estate Act 1823	4 Geo. 4. c. 41 Pr.	4 July 1823
An Act for rendering valid and effectual the Powers of Sale and Exchange, and for the Appointment of new Trustees, in the Settlements made of Estates belonging to Richard Benyon de Beauvoir Esquire, pursuant to the Will of Richard Benyon Esquire, his late Fadier, deceased.

=== Sources ===
- The Statutes of the United Kingdom of Great Britain and Ireland, 4 George IV. 1823. London. 1823 – via Internet Archive.
- The Statutes of the United Kingdom of Great Britain and Ireland, 4 George IV. 1823. London. 1823 – via Google Books.
- Raithby, John (ed.). The Statutes of the United Kingdom of Great Britain and Ireland. Vol. The Ninth, Containing the Acts 4 George IV. (1823.) and 5 George IV. (1824.). London: Eyre and Strahan – via Google Books.
- Journal of the House of Commons. Vol. 78. London: His Majesty's Stationery Office. pp. 3–485.

== See also ==
- List of acts of the Parliament of the United Kingdom
