= East India Company's Service Act 1823 =

Act of the Parliament of the United Kingdom

- Act of Parliament
- Parliament of the United Kingdom
- Long title: An Act to consolidate and amend the Laws for punishing Mutiny and Desertion of Officers and Soldiers in the Service of the East India Company; and to authorize Soldiers and Sailors in the East Indies to send and receive Letters at a reduced Rate of Postage.
- Citation: 4 Geo. 4. c. 81
- Territorial extent: United Kingdom

Dates
- Royal assent: 18 July 1823
- Commencement: 1 February 1824 (Note: Section 74.)
- Repealed: 1 January 1841
Other legislation
Amends	East India Company Act 1813
Repeals/revokes	See § Repealed enactments
Amended by	Post Office (Repeal of Laws) Act 1837
Repealed by	Mutiny, East Indies Act 1840
Relates to	Mutiny, East Indies Act 1754; Courts-martial, East Indies Act 1760

Status: Repealed

Text of statute as originally enacted

The East India Company's Service Act 1823 (4 Geo. 4. c. 81) was an act of the Parliament of the United Kingdom that consolidated enactments related to mutiny and desertion of soldiers in the East India Company.

== Provisions ==
=== Repealed enactments ===
Section 74 of the act repealed 2 enactments, listed in that section.

Citation	Short title	Extent of repeal
27 Geo. 2. c. 9	Mutiny, East Indies Act 1754	Except as provided by the act.
1 Geo. 3. c. 14	Courts-martial, East Indies Act 1760	The whole act.

== Subsequent developments ==
The whole act was repealed by section 59 of the Mutiny, East Indies Act 1840 (3 & 4 Vict. c. 37), which came into force on 1 January 1841.

That act did not contain a saving for the repeal of acts by this act, meaning that those acts were again repealed by the Statute Law Revision Act 1867 (30 & 31 Vict. c. 59).
