= Composition for Tithes (Ireland) Act 1823 =

Act of the Parliament of the United Kingdom

- Act of Parliament
- Parliament of the United Kingdom
- Long title: An Act to provide for the establishing of Compositions for Tithes in Ireland for a limited Time.
- Citation: 4 Geo. 4. c. 99
- Territorial extent: United Kingdom

Dates
- Royal assent: 19 July 1823
- Commencement: 19 July 1823 (Note: Section 1.)
- Repealed: 5 August 1873
Other legislation
Repealed by	Statute Law Revision Act 1873

Status: Repealed

Text of statute as originally enacted

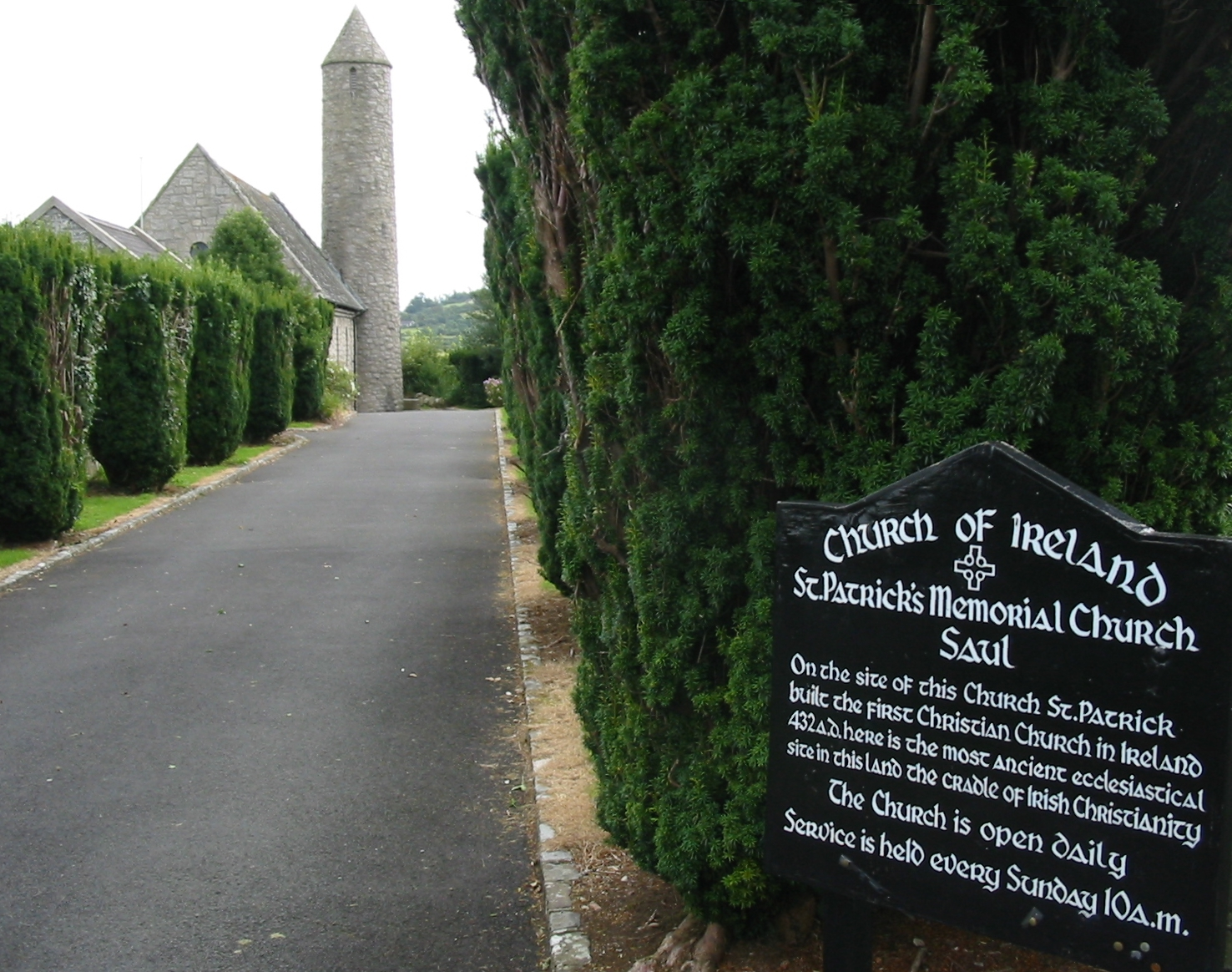
Saul church, an important part of the Church of Ireland, is built on the reputed spot of the first church in Ireland.

The Composition for Tithes Act 1823 (4 Geo. 4. c. 99), also known as the Tithe Composition Act 1823, was an act of the Parliament of the United Kingdom that required all occupiers of Irish agricultural holdings of over one acre to pay monetary tithes to support the Anglican Church in Ireland, instead of a percentage of agricultural yield. The act also allowed for those who paid a large tithe to be able to negotiate the composition of the tithes for their parish; that is to decide on what monetary basis the tithes would be based, so that the tithes would be reasonable in comparison to income for the tithe-payers and sufficient for the subsistence of the parishes. It was thought by some members of Parliament to be a conciliatory measure that would reduce the oppressive nature of the then current tithe system.

== Controversy ==
Controversy rose up quickly, even in Parliament itself. Some Members of Parliament felt that the Irish clergy were already grossly overpaid compared to clergy in England. Catholics and Dissenters did not feel that the Composition Act reduced the oppression of the tithe system in light of the fact that the six million Catholics in Ireland were still forced to pay the tithes for churches that they did not attend or use. They saw that as persecution by the English Anglicans towards people who were not members of the established Church.

It also seemed to critics that the act did nothing to reform the problems in the Irish clergy: that they were often absent from their parishes and that they held enormous wealth. A change in the composition of tithes would have had no effect on the level of clergymen's wealth. While the Irish clergy and their supporters refuted those claims, popular opinion seemed to overshadow their arguments. Specifically, non-resident clergy were resident elsewhere and thus could not be considered absentee. In support of the clergy's point of view, however, their income had also diminished due to a reduction in tithe-rates. In that way, the Act would have helped the clergy, as currency was much more versatile in helping the church than raw goods.

== Reform and war ==
Attempts at reform came as early as 1828 when Thomas Greene, a Member of Parliament, introduced a bill that would have replaced the tithes with corn rents, a proposal that failed. Lord Althorp attempted the same measure in 1833, which also failed. His bill the following year also did not pass, despite severe emendation. Many reforms were lost among other bills in Parliament and never came to fruition.

During the "Tithe War" from 1831 to 1838, Irish peasants rebelled and refused to pay the tithes, sometimes violently persecuting those who did pay the tithes. The government found it hard to enforce the law, due to the popularity of the rebels' cause. The Irish believed the tithes were simply another form of English abuse, and the rebellion took on an apparent aura of nationalism, or at least the feeling of a religious war against the persecution of the faithful.

== Outcome ==
Finally, the Tithe Commutation Act 1838 (1 & 2 Vict. c. 109) applied the tithe-tax to landlords instead of peasants. This created a new system where peasants paid an increase in rent instead of a direct tithe, but it simultaneously enabled peasants to no longer feel that the Anglican Church in Ireland took advantage of them. The bill did not solve all of the problems in Ireland, but allowed for some respite in the continuing conflict in the United Kingdom of Great Britain and Ireland.

== Subsequent developments ==
The whole act was repealed by section 1 of, and the schedule to, the Statute Law Revision Act 1873 (36 & 37 Vict. c. 91), which came into force on 5 August 1873.
