= Warehousing of Goods Act 1823 =

Act of the Parliament of the United Kingdom

- Act of Parliament
- Parliament of the United Kingdom
- Long title: An Act to make more effectual Provision for permitting Goods imported to be secured in Warehouses, or other Places, without Payment of Duty on the first Entry thereof.
- Citation: 4 Geo. 4. c. 24
- Territorial extent: United Kingdom

Dates
- Royal assent: 12 May 1823
- Commencement: 5 July 1823 (Note: Section 98.)
- Repealed: 5 July 1825
Other legislation
Repeals/revokes	See § Repealed enactments
Repealed by	Customs Law Repeal Act 1825

Status: Repealed

Text of statute as originally enacted

The Warehousing of Goods Act 1823 (4 Geo. 4. c. 24) was an act of the Parliament of the United Kingdom that consolidated enactments relating to the warehousing of imported goods without payment of duty in the United Kingdom.

== Provisions ==
=== Repealed enactments ===
Section 1 of the act repealed 22 enactments, listed in that section.

Citation	Short title	Description	Extent of repeal
43 Geo. 3. c. 132	Warehousing of Goods Act 1803	An Act for permitting certain Goods imported into Great Britain, to be secured in Warehouse without Payment of Duty.	The whole act.
45 Geo. 3. c. 87	Bonded Warehouses Act 1805	An Act to authorize the Lords Commissioners of His Majesty's Treasury to permit certain Articles to be warehoused in different Ports in Great Britain, upon giving Security for the Payment of Duties upon the Articles therein mentioned.	The whole act.
46 Geo. 3. c. 137	Bonding Warehouses Act 1806	An Act to extend the Provisions of an Act made in the Forty-third Year of His present Majesty, for permitting certain Articles to be warehoused in Great Britain, to other Articles not therein mentioned, and to alter the Condition of the Bond directed to be given by an Act of the Twenty-fourth Year of His present Majesty, by the Masters and Owners of Vessels and Boats licensed by the Lords of the Admiralty.	Section 1, so far as it relates to the extension of the provisions of the Warehousing of Goods Act 1803 to other articles not therein mentioned.
47 Geo. 3. St. 1. c. 48	Bonding of Coffee, etc. Act 1807	An Act to repeal so much of certain Acts as relates to the Regulations or Conditions under which Coffee, Cocoa Nuts, Sugar and Rice, (not being the Produce of the East Indies), are allowed to be secured in Warehouses, without Payment of Duty; and to authorize the Collectors and Comptrollers of the Customs in His Majesty's Colonies and Plantations in America, and the West Indies, to administer certain Oaths.	So far as it relates to coffee, cocoa nuts, sugar and rice.
48 Geo. 3. c. 32	Bonding Warehouses (Ireland) Act 1808	An Act to permit certain Goods imported into Ireland to be warehoused or secured, without the Duties due on the Importation thereof being first paid.	The whole act.
48 Geo. 3. c. 120	Duties on Spirits and Coffee Act 1808	An Act for reducing the Excise Duties on Coffee imported into Great Britain, and for directing that Coffee and Cocoa warehoused shall be subject to the Regulations of an Act of the Forty-third Year of His present Majesty, for permitting certain Goods imported to be secured in Warehouses.	So far as it relates to coffee or cocoa so warehoused.
48 Geo. 3. c. 126	Removal of Goods for Exportation, etc. Act 1808	An Act to permit Goods secured in Warehouses in the Port of London to be removed to the Out-ports for Exportation to any Part of Europe, for empowering His Majesty to direct that Licences which His Majesty is authorized to grant under His Sign Manual may be granted by One of the Principal Secretaries of State; and for enabling His Majesty to permit the Exportation of Goods in Vessels of less Burthen than are now allowed by Law, during the present Hostilities, and until One Month after the Signature of the preliminary Articles of Peace.	So far as it relates to the removal of such goods.
49 Geo. 3. c. 106	Warehoused Goods Act 1809	An Act for allowing further Time for taking Goods out of Warehouse, and paying Duties thereon.	The whole act. (Note: The whole act was repealed by section 1 of, and the schedule to, the Statute Law Revision Act 1861 (24 & 25 Vict. c. 101), which came into force on 6 August 1861. The note to the bill states "Repealed (but see terms of repeal) by 4 Geo. 4. c. 24 s. 1)")
50 Geo. 3. c. 38	Bonded Warehouses (Ireland) Act 1810	An Act to extend the Provisions of an Act passed in the Forty-eighth Year of His present Majesty's Reign, intituled, An Act to permit certain Goods imported into Ireland to be warehoused or secured without the Duties due on the Importation thereof being first paid, and to amend the same.	The whole act.
50 Geo. 3. c. 64	Exportation (No. 5) Act 1810	An Act to permit the Removal of Goods, Wares and Merchandize, from the Port in Great Britain where first warehoused, to any other warehousing Port for the Purpose of Exportation.	The whole act.
51 Geo. 3. c. 47	Commercial Treaty with Portugal Act 1811	An Act for carrying into Effect the Provisions of a Treaty of Amity, Commerce and Navigation, concluded between His Majesty and His Royal Highness the Prince Regent of Portugal.	Section 7, so far as it relates to the warehousing or securing of goods or articles, the growth or produce of the territories or dominions of the Crown of Portugal, in warehouses belonging to the West India Dock Company or the London Dock Company.
52 Geo. 3. c. 76	Customs, etc. (Ireland) Act 1812	An Act to amend several Acts relating to the Revenue of Customs and Port Duties in Ireland.	Section 3, so far as it relates to requiring the attendance of merchants to open the locks of warehouses.
52 Geo. 3. c. 140	Exportation (No. 3) Act 1812	An Act to permit the Exportation of certain Articles to the Isle of Man from Great Britain.	So far as it relates to the exporting of such articles from warehouses.
52 Geo. 3. c. 142	Removal of Goods Act 1812	An Act to permit the Removal of Goods from one Bonding Warehouse to another, in the same Port.	The whole act.
52 Geo. 3. c. 149	Coffee, etc. Act 1812	An Act to regulate the Separation of damaged from sound Coffee, and to permit Dealers to send out any Quantity of Coffee not exceeding eight Pounds Weight without Permit, until the End of Two Years from the passing of this Act.	So far as it relates to coffee deposited in any warehouses.
55 Geo. 3. c. 82	Customs, etc. Act 1815	An Act to grant Duties of Customs, and to allow Drawbacks and Bounties on certain Goods, Wares and Merchandize imported into and exported from Ireland, in lieu of former Duties, Drawbacks and Bounties; and to make further Regulations for securing the Duties of Customs in Ireland.	Sections 11 and 12, so far as they relate to goods or merchandize warehoused or secured without payment of duty.
1 Geo. 4. c. 59	Damaged Coffee etc. Act 1820	An Act to amend, revive and continue, until the Twenty-fifth Day of March One thousand eight hundred and twenty-five, an Act of the Fifty-second Year of His late Majesty, for regulating the Separation of damaged from sound Coffee, and for permitting Dealers to send out any Quantity of Coffee, not exceeding Eight Pounds Weight, without Permit.	The whole act. (Note: The whole act was repealed by section 1 of, and the schedule to, the Statute Law Revision Act 1873 (36 & 37 Vict. c. 91), which came into force on 5 August 1873. The note to the bill states "Repealed by 4 Geo. 4. c. 24 s. 1; or, so far as not unrepealed, expired.")
55 Geo. 3. c. 82	Customs, etc. Act 1815	An Act to grant Duties of Customs, and to allow Drawbacks and Bounties on certain Goods, Wares and Merchandize imported into and exported from Ireland, in lieu of former Duties, Drawbacks and Bounties; and to make further Regulations for securing the Duties of Customs in Ireland.	Sections 11, 12 and 13, so far as they relate to goods or merchandize warehoused in Ireland.
57 Geo. 3. c. 116	Customs and Excise Act 1817	An Act for limiting the time now allowed by Law for Production of the Certificate of due Delivery of Goods removed from one Warehousing Port in Great Britain to another for the Purpose of Exportation; for altering the Hours for shipping Goods in the Port of London; and to empower Officers of the Customs and Excise to permit the Removal of Goods from one Bonding Warehouse to another in the same Port.	Section 1, so far as it relates to the production of the certificate of due delivery of goods removed from one warehousing port to another, and the removal of such goods.
59 Geo. 3. c. 123	Customs (No. 6) Act 1819	An Act to empower the Officers of the Customs in Great Britain to allow Reports of Vessels' Cargoes to be amended; to require Goods which have been warehoused without Payment of Duties, or being prohibited, warehoused for Exportation, to be put on board Vessels by Persons licensed for that Purpose; to direct that Cocquet and Bond shall be required for Slate and Stone carried Coastwise; and to empower Officers of the Customs to administer Oaths.	So far as it relates to the licence for putting warehoused goods on board vessels, and the removal of goods under such licences.
1 & 2 Geo. 4. c. 97	Coasting Trade (Great Britain) Act 1821	An Act to amend several Acts relating to the Coasting Trade of Great Britain.	So far as it relates to the removal of warehoused goods from port to port a second time.
1 & 2 Geo. 4. c. 105	Excise Act 1821	An Act for amending the Laws of Excise relating to warehoused Goods.	So far as it relates to the warehousing or securing, and removal, of goods, wares and merchandize, the fitting of wines, and the packages in which pepper may be imported from the East Indies.

== Subsequent developments ==
The qualified terms of the repeal led to several acts being repealed by later Statute Law Revision Acts, including:

- The Statute Law Revision Act 1861 (24 & 25 Vict. c. 101)
- The Statute Law Revision Act 1873 (36 & 37 Vict. c. 91)

The whole act was repealed by the Customs Law Repeal Act 1825 (6 Geo. 4. c. 105), which came into force on 5 July 1825.
