= Mutiny, East Indies Act 1840 =

Act of the Parliament of the United Kingdom

- Act of Parliament
- Parliament of the United Kingdom
- Long title: An Act to consolidate and amend the Laws for punishing Mutiny and Desertion of Officers and Soldiers in the Service of the East India Company, and for providing for the Observance of Discipline in the Indian Navy, and to amend the Laws for regulating the Payment of Regimental Debts, and the Distribution of the Effects of Officers and Soldiers dying in Service.
- Citation: 3 & 4 Vict. c. 37
- Territorial extent: United Kingdom

Dates
- Royal assent: 4 August 1840
- Commencement: 1 January 1841 (Note: Section 59.)
- Repealed: 9 August 1874
Other legislation
Repeals/revokes	East India Company's Service Act 1823
Repealed by	Statute Law Revision Act 1874 (No. 2)

Status: Repealed

Text of statute as originally enacted

The Mutiny, East Indies Act 1840 (3 & 4 Vict. c. 37) was an act of the Parliament of the United Kingdom that consolidated enactments related to mutiny and desertion of soldiers in the East India Company.

== Provisions ==
Section 59 of the act repealed the East India Company's Service Act 1823 (3 & 4 Vict. c. 37).

== Subsequent developments ==
The whole act was repealed by section 1 of, and the schedule to, the Statute Law Revision Act 1874 (No. 2) (37 & 38 Vict. c. 96), which came into force on 9 August 1844.
