= Penal bond =

A penal bond is a written instrument executed between an obligor and an obligee designed to secure the performance of a legal obligation through the in terrorem effect of the threat of a penalty for nonperformance.

== Types of bonds ==
At its simplest, a bond need only state who is to be paid, what sum, when, and where (for example: "'Know all men etc. that I, AB, am firmly bound to CD in [$]n to be paid at Michaelmas next following'"). At common law, these bonds were nearly impossible to contest from the perspective of the obligor (the debtor). A simple bond can properly be considered a penal bond if it calls for the payment of a sum that is punitive in relation to the damages that would be caused by nonperformance.

Historically, the most significant type of penal bond was the penal bond with conditional defeasance. A penal bond with conditional defeasance combined in one document the bond (the promise to pay a specified amount of money) with the contractual obligation. It did this in what the historian Brian Simpson called a ‘topsy-turvy’ fashion by printing the bond on the front of the document and the condition, whose performance by the obligor would render the bond void (referred to as the indenture of defeasance), on the back.

At early common law, the penal obligations of bonds were enforced through an action of debt which was concerned with that penal obligation rather than the underlying agreement. In this sense, the enforcement of bonds in the period preceding the modern simplification of pleading was not concerned with contracts principles at all; rather, the enforcement of bonds was a question of "the law of deeds and conditions."

== Early history ==
The penal bond with conditional defeasance (hereinafter referred to as a conditional bond, conditional penal bond, or penal bond) first arose in England during the 1340s/1350s. The conditional bond has been characterized as the dominant method for “framing substantial contracts in the later medieval and early modern periods.” In fact, during the Tudor Period, actions of debt were the most numerous single class of actions in the Common Pleas rolls (and would continue to be so for the next 300 years).

Although an innovation in its structure, the conditional penal bond was not the first English attempt to impose “fixed monetary penalties” for failure to perform on an agreement. Penalty clauses inserted into written contracts, a mainstay in civil law jurisdictions, as well as penal bonds with separate indentures of defeasance were commonly used to secure the performance of a contract until well into the fifteenth century.

Putting the acquittance on the reverse of the bond itself, however, had a number of advantages over its competitors:

1. It “prevented plaintiff [creditor] from pleading that the conditional acquittance or indenture of defeasance [the language which spelled out the condition upon which the obligation to pay the stated sum on the front of the bond was voided] produced by the defendant was not plaintiff’s deed.”
2. Including the condition which made the bond void as part of the same document as the bond prevented the debtor from alleging outlandish conditions in defeasance of the bond.
3. Compurgators were excluded.
4. “Debtors could plead payment without a written acquittance.”
5. “[C]reditors could not take advantage of the conditions of defeasance to avoid being repaid purposely to double the debt.”
6. Courts were willing “to enforce the penalty to the fullest,” but were sensitive to offsets from payments that had been made.
7. Penal bonds “could be made anywhere and without prior approval of royal officials.”

Joseph Biancalana has argued that there was no real advantage inherent in a conditional penal bond as against its competitors, and that therefore its later dominance was attributable to custom and trade practice. Robert Palmer, on the other hand, has argued that “[t]he morality that allowed the extension of penal bonds after the Black Death . . . was part of the governmental concern to preserve traditional society by harshly coercing the upper classes to abide by their obligations.” Irrespective of its merits, the conditional bond did overtake other forms of imposing a penalty for nonperformance of an obligation by the fifteenth century.

At common law, the simple bond “was almost irresistible,” the only defenses available to the debtor being forgery or the production of a sealed acquittance in court. Debtors were not permitted to argue any other defenses including, “payment without taking of a sealed acquittance, payment at another time or place then specified in the bond, failure of consideration, impossibility of performance, or fraud in the underlying transaction.” The debtor who was wrongly made to pay twice, however, could win damages in a writ of trespass for the taking.

Conditional bonds were somewhat easier to contest from the perspective of the obligor. Courts considered performance of the condition a valid defense to the bond. By the mid-sixteenth century, the common law began to recognize a range of limited circumstances “in which non-performance of the condition was excused or a variant performance was held a sufficient defense against the bond.”; see, for example, Abbot of Cerle’s Case. Before the mid-sixteenth century, however, substantial performance (unless accepted as sufficient by the obligee), partial payment, and late payment were not accepted defenses.

== Competition between the common law and Chancery courts ==
The common law was eventually made to compete with the Court of Chancery, which began to pass upon the enforceability of penal bonds. Barrantyne v. Jeckett (1553/54) has been cited as the earliest example of the Court of Chancery giving relief from a penal bond, but by the middle of the sixteenth century, “Chancery was already intervening against penal bonds quite frequently” (34 cases being reported for study in the years 1544–1568, with probably as many passed over as routine, and some falling through the cracks as not recognizable as penal bonds in the records). “By 1582 Chancery’s intervention was even more frequent,” including some 16 bond cases under consideration in the Michaelmas term alone.

Although Chancery was more favorable to the debtor, it still maintained a relatively strict line in these cases: injunctions were not routinely granted “simply on the ground that the penal sum was outrageously disproportionate to the underlying debt.” The 1557 case of Chamberlayn v. Iseham, illustrates this point. In that case, the debtor (now plaintiff in equity) had given a bond to pay a sum of £400, “defeasible if 20 marks (£13 s. 8d.) was paid by a certain date.” Rather than grant an injunction barring the enforcement of the bond on the ground that the sum was grossly disproportionate to the underlying debt, Chancery “felt it necessary to mention special circumstances in the debtor’s favor,” namely that “he was in the service of the king and queen on the day appointed for payment, and had since paid the twenty marks into Chancery to be held for the obligee.”

During the mid-sixteenth century, Chancery sometimes viewed substantial performance of the condition as sufficient reason to justify intervention. This was the outcome in the cases of Rowse v. Wade, Fabyan v. Fuliambe, Atkinson v. Harman, Longe v. Awbery, and Walaston v. Mower.

Beyond these cases, “by about 1562 Chancery was beginning to feel that the law of harsh penalties for small defaults was wrong in principle,” having held on a number of occasions that the defendant obligee could not recover more than his damages, notwithstanding the fact that he could have recovered at common law the entire penal sum irrespective of the amount he had been harmed (“damnified” in the verbiage of the time). This shift led Chancery to grant relief “routinely in a whole class of cases,” rather than just in exceptional cases. Arguably as a result of this routinizing of chancering penal bonds, Chancery's willingness to intervene regularly in penal bonds (starting sometime in the 1580s/90s) shifted from giving injunctions without regard to whether the common law court had passed on the matter (which was the prior practice) to granting injunctions only during a set period of time.

Unsurprisingly, this caused friction between the common law courts and the Court of Chancery, which came to a head in 1614 over whether the Chancery Court could properly issues injunctions in cases upon which the common law courts had already passed judgment. In the case of Courtney v. Glanville and Allen, which grew out of a particularly egregious example of fraud underlying a debt, Chief Justice Coke, judge and leading advocate of the common law, sought to challenge the authority of the Chancery Court to review decisions already made by the common law courts. As the common law courts had already given judgment for Glanville and Allen, Coke argued that the Chancery Court could not properly rule on the case so as to give an injunction which ran contrary to the action of the common law court. Eventually, this particular dispute became wrapped up in a wider rift between common law and Chancery in the Earl of Oxford's case, culminating in a stinging rebuke of the common law courts delivered by King James I, re-affirming the Chancery Court's right and duty to the people to review those decisions of the common law courts which may have been manifestly unjust.

== Later history and decline ==
Chancery's dim view of penalties in excess of damages eventually won out. In 1696, Parliament passed the Administration of Justice Act 1696 (8 & 9 Will. 3. c. 11), which said that "a plaintiff suing upon a bond was allowed to execute on property only up to the value of the damages suffered as a result of the breach." The Administration of Justice Act 1705 (4 & 5 Ann. c. 3) amended the law to say that "payment of damages" was to be considered "a full substitute for the stipulated penalty under the bond." The penal bond, nonetheless, remained popular in the ensuing century "mainly because of procedural advantages – such as a longer statute of limitations – for actions on specialty contracts like bonds, vis-à-vis simple contracts." For bonds, in fact, there was no limitation period before 1833, although payment was presumed after a period of 20 years (reduced to 12 years in 1939). As penal bonds were under seal, preference was also given to them over simple debts in the event of debtor insolvency. Despite these minor advantages, the core fact remained that after “the limitation of the early eighteenth century, regardless of the penalty specified in the bond, the value of the underlying promise represented a ceiling on the plaintiff’s recourse against the defendant.”

Curtis Nyquist reports that "[b]y the eighteenth century, chancering bonds was a regular practice on both sides of the Atlantic, even in common law courts." In Massachusetts, the practice was to give “judgment for only one-half the amount of the bond.” This trend, unsurprisingly, "undermined" the "in terrorem quality of penal bonds," and therefore penal bonds were "used less frequently and no longer played a major role in business practice by [1819]." Despite this fact, "until the beginning of the nineteenth century," "virtually all large business transactions" in the United States were conducted via the mutual exchange of two independent penal bonds.

Over time in the United States, not only were penal bonds regarded as invalid insofar as they imposed liability in excess of damages, all contractual mechanisms that purported to impose a penalty in excess of damages (rather than valid liquidated damages) were regarded as invalid. By 1895, the rule limiting relief to actual damages, and disfavoring penal bonds insofar as they purported to grant more than actual damages, was regarded a positive "[amelioration] of the severity of the common law," and is aptly described in the case of Kelley v. Seay, spinning a story of progress in the law to the point where it was then regarded as a "settled rule that no other sum can be recovered under a penalty than that which shall compensate the plaintiff for his actual loss."

== Legacy ==
Although penal bonds have not been used for hundreds of years, their influence on English jurisprudence continued through the development of the common law rules in relation to penalty clauses. During their review of this area of the law in Cavendish Square Holding BV v Talal El Makdessi the Supreme Court reviewed the relevant history and its effect on subsequent jurisprudence (noting that "[t]he penalty rule in England is an ancient, haphazardly constructed edifice which has not weathered well". With the decline of the use of defeasible bonds the procedural mechanics developed in case law and the Administration of Justice Act 1696 and later the Administration of Justice Act 1705 to protect parties became increasingly applied to liquidated damages clauses, which evolved into the common law doctrine of penalties.
