= Limitation Act 1623 =

Act of the Parliament of England

Limitation Act 1623 (Note: The citation of this act by this short title was authorised by section 1 of, and the first schedule to, the Short Titles Act 1896. Due to the repeal of those provisions it is now authorised by section 19(2) of the Interpretation Act 1978.)
- Act of Parliament
- Parliament of England
- Long title: An Acte for lymytacion of Accions, and for avoyding of Suites in Lawe.
- Citation: 21 Jas. 1. c. 16
- Territorial extent: England and Wales

Dates
- Royal assent: 29 May 1624
- Commencement: 12 February 1624 (Note: Start of session.)
- Repealed: 2 May 1986
Other legislation
Amended by	Administration of Justice Act 1705; Statute of Frauds Amendment Act 1828; Mercantile Law Amendment Act 1856; Statute Law Revision Act 1863; Statute Law Revision Act 1888; Civil Procedure Acts Repeal Act 1879; Statute Law Revision and Civil Procedure Act 1883; Limitation Act 1939
Repealed by	Statute Law (Repeals) Act 1986

Status: Repealed

Text of statute as originally enacted

The Limitation Act 1623 (21 Jas. 1. c. 16), sometimes called the Statute of Limitations 1623, was an act of the Parliament of England.

== Actions to which the act applied ==
=== General application ===
The act applied to all actions to all actions arising out of simple contracts and to all actions of tort at common law except those actions for which there was a special period of limitation provided.

=== Particular instances of simple contract debts ===
The act also applied to the personal remedy on a simple contract debt which was charged on land, where there was no convenient way to pay; to a simple contract debt which was recited in a deed, unless there was in the deed an express or implied contract to pay it; to a warrant of attorney to confess judgment for the amount of a simple contract debt; to an action for mesne profits; to an action against the equitable assignee of leaseholds in possession, grounded on his liability to perform the covenants in the lease; to a set-off or counterclaim; to an action founded on a foreign judgment; and to an Admiralty action for seamen's wages.

=== Actions given by statute ===
An action which a statute expressly enabled to be brought, but which was not an action for a statutory debt, was within the act. Thus, an action against a director of a company under section 84 of the Companies (Consolidation) Act 1908 (8 Edw. 7. c. 69) and the action referred to in section 26 of the Copyhold Act 1894 (57 & 58 Vict. c. 46) were, it seems, within the Limitation Act 1623, as was also a claim for indemnity under section 26 of the Land Transfer Act 1897 (60 & 61 Vict. c. 65)

The act applied to a claim against an executor personally founded on a devastavit and to proceedings to enforce the statutory right which simple contract creditors had against the real estate of their deceased debtors.

=== Provisions of limitations ===
By 1911, the period of limitation for most actions of tort and for all actions arising out of simple contract was six years from the accrual of the cause of action.

== Subsequent developments ==
The act was amended by the Administration of Justice Act 1705 (4 & 5 Ann. c. 3), the Statute of Frauds Amendment Act 1828 (9 Geo. 4. c. 14) and the Mercantile Law Amendment Act 1856 (19 & 20 Vict. c. 97).

Sections 1 and 2 of the act were repealed by section 1 of, and the schedule to, the Statute Law Revision Act 1863 (26 & 27 Vict. c. 125), which came into force on 28 July 1863.

Section 3, 4 and 7 of the act was repealed by section 34(4) of, and the schedule to, the Limitation Act 1939 (2 & 3 Geo. 6. c. 21), which came into force on 1 July 1940.

The whole act was repealed by section 1(1) of, and group 5 of part I of schedule 1 to, the Statute Law (Repeals) Act 1986, which came into force on 2 May 1986.

== See also ==
- Limitation Act
