= Penalties in English law =

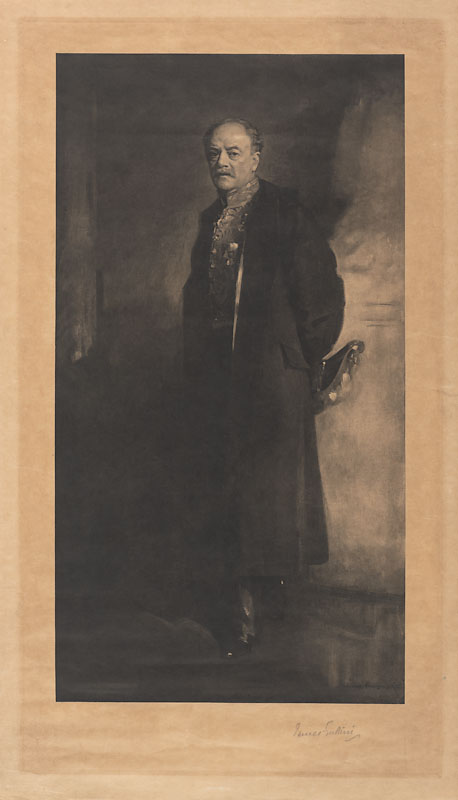
Lord Dunedin, who first tried to rationalise the law on penalties in 1914 in Dunlop Pneumatic Tyre Co Ltd v New Garage & Motor Co Ltd.

Penalties in English law are contractual terms which are not enforceable in the courts because of their penal character. Since at least 1720 it has been accepted as a matter of English contract law that if a provision in a contract constitutes a penalty, then that provision is unenforceable by the parties. However, the test for what constitutes a penalty has evolved over time. The Supreme Court most recently restated the law in relation to contractual penalties in the co-joined appeals of Cavendish Square Holding BV v Talal El Makdessi, and ParkingEye Ltd v Beavis.

The law relating to contractual penalties in England has been entirely developed by judges at common law without general statutory intervention. The Supreme Court has noted that "[t]he penalty rule in England is an ancient, haphazardly constructed edifice which has not weathered well".

However, in addition to the common law rules relating to penalties, there are statutes which make express provision for avoidance of onerous clauses, such as the Unfair Contract Terms Act 1977 and the Unfair Terms in Consumer Contracts Regulations 1999.

== History ==
The origin of the common law rules relating to penalties is often taken to be the decision of the House of Lords in the Dunlop Pneumatic Tyre Co Ltd v New Garage & Motor Co Ltd decision in 1914. But the jurisdiction is actually much older. The oldest reported case relating to penalties appears to date from 1720, but even that case is decided on the basis that penalties were already generally considered unenforceable.

In their decision in Makdessi the Supreme Court reviewed the historical origins of the rule against penalty clauses in contracts. The law originated in the fifteenth century in relation to "defeasible bonds" (sometimes called penal bonds) which were a contractual promise to pay money, which might be discharged if certain obligations were performed (and if the obligations were not performed, then the payment terms under the bond could be enforced). However the courts of equity regarded these as what they really were - security for performance of the underlying obligation - and were prepared to restrain enforcement of such bonds where the defaulting party paid any damages due at common law. In time the courts of common law began to mirror this approach and stay any proceedings on such bonds where the defendant gave an undertaking to pay damages together with interest and costs. The position of the common law courts was adopted and codified in the Administration of Justice Act 1696 (8 & 9 Will. 3. c. 11) and later the Administration of Justice Act 1705 (4 & 5 Ann. c. 3). Accordingly, procedurally relief in relation to such bonds was thereafter administered entirely by the common law courts without intervention by the courts of equity. However, the courts of equity began to develop concurrent remedies for relief from forfeiture. With the decline of the use of defeasible bonds the procedural mechanics became increasingly applied to liquidated damages clauses.

However, the decision in Dunlop in 1914 was taken to authoritatively restate the law. That case concerned what was expressed to be a liquidated damages clause. The courts had to determine whether the clause was in fact a penalty. The leading judgment was given by Lord Dunedin, who opined as follows:

Though the parties to a contract who use the words "penalty" or "liquidated damages" may prima facie be supposed to mean what they say, yet the expression used is not conclusive. The Court must find out whether the payment stipulated is in truth a penalty or liquidated damages.

...

The essence of a penalty is a payment of money stipulated as in terrorem of the offending party; the essence of liquidated damages is a genuine covenanted pre-estimate of damage.

...

It will be held to be penalty if the sum stipulated for is extravagant and unconscionable in amount in comparison with the greatest loss that could conceivably be proved to have followed from the breach.

...

It is no obstacle to the sum stipulated being a genuine pre-estimate of damage, that the consequences of the breach are such as to make precise pre-estimation almost an impossibility. On the contrary, that is just the situation when it is probable that pre-estimated damage was the true bargain between the parties.

== Difficulties with the rule ==
The rule is one which judges over the years have confessed difficulty with. In Astley v Weldon Lord Eldon admitted ("not for the first time" according to the Supreme Court in Makdessi) to being "much embarrassed in ascertaining the principle on which [the rule was] founded". In Wallis v Smith, Sir George Jessel MR similarly confessed: "The ground of that doctrine I do not know". In Robophone Facilities Ltd v Blank Diplock LJ famously said that he would make "no attempt where so many others have failed to rationalise this common law rule".

Although the decision of Lord Dunedin sought to bring greater clarity to the law in 1914, in practice it often proved difficult to apply. Cases continued to come before the courts challenging provisions as a penalty, and the courts continued to wrestle with the issue. In Workers Trust & Merchant Bank Ltd v Dojap Investments Ltd Lord Browne Wilkinson tried to describe the scope of the law of penalties, and noted the slightly anomalous rules in relation to forfeiture of deposits in relation to sales of land: "In general a contractual provision which requires one party in the event of his breach of contract to pay or forfeit a sum of money to the other party is unlawful as being a penalty, unless such provision can be justified as being a payment of liquidated damages being a genuine pre-estimate of the loss which the innocent party will incur by reason of the breach. One exception to this general rule is the provision for the payment of a deposit (customarily 10% of the contract price) on the sale of land..."

In the course of their exhaustive review of earlier authorities in Makdessi, the Supreme Court sorted through a large variety of obiter dicta relating to penalties, many of which they considered doubtful, misinterpretations of earlier decisions, or simply capable of being misconstrued.

== Change in approach ==
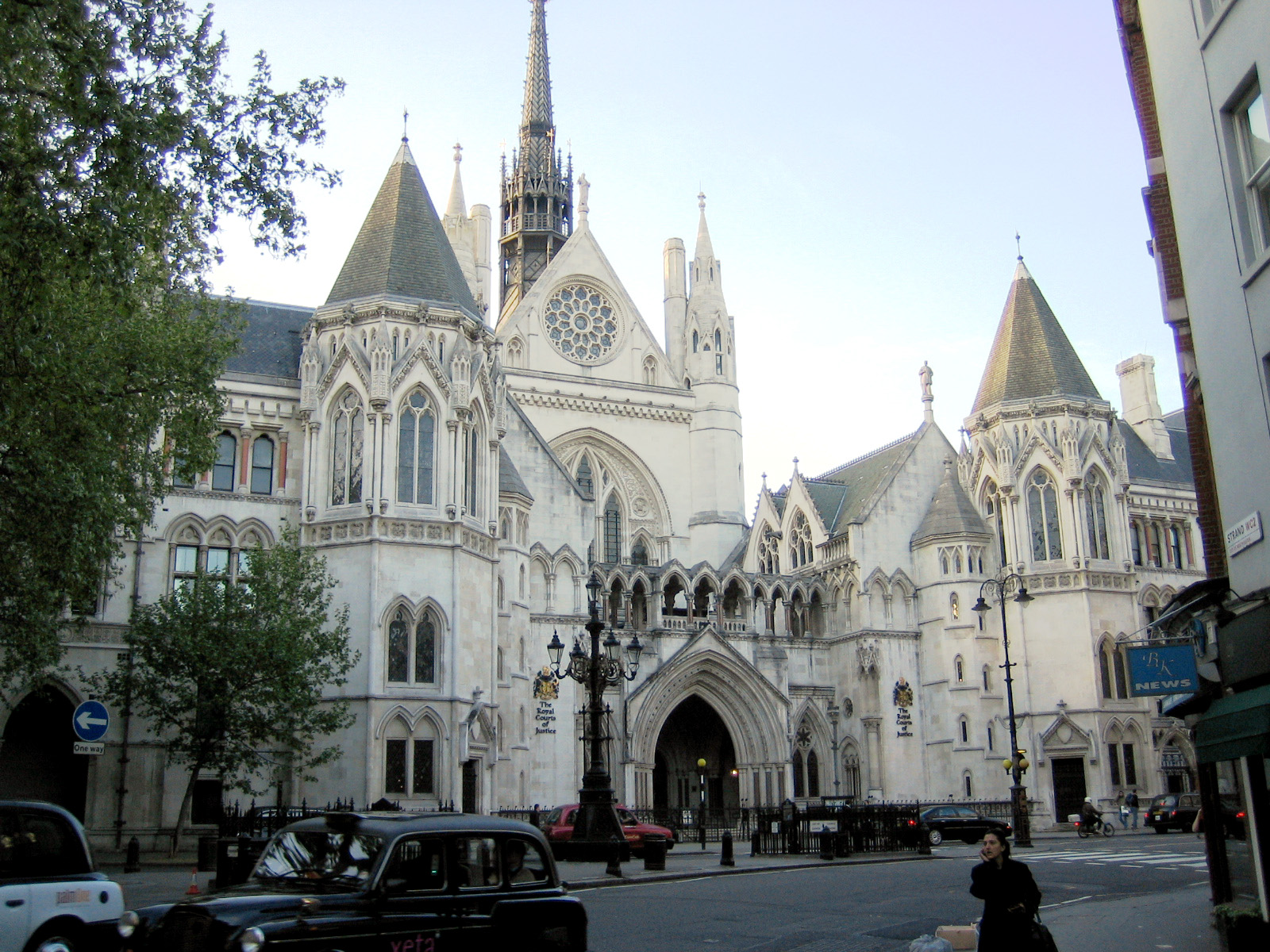
English law relating to contractual penalties has been almost entirely developed by judges.

In more recent cases the courts have taken a considerably more relaxed approach in relation to penalties. In Philips Hong Kong Ltd v AG of Hong Kong the Privy Council expressly endorsed the comments of Dickson J in the Supreme Court of Canada in Elsey v J.G. Collins Insurance Agencies Ltd that:

... the power to strike down a penalty clause is a blatant interference with freedom of contract and is designed for the sole purpose of providing relief against oppression for the party having to pay the stipulated sum. It has no place where there is no oppression.

However, the approbation by the Privy Council did not move the editors of Chitty on Contracts in relation to the point of law. Subsequent to the publication of that edition of Chitty the Court of Appeal expressly replicated that statement. But even the editors of Chitty have acknowledged that their own preferred test of the requirement of genuine pre-estimate of loss has become very flexible.

In 2005 Jackson LJ in Alfred McAlpine Projects v Tilebox noted that he had only seen four reported cases where a clause has been struck down as a penalty. In the same year Arden LJ, giving the judgment of the Court of Appeal in Murray v Leisureplay plc set out a series of five questions which the court should consider in relation to penalties:

1. To what breaches of contract does the contractual damages provision apply?
2. What amount is payable on breach under that clause in the parties' agreement?
3. What amount would be payable if a claim for damages for breach of contract was brought under common law?
4. What were the parties' reasons for agreeing for the relevant clause?
5. Has the party who seeks to establish that the clause is a penalty shown that the amount payable under the clause was imposed in terrorem, or that it does not constitute a genuine pre-estimate of loss for the purposes of the Dunlop case, and, if he has shown the latter, is there some other reason which justifies the discrepancy between i) and ii) above?

In Azimut-Benetti SpA v Healey the court has to consider a provision whereby a boat builder was entitled to terminate for non-payment of instalments and to claim 20% of the contracted price as liquidated damages. Upholding the clause, Clarke J said that commercially justifiable clauses should be enforceable provided the dominant purpose is not to deter the other party from breach. On the facts, it was clear that the purpose of the clause was to set out a pre-determined commercial solution in the event that the buyer defaulted.

== The current position – Cavendish Square Holdings BV v Makdessi ==
In November 2015 the Supreme Court held joint appeals in the matter of Cavendish Square Holding BV v Talal El Makdessi and ParkingEye Ltd v Beavis, and took the opportunity to restate the law in a lengthy judgment. The leading judgment was a joint judgment of Lord Neuberger and Lord Sumption, but the court was unanimous save that Lord Toulson dissented in part on the ParkingEye decision. Their Lordships recounted the relevant legal history, noting that the law originated in cases relating to "penal bonds", and noting the parallel developments between the rule against penalties (in the common law courts) and relief from forfeiture (in the equitable courts). After noting the rule had "not weathered well", their Lordships recorded that in relation to consumer contracts the matter was now effectively regulated by the Unfair Terms in Consumer Contracts Regulations. However the rule on penalties still had a purpose to serve in relation to non-consumer contracts and it should not, therefore, be abolished. But equally the court felt that it should not be extended.

The Supreme Court then reformulated the common law test for what constitutes an unenforceable penalty clause. They held that the validity of such a clause turned on whether the party seeking to enforce the clause could claim a legitimate interest in the enforcement of the clause:

The true test is whether the impugned provision is a secondary obligation which imposes a detriment on the contract-breaker out of all proportion to any legitimate interest of the innocent party in the enforcement of the primary obligation. The innocent party can have no proper interest in simply punishing the defaulter. His interest is in performance or in some appropriate alternative to performance.
...
The penalty rule is an interference with freedom of contract. It undermines the certainty which parties are entitled to expect of the law. Diplock LJ was neither the first nor the last to observe that "The court should not be astute to descry a 'penalty clause'": Robophone at p 1447. As Lord Woolf said, speaking for the Privy Council in Philips Hong Kong Ltd v Attorney General of Hong Kong (1993) 61 BLR 41, 59, "the court has to be careful not to set too stringent a standard and bear in mind that what the parties have agreed should normally be upheld", not least because "[a]ny other approach will lead to undesirable uncertainty especially in commercial contracts".

Accordingly, the reformulated test has essentially two elements:

1. is any legitimate business-interest protected by the clause; and
2. if so, is the provision made in the clause extravagant, exorbitant or unconscionable?

The Supreme Court also affirmed that the rule against penalties will only apply to secondary obligations, i.e. obligations which arise upon breach of a primary obligation. A clause which stipulates onerous provisions in a contract may be onerous, but unless it is triggered by breach it is not a penalty in the eyes of the law. Their Lordships also observed that a penalty clause may often be simple payment of money, but it could also encompass other things, such as the withholding of payments, requirements to transfer assets, or (on the facts before them) a requirement to repay a non-refundable deposit.

A case addressed in the Court of Appeal in parallel with Cavendish and ParkingEye and recognising the relevance of this legal development, Edgeworth Capital (Luxembourg) SARL v Ramblas Investments BV, found that a provision for payment of a financing fee should not be treated as an unenforceable penalty clause, but was to be treated as a fee payable in specific circumstances which "had nothing to do with damages for breach of contract".

== Requirement for breach ==
A clause which provides for a large payment in pursuant of the performance of obligations is not a penalty at law. In Berg v Blackburn Rovers FC it was held that where a football club exercised its right to terminate employment of a manager upon payment out of the remaining salary due under the contract, this was the performance of a term and not a provision designed to constrain breach. Accordingly, it could not be a penalty. For English law this position was reaffirmed by the Supreme Court in the Makdessi decision.

The Supreme Court's ruling in respect of the ambit of the penalty rule represents the clear contrast between Australian and UK contract law. In 2012, the High Court of Australia concluded that a provision can be a penalty even if it is not triggered by a breach of contract. The court held that in general terms,' a stipulation prima facie imposes a penalty on a party ("the first party") if, as a matter of substance, it is collateral (or accessory) to aprimary stipulation in favour of a second party and this collateral stipulation, upon the failure of the primary stipulation, imposes upon the first party an additional detriment, the penalty, to the benefit of the second party'. In 2014, the Federal Court of Australia clarified and constrained the limits of the "Andrew's Test", noting that the loss must be "extravagant or unconscionable" compared with the greatest calculation of the proved loss in order to trigger the doctrine.

== Effect ==
Cases referring to penalty clauses use the words "void" and "unenforceable" interchangeably. In the High Court of Australia in the decision of AMEV-UDC Finance Ltd v Austin, Mason and Wilson JJ stated: "At least since the advent of the Judicature system a penalty provision has been regarded as unenforceable or, perhaps void, ab initio". (emphasis added)

Because an allegation that a clause constitutes a penalty is usually raised as a defence to a contractual claim, there is no practical difference. However, if a party were to pay out under such a clause and then seek the return of the money paid, then clearly it would be material to establish whether the clause was merely unenforceable (in which case the money could not be claimed back) or void (in which case it could).

In Makdessi the Supreme Court stuck scrupulously to the word "unenforceable" but they also noted that Mr Makdessi had claimed that the clause was "void and unenforceable", but did not expressly comment upon whether it might be void (and did not need to do so, as they held it was not a penalty).

== See also ==
- Penal damages
