= Admiralty, &c. Acts Repeal Act 1865 =

Act of the Parliament of the United Kingdom

Admiralty, &c. Acts Repeal Act 1865 (Note: Section 4.)
- Act of Parliament
- Parliament of the United Kingdom
- Long title: An Act to repeal Enactments relating to Powers of the Commissioners of Admiralty, and to various Matters under the Control of the Admiralty.
- Citation: 28 & 29 Vict. c. 112
- Territorial extent: United Kingdom

Dates
- Royal assent: 5 July 1865
- Commencement: 1 January 1865 (Note: Section 2.)
- Repealed: 23 May 1950
Other legislation
Amends	See § Repealed enactments
Repeals/revokes	See § Repealed enactments
Amended by	Naval Stores Act 1867
Repealed by	Statute Law Revision Act 1950

Status: Repealed

Text of statute as originally enacted

The Admiralty, &c. Acts Repeal Act 1865 (28 & 29 Vict. c. 112) was an act of the Parliament of the United Kingdom that repealed various enactments relating to the Admiralty of the United Kingdom.

== Provisions ==
=== Repealed enactments ===
Section 1 of the act repealed 23 enactments, listed in the schedule to the act.

Citation	Short title	Description	Extent of repeal
9 Will. 3. c. 41 (Note: This is the citation in The Statutes of the Realm.)	Embezzlement of Public Stores Act 1697	An Act for the better preventing the Imbezlement of His Majesty's Stores of War, and preventing Cheats, Frauds, and Abuses in paying Seamen's Wages.	The whole act. (Note: The Naval Stores Act 1867 (30 & 31 Vict. c 119) unrepealed sections 1, 2, 4, 5 and 8 of the act.)
4 & 5 Ann. c. 3	Administration of Justice Act 1705	An Act for the Amendment of the Law and the better Advancement of Justice	Section Twenty-six.
9 Geo. 3. c. 30	Navy Act 1769	An Act for repealing so much of an Act passed in the Tenth Year of Her late Majesty Queen Anne as relates to the Harbour Moorings of the Royal Navy, and for the more effectual Preservation of such Moorings, and Punishment of Persons guilty of stealing or embezzling Her Majesty's Naval Stores, or of Forgery or Perjury in relation to Seamen's Wages.	The whole act.
54 Geo. 3. c. 159	Harbours Act 1814	An Act for the better Regulation of the several Ports, Harbours, Roadsteads, Sounds, Channels, Bays, and navigable Rivers in the United Kingdom, and of His Majesty's Docks, Dockyards, Arsenals, Wharfs, Moorings, and Stores therein; and for repealing several Acts passed for that Purpose	Sections Two to Nine and Seventeen to Twenty (all inclusive).
57 Geo. 3. c. 118	Navy Prize Money, etc. Act 1817	An Act for authorizing the Executors or Administrators of deceased licensed Navy Agents to receive Prize Money, Bounty Money, and other Allowances of Money upon Orders given to such deceased Agents.	The whole act.
59 Geo. 3. c. 56	Navy Prize Orders Act 1819	An Act to make further Regulations as to the Payment of Navy Prize Orders.	The whole act.
59 Geo. 3. c. 59	Wages of Certain Deceased Seamen Act 1819	An Act to extend the Provisions of an Act made in the Fifty-fifth Year of His present Majesty, for the Payment of Wages due to deceased Seamen and Marines, to Wages due to intestate Bastards.	The whole act.
1 Geo. 4. c. 85	Naval Prize Money Act 1820	An Act to make further Provisions respecting Naval Prize Money.	The whole act.
1 & 2 Geo. 4. c. 93	Property Occupied for Naval Service, etc. Act 1821	An Act for vesting all Estates and Property occupied by or for the Naval Service of this Kingdom in the Principal Officers and Commissioners of His Majesty's Navy, and for granting certain Powers to the said Principal Officers and Commissioners.	The whole act.
10 Geo. 4. c. 26	Greenwich Hospital Outpensions, etc. Act 1829	An Act for transferring the Management of Greenwich Out-Pensions and certain Duties in Matters of Prize to the Treasurer of the Navy	Sections Eleven, Thirteen, Fourteen, and Thirty-two.
11 Geo. 4. & 1 Will. 4. c. 20	Pay of the Navy Act 1830	An Act to amend and consolidate the Laws relating to the Pay of the Royal Navy	Except Section Eighty.
11 Geo. 4. & 1 Will. 4. c. 41	Army Pensions Act 1830	An Act to make further Regulations with respect to Army Pensions	Section Three as far as relates to Naval or Marine Pensions.
2 & 3 Will. 4. c. 40	Admiralty Act 1832	An Act to amend the Laws relating to the Business of the Civil Department of the Navy, and to make other Regulations for more effectually carrying on the Duties of the said Department	Except Sections One, Five, Six, and Seven.
4 & 5 Will. 4. c. 25	Navy Pay Act 1834	An Act to alter and amend the Provisions of an Act passed in the Eleventh Year of the Reign of His late Majesty King George the Fourth, for amending and consolidating the Laws relating to the Pay of the Royal Navy.	The whole act.
5 & 6 Will. 4. c. 24	Naval Enlistment Act 1835	An Act for the Encouragement of the voluntary Enlistment of Seamen and to make Regulations for more effectually manning Her Majesty's Navy	Section Seven.
7 Will. 4. & 1 Vict. c. 26	Wills Act 1837	An Act for the Amendment of the Laws with respect to Wills	Section Twelve.
5 Vict. c. 3	Navy Pay Act 1841	An Act to alter an Act of the Eleventh Year of King George the Fourth, for amending the Laws relating to the Pay of the Royal Navy, and an Act of the Fifth Year of King William the Fourth, to alter the Provisions of the said Act.	The whole act.
6 & 7 Vict. c. 58	Admiralty Lands Act 1843	An Act to enable Her Majesty to acquire Lands for the Enlargement of Her Majesty's Dockyards and for other Naval Purposes.	The whole act.
13 & 14 Vict. c. 62	Navy Pay Act 1850	An Act to alter and extend an Act passed in the Eleventh Year of King George the Fourth, for amending and consolidating the Laws relating to the Pay of the Royal Navy.	The whole act.
15 & 16 Vict. c. 46	Navy Pay Act 1852	An Act to amend an Act of the Eleventh Year of King George the Fourth for amending and consolidating the Laws relating to the Pay of the Royal Navy.	The whole act.
16 & 17 Vict. c. 69	Naval Enlistment Act 1853	An Act to make better Provision concerning the Entry and Service of Seamen, and otherwise to amend the Laws concerning Her Majesty's Navy	Sections Three, Eleven, and Nineteen.
17 & 18 Vict. c. 19	Naval Pay and Prize Act 1854	An Act for facilitating the Payment of Her Majesty's Navy, and the Payment and Distribution of Prize Bounty, Salvage, and other Moneys to and amongst the Officers and Crews of Her Majesty's Ships and Vessels of War, and for the better Regulation of the Accounts relating thereto	Section Thirteen.
26 & 27 Vict. c. 30	Dockyards Protection Act Amendment Act 1863	An Act to authorize further Harbour Regulations for the Protection of Her Majesty's Ships, Dockyards, and Naval Stations.	The whole act.

== Subsequent developments ==
Section 20 of the Naval Stores Act 1867 (30 & 31 Vict. c 119) provided that the repeal by this act of sections 1, 2, 4, 5 and 8 of the Embezzlement of Public Stores Act 1697 (9 Will. 3. c. 41), was thereby repealed as far as those sections related to any stores except naval or victualling stores, or other stores belonging to or under the charge or control of the Admiralty, or to Scotland or Ireland, and that to that extent those sections were thereby revived; but that nothing therein contained was to interfere with the operation of any other act of the session 30 & 31 Vict.

The whole act was repealed for the United Kingdom by section 1(1) of, and the first schedule to, the Statute Law Revision Act 1950 (14 Geo. 6. c. 6), which came into force on 23 May 1950.

The act was retained for the Republic of Ireland by section 2(2)(a) of, and part 4 of schedule 1 to, the Statute Law Revision Act 2007, which came into force on 8 May 2007.

== Bibliography ==
- Paterson, William. The Practical Statutes of the Session 1865. Horace Cox. London. 1865. Pages 270 et seq. Digitized copy from Google Books.
