= Administration of Justice Act =

Stock short title for UK legislation

Administration of Justice Act (with its variations) is a stock short title used for legislation in the United Kingdom relating to the administration of justice. The Bill for an Act with this short title may have been known as a Administration of Justice Bill during its passage through Parliament. Administration of Justice Acts may be a generic name either for legislation bearing that short title or for all legislation which relates to procedural law.

== List ==
=== United Kingdom ===
The Administration of Justice Act 1696 (8 & 9 Will. 3. c. 25)
The Administration of Justice Act 1705 (4 & 5 Ann. c. 3)
The Administration of Justice Act 1774 (14 Geo. 3. c. 39)
The Administration of Justice Act 1813 (53 Geo. 3. c. 24)
The Administration of Justice Act 1841 (5 Vict. c. 5)
The Administration of Justice Act 1920 (10 & 11 Geo. 5. c. 81)
The Administration of Justice Act 1925 (15 & 16 Geo. 5. c. 28)
The Administration of Justice Act 1928 (18 & 19 Geo. 5. c. 26)
The Administration of Justice Act 1932 (22 & 23 Geo. 5. c. 55)
The Administration of Justice (Miscellaneous Provisions) Act 1933 (23 & 24 Geo. 5. c. 36)
The Administration of Justice (Appeals) Act 1934 (24 & 25 Geo. 5. c. 40)
The Administration of Justice (Miscellaneous Provisions) Act 1938 (1 & 2 Geo. 6. c. 63)
The Administration of Justice (Pensions) Act 1950 (14 & 15 Geo. 6. c. 11)
The Administration of Justice Act 1956 (4 & 5 Eliz. 2. c. 46)
The Administration of Justice Act 1960 (8 & 9 Eliz. 2. c. 65)
The Administration of Justice Act 1964 (c. 42)
The Administration of Justice Act 1965 (c. 2)
The Administration of Justice Act 1968 (c. 5)
The Administration of Justice Act 1969 (c. 58)
The Administration of Justice Act 1970 (c. 31)
The Administration of Justice Act 1973 (c. 15)
The Administration of Justice Act 1977 (c. 38)
The Administration of Justice Act 1982 (c. 53)
The Administration of Justice Act 1985 (c. 61)

==== Scotland ====
The Administration of Justice (Scotland) Act 1933 (23 & 24 Geo. 5. c. 41)
The Administration of Justice (Scotland) Act 1972 (c. 59)

==== Northern Ireland ====
The Administration of Justice (Language) Act (Ireland) 1737 (11 Geo. 2. c. 6 (I))
The Administration of Justice Act (Northern Ireland) 1954 (c. 9 (N.I.))

== See also ==
- List of short titles
