= Civil Procedure Acts Repeal Act 1879 =

Act of the Parliament of the United Kingdom

Civil Procedure Acts Repeal Act 1879 (Note: Section 1.)
- Act of Parliament
- Parliament of the United Kingdom
- Long title: An Act for repealing certain Enactments relating to Civil Procedure which have ceased to be in force, or have become unnecessary, and for abolishing Outlawry in Civil Proceedings.
- Citation: 42 & 43 Vict. c. 59
- Introduced by: Hugh Cairns, 1st Earl Cairns (Lords)
- Territorial extent: United Kingdom

Dates
- Royal assent: 15 August 1879
- Commencement: 15 August 1879 (Note: The Acts of Parliament (Commencement) Act 1793.)
- Repealed: 23 July 1958
Other legislation
Amends	See § Repealed enactments
Repeals/revokes	See § Repealed enactments
Amended by	Statute Law Revision and Civil Procedure Act 1883; Statute Law Revision Act 1894; Statute Law Revision Act 1898
Repealed by	Statute Law Revision Act 1958
Relates to	Repeal of Obsolete Statutes Act 1856; See Statute Law Revision Act

Status: Repealed

History of passage through Parliament

Records of Parliamentary debate relating to the statute from Hansard

Text of statute as originally enacted

The Civil Procedure Acts Repeal Act 1879 (42 & 43 Vict. c. 59) was an act of the Parliament of the United Kingdom that repealed for the United Kingdom enactments relating to civil procedure from 1235 to 1852 which had ceased to be in force or had become necessary. The act also abolished the offence of outlawry in English civil law. The act was intended, in particular, to facilitate the preparation of the revised edition of the statutes, then in progress.

Section 7 of the Statute Law Revision and Civil Procedure Act 1883 (46 & 47 Vict. c. 49) provided that if and so far as any enactment repealed by this act applied, or may have been by Order in Council applied, to the Court of the County Palatine of Lancaster, or to any inferior court of civil jurisdiction, such enactment was to be construed as if it were contained in a local and personal act specially relating to such court, and was to have effect accordingly.

== Background ==
In the United Kingdom, acts of Parliament remain in force until expressly repealed. Blackstone's Commentaries on the Laws of England, published in the late 18th-century, raised questions about the system and structure of the common law and the poor drafting and disorder of the existing statute book.

From 1810 to 1825, The Statutes of the Realm was published, providing the first authoritative collection of acts. The first statute law revision act was not passed until 1856 with the Repeal of Obsolete Statutes Act 1856 (19 & 20 Vict. c. 64). This approach — focusing on removing obsolete laws from the statute book followed by consolidation — was proposed by Peter Locke King MP, who had been highly critical of previous commissions' approaches, expenditures, and lack of results.

Previous statute law revision acts
Year passed	Title	Citation	Effect
1861	Statute Law Revision Act 1861	24 & 25 Vict. c. 101	Repealed or amended over 800 enactments
1863	Statute Law Revision Act 1863	26 & 27 Vict. c. 125	Repealed or amended over 1,600 enactments for England and Wales
1867	Statute Law Revision Act 1867	30 & 31 Vict. c. 59	Repealed or amended over 1,380 enactments
1870	Statute Law Revision Act 1870	33 & 34 Vict. c. 69	Repealed or amended over 250 enactments
1871	Promissory Oaths Act 1871	34 & 35 Vict. c. 48	Repealed or amended almost 200 enactments
1871	Statute Law Revision Act 1871	34 & 35 Vict. c. 116	Repealed or amended over 1,060 enactments
1872	Statute Law Revision Act 1872	35 & 36 Vict. c. 63	Repealed or amended almost 490 enactments
1872	Statute Law (Ireland) Revision Act 1872	35 & 36 Vict. c. 98	Repealed or amended over 1,050 enactments
1872	Statute Law Revision Act 1872 (No. 2)	35 & 36 Vict. c. 97	Repealed or amended almost 260 enactments
1873	Statute Law Revision Act 1873	36 & 37 Vict. c. 91	Repealed or amended 1,225 enactments
1874	Statute Law Revision Act 1874	37 & 38 Vict. c. 35	Repealed or amended over 490 enactments
1874	Statute Law Revision Act 1874 (No. 2)	37 & 38 Vict. c. 96	Repealed or amended almost 470 enactments
1875	Statute Law Revision Act 1875	38 & 39 Vict. c. 66	Repealed or amended over 1,400 enactments
1876	Statute Law Revision (Substituted Enactments) Act 1876	39 & 40 Vict. c. 20	Updated references to repealed acts
1878	Statute Law Revision (Ireland) Act 1878	41 & 42 Vict. c. 57	Repealed or amended over 460 enactments passed by the Parliament of Ireland
1878	Statute Law Revision Act 1878	41 & 42 Vict. c. 79	Repealed or amended over 90 enactments.
1879	Statute Law Revision (Ireland) Act 1879	42 & 43 Vict. c. 24	Repealed or amended over 460 enactments passed by the Parliament of Ireland

In the 1870s, the passing of the Judicature Acts virtually repealed or superseded certain enactments and rules of the court.

== Passage ==
The Civil Procedure Acts Repeal Bill had its first reading in the House of Lords on 27 June 1879, introduced by the Lord Chancellor, Hugh Cairns, 1st Earl Cairns. The bill had its second reading in the House of Lords on 11 July 1879 and was committed to a committee of the whole house, which met and reported on 14 July 1879, without amendments. The bill had its third reading in the House of Lords on 15 July 1879 and passed, without amendments.

The bill had its first reading in the House of Commons on 21 July 1879. The bill had its second reading in the House of Commons on 24 July 1879 and was committed to a committee of the whole house, which met on 4 August 1879 and 8 August 1879 and reported on 8 August 1879, with amendments. The amended bill had its third reading in the House of Commons on 10 May 1879 and passed, with amendments.

The amended bill was considered and agreed to by the House of Lords on 12 August 1879.

The bill was granted royal assent on 15 August 1879.

== Subsequent developments ==
The act was intended, in particular, to facilitate the preparation of the revised edition of the statutes, then in progress, as well as the Consolidated "Rules of the Supreme Court, 1883".

Several enactments mentioned in Part II of the schedule were repealed by the Statute Law Revision and Civil Procedure Act 1881 (44 & 45 Vict. c. 59). The enactments mentioned in Part II of the schedule were repealed by section 4 of the Statute Law Revision and Civil Procedure Act 1883 (46 & 47 Vict. c. 49). The repeal of these enactments was criticised for their complexity, specifically where multiple enactments served the same purpose, serving to "incumber the Statute-book". For example, the Supreme Court of Judicature received powers under the Insolvent Debtors Relief (No. 2) Act 1728 (2 Geo. 2. c. 22) and the Set-off Act 1734 (8 Geo. 2. c. 24) that established the right of set-off for mutual debts in legal actions, through the Rules of Court 1875, and the County Court through the County Court Rules in 1876. These acts were affected by the Civil Procedure Repeal Act 1879 (42 & 43 Vict. c. 59) and these provisions were further extended to the Court of the County Palatine of Lancaster and other inferior civil courts by section 7 of the act.

The preamble, section 3 from the beginning of this section to the word "Act" and the schedule were repealed by section 1 of, and the first schedule to, the Statute Law Revision Act 1894 (57 & 58 Vict. c. 54), which came into force on 25 August 1894.

Section 4(2), the words from "and shall not" to the end and Section 4(3) were repealed by section 1 of, and the first part of the schedule to, the Statute Law Revision Act 1898 (61 & 62 Vict. c. 22), which came into force on 25 July 1898.

The whole act was repealed by section 1 of, and the first schedule to, the Statute Law Revision Act 1958 (6 & 7 Eliz. 2. c. 46), which came into force on 23 July 1958.

The act was retained for the Republic of Ireland by section 2(2)(a) of, and part 4 of schedule 1 to, the Statute Law Revision Act 2007, which came into force on 8 May 2007.

The repeals in this act resulted in several court cases. As to sections 2 and 4, see Snelling v Pulling. As to section 4(1), see Hanak v Green.

== Repealed enactments ==
Section 2 of the act repealed 132 enactments, listed in the schedule to the act.

Section 3 of the act abolished the punishment of outlawry and waiver in civil proceedings.

Section 4 of the act provided that the repeal would not affect: (a) anything done before the act's passing, (b) any established jurisdiction, principle, or rule of law or equity, (c) any right to hereditary revenues of the Crown or charges thereon, (d) any repeal, confirmation, revival, or perpetuation by previous enactments, and (e) the application of any repealed enactment in other legislation. The section further provided that the repeal would not extend to any part of Her Majesty's dominions outside the United Kingdom, and would only operate in respect of the Supreme Court of Judicature in England. Additionally, the act would not revive or restore any jurisdiction, office, duty, fee, payment, franchise, liberty, custom, right, title, privilege, restriction, exemption, usage, practice, procedure, or other matter not existing at the time of passing.

Enactments repealed generally
Citation	Short title	Title	Extent of repeal
20 Hen. 3. c. 10	Attorneys in county courts	The Provisions of Merton. Chapter Ten. Attorneys in County Courts.	The whole act.
40 Hen. 3. Stat. Bissex	Provisio de Anno Bisextili et Die	A Provision for the Day in Leap Year. The extra Day in Leap Year and the Day preceding shall be reckoned as one Day.	The whole act.
52 Hen. 3. c. 18	Amercements for default of summons	The Statute of Marlborough. Chapter Eighteen. Amercements for Defaults restrained.	The whole act.
52 Hen. 3. c. 19	Plea of false judgment	The Statute of Marlborough. Chapter Nineteen. Pleas of False Judgment confined to the King's Courts.	The whole act.
52 Hen. 3. c. 20	Essoins	The Statute of Marlborough. Chapter Twenty. In County Courts, &c. Essoins need not be sworn.	The whole act.
52 Hen. 3. c. 28	Prelates	The Statute of Marlborough. Chapter Twenty-eight. Prelates, &c. may prosecute for Wrongs done to their Predecessors, and in time of vacation.	The whole act.
3 Edw. 1. c. 21	Lands in ward	The Statutes of Westminster, the First. Chapter Twenty-one. Lands in Ward shall be duly kept.	The whole act.
3 Edw. 1. c. 24	Unlawful disseisin by escheators, etc.	The Statutes of Westminster, the First. Chapter Twenty-four. Unlawful Disseisin by Escheators, &c.	The whole act.
3 Edw. 1. c. 35	Excess of jurisdiction in franchises	The Statutes of Westminster, the First. Chapter Thirty-five. Excess of Jurisdiction in Franchises.	The whole act.
6 Edw. 1. c. 1	Franchise Act 1278	The Statutes of Gloucester. Chapter One. Damages in Novel Disseisin. In Mort d'Auncestor. Cosinage, &c. When Damages shall be recovered then costs also. Damages generally.	From "And whereas before Time" to "recover Damages."
6 Edw. 1. c. 5	Actions of waste	The Statutes of Gloucester. Chapter Five. Action of Waste extended.	The whole act.
6 Edw. 1. c. 8	Actions Act 1278	The Statutes of Gloucester. Chapter Eight. In what Court Pleas of Trespass shall be. Defendants may plead by Attorneys. Essoins by Plaintiffs. Defendants.	The whole act.
12 Edw. 1	Provisiones facete in Scaccario	Provisions made in the Exchequer, otherwise called the Statute of Rutland.	From "But for so much as certain Pleas" to "Ministers aforesaid," being the part described in the following marginal abstract: "No suit shall be prosecuted in the Exchequer unless it concern the King or his Officers there."
13 Edw. 1. c. 10	Suits Before Justices in Eyre Act 1285	The Statutes of Westminster, the Second. Chapter Ten. Time of the delivering of Writs for Suits depending before Justices in Eyre. Any Person may make a General Attorney in Eyre.	The whole act.
13 Edw. 1. c. 14	Actions of waste	The Statutes of Westminster, the Second. Chapter Fourteen. The Process in an Action of Waste. A Writ of Inquiry of Waste.	The whole act.
13 Edw. 1. c. 22	Actions of waste	The Statutes of Westminster, the Second. Chapter Twenty-two. Waste between Joint Tenants and Tenants in common.	The whole act.
13 Edw. 1. c. 29	Writs of trespass, etc.	The Statutes of Westminster, the Second. Chapter Twenty-nine. To whom and in what cases Commissions to hear and determine shall be granted. A Writ of Odio et Atia.	The whole act.
13 Edw. 1. c. 35	Punishment of him that taketh away a ward	The Statutes of Westminster, the Second. Chapter Thirty-five. Punishment of him that taketh away a Ward. Writ of ravishment of Ward. In the proper County. Process against an Offender. Writ, if the Heir be carried into another County. Death of the Heir before the Suit ended. Death of the Plaintiff. Death of the Defendant. Resummons in Communi Custodia. The like in Ejectione Custodiae.	From "thereupon the Plaintiff shall have such a Writ," to the End of the Chapter.
13 Edw. 1. c. 36	Procurement of Suits Act 1285	The Statutes of Westminster, the Second. Chapter Thirty-six. Penalty for procurement of Suits in Courts Baron, County Courts, &c.	The whole act.
13 Edw. 1. c. 50	Commencement of statutes	The Statutes of Westminster, the Second. Chapter Fifty. Commencement of the foregoing Statutes.	The whole act.
18 Edw. 1	Statutum de Quo Warranto	The Statute of Quo Warranto. How Writs of Quo Warranto ought to be determined and pleaded in future. Liberties by Prescription. Liberties by Charter. Pleas of Quo Warranto shall be determined on Circuit.	The whole act.
18 Edw. 1	Statutum de Quo Warranto Novum	Another new Statute of Quo Warranto. Liberties by Prescription or the King's Grant.	The whole act.
25 Edw. 1. c. 11	Magna Carta	Magna Carta. Chapter Eleven. Common Pleas.	The whole act.
25 Edw. 1. c. 12	Circuits	Magna Carta. Chapter Twelve. Assises of Novel Disseisin and Mort d'Ancestor. Circuits. Adjournment of Causes for Difficulty.	The whole act.
27 Edw. 1. (Ordin. de Lib. Per.)	Ordinatio de Libertatibus perquirendis	An Ordinance of purchasing Liberties. Chapter Five. Attorneys of Sick Persons, &c.	The whole act.
28 Edw. 1. c. 3	Inquests within Verge, etc. Act 1300	Articles upon the Charters. Chapter Three. Of what things only the Steward and Marshal of the King's House shall hold Plea. What Coroners shall inquire of the Death of a Man slain within the Rape.	From the beginning of the Chapter to "it shall be holden as void."
28 Edw. 1. c. 6	Common law writs	Articles upon the Charters. Chapter Six. No Common Law Writ under the Petty Seal.	The whole act.
Temp. incert. Stat. de Ward' et Releviis	Statutum de Wardis et Releviis	Statute concerning Wards and Reliefs. Relief and Wardship co-relative. Serjeanty. Sokemen. Writs of Ward; in case of Knight's Service. Socage to demand the Laud and Heir; where there are two Lords; to demand the Heir only.	The whole act.
1 Edw. 3. Stat. 1. c. 4	False Judgment	Statute the First. Chapter Four. Averment against the Record in a Writ of False Judgment.	The whole act.
2 Edw. 3. c. 16	Inquests	Statute made at Northampton. Chapter Sixteen. Inquests in the Country shall be granted on Request of the Tenant.	The whole act.
5 Edw. 3. c. 12	Outlawry	Statute made at Westminster. Chapter Twelve. Of Pardon on Outlawries. Satisfaction of Plaintiff's Damages. On Outlawry before Appearance, Party outlawed shall yield himself. Plaintiff shall be named to appear and proceed.	The whole act.
5 Edw. 3. c. 13	Outlawry	Statute made at Westminster. Chapter Thirteen. Averment of Plaintiffs (or for the King) shall be received against Imprisonment alleged to defeat Outlawry.	The whole act.
9 Edw. 3. Stat. 1. c. 3	Process against executors	Roll of the Statute made at York, Statute the First. Chapter Three. Executors shall not fourch by Essoin. Process against Executors. Judgment against all where some only plead.	The whole act.
14 Edw. 3. Stat. 1. c. 14	Petition for lands in King's hand	Statute the First. Chapter Fourteen. After four Writs of Search for the King returned, the King put to answer; on Petition for Lands in his hands. The Great or Privy Seal shall not hinder this Statute.	The whole act.
20 Edw. 3. Ordinance for the Justices c. 1	Civil Procedure Act 1346	Ordinance for the Justices. Chapter One. Justices shall do right to all Persons without regard of Letters.	The whole act.
20 Edw. 3. Ordinance for the Justices c. 2	Exchequer Court	Ordinance for the Justices. Chapter Two. The Barons of the Exchequer shall do right without Delay.	The whole act.
27 Edw. 3. Stat. 1. A Statute against Anullers of Judgments of the King's Court c. 1	Suing in foreign court	A Statute against Annullers of Judgments of the King's Court: made in the Twenty-seventh Year. Chapter One. All subjects suing in a Foreign Court for matters made cognizable in the King's Court, or questioning elsewhere the judgments of the King's Court, shall have Two Months Warning to answer for such Contempt. On Non-appearance they shall be outlawed, forfeit their Lands and Goods, and be imprisoned. Offenders coming in before Outlawry shall be received.	The whole act.
34 Edw. 3. c. 13	Escheators	A Statute made in the Parliament holden at Westminster. Chapter Thirteen. Escheators shall take Inquests by Good People; by Indenture and not privily.	The whole act.
34 Edw. 3. c. 14	Escheators	A Statute made in the Parliament holden at Westminster. Chapter Fourteen. Offices found before Escheators may be traversed in Chancery, and tried in the King's Bench.	The whole act.
37 Edw. 3. Statut' de Victu et Vestitu c. 2	Idemptiate Nominis	A Statute concerning Diet and Apparel. Chapter Two. A Writ of Idemptitate Nominis in Outlawry. The Party shall be admitted to find Surety thereupon.	The whole act.
1 Ric. 2. c. 12	Prisoners for Debt Act 1377	Roll of the Statutes of the First Year of King Richard II. Chapter Twelve. Warden of the Fleet shall not let at large Prisoners in Execution. Punishment by Loss of Office. Action of Debt at the Suit of the Plaintiff. Penalty for confessing a Debt to the King, to the delay of another's Execution.	The whole act.
6 Ric. 2. c. 2	Venue Act 1382	Statute made at Westminster in the Sixth Year. Chapter Two. Actions of Debt and Account shall be brought in their proper Counties.	The whole act.
7 Ric. 2. c. 14	Attorneys in writs of premunire	Statute made at Westminster in the Seventh Year. Chapter Fourteen. For enabling Parties out of the Realm to appoint Attorneys in Writs of Premunire.	The whole act.
8 Ric. 2. c. 5	Jurisdiction of constable and marshal	Statute made at Westminster in the Eighth Year. Chapter Five. Pleas at Common Law shall not be discussed before the Constable and Marshal.	The whole act.
13 Ric. 2. stat. 1. c. 2	Jurisdiction of Constable and Marshal Act 1389	Statute of the Thirteenth Year. Statute the First. Chapter Two. Jurisdiction of the Constable and Marshal. Of whose Contracts the Constable hath cognizance. Declarations thereof. Prohibition of Constable and Marshal.	The whole act.
13 Ric. 2. stat. 1. c. 5	Jurisdiction of admiral and deputy	Statute of the Thirteenth Year. Statute the First. Chapter Five. Jurisdiction of the Admiral and his Deputy.	The whole act.
15 Ric. 2. c. 3	Admiralty Jurisdiction Act 1391	Of the Statute of the Fifteenth Year. Chapter Three. Jurisdiction of the Admiral.	From the beginning of the Chapter to "his Lieutenant in anywise."
17 Ric. 2. c. 6	Untrue suggestions in Chancery	Statutes of the Seventeenth Year. Chapter Six. On untrue Suggestions before the council or in Chancery damages may be awarded.	The whole act.
2 Hen. 4. c. 7	No nonsuit after verdict	Statute of the Second Year. Chapter Seven. In Assizes of Mort d'Ancestor, &c. Plaintiffs shall not be Nonsuit after Verdict.	The whole act.
4 Hen. 4. c. 23	Judgments Act 1402	Statutes of the Fourth Year. Chapter Twenty-three. Judgments shall remain in Force until reversed by Attaint or Error.	The whole act.
7 Hen. 4. c. 13	Attorneys in Outlawry	Statute of the Seventh Year. Chapter Thirteen. Impotent Persons outlawed may make Attorneys, except on Writs of Execution.	The whole act.
2 Hen. 5. stat. 1. c. 2	Certiorari	Statute the First. Chapter Two. The Injustice arising from Writs of Certiorari Corpus cum Causa out of Chancery for removal of Prisoners in Execution. Upon the Judgments returned against such Prisoners they shall be remanded.	The whole act.
8 Hen. 6. c. 9	Forcible Entry Act 1429	Statutes of the Eighth Year of King Henry 6. Chapter Nine. Recital of the Statute 15 Ric. 2. c. 2. against Forcible Entries; Defects of that Statute; recited Statute and others confirmed, and extended to Forcible Detainers. The Party ousted shall be restored to Possession, whether it be vacant or full. Feoffments, &c. after such Entry for Maintenance declared void. Precept to the Sheriff to return a Jury to inquire of Forcible Entries. Jurors to have Forty Shillings per annum. Penalty for the Sheriff on neglect of Duty. Proceedings against the Sheriffs, &c. for Defaults. Assise of Novel Disseisin or Action of Trespass may be laid against him who doth put out or keep out of Possession with Force. Chief Officers in Cities, &c. may execute this Act. Proviso in case of Possession for Three Years.	Except as to Criminal Proceedings.
9 Hen. 6. c. 4	Indemptitate nominis by Executors	Of the Ninth Year. Chapter Four. A Writ of Idemptitate Nominis maintainable by Executors in Cases of Outlawry of their Testator before or since the Statute 1 Hen. 5. c. 5.	The whole act.
3 Hen. 7. c. 10	Costs in Error Act 1487	An Acte against Delays of Execucion upon Writs of Error and to give Costs.	The whole act.
19 Hen. 7. c. 20	Costs in Error Act 1503	De brevibus erroris repremendis.	The whole act.
6 Hen. 8. c. 4	Proclamation Before Exigent, etc. Act 1514	Acte for pclamacions to be made before the Exigent be awarded into foreyn Shires.	So far as it relates to Outlawry in Civil Cases.
24 Hen. 8. c. 8	Costs Act 1532	An Acte where Defendants shall not recover any Costs.	The whole act.
1 Edw. 6. c. 7	Justices of the Peace Act 1547	An Acte for the contynuance of Actions after the death of any King of this Realme.	Sections One and Three.
3 & 4 Edw. 6. c. 3	Improvement of Commons Act 1549	An Acte concerning the improvement of Comons and waste Groundes.	The whole act.
8 Eliz. c. 2	Defendant's Recovery of Costs Act 1566	An Acte whereby the Defendant may recover his Costes, being wrongfully vexed.	Section One; and the words "in the sayd Court of the Marshalsey, &c." in Section Two.
18 Eliz. c. 5	Common Informers Act 1575	An Acte to redresse Disorders in Comon Informers upon Penall Lawes.	Section Four, from "and that yf any suche Informer" to end of Section.
18 Eliz. c. 12	Nisi Prius (Middlesex) Act 1575	An Acte for the tryall of Nisi Prius in the Countye of Midd.	The whole act.
29 Eliz. c. 5	Continuance, etc. of Laws Act 1586	An Acte for the contynuance and pfectinge of diverse Statutes.	The whole act.
31 Eliz. c. 3	Avoidance of Secret Outlawries Act 1588	An Acte for the avoiding of Privy and Secret Outlawries of Her Majestie's Subjects.	The whole act.
31 Eliz. c. 5	Common Informers Act 1588	An Acte concerning Informers.	Sections Four and Six, and Sections Two and Three, except as to Criminal Proceedings.
31 Eliz. c. 10	Continuance, etc. of Laws Act 1588	An Acte for the contynuance and pfectinge of diverse Statutes.	The whole act.
43 Eliz. c. 6	Frivolous Suits Act 1601	An Acte to avoid trifling and frivolous Suites in Law in Her Majesties Courtes at Westm.	Section Two.
13 Chas. 2. Stat. 2. c. 2	Vexatious Arrests and Delays at Law Act 1661	An Act for prevention of Vexations and Oppressions by Arrests, and of Delaies in Suits of Law.	The whole act.
16 & 17 Chas. 2. c. 8	Arrest of Judgment Act 1664	An Act to prevent Arrests of Judgement and superseding Executions.	The whole act.
18 & 19 Chas. 2. c. 10	Replevins in Wales and Counties Palatine Act 1666	An Act extending a former Act concerning Replevins and Avowries to the Principality of Wales and the County Palatines.	The whole act.
29 Chas. 2. c. 3	Statute of Frauds	An Act for Prevention of Frauds and Perjuryes.	Sections Thirteen and Fourteen.
29 Chas. 2. c. 5	Affidavits Act 1677	An Act for taking of Affidavits in the Country to be made use of in the Courts of King's Bench, Common Pleas, and Exchequer.	The whole act.
4 Will. & Mar. c. 18	Malicious Information in Court of King's Bench Act 1692	An Act to prevent malicious Informations in the Court of King's Bench, and for the more easie reversal of Outlaries in the same Court.	Sections Two, Three and Four, except as to Outlawry in Criminal Cases.
4 Will. & Mar. c. 22	Crown Office Procedure Act 1692	An Act for regulateing Proceedings in the Crowne Office of the Court of King's Bench att Westminster.	Sections One, Two, and Three.
8 & 9 Will. 3. c. 11	Administration of Justice Act 1696	An Act for the better preventing frivolous and vexatious Suits.	Section Four.
10 Will. 3. c. 20	Reversal of Fines and Recoveries, etc. Act 1698	An Act for limiting certaine Times within which Writts of Error shall be brought for the reversing Fines, Common Recoveries, and Ancient Judgments.	The whole act.
11 Will. 3. c. 9	Frivolous Suits Act 1698	An Act for preventing frivolous and vexatious Suits in the Principality of Wales and the Counties Palatine.	The whole act.
4 & 5 Ann. c. 3	Administration of Justice Act 1705	An Act for the Amendment of the Law and better advancement of Justice.	Sections Twenty-two, Twenty-three, and Twenty-five.
8 Geo. 1. c. 25	Judgments, Wales and Counties Palatine Act 1721	An Act for supplying some Defects in the Statute of the Twenty-third of King Henry the Eighth, [intituled "An Act for Obligations to be taken by two Chief Justices, the Mayor of the Staple, and the Recorder of London,"] and for setting down the Time of signing Judgments in the Principality of Wales and Counties Palatine.	The whole act.
12 Geo. 1. c. 31	Nisi Prius (Middlesex) Act 1725	Act for the better regulating Tryals by Nisi Prius in the County of Middlesex.	The whole act.
3 Geo. 2. c. 30	Orders, etc., of the Master of the Rolls Act 1729	An Act to put an end to certain Disputes touching Orders and Decrees made in the Court of Chancery.	The whole act.
4 Geo. 2. c. 26	Proceedings in Courts of Justice Act 1730	An Act that all Proceedings in the Courts of Justice within that part of Great Britain called England, and in the Court of Exchequer in Scotland, shall be in the English Language.	The whole act.
6 Geo. 2. c. 14	Courts in Wales and Chester Act 1732	An Act for the more effectual preventing frivolous and vexatious Arrests,—and ends with the words,—and for explaining and amending the said Act.	The whole act.
14 Geo. 2. c. 17	Delay of Cause after Issue Joined Act 1740	An Act to prevent inconveniences arising from Delays of Causes after issue joined.	The whole act.
1 Geo. 3. c. 23	Commissions and Salaries of Judges Act 1760	An Act for rendering more effectual,—and ends with the words,—Commissions and Salaries of Judges.	The whole act.
10 Geo. 3. c. 50	Parliamentary Privilege Act 1770	An Act for the further preventing Delays of Justice by reason of Privilege of Parliament.	Sections Three and Four.
22 Geo. 3. c. 82	Civil List and Secret Service Money Act 1782	An Act for enabling,—and ends with the words,—Revenues of the Civil List.	Section Five.
38 Geo. 3. c. 52	Counties of Cities Act 1798	An Act to regulate the Trial of Causes, Indictments, and other Proceedings which arise within the Counties of certain Cities and Towns corporate within this Kingdom.	Section One, as to Actions.
38 Geo. 3. c. 87	Administration of Estates Act 1798	An Act for the Administration of Assets in cases where the Executor to whom Probate has been granted is out of the Realm.	Section Four.
43 Geo. 3. c. 46	Costs Act 1803	An Act for the more effectual Prevention of Frivolous and vexatious Arrests and Suits, and to authorise the levying of Poundage upon Executions in certain cases.	Sections Two and Six.
49 Geo. 3. c. 91	Justice of Assize Act 1809	An Act to empower the Judges to try Civil Causes in their own Counties in England.	The whole act.
53 Geo. 3. c. 24	Administration of Justice Act 1813	An Act to facilitate the Administration of Justice.	The whole act.
1 Geo. 4. c. 21	Nisi Prius Act 1820	An Act to enable the Chief Justice of the King's Bench, or in his absence, any Judge of the same Court, to try Middlesex Issues at Nisi Prius elsewhere than in Westminster Hall.	The whole act.
1 Geo. 4. c. 55	Kings' Bench Justices of Assize Act 1820	An Act for giving further Facilities to the Proceedings in the Court of King's Bench, and for giving certain Powers to Justices of Assize.	The whole act.
6 Geo. 4. c. 95	Sergeants at Law Act 1825	An Act to enable such Persons as His Majesty may be pleased to call to the Degree of a Serjeant-at-Law to take upon themselves that Office in Vacation.	The whole act.
11 Geo. 4 & 1 Will. 4. c. 36	Contempt of Court Act 1830	An Act for altering and amending the Law regarding Commitments by Courts of Equity for Contempts, and the taking Bills pro confesso.	Sections Three to Fourteen, the Sub-sections numbered One to Six and Nine to Fourteen of Section Fifteen, Section Sixteen, and Section Seventeen, from "except as to Costs" to "Money or Costs."
11 Geo. 4 & 1 Will. 4. c. 58	Common Law Courts (England) Act 1830	An Act for regulating the receipt and future Appropriation of Fees and Emoluments receivable by Officers of the Superior Courts of Common Law.	The whole act.
11 Geo. 4 & 1 Will. 4. c. 70	Law Terms Act 1830	An Act for the more effectual Administration of Justice in England and Wales.	Sections One and Four, Section Six, from "provided" to end of Section, and Sections Seven and Eight, except as to Criminal Proceedings, and Sections Eleven, Thirteen, Nineteen, Twenty, and Twenty-seven.
1 Will. 4. c. 3	Law Terms (Explanation) Act 1830	An Act to amend an Act of the last Session, for the better Administration of Justice, so far as relates to the Essoyn and General Return Days of each Term, and to substitute other Provisions in lieu thereof; and to declare the Law with regard to the Duration of the Terms in certain Cases.	Section Two.
1 Will. 4. c. 7	Execution of Judgments Act 1831	An Act for the more speedy Judgment and Execution,—and ends with the words,—in Cases of Bankruptcy.	Sections Two and Three.
1 Will. 4. c. 22	Evidence on Commission Act 1831	An Act to enable Courts of Law to order the examination of Witnesses upon Interrogatories and otherwise.	Sections Three, Nine, and Eleven.
1 & 2 Will. 4. c. 58	Interpleader (England) Act 1831	An Act to enable Courts of Law to give Relief against adverse Claims made upon Persons having no Interest in the Subject of such Claims.	Section One, from "or in the Court of Common Pleas" to "before Plea"; and Sections Two and Four.
2 & 3 Will. 4. c. 39	Process in Courts of Law at Westminster Act 1832	An Act for Uniformity of Process in Personal Actions in His Majesty's Courts of Law at Westminster.	The whole act.
2 & 3 Will. 4. c. 58	Contempt of Court Act 1832	An Act to extend the Provisions of an Act of the First Year of the Reign of His present Majesty for altering and amending the Law regarding Commitments by Courts of Equity for Contempts, and the taking Bills pro Confesso, and to explain certain Parts thereof.	From "except as to the Costs" to "Nonpayment of Money or Costs."
3 & 4 Will. 4. c. 27	Real Property Limitation Act 1833	An Act for the Limitation of Actions and Suits relating to Real Property, and for simplifying the Remedies for trying the Rights thereto.	Section Thirty-six.
3 & 4 Will. 4. c. 42	Civil Procedure Act 1833	An Act for the Amendment of the Law and the better Advancement of Justice.	Sections Thirteen, Fourteen, Twenty-two, Thirty, and Forty-three.
3 & 4 Will. 4. c. 67	Writs of Execution Act 1833	An Act to amend an Act of the Second Year of His present Majesty for the Uniformity of Process in Personal Actions in His Majesty's Courts of Law at Westminster.	The whole act.
3 & 4 Will. 4. c. 71	Assizes Act 1833	An Act for the Appointment of convenient Places for the Holding of Assizes in England and Wales.	Section Four.
3 & 4 Will. 4. c. 94	Chancery Regulation Act 1833	An Act for the Regulation of the Proceedings and Practice of certain Offices of the High Court of Chancery in England.	Sections Twenty-two, Twenty-three, Twenty-four, and Thirty.
4 & 5 Will. 4. c. 42	Stannaries Court of Cornwall Act 1834	An Act to facilitate the taking of Affidavits and Affirmations in the Court of the Vice-Warden of the Stannaries of Cornwall.	Section One, from "and that any Master" to "Vice-Warden."
4 & 5 Will. 4. c. 62	Court of Common Pleas of Lancaster Act 1834	An Act for improving the Practice and Proceedings in the Court of Common Pleas of the County Palatine of Lancaster.	The whole act.
5 & 6 Will. 4. c. 83	Tithes Prescription Act 1834	An Act to amend the Law touching Letters Patent for Inventions.	Sections Three, Five, and Six.
7 Will. 4 & 1 Vict. c. 30	Superior Courts (Officers) Act 1837	An Act to abolish certain Offices in the Superior Courts of Common Law, and to make Provision for a more effective and uniform Establishment of Officers in those Courts.	Sections One, Two, Five, and Seven; Section Twelve, from "and all such Clerks" to end of Section; and Sections Eighteen, Twenty-four, Twenty-six, and Twenty-seven, and Schedule A.
1 & 2 Vict. c. 45	Common Law Procedure Act 1838	An Act to extend the Jurisdiction of the Judges of the Superior Courts of Common Law; to amend Chapter Fifty-six of the First Year of Her present Majesty's Reign, for regulating the Admission of Attorneys, and to provide for the taking of Special Bail in the absence of the Judges.	Sections One and Two.
1 & 2 Vict. c. 110	Judgments Act 1838	An Act for abolishing Arrest on Mesne Process except in certain Cases; for extending the Remedies of Creditors against the Property of Debtors, and for amending the Laws for the Relief of Insolvent Debtors in England.	In Section Seventeen the words "or from the commencement of this Act in Cases of Judgments then entered up and not carrying Interest," Section Twenty; Section Twenty-one, from "and all Powers" to "same Courts respectively," and from "and provided also" to end of Section; and in Section Twenty-two the words "of, or of such Superior Court be within the County Palatine of Lancaster for the Judges of the Court of Common Pleas at Lancaster," and the words "or into the Court of Common Pleas at Lancaster, as the case may be," in each place where they occur.
2 & 3 Vict. c. 11	Judgments Act 1839	An Act for the better Protection of Purchasers against Judgements, Crown Debts, Lis pendens, and Fiats in Bankruptcy.	Section Two.
2 & 3 Vict. c. 16	Court of Pleas of Durham Act 1839	An Act for improving the Practice and Proceedings in the Court of Pleas of the County Palatine of Durham and Sadberge.	The whole act.
3 & 4 Vict. c. 24	Costs of Action of Trespass Act 1840	An Act to repeal Part of an Act of the Forty-third Year of Queen Elizabeth,—and ends with the words,—Provisions in Lieu thereof.	The whole act.
3 & 4 Vict. c. 65	Admiralty Court Act 1840	An Act to improve the Practice and extend the Jurisdiction of the High Court of Admiralty in England.	Sections Two, Eleven to Seventeen, and Nineteen.
3 & 4 Vict. c. 66	High Court of Admiralty (England) Act 1840	An Act to make Provision for the Judge Registrar and Marshal of the High Court of Admiralty of England.	Sections One, Three, Seven, Seventeen, and Eighteen.
5 Vict. c. 5	Court of Chancery Act 1841	An Act to make further Provisions for the Administration of Justice.	Section One, Sections Nineteen to Thirty-seven, Section Forty-nine, and the Second and Third Schedules.
5 & 6 Vict. c. 86	Exchequer Court Act 1842	An Act for abolishing certain Offices on the Revenue Side of the Court of Exchequer in England, and for regulating the Office of Her Majesty's Remembrancer in that Court.	Sections Two, Four, Seven, and Ten.
5 & 6 Vict. c. 103	Court of Chancery Act 1842	An Act for abolishing certain Offices of the High Court of Chancery in England.	Sections Fourteen, Eighteen, Thirty-one, Thirty-two, and Thirty-seven.
6 & 7 Vict. c. 20	Court of Queen's Bench Act 1843	An Act for abolishing certain Offices on the Crown Side of the Court of Queen's Bench, and for regulating the Crown Office.	Section Two, from the words "and such Clerks" to the end of the Section, and Sections Fourteen and Fifteen.
6 & 7 Vict. c. 38	Judicial Committee Act 1843	An Act to make further Regulations for facilitating the hearing Appeals and other Matters by the Judicial Committee of the Privy Council.	Section Thirteen.
6 & 7 Vict. c. 67	Writs of Mandamus Act 1843	An Act to enable Parties to sue out and prosecute Writs of Error in certain cases upon the Proceedings on Writs of Mandamus.	Section Four.
12 & 13 Vict. c. 109	Petty Bag Act 1849	The Petty Bag Office and Enrolment in Chancery Amendment Act, 1849.	Section Twenty-six, Section Thirty, from "and shall also" to "this Act," and Sections Thirty-nine, Forty-one, Forty-six, Forty-seven, and Forty-nine.
13 & 14 Vict. c. 35	Court of Chancery (England) Act 1850	An Act to diminish the Delay and Expense of Proceedings in the High Court of Chancery in England.	Sections Twenty-seven to Thirty-three.
13 & 14 Vict. c. 75	Court of Common Pleas Act 1850	An Act to regulate the Receipt and Amount of Fees receivable by certain Officers in the Court of Common Pleas.	The whole act.
14 & 15 Vict. c. 83	Court of Chancery Act 1851	An Act to improve the Administration of Justice in the Court of Chancery and in the Judicial Committee of the Privy Council.	Sections Two, Three, Twelve, and Twenty.
15 & 16 Vict. c. 73	Common Law Courts Act 1852	An Act to make Provision for a Permanent Establishment of Officers to perform the Duties at Nisi Prius in the Superior Courts of Common Law, and for the Payment of such Officers and the Judges' Clerks by Salaries, and to abolish certain Offices in those Courts.	Section Three; Section Four from "and all such" to "belong;" Sections Ten, Thirteen, and Nineteen; Section Twenty-one from "and such Salaries and Expenses" to "Great Britain and Ireland;" and Sections Twenty-two, Twenty-three, Twenty-four, Twenty-seven, Twenty-eight, and Thirty-one.

Enactments repealed as to the Supreme Court of Judicature in England
Citation	Short Title	Title	Extent of repeal
6 Edw. 1. Statuta Gloucestr' c. 1	Franchise Act 1278	The Statutes of Gloucester. Chapter One. Damages in Novel Disseisin. In Mort d'Auncestor, Cosinage, &c. Where Damages shall be recovered, there Costs also. Damages generally.	From "and whereas before Time" to "recover Damages."
13 Edw. 1. c. 15	Infants (Next Friend) Act 1285	The Statutes of Westminster, the Second. Chapter Fifteen. Infants eloined may sue by prochein amy.	The whole act.
14 Edw. 3. Stat. 1. c. 6	Amendment of records	Statute the First. Records defective by misprision of Clerks amendable.	Except as to Criminal Proceedings.
1 Hen. 5. c. 5	Statute of Additions (details on original writs and indictments)	Statutes of the First Year of King Henry V. Chapter Five. In original Writs, &c. Additions of Defendants' Degrees, &c. shall be put.	Except as to Criminal Proceedings.
9 Hen. 5. Stat. 1. c. 4	Amendment	Statute the First. Chapter Four. Recital of the Statute 14 Edw. 3. stat. 1. c. 6. Justices may amend the Defaults in Records and Process after Judgment.	Except as to Criminal Proceedings.
4 Hen. 6. c. 3	Amendment	Statutes of the Fourth Year of King Henry VI. Chapter Three. Recital of the Statute 9 Hen. 5. st. 1., reciting Statute 14 Edw. 3. st. 1. c. 6. for amendment of Errors in process by misprision of Clerks as well after Judgment as before. The said Statutes confirmed as well after Judgment on Verdict as on Demurrer. Exception as to Wales and Records of Outlawry.	Except as to Criminal Proceedings.
8 Hen. 6. c. 12	Amendment Act 1429	Statutes of the Eighth Year of King Henry VI. Chapter Twelve. No Judgment nor Record shall be reversed or avoided for Erasures, Interlineations, or literal Errors. The Judges may reform all Defects in Records by misprision of the Clerk, in affirmance of Judgement, except in Appeals, Indictments, Outlawries, want of Additions, &c. Variance alleged between a Record and Certificate thereof shall be amended in affirmance of Judgement. Embezzeling of a Record whereby any Judgement is reversed declared to be Felony. Record, &c. exemplified under the Great Seal and inrolled in Chancery shall not be reversed for variance from the Exemplification and Inrollment.	Except as to Criminal Proceedings.
8 Hen. 6. c. 15	Amendment (No. 2) Act 1429	Statutes of the Eighth Year of King Henry VI. Chapter Fifteen. The Judges may amend Records in cases of misprision of Sheriffs, &c. Exceptions as to Processes in Wales and Outlawries in Felonies and Treasons.	Except as to Criminal Proceedings.
21 Hen. 8. c. 19	Avowries Act 1529	An Acte concerninge Avowries.	The whole act.
23 Hen. 8. c. 15	Costs Act 1531	An Acte that the Defendaunt shall recover Costs ageinste the Playntif if the Playntif be non-suited, or if the v'dicte passe ageinste him.	The whole act.
32 Hen. 8. c. 30	Mispleadings, Jeofails, etc. Act 1540	Mispleading Jeofailes, &c.	The whole act.
18 Eliz. c. 14	Jeofails Act 1575	An Acte for Reformacion of Jeofayles.	The whole act.
27 Eliz. c. 5	Demurrers and Pleadings Act 1584	An Acte for the expedition of Justice in causes of Demurrers and Pleadings.	The whole act.
4 Jas. 1. c. 3	Costs Act 1606	An Act to give Costs to the Defendant uppon a Nonsuit of the Plaintiffe or uppon a Verdicte against him.	The whole act.
21 Jas. 1. c. 13	Jeofails Act 1623	An Acte for the further Reformacon of Jeofayles.	The whole act.
21 Jas. 1. c. 16	Limitation Act 1623	An Acte for Lymytacon of Accons, and for avoyding of Suits in Law.	Section Six.
17 Chas. 2. c. 8	Death between Verdict and Judgment Act 1665	An Acte for avoiding unnecessary Suites and Delayes.	The whole act.
8 & 9 Will. 3. c. 11	Administration of Justice Act 1696	An Act for the better preventing frivolous and vexatious Suits.	Sections One, Two, Three, Five, Six, and Seven.
4 & 5 Anne. c. 3	Administration of Justice Act 1705	An Act for the Amendment of the Law and better Advancement of Justice.	Sections One, Two, Four, Five, Seven, and Eleven.
5 Geo. 1. c. 13	Writs of Error Act 1718	An Act for the Amendment of Writs of Error, and for the further preventing the arresting or reversing of Judgments after Verdict.	The whole act.
2 Geo. 2. c. 22	Insolvent Debtors Relief (No. 2) Act 1728	An Act for the Relief of Debtors with respect to the Imprisonment of their Persons.	The whole act.
8 Geo. 2. c. 24	Set-off Act 1734	An Act to explain and amend an Act passed in the Second Year of the Reign of His present Majesty, intituled "An Act for the Relief of Debtors with respect to the Imprisonment of their Persons."	The whole act.
11 Geo. 2. c. 19	Distress for Rent Act 1737	An Act for the more effectual securing the Payment of Rent, and preventing Frauds by Tenants.	Section Twenty-two.
19 Geo. 2. c. 37	Marine Insurance Act 1745	An Act to regulate Insurance on Ships belonging to the Subjects of Great Britain and on Merchandises or Effects laden thereon.	Section Seven.
43 Geo. 3. c. 46	Costs Act 1803	An Act for the more effectual Prevention of frivolous and vexatious Arrests and Suits; and to authorise the levying of Poundage upon Executions in certain Cases.	The whole act.
9 Geo. 4. c. 14	Statute of Frauds Amendment Act 1828	An Act for rendering a Written Memorandum necessary to the Validity of certain Promises and Engagements.	Section Two.
9 Geo. 4. c. 15	Amendment of Record in Civil Actions Act 1828	An Act to prevent a Failure of Justice by reason of variances between Records and Writings produced in Evidence in support thereof.	Except as to Criminal Proceedings.
11 Geo. 4 & 1 Will. 4. c. 47	Debts Recovery Act 1830	An Act for consolidating and amending the Laws for facilitating the Payment of Debts out of Real Estate.	Section Ten.
2 & 3 Will. 4. c. 100	Tithe Act 1832	An Act for shortening the Time required in Claims of Modus decimandi or Exemption from or Discharge of Tithes.	Section Seven.
3 & 4 Will. 4. c. 42	Civil Procedure Act 1833	An Act for the Amendment of the Law and the better Advancement of Justice.	Sections Eight, Nine, Eleven, and Thirty-one to Thirty-five.
4 & 5 Will. 4. c. 39	Costs in Actions of Quare Impedit Act 1834	An Act to give Costs in Actions in Quare impedit.	The whole act.
4 & 5 Will. 4. c. 82	Service of Process out of the Jurisdiction England and Ireland Act 1834	An Act to amend and extend an Act of the Second Year of His present Majesty, to effectuate the Service of Process issuing from the Courts of Chancery and Exchequer in England and Ireland.	The whole act.
6 & 7 Vict. c. 96	Libel Act 1843	An Act to amend the Law respecting Defamatory Words and Libel.	Section Two, from "and that every such Defendant," to "Advancement of Justice."
8 & 9 Vict. c. 75	Libel Act 1845	An Act to amend an Act passed in the Session of Parliament held in the Sixth and Seventh Years of the Reign of Her present Majesty, intituled "An Act to amend the Law respecting Defamatory Words and Libel."	The words "is provided by said Act," in Section Two.
8 & 9 Vict. c. 109	Gaming Act 1845	An Act to amend the Law concerning Games and Wager.	Section Nineteen.

== See also ==
- Statute Law Revision Act
