= Statute of Frauds Amendment Act 1828 =

Act of the Parliament of the United Kingdom

Statute of Frauds Amendment Act 1828 (Note: The citation of this act by this short title was authorised by section 1 of, and the first schedule to, the Short Titles Act 1896. Due to the repeal of those provisions it is now authorised by section 19(2) of the Interpretation Act 1978.)
- Act of Parliament
- Parliament of the United Kingdom
- Long title: An Act for rendering a written Memorandum necessary to the Validity of certain Promises and Engagements.
- Citation: 9 Geo. 4. c. 14
- Territorial extent: England and Wales; Ireland; (Note: Section 9.)

Dates
- Royal assent: 9 May 1828
- Commencement: 1 January 1829 (Note: Section 10.)
Other legislation
Amended by	Statute Law Revision Act 1873; Statute Law Revision Act 1875; Civil Procedure Acts Repeal Act 1879; Statute Law Revision and Civil Procedure Act 1883; Statute Law Revision Act 1890; Sale of Goods Act 1893; Limitation Act 1939

Status: Partially repealed

Text of statute as originally enacted

Revised text of statute as amended

Text of the Statute of Frauds Amendment Act 1828 as in force today (including any amendments) within the United Kingdom, from legislation.gov.uk.

The Statute of Frauds Amendment Act 1828 (9 Geo. 4. c. 14), commonly known as Lord Tenterden's Act, is an act of the Parliament of the United Kingdom. Lord Tenterden served as Lord Chief Justice of the King's Bench between 1818 and 1832. Its purpose was for "rendering a written Memorandum necessary to the Validity of certain Promises and Engagements".

== History ==
The act received royal assent on 9 May 1828. The act was adopted in New South Wales by the act 4 Will 4 No 17 (NSW) (1834), and extended to the territories of the East India Company by Act No XIV of 1840 (India).

== Provisions ==
=== Preamble ===
The preamble said that by Limitation Act 1623 (21 Jas. 1. c. 16) and a similar act passed in Ireland, namely the Trespass Act 1634 (10 Chas. 1 Sess. 2. c. 6 (I)), various questions have arisen in actions founded on simple contract, as to the proof and effect of acknowledgments and promises offered in evidence for the purpose of taking cases out of the operation of these acts; and it is expedient to prevent such questions, and to make provision for giving effect to the said acts and to the intention thereof.

=== Section 1 ===
Section 1 provided that in actions of debt or upon the case grounded upon any simple contract no oral acknowledgment or promise shall be deemed sufficient evidence of a new or continuing contract, whereby to take any case out of the operation of the above acts, or to deprive any party of the benefit thereof, unless such acknowledgment or promise shall be in some writing signed by the party chargeable thereby; and that where there shall be two or more joint contractors, no such joint contractor shall lose the benefit of the above acts, so as to be chargeable in respect or by reason only of any written acknowledgment or promise made and signed by any other of them, and that nothing in this section shall alter or take away or lessen the effect of any payment of any principal or interest made by any person, and that in actions to be commenced against two or more such joint contractors, if it shall appear that the plaintiff, though barred by either of the above acts or this act, as to one or more of such joint contractors, shall nevertheless be entitled to recover against any other or others of the defendants, by virtue of a new acknowledgment or promise, judgment may be given the plaintiff as to such defendants against whom he shall recover, and for the other defendants against the plaintiff.

=== Section 2 ===
Section 2 provided that if any defendant in any action on any simple contract shall make a plea in abatement, to the effect that any other person ought to be jointly sued, and it shall appear that the action could not, by reason of the said above acts or this act be maintained against the other person named in such plea, the issue joined on such plea shall be found against the party pleading.

=== Section 3 ===
That no indorsement or memorandum of any payment written or made upon any promissory note, bill of exchange, or other writing, by the party to whom such payment shall be made, shall be deemed sufficient proof of such payment, so as to take the case out of the operation the above acts.

=== Section 4 ===
Section 4 of the act provided that the above acts and this act shall apply in case of debt or simple contract asserted as a defence of set-off.

=== Section 5 ===
Section 5 of the act provided that no action shall be maintained upon any promise made after full age to pay any debt contracted during infancy, or upon any ratification after full age of any contract made during infancy, unless made by writing signed by the party to be charged.

=== Section 6 ===
Section 6 of the act was enacted to prevent section 4 of the Statute of Frauds being circumvented by bringing an action for the tort of deceit (the tort in Freeman v Palsey), by requiring the representation of credit be in writing signed by the party charged.

In the 2007 Court of Appeal case of Contex Drouzhba Ltd v Wiseman, the question was considered of whether the signature of a company director, fraudulently placed on a document on behalf of the company, was also the personal signature of the director, so as to be "the signature by the party to be charged" in accordance with the wording of this section, signed by the party to be charged therewith. Mr Wiseman, the defendant, argued that his signing the document constituted "writing" on behalf of the company but in regard to his personal liability it was "conduct", insufficient to be treated as "writing, signed by the party to be charged". The judges dismissed Mr Wiseman's appeal, finding that "Mr Wiseman made a fraudulent representation in writing as to the credit or ability" of the company.

In another Court of Appeal case, Roder UK Ltd v West (2011), it was held that an oral representation explaining (incorrectly) how an existing debt would be repaid did not reflect "an intent or purpose ... [to] obtain credit, money or goods", since credit had already been granted and the goods involved had already been supplied. The honesty of the representation on how the debt could be cleared therefore fell outside the scope of section 6.

=== Section 7 ===
This section provided that the Statute of Frauds relating to contract for the sale of goods for the price of ten pounds sterling or more shall cover goods to be delivered in the future, not yet manufactured, or not yet fit for delivery. It is also applicable to the Statute of Frauds 1695 (29 Cha. 2. c. 3) in Ireland.

=== Section 8 ===
Section 8 of the act provided that writings required by this act were not agreement subject to stamp duty.

=== Section 9 ===
Section 9 of the act provided that the act shall not extend to Scotland.

=== Section 10 ===
Section 10 of the act provided that the act would commence and take effect on 1 January 1829.

== Subsequent developments ==
Sections 1–4 of the act, so far as they related to personal actions or actions of ejectment in the Superior Courts of Law in Ireland, were repealed by section 3 of, and schedule A to, the Common Law Procedure Amendment Act (Ireland) 1853 (16 & 17 Vict. c. 113), subject to the exceptions in section 3 of that act.

Section 10 of the act was repealed by section 1 of, and the schedule to, the Statute Law Revision Act 1873 (36 & 37 Vict. c. 91), which came into force on 5 August 1873.

Section 2 of the act was repealed as to the Supreme Court of Judicature in England section 2 of, and part II of the schedule to, the Civil Procedure Acts Repeal Act 1879 (42 & 43 Vict. c. 59), which came into force on 15 August 1879.

Section 2 of the act was repealed for England and Wales by was repealed by section 4 of the Statute Law Revision and Civil Procedure Act 1883 (46 & 47 Vict. c. 49), which came into force on 24 October 1883.

Section 2 of, and the preamble to, the act were repealed by section 1 of, and the first schedule to, the Statute Law Revision Act 1890 (53 & 54 Vict. c. 33), which came into force on 4 August 1890.

Section 7 of the act was repealed by section 60 of, and the schedule to, the Sale of Goods Act 1893 (56 & 57 Vict. c. 71), which came into force on 1 January 1894.

Section 5 of the act was repealed by section 1 of, and the schedule to, the Statute Law Revision Act 1875 (38 & 39 Vict. c. 66), which came into force on 11 August 1875., because it was virtually repealed or superseded by section 2 of the Infants Relief Act 1874 (37 & 38 Vict. c. 62).

Sections 1, 3, 4 and 8 of the act were repealed by section 34(2) of, and the schedule to, the Limitation Act 1939 (2 & 3 Geo. 6. c. 21), which came into force on 1 January 1940.

== See also ==
- Statute of frauds
- Limitation Act 1623
- Statute of Frauds
