= Limitation Act =

Stock short title for legislation in Malaysia and UK

Limitation Act is a stock short title used for legislation in Malaysia and the United Kingdom which relates to limitation of actions.

The Bill for an Act with this short title may have been known as a Limitation Bill during its passage through Parliament.

Limitation Acts may be a generic name which refers to all statutes with this short title or which relate to limitation of actions.

== List ==
=== Australia ===
- The Limitation Act 1985 (ACT)
- The Limitation Act 1969 (NSW)
- The Limitation Act 1981 (NT)
- The Limitation Act 1974 (Qld)
- The Limitation Act 1936 (SA)
- The Limitation Act 1974 (TAS)
- The Limitation Act 1958 (Vic)
- The Limitation Act 1935 (WA)

=== Malaysia ===
- The Limitation Act 1953

=== New Zealand ===
- The Limitation Act 1950
- The Limitation Act 2010

=== United Kingdom ===
- The Limitation (Enemies and War Prisoners) Act 1945 (8 & 9 Geo. 6. c. 16)
- The Limitation Act 1623 (21 Jas. 1. c. 16)
- The Limitation Act 1939 (2 & 3 Geo. 6. c. 21)
- The Law Reform (Limitation of Acts, etc.) Act 1954 (2 & 3 Eliz. 2. c. 36)
- The Limitation Act 1963 (c. 47)
- The Limitation Act 1975 (c. 54)

==== England and Wales ====
- The Limitation Amendment Act 1980 (c. 24)
- The Limitation Act 1980 (c. 58) (one repeal, with saving, extends to Northern Ireland)
- The Foreign Limitation Periods Act 1984 (c. 16)

==== Scotland ====
- The Prescription and Limitation (Scotland) Act 1973 (c. 52)
- The Prescription and Limitation (Scotland) Act 1984 (c. 45)

==== Northern Ireland ====
Limitation Order

A number of Orders in Council with this title, and variations of it, have been passed. The change in nomenclature is due to the demise of the Parliament of Northern Ireland and the imposition of direct rule. These orders are considered to be primary legislation.

- The Limitation Amendment (Northern Ireland) Order 1982 (SI 1982/339 (N.I. 7))
- The Foreign Limitation Periods (Northern Ireland) Order 1985 (SI 1985/754 (N.I. 5))
- The Limitation (Amendment) (Northern Ireland) Order 1987 (SI 1987/1629 (N.I. 17))
- The Limitation (Northern Ireland) Order 1989 (SI 1989/1339 (N.I. 11))

== See also ==
- List of short titles
