= Penal damages =

Penal damages are liquidated damages which exceed reasonable compensatory damages, making them invalid under common law. While liquidated damage clauses set a pre-agreed value on the expected loss to one party if the other party were to breach the contract, penal damages go further and seek to penalise the breaching party beyond the reasonable losses from the breach. Many clauses which are found to be penal (i.e. "penalty clauses") are expressed as liquidated damages clauses but have been seen by courts as excessive and thus invalid.

The judicial approach to penal damages is conceptually important as it is one of the few examples of judicial paternalism in contract law. Even if two parties genuinely and without coercion wish to consent to a contract which includes a penal clause, they are unable to. In the United States, a 1947 legal case relating to the contracted supply of dried eggs to the Federal Surplus Commodities Corporation to be supplied as aid to Russia in 1942 (Priebe & Sons, Inc. v. United States) held that a provision in the contract for liquidated damages to be paid for late inspection and certification of the product constituted an unenforceable penalty clause.

A wholesale review of the English law rule against penalty clauses (as opposed to penal damages) was conducted by the UK Supreme Court in the 2015 judgment in Cavendish Square Holding BV v Talal El Makdessi.

== As distinguished from other types of damages ==
Penal damages are to be distinguished from punitive damages, which are awarded in certain types of tort actions for actions which caused harm to the plaintiff. Penal damages are also different from treble damages, which are generally set by statute for certain violations of competition law and related laws.

== See also ==
- Penalties in English law
