= Simple contract =

Contract not made under seal

In contract law, a simple contract, also known as an informal contract, is a contract made orally, in writing, or both, rather than a contract made under seal. Simple contracts require consideration to be valid, but simple contracts may be implied from the conduct of parties bound by the contract.

In his Commentaries on the Laws of England William Blackstone observed that in the seventeenth century, debtors used simple contracts as one of three accepted forms of unsecured debt instruments. In 1828, the Parliament of the United Kingdom amended the statute of frauds so that oral acknowledgments or promises could not be used as evidence to prove the existence of a simple contract. Today, some American jurisdictions have established that a security interest is perfected "when a creditor on a simple contract cannot acquire a judicial lien that is superior to the interest" of the secured party.

== See also ==
- New England Mutual Life Insurance Co. v. Woodworth
- Company seal
