= Administration of Justice Act 1696 =

Act of the Parliament of England

Administration of Justice Act 1696 (Note: The citation of this act by this short title was authorised by section 5 of, and the second schedule to, the Statute Law Revision Act 1948. Due to the repeal of those provisions, it is now authorised by section 19(2) of the Interpretation Act 1978.)
- Act of Parliament
- Parliament of England
- Long title: An Act for the better preventing of frivolous and vexatious Suits. (Note: These words are printed against this act in the second column of the second schedule to the Statute Law Revision Act 1948, which is headed "Title".)
- Citation: 8 & 9 Will. 3. c. 11
- Territorial extent: England and Wales

Dates
- Royal assent: 8 March 1697
- Commencement: 25 March 1697 (Note: Start of session.)
- Repealed: 30 July 1948
Other legislation
Repealed by	Civil Procedure Acts Repeal Act 1879; Statute Law Revision and Civil Procedure Act 1883; Statute Law Revision Act 1948

Status: Repealed

Text of statute as originally enacted

The Administration of Justice Act 1696 (8 & 9 Will. 3. c. 11) was an act of the Parliament of England.

== Cases ==
The act was referred to by the Lord Chancellor in the House of Lords decision on Clydebank Engineering and Shipbuilding Co. Ltd. v. Don Jose Ramos Yzquierdo y Castaneda (1904) as the law "upon which English lawyers rely" for making the distinction between damages and penalties.

== Subsequent developments ==
Sections 1–3 and 5–7 of the act were repealed by section 2 of, and part II of the schedule to, the Civil Procedure Acts Repeal Act 1879 (42 & 43 Vict. c. 59), which came into force on 15 August 1879. Section 4(2) of that act provided that the repeal did not operate in respect of any court other than the Supreme Court of Judicature in England.

Section 4 was repealed by section 2 of, and part I of the schedule to, the Civil Procedure Acts Repeal Act 1879 (42 & 43 Vict. c. 59), which came into force on 15 August 1879.

Sections 1 to 3 and 5 to 7 were repealed by section 4 of the Statute Law Revision and Civil Procedure Act 1883 (46 & 47 Vict. c. 49). But see section 7 of that act as to the Lancaster Palatine Court and the inferior civil courts (now abolished).

Sections 99(1)(f) and (g) of, and schedule 1 to, the Supreme Court of Judicature (Consolidation) Act 1925 (15 & 16 Geo. 5. c. 49) provided that the whole act, so far as unrepealed, could be repealed by rules of court made under section 99 of that act.

In Section 8, the words from "from and after" to "ninety and seven" were repealed by section 1 of, and the first schedule to, the Statute Law Revision Act 1948 (11 & 12 Geo. 6. c. 62), which came into force on 30 July 1948.

== See also ==
- Administration of Justice Act
