= Warrant of attorney =

Prior English law

In prior English law, a warrant of attorney was a security authorizing a solicitor to collect a debt on behalf of a creditor. It is now subsumed in the general power of attorney.

A warrant of attorney was a security for money in the form of an authority to a solicitor named by a creditor, empowering him to sign judgment in an action against the debtor for the sum due, with a defeasance—a clause that the warrant shall not be put into force in case of due payment of the money secured. It was often used as a collateral security, either for the payment of an annuity or with mortgages, in order that the mortgagee, by entering up judgment, might obtain priority in the administration of the assets of the mortgagor. The Debtors Act 1869 contained various provisions for making known to the debtor the extent of the liability incurred by him, among others that the warrant must be executed in the presence of a solicitor named by the debtor, and that it and the defeasance must be written on the same paper. A warrant of attorney was required to be duly stamped, generally as a mortgage, and to be registered as a judgment in the central office of the Supreme Court.
