= Administration of Justice Act 1705 =

Act of the Parliament of England

Administration of Justice Act 1705 (Note: The citation of this act by this short title was authorised by section 5 of, and the second schedule to, the Statute Law Revision Act 1948. Due to the repeal of those provisions, it is now authorised by section 19(2) of the Interpretation Act 1978.)
- Act of Parliament
- Parliament of England
- Long title: An Act for the Amendment of the Law, and the better Advancement of Justice. (Note: These words are printed against this act in the second column of the second schedule to the Statute Law Revision Act 1948, which is headed "Title".)
- Citation: 4 & 5 Ann. c. 3 (Note: This is the citation in The Statutes of the Realm.); 4 Ann. c. 16 (Note: This is the citation in The Statutes at Large.)
- Territorial extent: England and Wales

Dates
- Royal assent: 19 March 1706
- Commencement: 25 October 1705 (Note: Start of session.)
- Repealed: 27 April 1965 (Note: The Administration of Justice Act 1965 (Commencement No. 1) Order 1965)
Other legislation
Amends	Limitation Act 1623
Amended by	Juries Act 1825; Admiralty, &c. Acts Repeal Act 1865; Statute Law Revision Act 1867; Statute Law Revision Act 1871; Civil Procedure Acts Repeal Act 1879; Statute Law Revision and Civil Procedure Act 1883; Statute Law Revision Act 1888; Law of Property Act 1925; Limitation Act 1939; Statute Law Revision Act 1948
Repealed by	Administration of Justice Act 1965

Status: Repealed

Text of statute as originally enacted

The Administration of Justice Act 1705 (4 & 5 Ann. c. 3) was an act of the Parliament of England.

== Subsequent developments ==
Section 20 of the act was repealed by section 1 of, and the schedule to, the Statute Law Revision Act 1871 (34 & 35 Vict. c. 116), which came into force on 21 August 1871.

Sections 22, 23 and 25 of the act were repealed by section 2 of, and part I of the schedule to, the Civil Procedure Acts Repeal Act 1879 (42 & 43 Vict. c. 59), which came into force on 15 August 1879.

Sections 9 and 10 of the act were repealed by section 207 of, and the seventh schedule to, the Law of Property Act 1925 (15 & 16 Geo. 5. c. 20).

Section 17–19 of the act were repealed by section 34(4) of, and the schedule to, the Limitation Act 1939 (2 & 3 Geo. 6. c. 21), which came into force on 1 July 1940.

Sections 12 and 13, and the words from "from and after" to "Trinity term" and the words "and all the statutes of jeofails" in section 24 of the act were repealed by section 1 of, and the first schedule to, the Statute Law Revision Act 1948 (11 & 12 Geo. 6. c. 62), which came into force on 30 July 1948.

The whole act was repealed by section 34(1) of, and schedule 2 to, the Administration of Justice Act 1965, which came into force on 27 April 1965.

== See also ==
- Administration of Justice Act
