= List of acts of the Parliament of England from 1705 =

This is a list of acts of the Parliament of England for the year 1705.

For acts passed during the period 1707–1800, see the list of acts of the Parliament of Great Britain. See also the list of acts of the Parliament of Scotland, and the list of acts of the Parliament of Ireland.

For acts passed from 1801 onwards, see the list of acts of the Parliament of the United Kingdom. For acts of the devolved parliaments and assemblies in the United Kingdom, see the list of acts of the Scottish Parliament, the list of acts of the Northern Ireland Assembly, and the list of acts and measures of Senedd Cymru; see also the list of acts of the Parliament of Northern Ireland.

For medieval statutes, etc. that are not considered to be acts of Parliament, see the list of English statutes.

See also the List of ordinances and acts of the Parliament of England, 1642–1660 for ordinances and acts passed by the Long Parliament and other bodies without royal assent, and which were not considered to be valid legislation following the Restoration in 1660.

The number shown after each act's title is its chapter number. Acts are cited using this number, preceded by the years of the reign during which the relevant parliamentary session was held; thus the Union with Ireland Act 1800 is cited as "39 & 40 Geo. 3. c. 67", meaning the 67th act passed during the session that started in the 39th year of the reign of George III and which finished in the 40th year of that reign. The modern convention is to use Arabic numerals in citations (thus "41 Geo. 3" rather than "41 Geo. III"). Acts of the last session of the Parliament of Great Britain and the first session of the Parliament of the United Kingdom are both cited as "41 Geo. 3".

Acts passed by the Parliament of England did not have a short title; however, some of these acts have subsequently been given a short title by acts of the Parliament of the United Kingdom, such as the Short Titles Act 1896 (59 & 60 Vict. c. 14).

Acts passed by the Parliament of England were deemed to have come into effect on the first day of the session in which they were passed. Because of this, the years given in the list below may in fact be the year before a particular act was passed.

== 4 & 5 Ann. ==
The first session of the 2nd Parliament of Queen Anne, which met from 25 October 1705 until 19 March 1706.

This session was also traditionally cited as 4 & 5 Anne, 4 & 5 A., 4 Ann. or 4 A. (Ruffhead's The Statutes at Large).

=== Public acts ===
Short title	Citation	Royal assent
Long title
Land Tax Act 1705 (repealed)	4 & 5 Ann. c. 1 (Note: This is the citation in The Statutes of the Realm.); 4 Ann. c. 2 (Note: This is the citation in The Statutes at Large.)	21 December 1705
An Act for granting an Aid to Her Majesty by a Land Tax, to be raised in the Year One Thousand Seven Hundred and Six. (Repealed by Statute Law Revision Act 1867 (30 & 31 Vict. c. 59))
River Stower Navigation Act 1705 or the River Stour Navigation Act 1705	4 & 5 Ann. c. 2; 4 Ann. c. 15	16 February 1706
An Act for making the River Stower navigable, from the Town of Maningtree, in the County of Essex, to the Town of Sudbury, in the County of Suffolk.
Administration of Justice Act 1705 (repealed)	4 & 5 Ann. c. 3; 4 Ann. c. 16	19 March 1706
An Act for the Amendment of the Law, and the better Advancement of Justice. (Repealed by Administration of Justice Act 1965 (c. 2))
Bankruptcy Act 1705 (repealed)	4 & 5 Ann. c. 4; 4 Ann. c. 17	19 March 1706
An Act to prevent Frauds frequently committed by Bankrupts. (Repealed by Statute Law Revision Act 1867 (30 & 31 Vict. c. 59))
Parton Harbour Act 1705	4 & 5 Ann. c. 5; 4 Ann. c. 18	19 March 1706
An Act for enlarging the Pier and Harbour of Parton, in the County of Cumberland.
Navy Act 1705 (repealed)	4 & 5 Ann. c. 6; 4 Ann. c. 19	19 March 1706
An Act for the Encouragement and Increase of Seamen, and for the better and speedier manning Her Majesty's Fleet. (Repealed by Statute Law Revision Act 1867 (30 & 31 Vict. c. 59))
Eddystone Lighthouse Act 1705 (repealed)	4 & 5 Ann. c. 7; 4 Ann. c. 20	19 March 1706
An Act for the better enabling the Master, Wardens, and Assistants, of Trinity House, to rebuild the Light-house on The Edystone Rock. (Repealed by Statute Law Revision Act 1867 (30 & 31 Vict. c. 59))
Fish Act 1705 (repealed)	4 & 5 Ann. c. 8; 4 Ann. c. 21	19 March 1706
An Act for the Increase and better Preservation of Salmon, and other Fish, in the Rivers within the Counties of Southampton and Wilts. (Repealed by Salmon Fishery Act 1861 (24 & 25 Vict. c. 109))
The Mint Act 1705 (repealed)	4 & 5 Ann. c. 9; 4 Ann. c. 22	19 March 1706
An Act to empower the Lord High Treasurer, or Commissioners of the Treasury, to issue, out of the Monies arising by the Coinage Duty, any Sum not exceeding Five Hundred Pounds, over and above the Sum of Three Thousand Pounds Yearly, for the Uses of the Mint. (Repealed by Statute Law Revision Act 1867 (30 & 31 Vict. c. 59))
Militia Act 1705 (repealed)	4 & 5 Ann. c. 10; 4 Ann. c. 23	19 March 1706
An Act for raising the Militia for the Year One Thousand Seven Hundred and Six, notwithstanding the Month's Pay formerly advanced be not re-paid; and for an Accompt to be made of Trophy-monies. (Repealed by Statute Law Revision Act 1867 (30 & 31 Vict. c. 59))
Forfeited Estates, Ireland Act 1705 (repealed)	4 & 5 Ann. c. 11; 4 Ann. c. 24	19 March 1706
An Act to enlarge the Time for registering unsatisfied Debentures upon the forfeited Estates in Ireland; and for renewing of other Debentures, which have been lost, burnt, or destroyed. (Repealed by Statute Law Revision Act 1867 (30 & 31 Vict. c. 59))
Payment of Certain Regiments Act 1705 (repealed)	4 & 5 Ann. c. 12; 4 Ann. c. 25	19 March 1706
An Act for the paying and clearing the several Regiments commanded by Lieutenant General Stewart, Colonel Hill, and Brigadier Holt; and for supplying the Defect of the Muster Rolls of those and several other Regiments. (Repealed by Statute Law Revision Act 1867 (30 & 31 Vict. c. 59))
See of Dublin Act 1705	4 & 5 Ann. c. 13; 4 Ann. c. 26	19 March 1706
An Act for making effectual a Grant of Their late Majesties King William and Queen Mary, of the Town and Lands of Sea-Town, to the Archbishopric of Dublin; and for restoring the same to the said See.
Princess Sophia, Naturalization Act 1705 (repealed)	4 & 5 Ann. c. 14; 4 Ann. c. 1	3 December 1705
An Act for exhibiting a Bill in this present Parliament, for naturalizing the most Excellent Princess Sophia Electress and Dutchess Dowager of Hanover, and the Issue of her Body. (Repealed by Statute Law Revision Act 1867 (30 & 31 Vict. c. 59))
Union of England and Scotland Act 1705 (repealed)	4 & 5 Ann. c. 15; 4 Ann. c. 3	21 December 1705
An Act to repeal several Clauses in the Statute made in the Third and Fourth Years of Her present Majesty's Reign, for securing the Kingdom of England from several Acts lately passed in the Parliament of Scotland. (Repealed by Statute Law Revision Act 1867 (30 & 31 Vict. c. 59))
Princess Sophia Naturalization Act 1705 or the Sophia Naturalization Act 1705 (repealed)	4 & 5 Ann. c. 16; 4 Ann. c. 4	21 December 1705
An Act for the Naturalization of the most Excellent Princess Sophia, Electress and Dutchess Dowager of Hanover, and the Issue of her Body. (Repealed by British Nationality Act 1948 (11 & 12 Geo. 6. c. 56))
Taxation Act 1705 (repealed)	4 & 5 Ann. c. 17; 4 Ann. c. 5	16 February 1706
An Act for continuing the Duties upon Malt, Mum, Cyder, and Perry, for the Service of the Year One Thousand Seven Hundred and Six. (Repealed by Statute Law Revision Act 1867 (30 & 31 Vict. c. 59))
Taxation (No. 2) Act 1705 (repealed)	4 & 5 Ann. c. 18; 4 Ann. c. 6	16 February 1706
An Act for continuing an additional Subsidy of Tonnage and Poundage, and certain Duties upon Coals, Culm, and Cinders, and additional Duties of Excise; and for settling and establishing a Fund thereby, and by other Ways and Means, for Payment of Annuities, to be sold, for raising a further Supply to Her Majesty, for the Service of the Year One Thousand Seven Hundred and Six, and other Uses therein mentioned. (Repealed by Statute Law Revision Act 1867 (30 & 31 Vict. c. 59))
Exportation Act 1705 (repealed)	4 & 5 Ann. c. 19; 4 Ann. c. 7	16 February 1706
An Act for making the Town of New Rosse, in the County of Wexford, in the Kingdom of Ireland, a Port for the exporting Wool from Ireland into this Kingdom. (Repealed by Statute Law Revision Act 1867 (30 & 31 Vict. c. 59))
Regency Act 1705 (repealed)	4 & 5 Ann. c. 20; 4 Ann. c. 8	19 March 1706
An Act for the better Security of Her Majesty's Person and Government, and of the Succession to the Crown of England in the Protestant Line. (Repealed by Statute Law Revision Act 1867 (30 & 31 Vict. c. 59))
Recruiting Act 1705 (repealed)	4 & 5 Ann. c. 21; 4 Ann. c. 10	19 March 1706
An Act for the better recruiting Her Majesty's Army and Marines. (Repealed by Statute Law Revision Act 1867 (30 & 31 Vict. c. 59))
Mutiny Act 1705 (repealed)	4 & 5 Ann. c. 22; 4 Ann. c. 11	19 March 1706
An Act for continuing an Act made in the Session held in the Third and Fourth Years of Her Majesty's Reign, intituled, "An Act for punishing Mutiny and Desertion, and false Musters; and for the better Payment of the Army and Quarters." (Note: Mutiny Act 1704 (3 & 4 Ann. c. 5)) (Repealed by Statute Law Revision Act 1867 (30 & 31 Vict. c. 59))
Taxation, etc. Act 1705 (repealed)	4 & 5 Ann. c. 23; 4 Ann. c. 12	19 March 1706
An Act for laying further Duties on Low Wines; and for preventing the Damage to Her Majesty's Revenue by Importation of Foreign Cut Whalebone; and for making some Provisions as to the Stamp Duties, and the Duties on Births, Burials, and Marriages, and the Salt Duties, and touching Million Lottery Tickets; and for enabling Her Majesty to dispose the Effects of William Kidd, a notorious Pirate, to the Use of Greenwich Hospital; and for appropriating the Public Monies granted in this Session of Parliament. (Repealed by Statute Law Revision Act 1867 (30 & 31 Vict. c. 59))
Thames Watermen Act 1705 (repealed)	4 & 5 Ann. c. 24; 4 Ann. c. 13	19 March 1706
An Act for the better ordering and governing the Watermen and Lightermen upon the River of Thames. (Repealed by Thames Watermen and Lightermen Act 1827 (7 & 8 Geo. 4. c. lxxv))
Collection of Charity Money Act 1705 (repealed)	4 & 5 Ann. c. 25; 4 Ann. c. 14	19 March 1706
An Act for the better collecting Charity-money on Briefs by Letters Patents, and preventing Abuses in relation to such Charities. (Repealed by Church Building Society Act 1828 (9 Geo. 4. c. 42))
Chester Highways Act 1705	4 & 5 Ann. c. 26; 4 Ann. c. 9	19 March 1706
An Act for repairing the Highways between Barnehill and Hatton Heath, in the County of Chester.
St. Bride's Tithe Act 1705 (repealed)	4 & 5 Ann. c. 27 (Note: Also listed as 4 & 5 Ann. c. 32 Pr.); 4 Ann. c. 27	19 March 1706
An Act for settling the Impropriate Tithes of the Parish of St. Bridget, alias Bride's, London. (Repealed by City of London (Various Powers) Act 1950 (14 Geo. 6. c. v))

=== Private acts ===
Short title	Citation	Royal assent
Long title
Thomas Chute's Estate Act 1705	4 & 5 Ann. c. 1 Pr. (Note: This is the citation in The Statutes of the Realm.); 4 Ann. c. 1 Pr. (Note: This is the citation in The Statutes at Large.)	21 December 1705
An Act for Sale of the Estate late of Thomas Chute Esquire, in the County of Warwick; and laying out the Monies arising thereby in the Purchase of other Lands and Hereditaments, in the County of Norfolke, to be settled to the same Uses as the Warwickshire Estate stands settled.
Naturalization of William Burnet Act 1705	4 & 5 Ann. c. 2 Pr. 4 Ann. c. 2 Pr.	21 December 1705
An Act for naturalizing William Burnet Esquire.
Naturalization of Peter Silvestre Act 1705	4 & 5 Ann. c. 3 Pr. 4 Ann. c. 3 Pr.	21 December 1705
An Act for naturalizing Peter Silvestre Doctor of Physick.
Naturalization of Adelaide Duchess of Shrewsbury Act 1705	4 & 5 Ann. c. 4 Pr. 4 Ann. c. 4 Pr.	16 February 1706
An Act for naturalizing Adelaide Dutchess of Shrewsbury.
Exchange of parsonage house and glebe lands belonging to Watton at Stone rectory (Hertfordshire) for another house and lands in Watton at Stone belonging to Philip Boteler.	4 & 5 Ann. c. 5 Pr. 4 Ann. c. 5 Pr.	16 February 1706
An Act for the exchanging the Parsonage-house, and certain Glebe Lands, belonging to the Rectory of Watton at Stone, in the County of Hertford, for a certain other House and Lands, of greater Value, lying in Watton at Stone aforesaid, of and belonging to Philip Boteler Esquire.
Enabling Sir Thomas Cave to sell lands in Northamptonshire for payment of siblings' portions and settlement of other lands in Northamptonshire and Leicestershire to the same uses.	4 & 5 Ann. c. 6 Pr. 4 Ann. c. 6 Pr.	16 February 1706
An Act to enable Sir Thomas Gave Baronet to sell certain Lands in the County of Northampton, to raise Money, to pay his Brothers and Sisters Portions; and settle other Lands, in the said County of Northampton and County of Leicester, of better Value, to the same Uses.
Confirmation of the marriage agreement of Charles and Dorothy Owen of Nash (Pembrokeshire).	4 & 5 Ann. c. 7 Pr. 4 Ann. c. 7 Pr.	16 February 1706
An Act for confirming an Agreement made upon the Marriage of Charles Owen Esquire and Dorothy his Wife, of Nash, in the County of Pembroke.
James Hamilton's Estate Act 1705	4 & 5 Ann. c. 8 Pr. 4 Ann. c. 8 Pr.	16 February 1706
An Act for Sale of Part of the Estate of James Hamilton Esquire, a Minor, for Payment of his Debts; and for raising Portions for Younger Children; and for making Fee-farms and Leases for Lives during his Minority.
Supplying a defect in the appointment of provisions for Henry Smalman's younger children and making such provisions more effectual.	4 & 5 Ann. c. 9 Pr. 4 Ann. c. 9 Pr.	16 February 1706
An Act for supplying a Defect (by the Death of a Trustee) in the Appointment of Provisions for the Younger Children of Henry Smalman Esquire, deceased; and for making the said Provision more effectual for such Younger Children.
Enabling John Edwards to sell lands in Norfolk for payment of debts.	4 & 5 Ann. c. 10 Pr. 4 Ann. c. 10 Pr.	16 February 1706
An Act to enable John Edwards Gentleman to sell certain Lands, in the County of Norfolke, for Payment of Debts.
To permit the making of clothes with cloth buttons for export for clothing the army of the allies notwithstanding the Act against cloth buttons.	4 & 5 Ann. c. 11 Pr. 4 Ann. c. 11 Pr.	16 February 1706
An Act to permit the making up of Cloaths with Buttons of Cloth, for Exportation, for cloathing the Army of the Allies, notwithstanding the Act against Cloth Buttons. (Note: Buttons Act 1698 (10 Will. 3. c. 2))
Relief of Sir Stephen Evance and Henry Cornish.	4 & 5 Ann. c. 12 Pr. 4 Ann. c. 12 Pr.	16 February 1706
An Act for the Relief of Sir Steven Evance Knight, and Henry Cornish Esquire.
John Asgill's relief relating to his purchase of part of the forfeited estates in Ireland.	4 & 5 Ann. c. 13 Pr. 4 Ann. c. 13 Pr.	16 February 1706
An Act for Relief of John Asgill Esquire, in relation to the Purchase of Part of the forfeited Estates in Ireland.
Naturalization of William Lewis Legrand.	4 & 5 Ann. c. 14 Pr. 4 Ann. c. 14 Pr.	16 February 1706
An Act for naturalizing William Lewis Legrand.
Relief of Colonel Samuel Venner.	4 & 5 Ann. c. 15 Pr. 4 Ann. c. 15 Pr.	16 February 1706
An Act for the Relief of Colonel Samuel Venner.
Naturalizing Jacob Pechells and others.	4 & 5 Ann. c. 16 Pr. 4 Ann. c. 16 Pr.	16 February 1706
An Act for naturalizing Jacob Pechells and others.
Enabling James Duke of Ormond and Charles Earl of Arran to settle fee farm rents in Tipperary (Ireland) pursuant to the earl's marriage agreement, and making good several grants in fee farm by the earl.	4 & 5 Ann. c. 17 Pr. 4 Ann. c. 17 Pr.	19 March 1706
An Act for enabling James Duke of Ormonde and Charles Earl of Arran to settle Fee-farm Rents, in the County of Tipperary, in the Kingdom of Ireland, pursuant to an Agreement upon the Marriage of the said Earl of Arran; and for making good several Grants made by the said Earl in Feefarm.
Evelyn Earl of Kingston-upon-Hull's Estate Act 1705	4 & 5 Ann. c. 18 Pr. 4 Ann. c. 18 Pr.	19 March 1706
An Act for vesting the Inheritance of a Messuage and Gardens, in Acton, in the County of Middl'x, purchased by the Right Honourable Evelyn Earl of Kingston upon Hull, in Trustees, for the said Earl and his Heirs.
Edward Earl of Conway's Will Act 1705	4 & 5 Ann. c. 19 Pr. 4 Ann. c. 19 Pr.	19 March 1706
An Act for making the Exemplification (Note: Exemplified copy) of the Will of Edward late Earl of Conway, under the Seal of the Court of Chancery in the Kingdom of Ireland, and the Depositions relating to the same, Evidence on Hearings in Equity and Trials at Law.
Viscount Howe's Estate Act 1705	4 & 5 Ann. c. 20 Pr. 4 Ann. c. 20 Pr.	19 March 1706
An Act to enable Scrope Lord Viscount Howe of the Kingdom of Ireland to make a certain Provision for his Daughters by his First Wife; that which was intended being, as expressed in the Marriage Settlement, uncertain and contingent.
Richard Lord Bulkeley Viscount Cashel's Estate Act 1705	4 & 5 Ann. c. 21 Pr. 4 Ann. c. 21 Pr.	19 March 1706
An Act to enlarge the Power of Richard Lord Bulkley, Viscount Cashells in the Kingdom of Ireland, of leasing his Estate in Cheshire, for Performance and Satisfaction of the Trusts upon the said Estate.
Henry Lord Colerane's estate in Ireland: sale of part and supply of the want of enrollment of a deed concerning another part.	4 & 5 Ann. c. 22 Pr. 4 Ann. c. 22 Pr.	19 March 1706
An Act for Sale of Part of the Estate of Henry Lord Coleraine, Baron of Coleraine in the Kingdom of Ireland; and supplying the Want of Enrolment of a Deed concerning other Part of his Estate.
To remedy the defect of a common recovery suffered by Philip Smith, Viscount Strangford, and his eldest son, George, and of the deed which declared its uses.	4 & 5 Ann. c. 23 Pr. 4 Ann. c. 23 Pr.	19 March 1706
An Act for the supplying the Defect of a Common Recovery suffered by Philip Smith Esquire, Viscount Strangford of the Kingdom of Ireland, and George Smith Esquire, his Eldest Son, and of the Deed which declared the Uses of the said Recovery.
Sir Edwin Sadleir's Estate Act 1705	4 & 5 Ann. c. 24 Pr. 4 Ann. c. 24 Pr.	19 March 1706
An Act for the Sale of the Manor of Temple Dionisley, alias Dinsley, and other Lands, in the County of Hertford, for the Payment of the Debts of Sir Edwin Sadleir Baronet, and other Purposes.
Enabling Sir John Humble and his trustees to settle lands in Lincolnshire, Surrey and Kent pursuant to his marriage settlement with Dame Sarah his wife.	4 & 5 Ann. c. 25 Pr. 4 Ann. c. 25 Pr.	19 March 1706
An Act to enable Sir John Humble Baronet, and his Trustees, to settle several Messuages, Lands, and Hereditaments, lying in the Counties of Lincolne, Surrey, and Kent, pursuant to the Articles and Agreements made upon his Marriage with Dame Sarah, his now Wife.
Richard Bold's Estate Act 1705	4 & 5 Ann. c. 26 Pr. 4 Ann. c. 26 Pr.	19 March 1706
An Act for vesting the Estate late of Richard Bold Esquire in Trustees, to be leased, sold, or mortgaged, for raising the Portions, Debts, and Monies, to which the same is liable.
John Abington's Estate Act 1705	4 & 5 Ann. c. 27 Pr. 4 Ann. c. 27 Pr.	19 March 1706
An Act for vesting certain Terms for Forty Years in Trustees, which were granted by John Abington Esquire, deceased; and to empower them to grant, renew, and fill up Leases, according to the Usage of the Manor therein mentioned; and for raising Portions for the Younger Children of the said John Abington.
John Digby's Estate Act 1705	4 & 5 Ann. c. 28 Pr. 4 Ann. c. 28 Pr.	19 March 1706
An Act for vesting the Equity of Redemption of the Lands and Tenements, lying in the County of Leicester, late the Estate of John Digby Esquire, deceased, in Trustees, to the Intent that the same may be sold, for the discharging of the Mortgages and other Incumbrances thereon.
Empowering Thomas Cary and George Hartley to import a quantity of French wines from Copenhagen contracted for before 1 January 1704.	4 & 5 Ann. c. 29 Pr. 4 Ann. c. 29	19 March 1706
An Act to empower Thomas Carey and George Hatley, of London, Merchants, to import the Remainder of a Quantity of French Wines from Copenhagen, contracted for before the First Day of January One Thousand Seven Hundred and Four.
William Huggessen's Estate Act 1705	4 & 5 Ann. c. 30 Pr. 4 Ann. c. 30 Pr.	19 March 1706
An Act to enable Trustees to make Provision for Payment of Debts of William Hugessen Esquire; and for raising Portions for his Younger Sons; and for making good the intended Settlement upon the Marriage of William Hugessen the Younger, Gentleman.
Thomas Deane's Estate Act 1705	4 & 5 Ann. c. 31 Pr. 4 Ann. c. 31 Pr.	19 March 1706
An Act for Sale of Lands, in the Counties of Southampton and Dorset, late the Estate of Thomas Deane Esquire, deceased, for Payment of the Debts and Legacies charged thereupon; and for other Purposes therein mentioned.
St. Bride's Tithe Act 1705 (repealed)	4 & 5 Ann. c. 32 Pr. (Note: Also listed as 4 & 5 Ann. c. 27.); 4 Ann. c. 27	19 March 1706
An Act for settling the Impropriate Tithes of the Parish of St. Bridget, alias Bride's, London. (Repealed by City of London (Various Powers) Act 1950 (14 Geo. 6. c. v))
Lichfield Chapter Act 1706	4 & 5 Ann. c. 33 Pr. 4 Ann. c. 32 Pr.	19 March 1706
An Act for augmenting the Number of Canons Residentiary in the Cathedral Church of Lichfield, and for improving the Deanry and Prebends of the said Cathedral.
Relief of non commission officers and private soldiers of Lord Drogheda's and Colonel Coot's Regiments.	4 & 5 Ann. c. 34 Pr. 4 Ann. c. 33 Pr.	19 March 1706
An Act for the Relief of Non-commission Officers and Private Soldiers of the Lord Drogheda's and Colonel Coot's Regiments.
Christopher Pegg's Estate Act 1705	4 & 5 Ann. c. 35 Pr. 4 Ann. c. 34 Pr.	19 March 1706
An Act for Sale of the Manor and Estate of and in Hethersedge and Dore, in the County of Derby, the Estate of Christopher Pegg Esquire; and mortgaging Part of his Manor and Estate, of and in Beaucliff and Strawberry Lee, in the same County, for raising Money, for Payment of Debts and Incumbrances thereon, and for making Provision for his Family.
Enabling William Gomeldon to sell a farm in Kent to discharge an incumbrance on it and to pay his debts.	4 & 5 Ann. c. 36 Pr. 4 Ann. c. 35 Pr.	19 March 1706
An Act to enable William Gomeldon Esquire to sell a Farm in Kent, to discharge an Incumbrance upon the same; and to apply the Residue of the Monies arising by such Sale in Payment of the said William Gomeldon's Debts.
Humphrey Courtney's Estate Act 1705	4 & 5 Ann. c. 37 Pr. 4 Ann. c. 36 Pr.	19 March 1706
An Act for vesting a Mortgage of Humphry Courtney Esquire, deceased, in Trustees, to be sold, to discharge the Mortgages, Debts, and Incumbrances, on the said Estate.
Morris Goulston's Estate Act 1705	4 & 5 Ann. c. 38 Pr. 4 Ann. c. 37 Pr.	19 March 1706
An Act for vesting in Trustees the Estate of Maurice Goulstone Esquire, for the raising his Sisters Portions, and Payment of Debts; and other Purposes therein mentioned.
Nicholas Row's Estate Act 1705	4 & 5 Ann. c. 39 Pr. 4 Ann. c. 38 Pr.	19 March 1706
An Act for vesting certain Messuages and Lands, in the Counties of Devon and Cornwall, of Nicholas Row Esquire, in Trustees, to be sold; and applying the greatest Part of the Purchase-money to the Uses of his Marriage Settlement, and the Residue for Payment of Debts.
Relief of Colonel John Rice Act 1705	4 & 5 Ann. c. 40 Pr. 4 Ann. c. 39 Pr.	19 March 1706
An Act for the Relief of Colonel John Rice.
Mathew Holworthy's Estate Act 1705	4 & 5 Ann. c. 41 Pr. 4 Ann. c. 40 Pr.	19 March 1706
An Act for the removing all Doubts touching the Saving Clause of One Act of Parliament, (Note: Mathew Holworthy's Estate Act 1703 (2 & 3 Ann. c. 34 Pr.)) intituled, "An Act for vesting divers Manors and Lands of Mathew Holworthy Esquire in Trustees, to be sold; and purchasing other Manors or Lands, of equal Value; and limiting the Manors or Lands to be purchased to the same Uses as the Lands to be sold are limited."
William Forbes' Estate Act 1705	4 & 5 Ann. c. 42 Pr. 4 Ann. c. 41 Pr.	19 March 1706
An Act for Sale of the Manor of Barwick Hall, and other Lands, in the County of Essex, the Estate of William Forbes Esquire; and for purchasing other Lands, to be settled to the same Uses.
Richard Thornhill's Estate Act 1705	4 & 5 Ann. c. 43 Pr. 4 Ann. c. 42 Pr.	19 March 1706
An Act to vest certain Lands and Tenements, in the County of Kent, the Estate of Richard Thornhill Esquire, in Trustees, to be sold, for the Payment of Debts, and his Sisters Portions charged thereupon; and for securing the Residue of the Purchase-money to the Uses of his Marriage Settlement.
Enabling John Brett Fisher and Judith his wife to sell lands for payment of his debts and making provision for his wife and future children.	4 & 5 Ann. c. 44 Pr. 4 Ann. c. 43 Pr.	19 March 1706
An Act to enable John Brett Fisher Esquire and Judith his Wife to sell Lands, for the Payment of his Debts, and making Provision for his Wife and Children, in case they shall have any.
Bugden Act 1705	4 & 5 Ann. c. 45 Pr. 4 Ann. c. 44 Pr.	19 March 1706
An Act to enable John Williams, an Infant, notwithstanding his Infancy, to renew a Lease of the Parsonage of Bugden, (Note: Buckden, Cambridgeshire) held under One of the Prebendaries of the Cathedral Church of Lincoln; and also for settling the Prebend of Bugden as an Augmentation for the Vicar of Bugden; and vesting the Ecclesiastical Jurisdiction of the Parish of Bugden in the Bishop of Lincoln.
John Stanhope's Estate Act 1705	4 & 5 Ann. c. 46 Pr. 4 Ann. c. 45 Pr.	19 March 1706
An Act for the Sale of Lands, in the County of Lincoln, late the Estate of John Stanhope Esquire, deceased, for Payment of his Debts.
Henry Raper's Estate Act 1705	4 & 5 Ann. c. 47 Pr. 4 Ann. c. 46 Pr.	19 March 1706
An Act for taking the Estate in Law of a Mortgage made by John Sands Esquire, which is descended to Daughters and Coheirs of John Pargiter deceased (who are Infants), (fn. 3) they being only Trustees for Henry Raper Merchant.
Empowering the Treasury to compound with Thomas Tomkins and John Chagneau and their securities for the debts owing by them to Her Majesty.	4 & 5 Ann. c. 48 Pr. 4 Ann. c. 47 Pr.	19 March 1706
An Act to empower the Lord High Treasurer of England, or Commissioners of the Treasury, for the Time being, to compound with Thomas Tomkins and John Chagneau, and their Securities, for the Debts owing by them respectively to Her Majesty.
Elizabeth Hicks' Estate Act 1705	4 & 5 Ann. c. 49 Pr. 4 Ann. c. 48 Pr.	19 March 1706
An Act to enable Trustees to sell several Houses and Lands, in and near Portsmouth, late the Estate of Elizabeth Hicks, for Payment of a Debt, and Interest charged thereupon; and for laying out the Residue of the Money in other Lands, to be settled to the same Uses.
Thomas Gower's Estate Act 1705	4 & 5 Ann. c. 50 Pr. 4 Ann. c. 49 Pr.	19 March 1706
An Act for vesting the Freehold and Copyhold Estate of Thomas Gower Gentleman, deceased, in Trustees, to be sold, for Payment of Debts; and settling the Remainder for the Benefit of his Daughters.
Valentine Crome's Estate Act 1705	4 & 5 Ann. c. 51 Pr. 4 Ann. c. 50 Pr.	19 March 1706
An Act for vesting the Estate of Valentine Crome, of Maiden-Early, in the County of Berks, Gentleman; in Trustees, to be sold, for Payment of his Father's Debts, and making a Provision for himself and Brother.
John Ballet's Estate Act 1705	4 & 5 Ann. c. 52 Pr. 4 Ann. c. 51 Pr.	19 March 1706
An Act for the Sale of Lands late of John Ballet Gentleman, deceased, for the more speedy Payment of his Debts, and raising Portions for his Younger Children.
William and Thomas Lambard's Estate Act 1705	4 & 5 Ann. c. 53 Pr. 4 Ann. c. 52 Pr.	19 March 1706
An Act for the more effectual assuring of Part of the Lands of Inheritance of William and Thomas Lambard, in the County of Kent, pursuant to a Deed of Settlement; and for assuring (in Lieu of other Part thereof) other Lands of Inheritance therein also mentioned, and for better Provision for Younger Children.
Foulke and his son Meredith Wynne's Estate Act 1705	4 & 5 Ann. c. 54 Pr. 4 Ann. c. 53 Pr.	19 March 1706
An Act for vesting the Capital Messuage and other Lands and Tenements of Foulke Wynne, in the County of Denbigh, Gentleman, and Meredith Wynne his Son, in Trustees, to the Intent that Part thereof may be sold, for Payment of his Debts, and the Residue settled pursuant to Marriage Articles.
Christopher and Christopher Reve's Estate Act 1705	4 & 5 Ann. c. 55 Pr. 4 Ann. c. 54 Pr.	19 March 1706
An Act for vesting the Estates of Christopher Reve the Elder, Clerk, deceased, and of Christopher Reve Clerk, his only Son, also deceased, in certain Trustees, to be sold, for the Payment of their several Debts and Legacies; and for making some Provision for Dorothy, the Widow of the said Christopher Reve the Son, and for Christopher Reve, his only Child, an Infant.
Arthur Vaughan's Estate Act 1705	4 & 5 Ann. c. 56 Pr. 4 Ann. c. 55 Pr.	19 March 1706
An Act for vesting the Estate of Arthur Vaughan, of Tretherwen, in the County of Montgomery, an Infant, in Trustees, to be sold, for Payment of such Debts and Incumbrances to which the same, or the said Infant in respect thereof, is liable.
Elizabeth Hore's Estate Act 1705	4 & 5 Ann. c. 57 Pr. 4 Ann. c. 56 Pr.	19 March 1706
An Act for vesting the Estate of Elizabeth Hore, in the County of Bucks, in Trustees, to be sold; and the Monies arising thereby to be applied for the Payment of Debts charged thereon.
Christopher Fairfax's Estate Act 1705	4 & 5 Ann. c. 58 Pr. 4 Ann. c. 57 Pr.	19 March 1706
An Act for the Sale of the Manor of Eastevening, and other Lands and Hereditaments, in Swineshead, in the County of Lincolne, late the Estate of Christopher Fairfax Gentleman, deceased, for Payment of his Debts, and Benefit of his Children.
Ralph Baldwin's Estate Act 1705	4 & 5 Ann. c. 59 Pr. 4 Ann. c. 58 Pr.	19 March 1706
An Act for vesting Part of the Real Estate of Ralph Baldwin Gentleman in Trustees, for a Provision for his Younger Children.
Robert and Anne Barry's Estate Act 1705	4 & 5 Ann. c. 60 Pr. 4 Ann. c. 59 Pr.	19 March 1706
An Act for settling and securing Part of the Estates of Robert Barry Clerk and Anne his Wife, for the Benefit of the said Anne and her Children; and Sale of other Part of the Estate of the said Robert Barry, for Payment of his Debts.
John Holworthy's Debts Act 1705	4 & 5 Ann. c. 61 Pr. 4 Ann. c. 60 Pr.	19 March 1706
An Act for vesting the Sum of Two Thousand Pounds in Trustees, to be applied to and for the Payment of the Debts of John Holworthy Gentleman, pursuant to an Agreement with his Creditors.
Michael Sorocold's Estate Act 1705	4 & 5 Ann. c. 62 Pr. 4 Ann. c. 61 Pr.	19 March 1706
An Act for the Sale of an Advowson in Sussex; late the Estate of Michael Sorocold Clerk, deceased, for Payment of his Debts, and making Provision for his Widow and Child.
John Viccary's Estate Act 1705	4 & 5 Ann. c. 63 Pr. 4 Ann. c. 63 Pr.	19 March 1706
An Act for Sale of the Estate of John Viccary deceased, in Rockbear, in the County of Devon, for Payment of his Debts charged thereupon, and for Maintenance of his Widow and Children.
Francis Clyes's Debts Act 1705	4 & 5 Ann. c. 64 Pr. 4 Ann. c. 63 Pr.	19 March 1706
An Act to empower the Lord High Treasurer of Engl'd, or Commissioners of the Treasury, for the Time being, to compound with Francis Clyes, as Surety for William Penneck, late of Exon, Merchant, in Six several Bonds for Duties on Tobacco, which the said William Penneck had at the Port of Falmouth, in December One Thousand Seven Hundred and One.
Thomas Cobb's Debts (Correction) Act 1705	4 & 5 Ann. c. 65 Pr. 4 Ann. c. 64 Pr.	19 March 1706
An Act to rectify a Mistake in, and explain, an Act passed in the last Session, (Note: Thomas Cobb's Debts Act 1704 (3 & 4 Ann. c. 17 Pr.)) to empower the Lord High Treasurer, or Commissioners of the Treasury, to compound with Richard Cobb Esquire, as One of the Sureties for Thomas Cobb Gentleman, Receiver General for the County of Southampton and Isle of Wight.
Freedom of Ship L'Amazone Act 1705	4 & 5 Ann. c. 66 Pr. 4 Ann. c. 65 Pr.	19 March 1706
An Act to make the Ship L'Amazone, taken and condemned as a Prize, and sold in the Island of Barbadoes, free.
Naturalizing Paul Francis and Katherine Risley.	4 & 5 Ann. c. 67 Pr. 4 Ann. c. 66 Pr.	19 March 1706
An Act for naturalizing Paul, Frances, and Katherine Risley.
Naturalizing Vincent De Laymerie and others.	4 & 5 Ann. c. 68 Pr. 4 Ann. c. 67 Pr.	19 March 1706
An Act for naturalizing of Vincent De Laymerie and others.

=== Sources ===
- Raithby, John, ed. (1963) [1821]. "4° & 5° Annæ". Statutes of the Realm. Vol. 8: The Statutes of the First to the Sixth Years of the Reign of Queen Anne (1702–1707). London: Dawsons. pp. 382–518 – via HathiTrust.
- Pickering, Danby, ed. (1764). "Anno quarto Annæ". The Statutes at Large. Vol. 11: From the Second to the Eighth Year of Queen Anne. Cambridge: Joseph Bentham. pp. 117–180 – via Internet Archive.
- Pickering, Danby, ed. (1764). "Anno quarto Annæ". The Statutes at Large. Vol. 11: From the Second to the Eighth Year of Queen Anne. Cambridge: Joseph Bentham. pp. 117–180 – via Internet Archive.
- Journals of the House of Commons. Vol. 15. London: His Majesty's Stationery Office. 1803. pp. 5–199 – via Google Books.
- Chronological Table of and Index to the Statutes. Vol. 1: To the End of the Session 59 Vict. Sess. 2 (1895) (13th ed.). London: Her Majesty's Stationery Office. 1896. pp. 84–85 – via Google Books.
- "Chronological Tables of the Private and Personal Acts: Part 6 (1702–1705)". legislation.gov.uk. The National Archives.

== See also ==
- List of acts of the Parliament of England
