= Composition of Yards and Perches =

Medieval English statute of measure

- Act of Parliament
- Parliament of England
- Long title: Compositio Ulnarum et Perticarum
- Citation: Stat. Temp. Incert.
- Territorial extent: England and Wales; Ireland

Dates
- Royal assent: Unknown
- Commencement: Unknown
- Repealed: England and Wales: 28 July 1863; Ireland: 10 August 1872

Other legislation
- Amended by: Weights and Measures Act 1824
- Repealed by: England and Wales: Statute Law Revision Act 1863; Ireland: Statute Law (Ireland) Revision Act 1872
- Relates to: Statute for the Measuring of Land

Status: Repealed

Text of statute as originally enacted

The Composition of Yards and Perches (Latin: Compositio Ulnarum et Perticarum) or the Statute of Ells and Perches was a medieval English statute defining the length of the barleycorn, inch, foot, yard, and perch, as well as the area of the acre. Its date has been estimated at 1266–1303.

The Composition of Yards and Perches belongs to a class of documents known as Statutes of uncertain date generally thought to be from c. 1250 to 1305. Although not originally statutes, they gradually acquired the force of law. In some early statute books Composition of Yards and Perches was appended to another statute of uncertain date, the Statute for the Measuring of Land also known as Statutum de Admensuratione Terrase [An Ordinance for Measuring of Land], sometimes listed as 33° Edward I. st. 6. (1305).

The Latin text from the manuscript known as BL Cotton MS Claudius D 2 is translated in Ruffhead's Statutes at Large as

It is ordained that 3 grains of barley dry and round do make an inch, 12 inches make 1 foot, 3 feet make 1 yard, 5 yards and a half make a perch, and 40 perches in length and 4 in breadth make an acre.

A similar statement is made in Liber Horn (as published in The Statutes of the Realm):

And be it remembered that the iron yard of our Lord the King containeth 3 feet and no more, and a foot ought to contain 12 inches by the right measure of this yard measured, to wit, the 36th part of this yard rightly measured maketh 1 inch neither more nor less and 5 yards and a half make a perch that is 16 feet and a half measured by the aforesaid yard of our Lord the King.

== Subsequent developments ==
The act was extended to Ireland by Poynings' Law 1495 (10 Hen. 7. c. 22 (I)).

The Composition of Yards and Perches was repealed by section 23 of the Weights and Measures Act 1824 (5 Geo. 4. c. 74), with savings.

The whole act was repealed for England and Wales by section 1 of, and the schedule to, the Statute Law Revision Act 1863 (26 & 27 Vict. c. 125), which came into force on 28 July 1863.

The whole act was repealed for Ireland by section 1 of, and the schedule to, the Statute Law (Ireland) Revision Act 1872 (35 & 36 Vict. c. 98), which came into force on 10 August 1872.

== See also ==
- Weights and Measures Acts
