= Statute of Bigamy =

Act of the Parliament of England

- Act of Parliament
- Parliament of England
- Long title: Statutum de Bigamis.
- Citation: 4 Edw. 1
- Territorial extent: England and Wales; Ireland

Dates
- Royal assent: 1276
- Commencement: 1276
- Repealed: England and Wales: 28 July 1863; Ireland: 10 August 1872

Other legislation
- Repealed by: England and Wales: Statute Law Revision Act 1863; Ireland: Statute Law (Ireland) Revision Act 1872

Status: Repealed

Text of statute as originally enacted

The Statute of Bigamy (Latin: Statutum de Bigamis, 4 Edw. 1) was an English law passed in 1276. It encompassed six chapters on a variety of subjects, but took its name from the fifth chapter, which removed benefit of clergy from men found to have committed bigamy by an ecclesiastical court.

It has sometimes been that a man from wickedness has married several women, all living at the same time; but Holy Church says that of such women none but the first is his lawful wife; wherefore, the law regards the others only as false wives

— Britton

The legislation was passed in the fourth year of the reign of Edward I. The statute was an adoption of the council of Lyon decision of omni priviligio clericali nudati et coercioni fori secularis addicti during 1274. The stratatum treated the misdemeanour as an act of capital crime. At the time of the law having been brought into force, clergy considering bigamous occurrences already within their number were desiring that punishment be decided via the common law in order that those persons be treated less severely, Pope Gregory X decreed otherwise. By the time of the son of king Henry the VIII in the 16th century, the king of England by statute had had the prospective clerical impediment issue revoked.

== Subsequent developments ==
The act was extended to Ireland by Poynings' Law 1495 (10 Hen. 7. c. 22 (I)).

The whole act was repealed for England and Wales by section 1 of, and the schedule to, the Statute Law Revision Act 1863 (26 & 27 Vict. c. 125), which came into force on 28 July 1863.

The whole act was repealed for Ireland by section 1 of, and the schedule to, the Statute Law (Ireland) Revision Act 1872 (35 & 36 Vict. c. 98), which came into force on 10 August 1872.
