= Statutes of uncertain date =

English laws whose dates of passage are not known

The statutes of uncertain date, also known as statuta incerti temporis or Certain Statutes made during the Reigns of K. Henry 3. K. Edward 1. or K. Edward 2. but uncertain when or in which of their times, are English statutes dating from the reigns of Henry III, Edward I or Edward II, and frequently listed in the statute books at the end of the reign of Edward II.

== Statutes of uncertain date ==
Certain statutes do not include within their text the date on which they were made, or are otherwise considered to be of ambiguous or uncertain date (temp. incert.). These statutes are known to date generally from the reigns of Henry III, Edward I, or Edward II, and are therefore printed in The Statutes of the Realm immediately after those for Edward II.

=== Henry III ===
- Les Estatuz del Eschekere (Statutes of the Exchequer) — cited as 51 Hen. 3 Sts. 4 & 5 in The Statutes at Large; repealed (except chapter 12) for England and Wales by Statute Law Revision Act 1863 (26 & 27 Vict. c. 125) and for Ireland by Statute Law (Ireland) Revision Act 1872 (35 & 36 Vict. c. 98), for England and Wales by Statute Law Revision and Civil Procedure Act 1881 (44 & 45 Vict. c. 59) and for England and Wales and Northern Ireland by Statute Law (Repeals) Act 2013 (c. 2)
- Districciones de Scaccario (Of Distresses taken for the King's Debt) — cited as 51 Hen. 3 Stat. 4 in The Statutes at Large;
  still in force
- Assisa Panis et Cervisie (The Assize of Bread and Ale) or Assize of Bread and Ale Act 1266 Concerning the Price of Bread and Ale. — cited as 51 Hen. 3 Stat. 1 in The Statutes at Large; repealed for England and Wales by Statute Law Revision Act 1863 (26 & 27 Vict. c. 125) and for Ireland by Statute Law (Ireland) Revision Act 1872 (35 & 36 Vict. c. 98)
- Judicium Pillorie (The Judgement of the Pillory) — cited as The Statute of the Pillory and Tumbrel, and of the Assise of Bread and Ale (51 Hen. 3 Stat. 6) in The Statutes at Large; repealed by Forestalling, Regrating, etc. Act 1844 (7 & 8 Vict. c. 24)
- Dies Communes de Banco (General Days in Bank) — cited as 51 Hen. 3 Stat. 2 in The Statutes at Large; repealed for England and Wales by Statute Law Revision Act 1863 (26 & 27 Vict. c. 125) and for Ireland by Statute Law (Ireland) Revision Act 1872 (35 & 36 Vict. c. 98)
- Dies Communes de Dote (General Days in Dower) or General Days in Dower Act 1266 — cited as 51 Hen. 3 Stat. 3 in The Statutes at Large; repealed for England and Wales by Statute Law Revision Act 1863 (26 & 27 Vict. c. 125) and for Ireland by Statute Law (Ireland) Revision Act 1872 (35 & 36 Vict. c. 98)
- Pro quibus hominibus de Com' Kanc' (For What People from the County of Kent) Rot. Claus. 16 Hen. III m. 14 — printed in The Statutes of the Realm, not included in the Chronological Table of the Statutes or The Statutes at Large
- Gavilkindeis de Kanc' (Gavelkind of Kent) Rot. Claus. 17 Hen. III m. 17 — printed in The Statutes of the Realm, not included in the Chronological Table of the Statutes or The Statutes at Large

=== Edward I ===
- Statutum de Pistoribus, etc. (Statute concerning Bakers, etc.) — cited as An Ordinance for Bakers, Brewers, and for other Victuallers; and for Ells, Bushels, and Forestallers in The Statutes at Large; repealed by Statute Law Revision Act 1948 (11 & 12 Geo. 6. c. 62)
- Weights and Measures Act 1303 or Assisa de Ponderibz et Mensuris (Assize of Weights and Measures) — cited as 31 Edw. 1 in The Statutes at Large; repealed for England and Wales by Statute Law Revision Act 1863 (26 & 27 Vict. c. 125) and for Ireland by Statute Law (Ireland) Revision Act 1872 (35 & 36 Vict. c. 98)
- De Divisione Denariorum (Currency of halfpence and farthings) — repealed for England and Wales by Statute Law Revision Act 1863 (26 & 27 Vict. c. 125) and for Ireland by Statute Law (Ireland) Revision Act 1872 (35 & 36 Vict. c. 98)
- Statutum de Admensuratione Terre (Statute for the Measuring of Land) — cited as 33 Edw. 1 Stat. 6 in The Statutes at Large; repealed for England and Wales by Statute Law Revision Act 1863 (26 & 27 Vict. c. 125) and for Ireland by Statute Law (Ireland) Revision Act 1872 (35 & 36 Vict. c. 98)
- Compositio Ulnarum et Perticarum (Composition of Yards and Perches) or the Statute of Ells and Perches — repealed for England and Wales by Statute Law Revision Act 1863 (26 & 27 Vict. c. 125) and for Ireland by Statute Law (Ireland) Revision Act 1872 (35 & 36 Vict. c. 98)
- Prohibitio formata de Statuto Articuli Cleri (A Prohibition made upon the Articles of the Clergy) — repealed for England and Wales by Statute Law Revision Act 1863 (26 & 27 Vict. c. 125) and for Ireland by Statute Law (Ireland) Revision Act 1872 (35 & 36 Vict. c. 98)
- Les Estatuz de Excestre (Statutes of Exeter) — cited as Statutum Exon. (14 Edw. 1) and Art. Statutum Exon. (14 Edw. 1) in The Statutes at Large; repealed for England and Wales by Statute Law Revision Act 1863 (26 & 27 Vict. c. 125) and for Ireland by Statute Law (Ireland) Revision Act 1872 (35 & 36 Vict. c. 98)
- Statutum super Vicecomitem et Clerlcos suos (Statute concerning the Sheriff and his Clerks) — not printed in The Statutes at Large; repealed for England and Wales by Statute Law Revision Act 1863 (26 & 27 Vict. c. 125) and for Ireland by Statute Law (Ireland) Revision Act 1872 (35 & 36 Vict. c. 98)
- Modu Levandi Fines (The Manner of levying of Fines) — cited as Modus Levandi Fines (18 Edw. 1. Stat. 4) in The Statutes at Large; repealed for England and Wales by Statute Law Revision Act 1863 (26 & 27 Vict. c. 125) and for Ireland by Statute Law (Ireland) Revision Act 1872 (35 & 36 Vict. c. 98)
- Statutum de Finibus et Attornatis (Statute concerning Fines and Attorneys) or Levying of Fines, Attorneys Act 1322 — cited as 15 Edw. 2 in The Statutes at Large; repealed for England and Wales by Statute Law Revision Act 1863 (26 & 27 Vict. c. 125) and for Ireland by Statute Law (Ireland) Revision Act 1872 (35 & 36 Vict. c. 98)
- Statutum de Conspiratoribus (Statute concerning Conspirators) or the Champerty Act 1305 — cited as Statute of Champerty (33 Edw. 1. Stat. 3) in The Statutes at Large; repealed by Criminal Law Act 1967 (c. 58)
- Statutü de Protectionibus non allocandis (Statute against allowing Protections) — cited as 33 Edw. 1. Stat. 1 in The Statutes at Large; repealed for England and Wales by Statute Law Revision Act 1863 (26 & 27 Vict. c. 125) and for Ireland by Statute Law (Ireland) Revision Act 1872 (35 & 36 Vict. c. 98)
- Statutum de Visu Terre, et Essonio de servitio domino Regis (Statute for View of Land, and Essoin in the King's Service) — repealed for England and Wales by Statute Law Revision Act 1863 (26 & 27 Vict. c. 125) and for Ireland by Statute Law (Ireland) Revision Act 1872 (35 & 36 Vict. c. 98)
- Statutum de Magnis Assisis et Duellis (Statute concerning the Great Assizes and Battle) — repealed for England and Wales by Statute Law Revision Act 1863 (26 & 27 Vict. c. 125) and for Ireland by Statute Law (Ireland) Revision Act 1872 (35 & 36 Vict. c. 98)
- Statutum de Moneta (Statute Concerning Money) — cited as Statutum de Moneta (20 Edw. 1. Stat. 4) and Articuli de Moneta (20 Edw. 1. Stat. 6) in The Statutes at Large; repealed by Coinage Offences Act 1832 (2 & 3 Will. 4. c. 34)
- Statutum de Moneta parvum (Small Statute Concerning Money) — cited as 20 Edw. 1. Stat. 5 in The Statutes at Large; repealed by Coinage Offences Act 1832 (2 & 3 Will. 4. c. 34)
- Statutum de Tenentibus per legem Anglie (Statute concerning Tenants by the Curtesy of England) — repealed by Administration of Estates Act 1925 (15 & 16 Geo. 5. c. 23)
- Ne Rector prosternat Arbores in Cemiterio (That the Rector do not cut down Trees in the Church-Yard) — cited as 35 Edw. 1. Stat. 2 in The Statutes at Large; repealed by Statute Law Revision Act 1958 (6 & 7 Eliz. 2. c. 46)

=== Edward II ===
- Modus calumpniandi Esson' (The Manner of challenging Essoins) — cited as 12 Edw. 2. Stat. 2 in The Statutes at Large; repealed for England and Wales by Statute Law Revision Act 1863 (26 & 27 Vict. c. 125) and for Ireland by Statute Law (Ireland) Revision Act 1872 (35 & 36 Vict. c. 98)
- Les Estatuz de la Jeuerie (Statutes of the Jews) — cited as Statutum de Judeismo (temp. incert.) in The Statutes at Large; repealed by Religious Disabilities Act 1846 (9 & 10 Vict. c. 59)
- Statutum de Gaveleto in London (Statute of Gavelet in London) (Recovery of rents) — cited as 10 Edw. 2 in The Statutes at Large; repealed for England and Wales by Statute Law Revision Act 1863 (26 & 27 Vict. c. 125) and for Ireland by Statute Law (Ireland) Revision Act 1872 (35 & 36 Vict. c. 98)
- Consuetudines Cantiae (The Customs of Kent) — not printed in The Statutes at Large; repealed by Statute Law Revision Act 1948 (11 & 12 Geo. 6. c. 62)
- Prerogativa Regis (Of the King's Prerogative) — cited as 17 Edw. 2. Stat. 1 in The Statutes at Large
  - Wardship of Heir of the King's Tenant in Chief c. 1 — repealed for England and Wales by Statute Law Revision Act 1863 (26 & 27 Vict. c. 125) and for Ireland by Statute Law (Ireland) Revision Act 1872 (35 & 36 Vict. c. 98)
  - Wardship of Heir of the King's Tenant c. 2 — repealed for England and Wales by Statute Law Revision Act 1863 (26 & 27 Vict. c. 125) and for Ireland by Statute Law (Ireland) Revision Act 1872 (35 & 36 Vict. c. 98)
  - Premier Seisin of Land of the King's Tenant c. 3 — repealed for England and Wales by Statute Law Revision Act 1863 (26 & 27 Vict. c. 125) and for Ireland by Statute Law (Ireland) Revision Act 1872 (35 & 36 Vict. c. 98)
  - Assignment of Dower to Widows of King's Tenants Of their Marriage c. 4 — repealed for England and Wales by Statute Law Revision Act 1863 (26 & 27 Vict. c. 125) and for Ireland by Statute Law (Ireland) Revision Act 1872 (35 & 36 Vict. c. 98)
  - Marriage of Heiresses c. 5 — repealed for England and Wales by Statute Law Revision Act 1863 (26 & 27 Vict. c. 125) and for Ireland by Statute Law (Ireland) Revision Act 1872 (35 & 36 Vict. c. 98)
  - Homage for Lands, holden of the King, descending to Coparceners c. 6 — repealed for England and Wales by Statute Law Revision Act 1863 (26 & 27 Vict. c. 125) and for Ireland by Statute Law (Ireland) Revision Act 1872 (35 & 36 Vict. c. 98)
  - Wardship of Women married under Age c. 7 — repealed for England and Wales by Statute Law Revision Act 1863 (26 & 27 Vict. c. 125) and for Ireland by Statute Law (Ireland) Revision Act 1872 (35 & 36 Vict. c. 98)
  - Alienation of Lands holden in Chief c. 8 — repealed for England and Wales by Statute Law Revision Act 1863 (26 & 27 Vict. c. 125) and for Ireland by Statute Law (Ireland) Revision Act 1872 (35 & 36 Vict. c. 98)
  - Alienation of Serjeanties c. 9 (Ruffhead: c. 7) — repealed for England and Wales by Statute Law Revision Act 1863 (26 & 27 Vict. c. 125) and for Ireland by Statute Law (Ireland) Revision Act 1872 (35 & 36 Vict. c. 98)
  - (Benefice) c. 10 (Ruffhead: c. 8) — repealed by Statute Law (Repeals) Act 1969 (c. 52)
  - (Lunatic) c. 11 (Ruffhead: c. 9) — repealed for England and Wales by Mental Health Act 1959 (7 & 8 Eliz. 2. c. 72)
  - Lands of Lunaticks Act 1324 c. 12 (Ruffhead: c. 10) — repealed for England and Wales by Mental Health Act 1959 (7 & 8 Eliz. 2. c. 72)
  - Wreck of the sea c. 13 (Ruffhead: c. 11) —
    still in force
  - Escheat of Lands descending to Aliens c. 14 (Ruffhead: c. 12) — repealed for England and Wales by Statute Law Revision Act 1863 (26 & 27 Vict. c. 125) and for Ireland by Statute Law (Ireland) Revision Act 1872 (35 & 36 Vict. c. 98)
  - Intrusion of the King's Tenant before Homage c. 15 (Ruffhead: c. 13) — repealed for England and Wales by Statute Law Revision Act 1863 (26 & 27 Vict. c. 125) and for Ireland by Statute Law (Ireland) Revision Act 1872 (35 & 36 Vict. c. 98)
  - Escheats of felons during the vacancy of bishopricks c. 16 (Ruffhead: c. 14) — repealed by Statute Law Revision Act 1948 (11 & 12 Geo. 6. c. 62)
  - (Crown grants) c. 17 (Ruffhead: c. 15) —
    still in force
  - Crown Forfeitures Act 1324 The lands and goods of felons attainted c. 18 (Ruffhead: c. 16) — repealed by Statute Law Revision Act 1948 (11 & 12 Geo. 6. c. 62)
- Modus faciendi Homagium et Fidelitatem (The Manner of doing Homage and Fealty) — cited as 17 Edw. 2. Stat. 2 in The Statutes at Large; repealed by Statute Law Revision Act 1887 (50 & 51 Vict. c. 59)
- Statutum de Wardis et Releviis (Statute concerning Wards and Reliefs) — cited as 28 Edw. 1. Stat. 1 in The Statutes at Large; repealed by Civil Procedure Acts Repeal Act 1879 (42 & 43 Vict. c. 59)
- Respiting of Knighthood Act 1307 Statutum de respectu Milit' habendo (Statute for respiting of Knighthood) — cited as Statutum de Militibus (1 Edw. 2. Stat. 1) in The Statutes at Large; repealed for England and Wales by Statute Law Revision Act 1863 (26 & 27 Vict. c. 125) and for Ireland by Statute Law (Ireland) Revision Act 1872 (35 & 36 Vict. c. 98)
- De Catallis Felonum (Of the Chattels of Felons) — repealed by Statute Law Revision Act 1948 (11 & 12 Geo. 6. c. 62)
- Statuta Armorum (The Statutes of Arms) — repealed for England and Wales by Statute Law Revision Act 1863 (26 & 27 Vict. c. 125) and for Ireland by Statute Law (Ireland) Revision Act 1872 (35 & 36 Vict. c. 98)
- Statutum de Sacramento Ministrorum Regis (Statute for Oaths of the King's Officers in the Eyre) — cited as Articuli et Sacramenta Ministrorum Regis in itinere Justiciariorum in The Statutes at Large; repealed for England and Wales by Statute Law Revision Act 1863 (26 & 27 Vict. c. 125) and for Ireland by Statute Law (Ireland) Revision Act 1872 (35 & 36 Vict. c. 98)
- Capitula Itineris (The Articles of the Eyre) — not printed in The Statutes at Large; repealed for England and Wales by Statute Law Revision Act 1863 (26 & 27 Vict. c. 125) and for Ireland by Statute Law (Ireland) Revision Act 1872 (35 & 36 Vict. c. 98)
- Capitula Escaetrie (Articles of the Office of Escheator) — not printed in The Statutes at Large; repealed for England and Wales by Statute Law Revision Act 1863 (26 & 27 Vict. c. 125) and for Ireland by Statute Law (Ireland) Revision Act 1872 (35 & 36 Vict. c. 98)
- Extenta Manerii (For Extending or Surveying a Manor) Expressing a Survey of the Buildings, Lands, Commons, Parks, Woods, Tenants, &c. — cited as 4 Edw. 1. Stat. 1 in The Statutes at Large; repealed for England and Wales by Statute Law Revision Act 1863 (26 & 27 Vict. c. 125) and for Ireland by Statute Law (Ireland) Revision Act 1872 (35 & 36 Vict. c. 98)
- Consuetudines et Assisa de Foresta (The Customs and Assise of the Forest) — cited as Consuetudines et Assisa de Foresta five Articuli de Attachiamentis Foreste in The Statutes at Large; repealed by Wild Creatures and Forest Laws Act 1971 (c. 47)
- Articuli Inquisic' super Statutum Wyntoniensi (Articles of Inquiry upon the Statute of Winchester) — cited as 34 Edw. 1. Stat. 2 in The Statutes at Large; repealed for England and Wales by Statute Law Revision Act 1863 (26 & 27 Vict. c. 125) and for Ireland by Statute Law (Ireland) Revision Act 1872 (35 & 36 Vict. c. 98)
- Visus Franciplegii (The View of Frankpledge) — cited as 18 Edw. 2 in The Statutes at Large; repealed by Sheriffs Act 1887 (50 & 51 Vict. c. 55)
- Oath of the Sheriff Act 1306 Le Serement du Visconte (The Oath of the Sheriff) — cited as 34 Edw. 1 in The Statutes at Large; repealed for England and Wales by Statute Law Revision Act 1863 (26 & 27 Vict. c. 125) and for Ireland by Statute Law (Ireland) Revision Act 1872 (35 & 36 Vict. c. 98)
- Forma Juramenti illorum de Concillio Regis (Form of the Oath of those of the King's Council) — not printed in The Statutes at Large; repealed for England and Wales by Statute Law Revision Act 1863 (26 & 27 Vict. c. 125) and for Ireland by Statute Law (Ireland) Revision Act 1872 (35 & 36 Vict. c. 98)
- Juramentum Episcoporum (The Oath of the Bishops) — not printed in The Statutes at Large; repealed for England and Wales by Statute Law Revision Act 1863 (26 & 27 Vict. c. 125) and for Ireland by Statute Law (Ireland) Revision Act 1872 (35 & 36 Vict. c. 98)
- Juramentum Escaetorum (The Oath of Escheators) — not printed in The Statutes at Large; repealed for England and Wales by Statute Law Revision Act 1863 (26 & 27 Vict. c. 125) and for Ireland by Statute Law (Ireland) Revision Act 1872 (35 & 36 Vict. c. 98)
- Juramentum Majorum et Ballivorum (The Oath of Mayor and Bailiffs) — not printed in The Statutes at Large; repealed by Statute Law Revision Act 1887 (50 & 51 Vict. c. 59)
- Abjuratio et Juramentum Latronum (The Abjuration and Oath of Thieves) — not printed in The Statutes at Large; repealed for England and Wales by Statute Law Revision Act 1863 (26 & 27 Vict. c. 125) and for Ireland by Statute Law (Ireland) Revision Act 1872 (35 & 36 Vict. c. 98)

=== Temp. incert. in The Statutes at Large ===
These statutes were listed as of uncertain date in The Statutes at Large, but were assigned to dates by the research of the Record Commission in compiling The Statutes of the Realm.

- Statutum quod vocatur de Ragman de Justitiariis assignatis — cited in The Statutes of the Realm as Statutum de Justic̃ assigñ quod vocatur Rageman (4 Edw. 1) — repealed for England and Wales by Statute Law Revision Act 1863 (26 & 27 Vict. c. 125) and for Ireland by Statute Law (Ireland) Revision Act 1872 (35 & 36 Vict. c. 98)
- Statutum de Justiciariis Assignatis — cited in The Statutes of the Realm as Statutum de Justiciariis Assignatis (21 Edw. 1) — repealed by Statute Law Revision Act 1953 (2 & 3 Eliz. 2. c. 5)
- Statutum de brevi de inquisitionibus concedendo de terris ad manum mortuam ponendis — cited in The Statutes of the Realm as De brevi de Inquisicione concedena de terris ad manum mortuam ponend (20 Edw. 1) — repealed for England and Wales by Statute Law Revision Act 1863 (26 & 27 Vict. c. 125) and for Ireland by Statute Law (Ireland) Revision Act 1872 (35 & 36 Vict. c. 98)

=== Sources ===
- "Statutes of Uncertain Date". The Statutes of the Realm. Vol. 1. pp. 197–250 – via HathiTrust.
- "Temporibus Hen. III, Edw. que I & II". The Statutes at Large. Vol. 1 – Magna Charta to 14 Edward III – 1225 to 1340. 16 April 1762. pp. 389–406 – via Internet Archive.
- "Temporibus Hen. III, Edw. que I & II". The Statutes at Large. Vol. 1 – Magna Charta to 14 Edward III – 1225 to 1340. Cambridge, Printed by J. Bentham. 16 April 1762. pp. 389–406 – via Internet Archive.
- "Anno quinquagesimo primo Henrici III". The Statutes at Large. Vol. 1 – Magna Charta to 14 Edward III – 1225 to 1340. 16 April 1762. pp. 34–50 – via Internet Archive.
- "Anno quinquagesimo primo Henrici III". The Statutes at Large. Vol. 1 – Magna Charta to 14 Edward III – 1225 to 1340. Cambridge, Printed by J. Bentham. 16 April 1762. pp. 34–50 – via Internet Archive.
- "Anno quarto Edwardi I". The Statutes at Large. Vol. 1 – Magna Charta to 14 Edward III – 1225 to 1340. 16 April 1762. pp. 107–110 – via Internet Archive.
- "Anno quarto Edwardi I". The Statutes at Large. Vol. 1 – Magna Charta to 14 Edward III – 1225 to 1340. Cambridge, Printed by J. Bentham. 16 April 1762. pp. 107–110 – via Internet Archive.
- "Anno decimo quarto Edwardi I". The Statutes at Large. Vol. 1 – Magna Charta to 14 Edward III – 1225 to 1340. 16 April 1762. pp. 248–251 – via Internet Archive.
- "Anno decimo quarto Edwardi I". The Statutes at Large. Vol. 1 – Magna Charta to 14 Edward III – 1225 to 1340. Cambridge, Printed by J. Bentham. 16 April 1762. pp. 248–251 – via Internet Archive.
- "Anno decimo octavo Edwardi I". The Statutes at Large. Vol. 1 – Magna Charta to 14 Edward III – 1225 to 1340. 16 April 1762. pp. 259–261 – via Internet Archive.
- "Anno decimo octavo Edwardi I". The Statutes at Large. Vol. 1 – Magna Charta to 14 Edward III – 1225 to 1340. Cambridge, Printed by J. Bentham. 16 April 1762. pp. 259–261 – via Internet Archive.
- "Anno vicesimo Edwardi I". The Statutes at Large. Vol. 1 – Magna Charta to 14 Edward III – 1225 to 1340. 16 April 1762. pp. 266–269 – via Internet Archive.
- "Anno vicesimo Edwardi I". The Statutes at Large. Vol. 1 – Magna Charta to 14 Edward III – 1225 to 1340. Cambridge, Printed by J. Bentham. 16 April 1762. pp. 266–269 – via Internet Archive.
- "Anno vicesimo octavo Edwardi I". The Statutes at Large. Vol. 1 – Magna Charta to 14 Edward III – 1225 to 1340. 16 April 1762. p. 287 – via Internet Archive.
- "Anno vicesimo octavo Edwardi I". The Statutes at Large. Vol. 1 – Magna Charta to 14 Edward III – 1225 to 1340. Cambridge, Printed by J. Bentham. 16 April 1762. p. 287 – via Internet Archive.
- "Anno tricesimo primo Edwardi I". The Statutes at Large. Vol. 1 – Magna Charta to 14 Edward III – 1225 to 1340. 16 April 1762. pp. 305–306 – via Internet Archive.
- "Anno tricesimo primo Edwardi I". The Statutes at Large. Vol. 1 – Magna Charta to 14 Edward III – 1225 to 1340. Cambridge, Printed by J. Bentham. 16 April 1762. pp. 305–306 – via Internet Archive.
- "Anno tricesimo tertio Edwardi I". The Statutes at Large. Vol. 1 – Magna Charta to 14 Edward III – 1225 to 1340. 16 April 1762. pp. 307–309, 312–313 – via Internet Archive.
- "Anno tricesimo tertio Edwardi I". The Statutes at Large. Vol. 1 – Magna Charta to 14 Edward III – 1225 to 1340. Cambridge, Printed by J. Bentham. 16 April 1762. pp. 307–309, 312–313 – via Internet Archive.
- "Anno tricesimo quarto Edwardi I". The Statutes at Large. Vol. 1 – Magna Charta to 14 Edward III – 1225 to 1340. 16 April 1762. pp. 313–318, 326 – via Internet Archive.
- "Anno tricesimo quarto Edwardi I". The Statutes at Large. Vol. 1 – Magna Charta to 14 Edward III – 1225 to 1340. Cambridge, Printed by J. Bentham. 16 April 1762. pp. 313–318, 326 – via Internet Archive.
- "Anno tricesimo quinto Edwardi I". The Statutes at Large. Vol. 1 – Magna Charta to 14 Edward III – 1225 to 1340. 16 April 1762. pp. 332–333 – via Internet Archive.
- "Anno tricesimo quinto Edwardi I". The Statutes at Large. Vol. 1 – Magna Charta to 14 Edward III – 1225 to 1340. Cambridge, Printed by J. Bentham. 16 April 1762. pp. 332–333 – via Internet Archive.
- "Anno primo Edwardi II". The Statutes at Large. Vol. 1 – Magna Charta to 14 Edward III – 1225 to 1340. 16 April 1762. pp. 333–334 – via Internet Archive.
- "Anno primo Edwardi II". The Statutes at Large. Vol. 1 – Magna Charta to 14 Edward III – 1225 to 1340. Cambridge, Printed by J. Bentham. 16 April 1762. pp. 333–334 – via Internet Archive.
- "Anno decimo Edwardi II". The Statutes at Large. Vol. 1 – Magna Charta to 14 Edward III – 1225 to 1340. 16 April 1762. pp. 350–351 – via Internet Archive.
- "Anno decimo Edwardi II". The Statutes at Large. Vol. 1 – Magna Charta to 14 Edward III – 1225 to 1340. Cambridge, Printed by J. Bentham. 16 April 1762. pp. 350–351 – via Internet Archive.
- "Anno duodecimo Edwardi II". The Statutes at Large. Vol. 1 – Magna Charta to 14 Edward III – 1225 to 1340. 16 April 1762. pp. 357–359 – via Internet Archive.
- "Anno duodecimo Edwardi II". The Statutes at Large. Vol. 1 – Magna Charta to 14 Edward III – 1225 to 1340. Cambridge, Printed by J. Bentham. 16 April 1762. pp. 357–359 – via Internet Archive.
- "Anno decimo quinto Edwardi II". The Statutes at Large. Vol. 1 – Magna Charta to 14 Edward III – 1225 to 1340. 16 April 1762. pp. 360–362 – via Internet Archive.
- "Anno decimo quinto Edwardi II". The Statutes at Large. Vol. 1 – Magna Charta to 14 Edward III – 1225 to 1340. Cambridge, Printed by J. Bentham. 16 April 1762. pp. 360–362 – via Internet Archive.
- "Anno decimo septimo Edwardi II". The Statutes at Large. Vol. 1 – Magna Charta to 14 Edward III – 1225 to 1340. 16 April 1762. pp. 376–385 – via Internet Archive.
- "Anno decimo septimo Edwardi II". The Statutes at Large. Vol. 1 – Magna Charta to 14 Edward III – 1225 to 1340. Cambridge, Printed by J. Bentham. 16 April 1762. pp. 376–385 – via Internet Archive.
- "Anno decimo octavo Edwardi II". The Statutes at Large. Vol. 1 – Magna Charta to 14 Edward III – 1225 to 1340. 16 April 1762. pp. 387–389 – via Internet Archive.
- "Anno decimo octavo Edwardi II". The Statutes at Large. Vol. 1 – Magna Charta to 14 Edward III – 1225 to 1340. Cambridge, Printed by J. Bentham. 16 April 1762. pp. 387–389 – via Internet Archive.
- Chronological Table of and Index to the Statutes. Vol. 1: To the End of the Session 59 Vict. Sess. 2 (1895) (13th ed.). London: Her Majesty's Stationery Office. 1896. pp. 20–22 – via Google Books.
- Chronological Table of the Statutes: Covering the Period from 1235 to the End of 1971. London: Her Majesty's Stationery Office. 1972. pp. 16–18. ISBN 978-0-11-840096-1 – via Google Books.
- "Acts of the English Parliament from 1322". legislation.gov.uk. The National Archives.

== See also ==
- List of acts of the Parliament of England
- Weights and Measures Acts (UK)
