= Statute merchant =

Act of the Parliament of England

Statutum de Mercatoribus
- Act of Parliament
- Parliament of England
- Long title: None
- Citation: 11 Edw. 1
- Territorial extent: England and Wales; Ireland

Dates
- Royal assent: 1283
- Commencement: 1283
- Repealed: England and Wales: 28 July 1863; Ireland: 10 August 1872

Other legislation
- Repealed by: England and Wales: Statute Law Revision Act 1863; Ireland: Statute Law (Ireland) Revision Act 1872
- Relates to: Recovery of Debts by Statute Merchant Act 1285

Status: Repealed

Text of statute as originally enacted

Recovery of Debts by Statute Merchant Act 1285
- Act of Parliament
- Parliament of England
- Long title: Statutum Mercatorum
- Citation: 13 Edw. 1
- Territorial extent: England and Wales; Ireland

Dates
- Royal assent: 1285
- Commencement: 1285
- Repealed: England and Wales: 28 July 1863; Ireland: 10 August 1872

Other legislation
- Repealed by: England and Wales: Statute Law Revision Act 1863; Ireland: Statute Law (Ireland) Revision Act 1872

Status: Repealed

Text of statute as originally enacted

Statute merchant (Latin: Statutum mercatorum) and statute staple are two old forms of security, long obsolete in English practice, though references to them still occur in some modern statutes.

The former security was first created by the Statute of Merchants 1283 (11 Edw. 1), or Statute of Acton Burnell (named after Acton Burnell in Shropshire, the place where Parliament met and passed the statute) and amplified by the Statute of Merchants 1285 (13 Edw. 1), whence its name, and the latter by an act of 1353, which provided that in every staple (i.e. public mart) the seal of the staple should be sufficient validity for a bond of record acknowledged and witnessed before the mayor of the staple. They were originally permitted only among traders, for the benefit of commerce, but afterwards extended by an act of Henry VIII (1532) to all subjects, whether traders or not. The creditor under either form of security was allowed to seize the goods and hold the lands of a defaulting debtor until satisfaction of his debt. While he held the lands he was termed tenant by statute merchant or by statute staple. In addition to the loss of his goods and lands the debtor was liable to be imprisoned. Statute merchant, owing to the summary method of enforcing payment, was sometimes known as pocket judgment.

An example of a suit of statute merchant can be seen in the Plea Rolls of the Court of Common Pleas, in 1430, where John Salter, citizen and tanner of York, John Wyot, vicar of St Nicholas, Mikelgate, John Yoman, (the latter two as executors of Henry Ravenswath) are parties.

== Subsequent developments ==
The act was extended to Ireland by Poynings' Law 1495 (10 Hen. 7. c. 22 (I)).

The whole act was repealed for England and Wales by section 1 of, and the schedule to, the Statute Law Revision Act 1863 (26 & 27 Vict. c. 125), which came into force on 28 July 1863.

The whole act was repealed for Ireland by section 1 of, and the schedule to, the Statute Law (Ireland) Revision Act 1872 (35 & 36 Vict. c. 98), which came into force on 10 August 1872.
