= List of acts of the Parliament of England, 1275–1307 =

This is a list of acts of the Parliament of England for the years 1275 until 1307.

For acts passed during the period 1707–1800, see the list of acts of the Parliament of Great Britain. See also the list of acts of the Parliament of Scotland and the list of acts of the Parliament of Ireland.

For acts passed from 1801 onwards, see the list of acts of the Parliament of the United Kingdom. For acts of the devolved parliaments and assemblies in the United Kingdom, see the list of acts of the Scottish Parliament, the list of acts of the Northern Ireland Assembly, and the list of acts and measures of Senedd Cymru; see also the list of acts of the Parliament of Northern Ireland.

For medieval statutes, etc. that are not considered to be acts of Parliament, see the list of English statutes.

The number shown after each act's title is its chapter number. Acts are cited using this number, preceded by the year(s) of the reign during which the relevant parliamentary session was held; thus the Union with Ireland Act 1800 is cited as "39 & 40 Geo. 3. c. 67", meaning the 67th act passed during the session that started in the 39th year of the reign of George III and which finished in the 40th year of that reign. Note that the modern convention is to use Arabic numerals in citations (thus "41 Geo. 3" rather than "41 Geo. III"). Acts of the last session of the Parliament of Great Britain and the first session of the Parliament of the United Kingdom are both cited as "41 Geo. 3".

Acts passed by the Parliament of England did not have a short title; however, some of these acts have subsequently been given a short title by acts of the Parliament of the United Kingdom (such as the Short Titles Act 1896).

Acts passed by the Parliament of England were deemed to have come into effect on the first day of the session in which they were passed. Because of this, the years given in the list below may in fact be the year before a particular act was passed.

== 1275 (3 Edw. 1) ==
This session was also traditionally cited as 3 Ed. 1 or 3 E. 1.

Les permers Estatuz de Westmuster (Statute of Westminster the First) also Statutum Westm. prim.

- Peace of the Church and the Realm Act 1275 c. 1 The Peace of the Church and the Realm shall be maintained. Religious Houses shall not be overcharged. — repealed for England and Wales by Statute Law Revision Act 1863 (26 & 27 Vict. c. 125) and for Ireland by Statute Law (Ireland) Revision Act 1872 (35 & 36 Vict. c. 98)
- (Benefit of clergy) c. 2 A Clerk convict of Felony, delivered to the Ordinary, shall not depart without Purgation. — repealed for England and Wales by Criminal Statutes Repeal Act 1827 (7 & 8 Geo. 4. c. 27), for Ireland by Criminal Statutes (Ireland) Repeal Act 1828 (9 Geo. 4. c. 53) and for India by Criminal Law (India) Act 1828 (9 Geo. 4. c. 74)
- (Escapes) c. 3 No Penalty for an Escape before it be adjudged. — repealed for England and Wales by Statute Law Revision Act 1863 (26 & 27 Vict. c. 125) and for Ireland by Statute Law (Ireland) Revision Act 1872 (35 & 36 Vict. c. 98)
- Wreck Act 1275 c. 4 What shall be adjuged Wreck of the Sea, and what not. — repealed for England and Wales by Statute Law Revision Act 1863 (26 & 27 Vict. c. 125) and for Ireland by Statute Law (Ireland) Revision Act 1872 (35 & 36 Vict. c. 98)
- Freedom of Election Act 1275 c. 5 There shall be no Disturbance of Free Elections. —
  still in force
- (Amercements) c. 6 Amerciaments shall be reasonable, and according to the Offence. — repealed by Criminal Law Act 1967 (c. 58)
- (Purveyance) c. 7 In what manner, and of whom, Purveyance shall be made for a Castle. — repealed for England and Wales by Statute Law Revision Act 1863 (26 & 27 Vict. c. 125) and for Ireland by Statute Law (Ireland) Revision Act 1872 (35 & 36 Vict. c. 98)
- (Beaupleader) c. 8 Nothing shall be taken for Beaupleader. — repealed for England and Wales by Statute Law Revision Act 1863 (26 & 27 Vict. c. 125) and for Ireland by Statute Law (Ireland) Revision Act 1872 (35 & 36 Vict. c. 98)
- (Pursuit of felons) c. 9 All Men shall be ready to pursue Felons. — repealed by Sheriffs Act 1887 (50 & 51 Vict. c. 55) and Coroners Act 1887 (50 & 51 Vict. c. 71)
- (Coroners) c. 10 What sort of Men shall be Coroners. Sheriffs shall have Counter-Rolls with them. — repealed by Coroners Act 1887 (50 & 51 Vict. c. 71)
- (Inquests of murder) c. 11 Replevin by the Writ of Odio & Atia. Who shall be Triers of Murther. — repealed for England and Wales by Offences Against the Person Act 1828 (9 Geo. 4. c. 31), for Ireland by Offences Against the Person (Ireland) Act 1829 (10 Geo. 4. c. 34) and for India by Criminal Law (India) Act 1828 (9 Geo. 4. c. 74)
- (Standing mute) c. 12 The Punishment of Felons refusing lawful Trial. — repealed for England and Wales by Statute Law Revision Act 1863 (26 & 27 Vict. c. 125) and for Ireland by Statute Law (Ireland) Revision Act 1872 (35 & 36 Vict. c. 98)
- (Rape) c. 13 The Punishment of him that doth ravish a Woman. — repealed for England and Wales by Offences Against the Person Act 1828 (9 Geo. 4. c. 31), for Ireland by Offences Against the Person (Ireland) Act 1829 (10 Geo. 4. c. 34) and for India by Criminal Law (India) Act 1828 (9 Geo. 4. c. 74)
- (Principal and accessory) c. 14 Appeal against the Principal and Accessary. — repealed for England and Wales by Statute Law Revision Act 1863 (26 & 27 Vict. c. 125) and for Ireland by Statute Law (Ireland) Revision Act 1872 (35 & 36 Vict. c. 98)
- Prisoners and Bail Act 1275 c. 15 Which Prisoners be mainpernable, and which not. The Penalty for unlawful Bailment. — repealed for England and Wales by Criminal Law Act 1826 (7 Geo. 4. c. 64), for Ireland by Criminal Statutes (Ireland) Repeal Act 1828 (9 Geo. 4. c. 53) and for England and Wales and Ireland by Sheriffs Act 1887 (50 & 51 Vict. c. 55)
- Distress Act 1275 c. 16 None shall distrain out of his Fee, nor drive the Distress out of the County. — repealed by Statute Law (Repeals) Act 1969 (c. 52)
- (Distress) c. 17 The Remedy if the Distress be impounded in a Castle or Fortress. — repealed for England and Wales by Statute Law Revision Act 1863 (26 & 27 Vict. c. 125) and for Ireland by Statute Law (Ireland) Revision Act 1872 (35 & 36 Vict. c. 98)
- (Fines on the county) c. 18 Who shall assess the common Fines of the County. — repealed for England and Wales by Statute Law Revision Act 1863 (26 & 27 Vict. c. 125) and for Ireland by Statute Law (Ireland) Revision Act 1872 (35 & 36 Vict. c. 98)
- Crown Debts Act 1275 c. 19 A Sheriff having received the King's Debt, shall discharge the Debtor. — repealed by Statute Law Revision and Civil Procedure Act 1881 (44 & 45 Vict. c. 59)
- (Trespassers in parks and ponds) c. 20 Offences committed in Parks and Ponds. Robbing of tame Beasts in a Park. — repealed for England and Wales by Criminal Statutes Repeal Act 1827 (7 & 8 Geo. 4. c. 27), for Ireland by Criminal Statutes (Ireland) Repeal Act 1828 (9 Geo. 4. c. 53) and for India by Criminal Law (India) Act 1828 (9 Geo. 4. c. 74)
- (Lands in ward) c. 21 No Waste shall be made in Wards Lands; nor in Bishops, during the Vacation. — repealed by Civil Procedure Acts Repeal Act 1879 (42 & 43 Vict. c. 59)
- (Wardship) c. 22 The Penalty of an Heir marryingh without Consent of his Guardian. A Woman Ward. — repealed for England and Wales by Statute Law Revision Act 1863 (26 & 27 Vict. c. 125) and for Ireland by Statute Law (Ireland) Revision Act 1872 (35 & 36 Vict. c. 98)
- (Distress for debt against strangers) c. 23 None shall be distrained for a Debt that he oweth not. — repealed for England and Wales by Statute Law Revision Act 1863 (26 & 27 Vict. c. 125) and for Ireland by Statute Law (Ireland) Revision Act 1872 (35 & 36 Vict. c. 98)
- (Unlawful disseisin by escheators, etc.) c. 24 The Remedy if an Officer of the King do disseise any. — repealed by Civil Procedure Acts Repeal Act 1879 (42 & 43 Vict. c. 59)
- (Champerty) c. 25 None shall commit Champerty, to have Part of the Thing in Question. — repealed by Criminal Law Act 1967 (c. 58)
- (Extortion by officers of the Crown) c. 26 None of the King's Officers shall commit Extortion. — repealed by Theft Act 1968 (c. 60)
- (Extortion) c. 27 Clerks or Officers shall not commit Extortion. — repealed for England and Wales by Statute Law Revision Act 1863 (26 & 27 Vict. c. 125) and for Ireland by Statute Law (Ireland) Revision Act 1872 (35 & 36 Vict. c. 98)
- (Maintenance) c. 28 Clerks shall not commit Maintenance. — repealed by Criminal Law Act 1967 (c. 58)
- (Fraud) c. 29 The Penalty of a Serjeant or Pleader committing Deceit. — repealed by Statute Law Revision Act 1948 (11 & 12 Geo. 6. c. 62)
- (Extortion) c. 30 Extortion by Justices Officers. — repealed for England and Wales by Statute Law Revision Act 1863 (26 & 27 Vict. c. 125) and for Ireland by Statute Law (Ireland) Revision Act 1872 (35 & 36 Vict. c. 98)
- (Tolls in markets and murage) c. 31 The Penalty of taking excessive Toll in a City, &c. Murage granted to Cities. — repealed by Theft Act 1968 (c. 60)
- (Purveyance, Crown debts) c. 32 The Penalty of Purveyors not paying for what they take. The King's Carriages. — repealed for England and Wales by Statute Law Revision Act 1863 (26 & 27 Vict. c. 125) and for Ireland by Statute Law (Ireland) Revision Act 1872 (35 & 36 Vict. c. 98)
- (Barretors) c. 33 No Maintainers of Quarrels shall be suffered. — repealed for England and Wales by Statute Law Revision Act 1863 (26 & 27 Vict. c. 125) and for Ireland by Statute Law (Ireland) Revision Act 1872 (35 & 36 Vict. c. 98)
- (Slanderous reports) c. 34 None shall report slandrous News, whereby Discord may arise. — repealed by Statute Law Revision Act 1887 (50 & 51 Vict. c. 59)
- (Excess of jurisdiction in franchises) c. 35 The Penalty for arresting within a Liberty those that hold not thereof. — repealed by Civil Procedure Acts Repeal Act 1879 (42 & 43 Vict. c. 59)
- (Aids for knighthood, etc.) c. 36 Aid to make the Son Knight, or to marry the Daughter. — repealed for England and Wales by Statute Law Revision Act 1863 (26 & 27 Vict. c. 125) and for Ireland by Statute Law (Ireland) Revision Act 1872 (35 & 36 Vict. c. 98)
- (Dissseisin with robbery, etc.) c. 37 The Penalty of a Main attainted of Disseisen with Robbery in the King's Time. — repealed for England and Wales by Statute Law Revision Act 1863 (26 & 27 Vict. c. 125) and for Ireland by Statute Law (Ireland) Revision Act 1872 (35 & 36 Vict. c. 98)
- (Attaints in real actions) c. 38 An Attaint shall be granted in Plea of Land touching Freehold. — repealed for England and Wales by Statute Law Revision Act 1863 (26 & 27 Vict. c. 125) and for Ireland by Statute Law (Ireland) Revision Act 1872 (35 & 36 Vict. c. 98)
- (Limitation of prescription) c. 39 Several Limitations of Prescription in Several Writs. — repealed for England and Wales by Statute Law Revision Act 1863 (26 & 27 Vict. c. 125) and for Ireland by Statute Law (Ireland) Revision Act 1872 (35 & 36 Vict. c. 98)
- (Voucher to warranty) c. 40 Voucher to Warranty, and Counter-pleading of Voucher. — repealed for England and Wales by Statute Law Revision Act 1863 (26 & 27 Vict. c. 125) and for Ireland by Statute Law (Ireland) Revision Act 1872 (35 & 36 Vict. c. 98)
- (Writ of right) c. 41 The Champion's Oath in a Writ of Right. — repealed for England and Wales by Statute Law Revision Act 1863 (26 & 27 Vict. c. 125) and for Ireland by Statute Law (Ireland) Revision Act 1872 (35 & 36 Vict. c. 98)
- (Essoins) c. 42 Certain Actions, wherein after Appearance the Tenant shall not be essoined. — repealed for England and Wales by Statute Law Revision Act 1863 (26 & 27 Vict. c. 125) and for Ireland by Statute Law (Ireland) Revision Act 1872 (35 & 36 Vict. c. 98)
- (Essoins) c. 43 There shall be no more Foucher by Essoin. — repealed for England and Wales by Statute Law Revision Act 1863 (26 & 27 Vict. c. 125) and for Ireland by Statute Law (Ireland) Revision Act 1872 (35 & 36 Vict. c. 98)
- (Essoins) c. 44 In what Case Essoin ultra mare shall not be allowed. — repealed for England and Wales by Statute Law Revision Act 1863 (26 & 27 Vict. c. 125) and for Ireland by Statute Law (Ireland) Revision Act 1872 (35 & 36 Vict. c. 98)
- (Process) c. 45 In what Cases the great Distress shall be awarded. Where the Justices Estreats shall be delivered. — repealed for England and Wales by Statute Law Revision Act 1863 (26 & 27 Vict. c. 125) and for Ireland by Statute Law (Ireland) Revision Act 1872 (35 & 36 Vict. c. 98)
- (Order of hearing pleas) c. 46 One Plea shall be decided by the Justices before another commenced. — repealed for England and Wales by Statute Law Revision Act 1863 (26 & 27 Vict. c. 125) and for Ireland by Statute Law (Ireland) Revision Act 1872 (35 & 36 Vict. c. 98)
- Real Actions Act 1275 c. 47 In what Case the Nonage of the Heir of the Dissesor or Disseisee shall not prejudice. — repealed for England and Wales by Statute Law Revision Act 1863 (26 & 27 Vict. c. 125) and for Ireland by Statute Law (Ireland) Revision Act 1872 (35 & 36 Vict. c. 98)
- Land in Ward Act 1275 c. 48 The Remedy where a Guardian maketh a Feoffment of his Ward's Lane. Suit by Prochein Amy. — repealed for England and Wales by Statute Law Revision Act 1863 (26 & 27 Vict. c. 125) and for Ireland by Statute Law (Ireland) Revision Act 1872 (35 & 36 Vict. c. 98)
- (Plea in dower) c. 49 The Tenant's Plea in a Writ of Dower. — repealed for England and Wales by Statute Law Revision Act 1863 (26 & 27 Vict. c. 125) and for Ireland by Statute Law (Ireland) Revision Act 1872 (35 & 36 Vict. c. 98)
- Saving for the Crown Act 1275 c. 50 A Saving to the King of the Rights of his Crown. —
  still in force
- (Times of taking certain assizes) c. 51 Assises and Darrein Presentments at what Time taken. — repealed for England and Wales by Statute Law Revision Act 1863 (26 & 27 Vict. c. 125) and for Ireland by Statute Law (Ireland) Revision Act 1872 (35 & 36 Vict. c. 98)

Chapters 25 and 28 combined are referred to as the Maintenance and Champerty Act 1275 in the Republic of Ireland.

De Statutis Legendis et proclamandis Rot. Pat. 3. E. 1. m. 10 — listed in The Statutes of the Realm, not listed in The Chronological Table of the Statutes.

=== Sources ===
- "3° Edw. I". The Statutes of the Realm. Vol. 1. pp. 26–39 – via HathiTrust.
- "Anno tertio Edwardi I". The Statutes at Large. Vol. 1 – Magna Charta to 14 Edward III – 1225 to 1340. 16 April 1762. pp. 74–107 – via Internet Archive.
- "Anno tertio Edwardi I". The Statutes at Large. Vol. 1 – Magna Charta to 14 Edward III – 1225 to 1340. Cambridge, Printed by J. Bentham. 16 April 1762. pp. 74–107 – via Internet Archive.
- Chronological Table of and Index to the Statutes. Vol. 1: To the End of the Session 59 Vict. Sess. 2 (1895) (13th ed.). London: Her Majesty's Stationery Office. 1896. pp. 12–13 – via Google Books.
- Chronological Table of the Statutes: Covering the Period from 1235 to the End of 1971. London: Her Majesty's Stationery Office. 1972. pp. 10–11. ISBN 978-0-11-840096-1 – via Google Books.
- "Acts of the English Parliament from 1275". legislation.gov.uk. The National Archives.

== 1276 (4 Edw. 1) ==
This session was also traditionally cited as 4 Ed. 1 or 4 E. 1.

For Extenta Manerii, cited as 4 Edw. 1. Stat. 1 in The Statutes at Large, see Statutes of uncertain date.

For Statutum Exon. and Art. Statutum Exon. see Les Estatuz de Excestre under Statutes of uncertain date.

Officium Coronatoris (Office of the Coroner) Of what things a Coroner shall inquire. — cited as De Officio Coronatoris (4 Edw. 1. Stat. 2) in The Statutes at Large; repealed by Coroners Act 1887 (50 & 51 Vict. c. 71)

Statutum de Bigamis (Statute of Bigamy) — cited as 4 Edw. 1. Stat. 3 in The Statutes at Large

- c. 1 In what Cases Aid shall be granted of the King, in what not. — repealed for England and Wales by Statute Law Revision Act 1863 (26 & 27 Vict. c. 125) and for Ireland by Statute Law (Ireland) Revision Act 1872 (35 & 36 Vict. c. 98)
- c. 2 In what Case Aid is granted of the King, in what not. — repealed for England and Wales by Statute Law Revision Act 1863 (26 & 27 Vict. c. 125) and for Ireland by Statute Law (Ireland) Revision Act 1872 (35 & 36 Vict. c. 98)
- c. 3 In Dower the King's Grantee of a Ward shall not have aid. — repealed for England and Wales by Statute Law Revision Act 1863 (26 & 27 Vict. c. 125) and for Ireland by Statute Law (Ireland) Revision Act 1872 (35 & 36 Vict. c. 98)
- c. 4 Purprestures or Usurpations upon the King's Land shall be resised. — repealed for England and Wales by Statute Law Revision Act 1863 (26 & 27 Vict. c. 125) and for Ireland by Statute Law (Ireland) Revision Act 1872 (35 & 36 Vict. c. 98)
- c. 5 Bigamus shall not be allowed his Clergy. — repealed for England and Wales by Offences Against the Person Act 1828 (9 Geo. 4. c. 31), for Ireland by Offences Against the Person (Ireland) Act 1829 (10 Geo. 4. c. 34) and for India by Criminal Law (India) Act 1828 (9 Geo. 4. c. 74)
- c. 6 By what Words in a Feoffment a Feoffor shall be bound to Warranty. — repealed for England and Wales by Statute Law Revision Act 1863 (26 & 27 Vict. c. 125) and for Ireland by Statute Law (Ireland) Revision Act 1872 (35 & 36 Vict. c. 98)

Statutum de Justic̃ assigñ quod vocatur Rageman (A Statute concerning Justices being assigned, called Rageman) or Justices of Oyer and Terminer Act 1276 — cited as Statutum quod vocatur de Ragman de Justitiariis assignatis of uncertain date (temp incert.) in The Statutes at Large— repealed for England and Wales by Statute Law Revision Act 1863 (26 & 27 Vict. c. 125) and for Ireland by Statute Law (Ireland) Revision Act 1872 (35 & 36 Vict. c. 98)

=== Sources ===
- "4° Edw. I". The Statutes of the Realm. Vol. 1. pp. 40–44 – via HathiTrust.
- "Anno quarto Edwardi I". The Statutes at Large. Vol. 1 – Magna Charta to 14 Edward III – 1225 to 1340. 16 April 1762. pp. 110–117 – via Internet Archive.
- "Anno quarto Edwardi I". The Statutes at Large. Vol. 1 – Magna Charta to 14 Edward III – 1225 to 1340. Cambridge, Printed by J. Bentham. 16 April 1762. pp. 110–117 – via Internet Archive.
- "Temporibus Hen. III, Edw. que I & II". The Statutes at Large. Vol. 1 – Magna Charta to 14 Edward III – 1225 to 1340. 16 April 1762. pp. 394–395 – via Internet Archive.
- "Temporibus Hen. III, Edw. que I & II". The Statutes at Large. Vol. 1 – Magna Charta to 14 Edward III – 1225 to 1340. Cambridge, Printed by J. Bentham. 16 April 1762. pp. 394–395 – via Internet Archive.
- Chronological Table of and Index to the Statutes. Vol. 1: To the End of the Session 59 Vict. Sess. 2 (1895) (13th ed.). London: Her Majesty's Stationery Office. 1896. p. 13 – via Google Books.
- Chronological Table of the Statutes: Covering the Period from 1235 to the End of 1971. London: Her Majesty's Stationery Office. 1972. p. 11. ISBN 978-0-11-840096-1 – via Google Books.

== 1278 (6 Edw. 1) ==
A Parliament of King Edward I which met at Gloucester from 8 July 1278.

This session was also traditionally cited as 6 Ed. 1 or 6 E. 1.

- Statuta Gloucestr' (Statutes of Gloucester)
  - (Franchise) (part preceding c. 1) (Note: From Cum prelatz.) — repealed by Civil Procedure Acts Repeal Act 1879 (42 & 43 Vict. c. 59)
  - for England and Wales by Statute Law Revision Act 1863 (26 & 27 Vict. c. 125) and for Ireland by Statute Law (Ireland) Revision Act 1872 (35 & 36 Vict. c. 98)
  - Franchise Act 1278 or Recovery of Damages and Costs Act 1278 c. 1 Several Actions wherein Damages shall be recovered. — repealed by Civil Procedure Acts Repeal Act 1879 (42 & 43 Vict. c. 59) and for England and Wales by Statute Law Revision and Civil Procedure Act 1883 (46 & 47 Vict. c. 49) and for Northern Ireland by Statute Law Revision Act 1950 (14 Geo. 6. c. 6)
  - (Real actions) c. 2 In what Case Nonage of the Plaintiff shall not stay an Enquest. — repealed for England and Wales by Statute Law Revision Act 1863 (26 & 27 Vict. c. 125) and for Ireland by Statute Law (Ireland) Revision Act 1872 (35 & 36 Vict. c. 98)
  - (Real actions) c. 3 An Alienation of Land by the Tenant by the Curtesy with Warranty shall be void. — repealed for England and Wales by Statute Law Revision Act 1863 (26 & 27 Vict. c. 125) and for Ireland by Statute Law (Ireland) Revision Act 1872 (35 & 36 Vict. c. 98)
  - (Real actions) c. 4 In what Case Ceffavit is maintainable against a Tenant in Fee-farm. — repealed for England and Wales by Statute Law Revision Act 1863 (26 & 27 Vict. c. 125) and for Ireland by Statute Law (Ireland) Revision Act 1872 (35 & 36 Vict. c. 98)
  - (Actions of waste) c. 5 Several Tenants against whom an Action of Waste is maintainable. — repealed by Civil Procedure Acts Repeal Act 1879 (42 & 43 Vict. c. 59)
  - (Real actions) c. 6 Where divers Heirs shall have one Assise of Mortdauncestor. — repealed for England and Wales by Statute Law Revision Act 1863 (26 & 27 Vict. c. 125) and for Ireland by Statute Law (Ireland) Revision Act 1872 (35 & 36 Vict. c. 98)
  - (Real actions) c. 7 A Writ of Entry in casu proviso, upon a Woman's Alienation of Dower. — repealed for England and Wales by Statute Law Revision Act 1863 (26 & 27 Vict. c. 125) and for Ireland by Statute Law (Ireland) Revision Act 1872 (35 & 36 Vict. c. 98)
  - Actions Act 1278 c. 8 No Suit for Goods in the King's Courts under Forty Shillings. Attorneys may be made where an Appeal lieth not. The Defendant being essoined shall bring in his Warrant. — repealed by Civil Procedure Acts Repeal Act 1879 (42 & 43 Vict. c. 59)
  - (Homicide) c. 9 One Person killing another in his own Defence, or by Misfortune. An Appeal of Murther. — repealed for England and Wales by Statute Law Revision Act 1863 (26 & 27 Vict. c. 125) and for Ireland by Statute Law (Ireland) Revision Act 1872 (35 & 36 Vict. c. 98)
  - (Essoins) c. 10 The Husband and Wife being impleaded, shall not fourch by Essoin. — repealed for England and Wales by Statute Law Revision Act 1863 (26 & 27 Vict. c. 125) and for Ireland by Statute Law (Ireland) Revision Act 1872 (35 & 36 Vict. c. 98)
  - (Real actions, etc.) c. 11 A feigned Recovery against him in the Reversion, to make the Termor lose his Term. — repealed for England and Wales by Statute Law Revision Act 1863 (26 & 27 Vict. c. 125) and for Ireland by Statute Law (Ireland) Revision Act 1872 (35 & 36 Vict. c. 98)
  - (Real actions, etc.) c. 12 One impleaded in London voucheth Foreign Warranty. — repealed for England and Wales by Statute Law Revision Act 1863 (26 & 27 Vict. c. 125) and for Ireland by Statute Law (Ireland) Revision Act 1872 (35 & 36 Vict. c. 98)
  - (Real actions, etc.) c. 13 No Waste shall be made handing a Suit for the Land. — repealed for England and Wales by Statute Law Revision Act 1863 (26 & 27 Vict. c. 125) and for Ireland by Statute Law (Ireland) Revision Act 1872 (35 & 36 Vict. c. 98)
  - (Real actions, etc.) c. 14 A Citizen of London shall recover in an Assise Damages with the Land. — repealed for England and Wales by Statute Law Revision Act 1863 (26 & 27 Vict. c. 125) and for Ireland by Statute Law (Ireland) Revision Act 1872 (35 & 36 Vict. c. 98)
  - (Breach of assize in London) c. 15 Inquiry shall be made in London of Wines sold against the Assise. — repealed for England and Wales by Statute Law Revision Act 1863 (26 & 27 Vict. c. 125) and for Ireland by Statute Law (Ireland) Revision Act 1872 (35 & 36 Vict. c. 98)
- Explanaciones Stat. Gloucestr' (Exposition of the Statute of Gloucester) (Damages, real actions, etc.) — repealed for England and Wales by Statute Law Revision Act 1863 (26 & 27 Vict. c. 125) and for Ireland by Statute Law (Ireland) Revision Act 1872 (35 & 36 Vict. c. 98)

=== Sources ===
- "6° Edw. I". The Statutes of the Realm. Vol. 1. pp. 45–50 – via HathiTrust.
- "Anno sexto Edwardi I". The Statutes at Large. Vol. 1 – Magna Charta to 14 Edward III – 1225 to 1340. 16 April 1762. pp. 117–132 – via Internet Archive.
- "Anno sexto Edwardi I". The Statutes at Large. Vol. 1 – Magna Charta to 14 Edward III – 1225 to 1340. Cambridge, Printed by J. Bentham. 16 April 1762. pp. 117–132 – via Internet Archive.
- Chronological Table of and Index to the Statutes. Vol. 1: To the End of the Session 59 Vict. Sess. 2 (1895) (13th ed.). London: Her Majesty's Stationery Office. 1896. pp. 13–14 – via Google Books.
- Chronological Table of the Statutes: Covering the Period from 1235 to the End of 1971. London: Her Majesty's Stationery Office. 1972. p. 11. ISBN 978-0-11-840096-1 – via Google Books.

== 1279 (7 Edw. 1) ==
This session was also traditionally cited as 7 Ed. 1 or 7 E. 1.

For the Coming Armed to Parliament Act 1313, cited as 7 Edw. 1 Stat. 1 in The Statutes at Large, see 7 Edw. 2.

- Statutum de Viris Religiosis (Statute for Religious Men) or the Mortmain Act 1279 Who shall take the Forfeiture of Lands given in Mortmain. — cited as A Statute of Mortmain (7 Edw. 1 Stat. 2) in The Statutes at Large; repealed by Mortmain and Charitable Uses Act 1888 (51 & 52 Vict. c. 42)

=== Sources ===
- "7° Edw. I". The Statutes of the Realm. Vol. 1. p. 51 – via HathiTrust.
- "Anno septimo Edwardi I". The Statutes at Large. Vol. 1 – Magna Charta to 14 Edward III – 1225 to 1340. 16 April 1762. pp. 133–135 – via Internet Archive.
- "Anno septimo Edwardi I". The Statutes at Large. Vol. 1 – Magna Charta to 14 Edward III – 1225 to 1340. Cambridge, Printed by J. Bentham. 16 April 1762. pp. 133–135 – via Internet Archive.
- Chronological Table of and Index to the Statutes. Vol. 1: To the End of the Session 59 Vict. Sess. 2 (1895) (13th ed.). London: Her Majesty's Stationery Office. 1896. p. 14 – via Google Books.
- Chronological Table of the Statutes: Covering the Period from 1235 to the End of 1971. London: Her Majesty's Stationery Office. 1972. p. 11. ISBN 978-0-11-840096-1 – via Google Books.

== 1281 (9 Edw. 1) ==
This session was also traditionally cited as 9 Ed. 1 or 9 E. 1.

- Articulus Statuti Glouc̃ (An Article of the Statute of Gloucester) (Voucher to warranty in London) A Correction of the Twelfth Chapter of the Statute of Gloucester, touching calling Foreigners to Warranty in London. — repealed for England and Wales by Statute Law Revision Act 1863 (26 & 27 Vict. c. 125) and for Ireland by Statute Law (Ireland) Revision Act 1872 (35 & 36 Vict. c. 98)

=== Sources ===
- "7° Edw. I". The Statutes of the Realm. Vol. 1. p. 52 – via HathiTrust.
- "Anno nono Edwardi I". The Statutes at Large. Vol. 1 – Magna Charta to 14 Edward III – 1225 to 1340. 16 April 1762. pp. 135–136 – via Internet Archive.
- "Anno nono Edwardi I". The Statutes at Large. Vol. 1 – Magna Charta to 14 Edward III – 1225 to 1340. Cambridge, Printed by J. Bentham. 16 April 1762. pp. 135–136 – via Internet Archive.
- Chronological Table of and Index to the Statutes. Vol. 1: To the End of the Session 59 Vict. Sess. 2 (1895) (13th ed.). London: Her Majesty's Stationery Office. 1896. p. 14 – via Google Books.
- Chronological Table of the Statutes: Covering the Period from 1235 to the End of 1971. London: Her Majesty's Stationery Office. 1972. p. 11. ISBN 978-0-11-840096-1 – via Google Books.

== 1282 (10 Edw. 1) ==
For the Statute of Rutland, cited as 10 Edw. 1 in The Statutes at Large, see 12 Edw. 1.

This session was also traditionally cited as 10 Ed. 1 or 10 E. 1.

== 1283 (11 Edw. 1) ==
This session was also traditionally cited as 11 Ed. 1 or 11 E. 1.

- Statutum de Mercatoribus (Statute of Merchants) or the Statute of Acton Burnell. Ordaining the Statute-Merchant for Recovery of Debts — repealed for England and Wales by Statute Law Revision Act 1863 (26 & 27 Vict. c. 125) and for Ireland by Statute Law (Ireland) Revision Act 1872 (35 & 36 Vict. c. 98)

=== Sources ===
- "11° Edw. I". The Statutes of the Realm. Vol. 1. pp. 53–54 – via HathiTrust.
- "Anno undecimo Edwardi I". The Statutes at Large. Vol. 1 – Magna Charta to 14 Edward III – 1225 to 1340. 16 April 1762. pp. 141–144 – via Internet Archive.
- "Anno undecimo Edwardi I". The Statutes at Large. Vol. 1 – Magna Charta to 14 Edward III – 1225 to 1340. Cambridge, Printed by J. Bentham. 16 April 1762. pp. 141–144 – via Internet Archive.
- Chronological Table of and Index to the Statutes. Vol. 1: To the End of the Session 59 Vict. Sess. 2 (1895) (13th ed.). London: Her Majesty's Stationery Office. 1896. p. 14 – via Google Books.
- Chronological Table of the Statutes: Covering the Period from 1235 to the End of 1971. London: Her Majesty's Stationery Office. 1972. p. 11. ISBN 978-0-11-840096-1 – via Google Books.

== 1284 (12 Edw. 1) ==
This session was also traditionally cited as 10 Ed. 1, 12 Ed. 1 or 12 E. 1.

Statuta Wallie (Statutes of Wales), or the Statute of Rhuddlan, or the Wales Act 1284 — repealed by Statute Law Revision Act 1887 (50 & 51 Vict. c. 59)

Provisiones facete in Scaccario (Provisions made in the Exchequer) A New Statute of the Exchequer called the Statute of Rutland. Touching the Recovery of the King's Debts. — cited as Statutum Rothlan (Statute of Rutland) in the Chronological Table of the Statutes; cited as 10 Edw. 1 in The Statutes at Large; not to be confused with the Statute of Rhuddlan; repealed for England and Wales by Sheriffs Act 1887 (50 & 51 Vict. c. 55) and for Northern Ireland by Statute Law Revision Act 1950 (14 Geo. 6. c. 6)

=== Sources ===
- "12° Edw. I". The Statutes of the Realm. Vol. 1. pp. 55–70 – via HathiTrust.
- "Anno duodecimo Edwardi I". The Statutes at Large. Vol. 1 – Magna Charta to 14 Edward III – 1225 to 1340. 16 April 1762. pp. 144–162 – via Internet Archive.
- "Anno duodecimo Edwardi I". The Statutes at Large. Vol. 1 – Magna Charta to 14 Edward III – 1225 to 1340. Cambridge, Printed by J. Bentham. 16 April 1762. pp. 144–162 – via Internet Archive.
- "Anno decimo Edwardi I". The Statutes at Large. Vol. 1 – Magna Charta to 14 Edward III – 1225 to 1340. 16 April 1762. pp. 136–141 – via Internet Archive.
- "Anno decimo Edwardi I". The Statutes at Large. Vol. 1 – Magna Charta to 14 Edward III – 1225 to 1340. Cambridge, Printed by J. Bentham. 16 April 1762. pp. 136–141 – via Internet Archive.
- Chronological Table of and Index to the Statutes. Vol. 1: To the End of the Session 59 Vict. Sess. 2 (1895) (13th ed.). London: Her Majesty's Stationery Office. 1896. p. 14 – via Google Books.
- Chronological Table of the Statutes: Covering the Period from 1235 to the End of 1971. London: Her Majesty's Stationery Office. 1972. p. 11. ISBN 978-0-11-840096-1 – via Google Books.

== 1285 (13 Edw. 1) ==
This session was also traditionally cited as 13 Ed. 1 or 13 E. 1.

Statuta Regis Edwardi edita apud Westmon̄, in Parliamento suo Pascha Anno Regni sui Tercio decimo (Statutes of King Edward made at Westminster, in his Parliament at Easter, in the Thirteenth Year of his Reign) — cited as Statute of Westminster the Second (Statutum Westm. sec.) 13 Edw. 1. St. 1 in The Statutes at Large

- Estates Tail Act 1285 or Statute De Donis Conditionalibus 1285 or De donis conditionalibus c. 1 In Gifts in Tail the Donor's Will shall be observed. The Form of a Formedon. —
  still in force
- Replevin Act 1285 c. 2 A Recordare to remove a Plaint. Pledges to prosecute a Suit. Second Deliverance. — repealed for England and Wales by Statute Law Revision and Civil Procedure Act 1881 (44 & 45 Vict. c. 59) and for Northern Ireland by Statute Law Revision Act 1950 (14 Geo. 6. c. 6)
- (Real actions) c. 3 A Cui in vita for the Wife. Where a Wife, or he in Reversion, shall be received. — repealed for England and Wales by Statute Law Revision Act 1863 (26 & 27 Vict. c. 125) and for Ireland by Statute Law (Ireland) Revision Act 1872 (35 & 36 Vict. c. 98)
- (Real actions) c. 4 Where the Wife shall be endowable of Lands recovered against her Husband. Where the Heir may avoid a Dower recovered. A remedy for particular Tenants losing by default. — repealed for England and Wales by Statute Law Revision Act 1863 (26 & 27 Vict. c. 125) and for Ireland by Statute Law (Ireland) Revision Act 1872 (35 & 36 Vict. c. 98)
- Recovery of Advowsons Act 1285 c. 5 Remedies to redress Usurpations of Advowsons of Churches, &c. — repealed for Northern Ireland by Statute Law Revision Act 1950 (14 Geo. 6. c. 6) and for England and Wales by Statute Law (Repeals) Act 1969 (c. 52)
- (Real actions) c. 6 The Penalty if a Tenant impleaded voucheth, and the Vouchee denieth his Warranty. — repealed for England and Wales by Statute Law Revision Act 1863 (26 & 27 Vict. c. 125) and for Ireland by Statute Law (Ireland) Revision Act 1872 (35 & 36 Vict. c. 98)
- (Real actions) c. 7 Admeasurement of Dower for the Guardian and the Heir, and the Process therein. — repealed for England and Wales by Statute Law Revision Act 1863 (26 & 27 Vict. c. 125) and for Ireland by Statute Law (Ireland) Revision Act 1872 (35 & 36 Vict. c. 98)
- (Real actions) c. 8 In what Case a Secunda superoneratione Pasturæ shall be awarded. — repealed for England and Wales by Statute Law Revision Act 1863 (26 & 27 Vict. c. 125) and for Ireland by Statute Law (Ireland) Revision Act 1872 (35 & 36 Vict. c. 98)
- (Real actions) c. 9 In what Case the Writ of Mesne is to be pursued. — repealed for England and Wales by Statute Law Revision Act 1863 (26 & 27 Vict. c. 125) and for Ireland by Statute Law (Ireland) Revision Act 1872 (35 & 36 Vict. c. 98)
- Suits Before Justices in Eyre Act 1285 c. 10 At what Time Writs shall be delivered for Suits depending before Justices in Eyre. Any Person may make a general Attorney. — repealed by Civil Procedure Acts Repeal Act 1879 (42 & 43 Vict. c. 59)
- Accountants Act 1285 c. 11 The Masters Remedy against their Servants, and other Accomptants. — repealed by Bankruptcy Repeal and Insolvent Court Act 1869 (32 & 33 Vict. c. 83) and Statute Law (Ireland) Revision Act 1872 (35 & 36 Vict. c. 98)
- (Appeal of felony) c. 12 The Appellant being acquitted, the Appellor and Abettors shall be punished. There shall be no Essoin for the Appellor. — repealed for England and Wales by Statute Law Revision Act 1863 (26 & 27 Vict. c. 125) and for Ireland by Statute Law (Ireland) Revision Act 1872 (35 & 36 Vict. c. 98)
- (Sheriff's tourn, etc.) c. 13 The Order of the Indictments taken in the Sheriffs Turn. — repealed by Sheriffs Act 1887 (50 & 51 Vict. c. 55)
- (Actions of waste) c. 14 The Process in an Action of Waste. A Writ to enquire of Waste. — repealed by Civil Procedure Acts Repeal Act 1879 (42 & 43 Vict. c. 59)
- Infants (Next Friend) Act 1285 c. 15 An Enfant eloined may sue by Prochein Amy. — repealed for England and Wales by Statute Law Revision and Civil Procedure Act 1881 (44 & 45 Vict. c. 59) and for Northern Ireland by Statute Law Revision (Northern Ireland) Act 1973 (c. 50)
- Wardship Act 1285 c. 16 Priority of Feoffment giveth Title of Wardship. — repealed for England and Wales by Statute Law Revision Act 1863 (26 & 27 Vict. c. 125) and for Ireland by Statute Law (Ireland) Revision Act 1872 (35 & 36 Vict. c. 98)
- (Essoin) c. 17 In what Case Essoin De malo lecti doth lie, and where not. — repealed for England and Wales by Statute Law Revision Act 1863 (26 & 27 Vict. c. 125) and for Ireland by Statute Law (Ireland) Revision Act 1872 (35 & 36 Vict. c. 98)
- Execution of Damages Act 1285 c. 18 He that recovereth Debt may sue Execution by Fieri facias or Elegit. — repealed by Bankruptcy Act 1883 (46 & 47 Vict. c. 52) and Statute Law Revision Act 1948 (11 & 12 Geo. 6. c. 62)
- Administration of Estates Act 1285 c. 19 The Ordinary chargeable to pay Debts as Executors. — repealed by Administration of Estates Act 1925 (15 & 16 Geo. 5. c. 23)
- (Real actions) c. 20 The Tenants Answer in a Writ of Cosinage, Aiel, and Besaiel. — repealed for England and Wales by Statute Law Revision Act 1863 (26 & 27 Vict. c. 125) and for Ireland by Statute Law (Ireland) Revision Act 1872 (35 & 36 Vict. c. 98)
- (Real actions) c. 21 A Cessavit by the chief Lord against his Freehold Tenant. — repealed for England and Wales by Statute Law Revision Act 1863 (26 & 27 Vict. c. 125) and for Ireland by Statute Law (Ireland) Revision Act 1872 (35 & 36 Vict. c. 98)
- (Actions of waste) c. 22 Waste maintainable by one Tenant in common against another. — repealed by Civil Procedure Acts Repeal Act 1879 (42 & 43 Vict. c. 59)
- (Executors; writ of accompt) c. 23 Executors may have a Writ of Accompt. — repealed by Administration of Estates Act 1925 (15 & 16 Geo. 5. c. 23)
- (Real actions) c. 24 A Writ of Nuisance of a House, &c. levied and aliened to another. A Quod permittat and Juris utrum for a Parson of a Church. In like Cases like Writs be grantable. — repealed for England and Wales by Statute Law Revision Act 1863 (26 & 27 Vict. c. 125) and for Ireland by Statute Law (Ireland) Revision Act 1872 (35 & 36 Vict. c. 98)
- (Real actions) c. 25 Of what Things an Assise shall lie. Certificate of Assise. Attachment in an Assise. — repealed for England and Wales by Statute Law Revision Act 1863 (26 & 27 Vict. c. 125) and for Ireland by Statute Law (Ireland) Revision Act 1872 (35 & 36 Vict. c. 98)
- (Real actions) c. 26 Who may bring a Writ of Redisseisin, and the Punishment of the Offender therein. — repealed for England and Wales by Statute Law Revision Act 1863 (26 & 27 Vict. c. 125) and for Ireland by Statute Law (Ireland) Revision Act 1872 (35 & 36 Vict. c. 98)
- (Essoins) c. 27 Essoin after inquest, but none after Day given Prece partium. — repealed for England and Wales by Statute Law Revision Act 1863 (26 & 27 Vict. c. 125) and for Ireland by Statute Law (Ireland) Revision Act 1872 (35 & 36 Vict. c. 98)
- (Real actions) c. 28 In certain Actions, after Appearance there shall be no Essoin. — repealed for England and Wales by Statute Law Revision Act 1863 (26 & 27 Vict. c. 125) and for Ireland by Statute Law (Ireland) Revision Act 1872 (35 & 36 Vict. c. 98)
- (Writs of trespass, etc.) c. 29 To whom only the Writ of Trespass of Oyer and Terminer shall be granted. In what Case the Writ of Odio & Atia is granted. — repealed by Civil Procedure Acts Repeal Act 1879 (42 & 43 Vict. c. 59)
- (Justices of nisi prius, etc.) c. 30 — The Authority of Justices of Nisi prius. Adjournment of Suits. Certain Writs that be determinable in their proper Counties. A Jury may give their Verdict at large. None but which were summoned shall be put in Assises or Juries. — repealed for England and Wales by Statute Law Revision and Civil Procedure Act 1881 (44 & 45 Vict. c. 59) and for Scotland and Northern Ireland by Statute Law Revision Act 1950 (14 Geo. 6. c. 6)
- (Bills of exceptions) c. 31 An Exception to a Plea shall be sealed by the Justices. — repealed for England and Wales by Statute Law Revision and Civil Procedure Act 1881 (44 & 45 Vict. c. 59) and for Scotland and Northern Ireland by Statute Law Revision Act 1950 (14 Geo. 6. c. 6)
- (Mortmain) c. 32 Mortmain by Recovery of Land by Default. — repealed by Mortmain and Charitable Uses Act 1888 (51 & 52 Vict. c. 42)
- (Forfeiture of lands) c. 33 Lands where Crosses be set, shall be forfeited as Lands aliened in Mortmain. — repealed by Repeal of Obsolete Statutes Act 1856 (19 & 20 Vict. c. 64)
- Forfeiture of Dower, etc. Act 1285 or Dower Act 1285 c. 34 It is Felony to commit Rape. A married Woman elopeth with Advouterer. The Penalty for carrying a Nun from her House. — repealed for England and Wales by Offences Against the Person Act 1828 (9 Geo. 4. c. 31), for India by Criminal Law (India) Act 1828 (9 Geo. 4. c. 74), for Ireland by Offences Against the Person (Ireland) Act 1829 (10 Geo. 4. c. 34), for England and Wales by Administration of Estates Act 1925 (15 & 16 Geo. 5. c. 23), for England and Wales and Scotland by Statute Law Revision Act 1948 (11 & 12 Geo. 6. c. 62) and for Northern Ireland by Property (Northern Ireland) Order 1978 (SI 1978/459)
- (Punishment of him that taketh away a ward) c. 35 In what Cases do lie a Writ of Ravishment of Ward, Communi Custodia, Ejectione, &c. — repealed for England and Wales by Statute Law Revision and Civil Procedure Act 1881 (44 & 45 Vict. c. 59) and for Scotland and Northern Ireland by Statute Law Revision Act 1948 (11 & 12 Geo. 6. c. 62)
- Procurement of Suits Act 1285 c. 36 A Distress taken upon a Suit commenced by others. — repealed by Civil Procedure Acts Repeal Act 1879 (42 & 43 Vict. c. 59)
- Distress Act 1285 c. 37 No Distress shall be taken but by Baliffs known and sworn. — repealed by Statute Law (Repeals) Act 1969 (c. 52)
- (Juries) c. 38 How many shall be returned in Juries and petit Assises, and what Age they shall be. — repealed for England and Wales by Statute Law Revision Act 1863 (26 & 27 Vict. c. 125) and for Ireland by Statute Law (Ireland) Revision Act 1872 (35 & 36 Vict. c. 98)
- Execution of Process Act 1285 c. 39 The Manner to deliver Writs to the Sheriff to be executed. The Sheriff returneth a Liberty where none is. Returning of Issues. Resistance of Execution of Process. — repealed by Sheriffs Act 1887 (50 & 51 Vict. c. 55)
- (Real actions) c. 40 A Woman's Suit shall not be deferred by the Minority of the Heir. — repealed for England and Wales by Statute Law Revision Act 1863 (26 & 27 Vict. c. 125) and for Ireland by Statute Law (Ireland) Revision Act 1872 (35 & 36 Vict. c. 98)
- (Alienation by religious houses, etc.) c. 41 A Conira formam Collationis; and a Cessavit to recover Lands given in Alms. — repealed by Repeal of Obsolete Statutes Act 1856 (19 & 20 Vict. c. 64)
- (Fees of King's Marshall) c. 42 The several Fees of Marshals, Chamberlains, Porters of Justices in Eyre, &c. — repealed by Statute Law (Repeals) Act 1969 (c. 52)
- (Hospitallers and Templars) c. 43 Hospitallers and Templars shall draw no Man into Suit, &c. — repealed for England and Wales by Statute Law Revision Act 1863 (26 & 27 Vict. c. 125) and for Ireland by Statute Law (Ireland) Revision Act 1872 (35 & 36 Vict. c. 98)
- (Fees of officers on circuit) c. 44 The Fees of Porters bearing Verges before the Justices; and of Cirographers, Clerks, &c. — repealed for England and Wales by Statute Law Revision Act 1863 (26 & 27 Vict. c. 125) and for Ireland by Statute Law (Ireland) Revision Act 1872 (35 & 36 Vict. c. 98)
- Execution Act 1285 c. 45 The Process of Execution of Things recorded within the Year, or after. — repealed by Statute Law Revision Act 1948 (11 & 12 Geo. 6. c. 62)
- Commons Act 1285 c. 46 Lords may approve against their Neighbours. Usurpation of Commons during the Estate of particular Tenants. — repealed for Ireland by Statute Law (Ireland) Revision Act 1872 (35 & 36 Vict. c. 98), for Northern Ireland by Statute Law Revision Act 1950 (14 Geo. 6. c. 6) and for England and Wales by Commons Act 2006 (c. 26)
- Salmon Preservation Act 1285 c. 47 A Penalty for taking of Salmons at certain Times of the Year. — repealed for Eighty-five martyrs of England and Wales by Salmon Fishery Act 1861 (24 & 25 Vict. c. 109) and for Ireland Statute Law (Ireland) Revision Act 1872 (35 & 36 Vict. c. 98)
- (Real actions) c. 48 In what Cases the View of Land is grantable, and what not. — repealed for England and Wales by Statute Law Revision Act 1863 (26 & 27 Vict. c. 125) and for Ireland by Statute Law (Ireland) Revision Act 1872 (35 & 36 Vict. c. 98)
- (Maintenance and champerty) c. 49 The Penalty for buying the Title of Land depending in Suit. A Remedy for Suits where the Law faileth. — repealed by Statute Law Revision Act 1948 (11 & 12 Geo. 6. c. 62)
- (Commencement of statutes) c. 50 No Man shall depart from the King's Court without Remedy. — repealed by Civil Procedure Acts Repeal Act 1879 (42 & 43 Vict. c. 59)

Statutum Wynton̄ (Statute of Winchester) — cited as 13 Edw. 1. St. 2 in The Statutes at Large

- (Fresh Suit shall be made after Felons and Robbers from Town to Town, &c.) c. 1 Fresh Suit shall be made after Felons and Robbers from Town to Town, &c. — repealed for England and Wales by Criminal Statutes Repeal Act 1827 (7 & 8 Geo. 4. c. 27), for India by Criminal Law (India) Act 1828 (9 Geo. 4. c. 74) and for Ireland by Statute Law (Ireland) Revision Act 1872 (35 & 36 Vict. c. 98)
- (Inquiry of Felons and Robbers, and the County shall answer if they be not taken) c. 2 Inquiry of Felons and Robbers, and the Country shall answer if they be not taken. — repealed for England and Wales by Criminal Statutes Repeal Act 1827 (7 & 8 Geo. 4. c. 27), for India by Criminal Law (India) Act 1828 (9 Geo. 4. c. 74) and for Ireland by Statute Law (Ireland) Revision Act 1872 (35 & 36 Vict. c. 98)
- (This Act shall be respited until Easter next) c. 3 This Act shall be respited until Easter next. — repealed for England and Wales by Criminal Statutes Repeal Act 1827 (7 & 8 Geo. 4. c. 27), for India by Criminal Law (India) Act 1828 (9 Geo. 4. c. 74) and for Ireland by Statute Law (Ireland) Revision Act 1872 (35 & 36 Vict. c. 98)
- (At what Times the Gates of great Towns shall be shut, and when the Night Watch shall begin and end.) c. 4 At what Times the Gates of great Towns shall be shut, and when the Night-watch shall begin and end. — repealed for England and Wales by Criminal Statutes Repeal Act 1827 (7 & 8 Geo. 4. c. 27), for India by Criminal Law (India) Act 1828 (9 Geo. 4. c. 74) and for Ireland by Statute Law (Ireland) Revision Act 1872 (35 & 36 Vict. c. 98)
- Highways Act 1285 c. 5 The Breadth of Highways leading from one Market-Town to another. — repealed for England and Wales by Highways (No. 2) Act 1766 (7 Geo. 3. c. 42), for India by Criminal Law (India) Act 1828 (9 Geo. 4. c. 74) and for Ireland by Statute Law (Ireland) Revision Act 1872 (35 & 36 Vict. c. 98)
- (Fairs and markets in churchyards) c. 6 That View of Arms be made. Hue and Cry shall be followed. Fairs or Markets shall not be kept in Church-yards. — repealed for Ireland by Statute Law (Ireland) Revision Act 1872 (35 & 36 Vict. c. 98) and for England and Wales by Statute Law (Repeals) Act 1969 (c. 52)

Statutum Mercatorum (Statute of Merchants) or Recovery of Debts by Statute Merchant Act 1285 — cited as 13 Edw. 1. St. 3 in The Statutes at Large The Form of knowledging a Statute-Merchant. The Creditor's Remedy if his Debt be not paid. The King's Seals shall be sent to Keepers of Fairs. Taking of Recognisance. — repealed for England and Wales by Statute Law Revision Act 1863 (26 & 27 Vict. c. 125) and for Ireland by Statute Law (Ireland) Revision Act 1872 (35 & 36 Vict. c. 98)

Statutū Circumspecte Agatis (Statute of Circumspecte Agatis) or Prohibition to Spiritual Court Act 1285 Certain Cafes wherein the King's Prohibition doth not lie. — cited as 13 Edw. 1. St. 4 and 'Articles against the King's Prohibitions' of uncertain date in The Statutes at Large; repealed for Northern Ireland by Statute Law Revision Act 1950 (14 Geo. 6. c. 6) and for England and Wales by Ecclesiastical Jurisdiction Measure 1963 (No. 1)

Statuta Civitatis London (Statutes of the City of London) — cited as 13 Edw. 1. St. 5 in The Statutes at Large; repealed by Statute Law Revision Act 1953 (2 & 3 Eliz. 2. c. 5)

Forma Confirmationis Cartarum (The Form of Confirmation of Charters) or Form of Confirmation of Charters Act 1285 — cited as 13 Edw. 1. St. 6 in The Statutes at Large — repealed for England and Wales by Statute Law Revision Act 1863 (26 & 27 Vict. c. 125) and for Ireland by Statute Law (Ireland) Revision Act 1872 (35 & 36 Vict. c. 98)

=== Sources ===
- "13° Edw. I". The Statutes of the Realm. Vol. 1. pp. 71–105 – via HathiTrust.
- "Anno decimo tertio Edwardi I". The Statutes at Large. Vol. 1 – Magna Charta to 14 Edward III – 1225 to 1340. 16 April 1762. pp. 163–247 – via Internet Archive.
- "Anno decimo tertio Edwardi I". The Statutes at Large. Vol. 1 – Magna Charta to 14 Edward III – 1225 to 1340. Cambridge, Printed by J. Bentham. 16 April 1762. pp. 163–247 – via Internet Archive.
- Chronological Table of and Index to the Statutes. Vol. 1: To the End of the Session 59 Vict. Sess. 2 (1895) (13th ed.). London: Her Majesty's Stationery Office. 1896. pp. 14–15 – via Google Books.
- "Temporibus Hen. III, Edw. que I & II". The Statutes at Large. Vol. 1 – Magna Charta to 14 Edward III – 1225 to 1340. 16 April 1762. pp. 389–390 – via Internet Archive.
- "Temporibus Hen. III, Edw. que I & II". The Statutes at Large. Vol. 1 – Magna Charta to 14 Edward III – 1225 to 1340. Cambridge, Printed by J. Bentham. 16 April 1762. pp. 389–390 – via Internet Archive.
- Chronological Table of the Statutes: Covering the Period from 1235 to the End of 1971. London: Her Majesty's Stationery Office. 1972. pp. 12–13. ISBN 978-0-11-840096-1 – via Google Books.
- "Acts of the English Parliament from 1285". legislation.gov.uk. The National Archives.

== 1286 (14 Edw. 1) ==
This session was also traditionally cited as 14 Ed. 1 or 14 E. 1.

For Statutum Exonie, cited as 14 Edw. 1 in The Statutes at Large, see Les Estatuz de Excestre under Statutes of uncertain date.

For Articuli super precedens Statutum Exonie, cited as 14 Edw. 1 in The Statutes at Large, see Les Estatuz de Excestre under Statutes of uncertain date.

== 1289 (17 Edw. 1) ==
This session was also traditionally cited as 17 Ed. 1 or 17 E. 1.

For Ordinacio de Statu Terre Hib'n' f'ca (Ordinance made for the State of the Land of Ireland) (pro Hib.), cited as 17 Edw. 2 in The Statutes at Large, see Ordinacio de Statu Terre Hib'n' f'ca under 17 Edw. 2.

== 1290 (18 Edw. 1) ==
This session was also traditionally cited as 18 Ed. 1 or 18 E. 1.

For Modus Levandi Fines, cited as 18 Edw. 1. Stat. 4 in The Statutes at Large, see Modu Levandi Fines under Statutes of uncertain date.

Statutum domini Regis de terris vendendis et emendis (Statute concerning the Selling and Buying of Land) — this statute is sometimes known as the Statute of Westminster the Third, or more commonly as Quia Emptores; cited as Quia emptores terrarum (18 Edw. 1. Stat. 1) in The Statutes at Large. In the Republic of Ireland, chapters 1 and 2 combined are referred to as Statute Quia Emptores 1290.

- (Restraint of subinfeudation) c. 1 The Feofee shall hold his Land of the chief Lord, and not of the Feoffor. —
  still in force
- (Restraint of subinfeudation) c. 2 If Park of the Land be sold, the Services shall be apportioned. —
  still in force
- (Mortmain) c. 3 No Feoffment shall be made to assure Land in Mortmain. —
  still in force

Statutum de Quo Warranto (Statute of Quo Warranto) or Quo Warranto Act 1290 — cited in Statutes at Large as 18 Edw. 1. Stat. 2; repealed by Civil Procedure Acts Repeal Act 1879 (42 & 43 Vict. c. 59)

Statutum de Quo Warranto Novum (Another New Statute of Quo Warranto) — cited as 18 Edw. 1. Stat. 3 in The Statutes at Large; repealed by Civil Procedure Acts Repeal Act 1879 (42 & 43 Vict. c. 59)

Statutum de Consultatione (Statute of the Writ of Consultation) — cited as 24 Edw. 1 in The Statutes at Large; repealed for Northern Ireland by Statute Law Revision Act 1950 (14 Geo. 6. c. 6) and for England and Wales by Ecclesiastical Jurisdiction Measure 1963 (No. 1)

=== Sources ===
- "18° Edw. I". The Statutes of the Realm. Vol. 1. pp. 106–108 – via HathiTrust.
- "Anno decimo octavo Edwardi I". The Statutes at Large. Vol. 1 – Magna Charta to 14 Edward III – 1225 to 1340. 16 April 1762. pp. 255–259 – via Internet Archive.
- "Anno decimo octavo Edwardi I". The Statutes at Large. Vol. 1 – Magna Charta to 14 Edward III – 1225 to 1340. Cambridge, Printed by J. Bentham. 16 April 1762. pp. 255–259 – via Internet Archive.
- "Anno vicesimo quarto Edwardi I". The Statutes at Large. Vol. 1 – Magna Charta to 14 Edward III – 1225 to 1340. 16 April 1762. pp. 272–273 – via Internet Archive.
- "Anno vicesimo quarto Edwardi I". The Statutes at Large. Vol. 1 – Magna Charta to 14 Edward III – 1225 to 1340. Cambridge, Printed by J. Bentham. 16 April 1762. pp. 272–273 – via Internet Archive.
- Chronological Table of and Index to the Statutes. Vol. 1: To the End of the Session 59 Vict. Sess. 2 (1895) (13th ed.). London: Her Majesty's Stationery Office. 1896. pp. 15–16 – via Google Books.
- Chronological Table of the Statutes: Covering the Period from 1235 to the End of 1971. London: Her Majesty's Stationery Office. 1972. p. 13. ISBN 978-0-11-840096-1 – via Google Books.
- "Acts of the English Parliament from 1290". legislation.gov.uk. The National Archives.

== 1292 (20 Edw. 1) ==
This session was also traditionally cited as 20 Ed. 1 or 20 E. 1.

- D' Presentibz vocatis ad Warantū (Of Persons vouched to Warranty who are Present) — cited as Statut̃ de Vocat̃ ad War̃ (The Statute of Vouchers) 20 Edw. 1. Stat. 1 in the Statutes at Large — repealed for England and Wales by Statute Law Revision Act 1863 (26 & 27 Vict. c. 125) and for Ireland by Statute Law (Ireland) Revision Act 1872 (35 & 36 Vict. c. 98)
- Statutum de Vasto (Statute of Waste) — cited as 20 Edw. 1. Stat. 2 in the Statutes at Large — repealed for England and Wales by Statute Law Revision Act 1863 (26 & 27 Vict. c. 125) and for Ireland by Statute Law (Ireland) Revision Act 1872 (35 & 36 Vict. c. 98)
- Statutum de Defensione Juris (Statute of defending Right) — cited as 20 Edw. 1. Stat. 3 in the Statutes at Large — repealed for England and Wales by Statute Law Revision Act 1863 (26 & 27 Vict. c. 125) and for Ireland by Statute Law (Ireland) Revision Act 1872 (35 & 36 Vict. c. 98)
- De brevi de Inquisicione concedenda de terris ad manum mortuam ponendis (Statute of Writs for making Inquisitions of Lands to be put in Mortmain) — cited as being of uncertain time (temp. incert.) in The Statutes at Large— repealed for England and Wales by Statute Law Revision Act 1863 (26 & 27 Vict. c. 125) and for Ireland by Statute Law (Ireland) Revision Act 1872 (35 & 36 Vict. c. 98)
- De Inquisitionibus non allocandis de terris ponendis ad mortuam manum (Statute of Amortising Lands) — cited as Statutum de brevi de inquisitionibus concedendo de terris ad manum mortuam ponendis 34 Edw. 1 Stat. 3 in The Statutes at Large— repealed for England and Wales by Statute Law Revision Act 1863 (26 & 27 Vict. c. 125) and for Ireland by Statute Law (Ireland) Revision Act 1872 (35 & 36 Vict. c. 98)

For Statutum de Moneta, cited as 20 Edw. 1. Stat. 4 in the Statutes at Large, see Statutes of uncertain date.

For Statutum de Moneta parvum cited as 20 Edw. 1. Stat. 5 in the Statutes at Large, see Statutes of uncertain date.

For Articuli de Moneta cited as 20 Edw. 1. Stat. 6 in the Statutes at Large, see Statutum de Moneta under Statutes of uncertain date.

=== Sources ===
- "20° Edw. I". The Statutes of the Realm. Vol. 1. pp. 108–111 – via HathiTrust.
- "Anno vicesimo Edwardi I". The Statutes at Large. Vol. 1 – Magna Charta to 14 Edward III – 1225 to 1340. 16 April 1762. pp. 261–266 – via Internet Archive.
- "Anno vicesimo Edwardi I". The Statutes at Large. Vol. 1 – Magna Charta to 14 Edward III – 1225 to 1340. Cambridge, Printed by J. Bentham. 16 April 1762. pp. 261–266 – via Internet Archive.
- "Temporibus Hen. III, Edw. que I & II". The Statutes at Large. Vol. 1 – Magna Charta to 14 Edward III – 1225 to 1340. 16 April 1762. p. 400 – via Internet Archive.
- "Temporibus Hen. III, Edw. que I & II". The Statutes at Large. Vol. 1 – Magna Charta to 14 Edward III – 1225 to 1340. Cambridge, Printed by J. Bentham. 16 April 1762. p. 400 – via Internet Archive.
- "Anno tricesimo quarto Edwardi I". The Statutes at Large. Vol. 1 – Magna Charta to 14 Edward III – 1225 to 1340. 16 April 1762. pp. 318–319 – via Internet Archive.
- "Anno tricesimo quarto Edwardi I". The Statutes at Large. Vol. 1 – Magna Charta to 14 Edward III – 1225 to 1340. Cambridge, Printed by J. Bentham. 16 April 1762. pp. 318–319 – via Internet Archive.
- Chronological Table of and Index to the Statutes. Vol. 1: To the End of the Session 59 Vict. Sess. 2 (1895) (13th ed.). London: Her Majesty's Stationery Office. 1896. p. 16 – via Google Books.
- Chronological Table of the Statutes: Covering the Period from 1235 to the End of 1971. London: Her Majesty's Stationery Office. 1972. p. 13. ISBN 978-0-11-840096-1 – via Google Books.

== 1293 (21 Edw. 1) ==
This session was also traditionally cited as 21 Ed. 1 or 21 E. 1.

- Statutum de Malefactoribus in Parcis (Statute of Trespassers in Parks) — cited as 21 Edw. 1. Stat. 2 in The Statutes at Large — repealed for England and Wales by Criminal Statutes Repeal Act 1827 (7 & 8 Geo. 4. c. 27), for Ireland by Criminal Statutes (Ireland) Repeal Act 1828 (9 Geo. 4. c. 53) and for India by Criminal Law (India) Act 1828 (9 Geo. 4. c. 74)
- Justices of Assize Act 1293 Statutum de Justiciariis Assignatis (Statute of the Justices of Assize) — cited as being of uncertain time (temp. incert.) in The Statutes at Large — repealed for England and Wales by Criminal Statutes Repeal Act 1827 (7 & 8 Geo. 4. c. 27), for Ireland by Criminal Statutes (Ireland) Repeal Act 1828 (9 Geo. 4. c. 53) and for India by Criminal Law (India) Act 1828 (9 Geo. 4. c. 74)
- Statutum de illis qui debent poni in Juratis et Assisis (Statute of Persons to be put in Assizes and Juries) — cited as Stat. De iis qui ponendi sunit in Assisis (21 Edw. 1. Stat. 1) in The Statutes at Large – repealed by for England and Wales by Juries Act 1825 (6 Geo. 4. c. 50) and for Ireland by Juries (Ireland) Act 1833 (3 & 4 Will. 4. c. 91)

=== Sources ===
- "21° Edw. I". The Statutes of the Realm. Vol. 1. pp. 111–113 – via HathiTrust.
- "Anno vicesimo primo Edwardi I". The Statutes at Large. Vol. 1 – Magna Charta to 14 Edward III – 1225 to 1340. 16 April 1762. pp. 269–272 – via Internet Archive.
- "Anno vicesimo primo Edwardi I". The Statutes at Large. Vol. 1 – Magna Charta to 14 Edward III – 1225 to 1340. Cambridge, Printed by J. Bentham. 16 April 1762. pp. 269–272 – via Internet Archive.
- "Temporibus Hen. III, Edw. que I & II". The Statutes at Large. Vol. 1 – Magna Charta to 14 Edward III – 1225 to 1340. 16 April 1762. pp. 399–400 – via Internet Archive.
- "Temporibus Hen. III, Edw. que I & II". The Statutes at Large. Vol. 1 – Magna Charta to 14 Edward III – 1225 to 1340. Cambridge, Printed by J. Bentham. 16 April 1762. pp. 399–400 – via Internet Archive.
- Chronological Table of and Index to the Statutes. Vol. 1: To the End of the Session 59 Vict. Sess. 2 (1895) (13th ed.). London: Her Majesty's Stationery Office. 1896. p. 16 – via Google Books.
- Chronological Table of the Statutes: Covering the Period from 1235 to the End of 1971. London: Her Majesty's Stationery Office. 1972. p. 13. ISBN 978-0-11-840096-1 – via Google Books.

== 1295 (23 Edw. 1) ==
This session was also traditionally cited as 23 Ed. 1 or 23 E. 1.

- Statutum de Frangentibus Prisonam (Statute of Breaking Prisons) — cited as 1 Edw. 2 Stat. 2 in The Statutes at Large; repealed by Statute Law Revision Act 1948 (11 & 12 Geo. 6. c. 62)

=== Sources ===
- "23° Edw. I". The Statutes of the Realm. Vol. 1. p. 113 – via HathiTrust.
- "Anno primo Edwardi II". The Statutes at Large. Vol. 1 – Magna Charta to 14 Edward III – 1225 to 1340. 16 April 1762. p. 334 – via Internet Archive.
- "Anno primo Edwardi II". The Statutes at Large. Vol. 1 – Magna Charta to 14 Edward III – 1225 to 1340. Cambridge, Printed by J. Bentham. 16 April 1762. p. 334 – via Internet Archive.
- Chronological Table of and Index to the Statutes. Vol. 1: To the End of the Session 59 Vict. Sess. 2 (1895) (13th ed.). London: Her Majesty's Stationery Office. 1896. p. 16 – via Google Books.
- Chronological Table of the Statutes: Covering the Period from 1235 to the End of 1971. London: Her Majesty's Stationery Office. 1972. p. 13. ISBN 978-0-11-840096-1 – via Google Books.

== 1296 (24 Edw. 1) ==
This session was also traditionally cited as 24 Ed. 1 or 24 E. 1.

For the Statute of the Writ of Consultation, cited as 24 Edw. 1 in The Statutes at Large, see Statutum de Consultatione (18 Edw. 1).

== 1297 (25 Edw. 1) ==
This session was also traditionally cited as 25 Ed. 1 or 25 E. 1.

Magna Carta de Libertatibus Anglie, et de Libertatibus Foreste (The Great Charter of Liberties of England and of the Liberties of the Forest) — listed in The Statutes of the Realm, listed separately as Magna Carta and Carta de Foresta in the Chronological Table of the Statutes.

- Magna Carta — cited as Magna Charta, made 9 Hen. 3 and confirmed 25 Edw. 1 in The Statutes at Large.
  - (Confirmation of liberties) c. 1 A Confirmation of Liberties —
    still in force
  - (Reliefs) c. 2 The Relief of the King's Tenant of full Age. — repealed for England and Wales by Statute Law Revision Act 1863 (26 & 27 Vict. c. 125) and for Ireland by Statute Law (Ireland) Revision Act 1872 (35 & 36 Vict. c. 98)
  - (Wardships) c. 3 The Wardship of an Heir within Age. The Heir of a Knight. — repealed for England and Wales by Statute Law Revision Act 1863 (26 & 27 Vict. c. 125) and for Ireland by Statute Law (Ireland) Revision Act 1872 (35 & 36 Vict. c. 98)
  - (Waste during Wardship) c. 4 No Waste shall be made by a Guardian in Wards Lands. — repealed for England and Wales by Statute Law Revision Act 1863 (26 & 27 Vict. c. 125) and for Ireland by Statute Law (Ireland) Revision Act 1872 (35 & 36 Vict. c. 98)
  - (Lands in ward and temporalities of vacant archbishoprics, etc.) c. 5 Guardians shall maintain the Inheritance of their Wards: and of Bishopricks, &c. — repealed for England and Wales by Statute Law Revision Act 1863 (26 & 27 Vict. c. 125) and for Ireland by Statute Law (Ireland) Revision Act 1872 (35 & 36 Vict. c. 98)
  - (Marriage of heirs) c. 6 Heirs shall be married without Disparagement. — repealed for England and Wales by Statute Law Revision Act 1863 (26 & 27 Vict. c. 125) and for Ireland by Statute Law (Ireland) Revision Act 1872 (35 & 36 Vict. c. 98)
  - Dower Act 1297 c. 7 A Widow shall have her Marriage, Inheritance, and Quarentine. The King's Widow, &c. — repealed for England and Wales by Administration of Estates Act 1925 (15 & 16 Geo. 5. c. 23) and for Scotland and Northern Ireland by Statute Law (Repeals) Act 1969 (c. 52)
  - (Crown debt) c. 8 How Sureties shall be charge to the King. — repealed by Statute Law (Repeals) Act 1969 (c. 52)
  - (Confirmation of liberties) c. 9 The Liberties of London, and other Cities and Towns confirmed. —
    still in force
  - (Distress for services) c. 10 None shall distrain for more Service than is due. — repealed by Statute Law Revision Act 1948 (11 & 12 Geo. 6. c. 62)
  - (Common pleas) c. 11 Common Pleas shall not follow the King's Court. — repealed by Civil Procedure Acts Repeal Act 1879 (42 & 43 Vict. c. 59)
  - (Circuits) c. 12 Where and before whom Assises shall be taken. Adjournment for Difficulty. — repealed by Civil Procedure Acts Repeal Act 1879 (42 & 43 Vict. c. 59)
  - (Assizes of darrein presentment) c. 13 Assises of Darrein Presentment. — repealed for England and Wales by Statute Law Revision Act 1863 (26 & 27 Vict. c. 125) and for Ireland by Statute Law (Ireland) Revision Act 1872 (35 & 36 Vict. c. 98)
  - (Amercement of freemen and others) c. 14 How Men of all Sorts shall be amerced, and by whom. — repealed by Criminal Law Act 1967 (c. 58)
  - (Making of bridges) c. 15 Making of Bridges and Banks. — repealed by Statute Law (Repeals) Act 1969 (c. 52)
  - (Obstructing of rivers) c. 16 Defending of Banks. — repealed by Statute Law (Repeals) Act 1969 (c. 52)
  - (Pleas of the Crown) c. 17 Holding Pleas of the Crown. — repealed by Statute Law Revision Act 1892 (55 & 56 Vict. c. 19)
  - (Crown debt) c. 18 The King's Tenant his Debtor. — repealed for England and Wales and Scotland by Crown Proceedings Act 1947 (10 & 11 Geo. 6. c. 44) and for Northern Ireland by Northern Ireland Crown Proceedings Order 1949 (SI 1949/1836)
  - (Purveyance for a Castle) c. 19 Purveyance for a Castle.— repealed for England and Wales by Statute Law Revision Act 1863 (26 & 27 Vict. c. 125) and for Ireland by Statute Law (Ireland) Revision Act 1872 (35 & 36 Vict. c. 98)
  - (Castle ward) c. 20 Doing of Castle-ward. — repealed for England and Wales by Statute Law Revision Act 1863 (26 & 27 Vict. c. 125) and for Ireland by Statute Law (Ireland) Revision Act 1872 (35 & 36 Vict. c. 98)
  - (Purveyance for Carriage) c. 21 Taking of Horses, Carts, and Wood. — repealed for England and Wales by Statute Law Revision Act 1863 (26 & 27 Vict. c. 125) and for Ireland by Statute Law (Ireland) Revision Act 1872 (35 & 36 Vict. c. 98)
  - (Lands of felons) c. 22 — repealed by Statute Law Revision Act 1948 (11 & 12 Geo. 6. c. 62)
  - (Suppression of weirs) c. 23 In what Places Wears shall be put down. — repealed by Statute Law (Repeals) Act 1969 (c. 52)
  - (Writ of præcipe) c. 24 In what Case a Præcipe in Capite is not grantable. — repealed for England and Wales by Statute Law Revision Act 1863 (26 & 27 Vict. c. 125) and for Ireland by Statute Law (Ireland) Revision Act 1872 (35 & 36 Vict. c. 98)
  - (Measures and weights) c. 25 There shall be but one Measure throughout the Realm. — repealed by Statute Law Revision Act 1948 (11 & 12 Geo. 6. c. 62)
  - (Criminal writs) c. 26 Inquisition of Life and Member. — repealed for England and Wales by Offences Against the Person Act 1828 (9 Geo. 4. c. 31), for Ireland by Offences Against the Person (Ireland) Act 1829 (10 Geo. 4. c. 34) and for India by Criminal Law (India) Act 1828 (9 Geo. 4. c. 74).
  - (Where the King shall not have Wardship) c. 27 Tenure of the King in Socage, and of another by Knights Service. Petit Serjeanty.— repealed for England and Wales by Statute Law Revision Act 1863 (26 & 27 Vict. c. 125) and for Ireland by Statute Law (Ireland) Revision Act 1872 (35 & 36 Vict. c. 98)
  - (Wager of law) c. 28 Wager of Law shall not be without Witness. — repealed for England and Wales by Statute Law Revision Act 1863 (26 & 27 Vict. c. 125) and for Ireland by Statute Law (Ireland) Revision Act 1872 (35 & 36 Vict. c. 98)
  - Criminal and Civil Justice Act 1297 c. 29 None shall be condemned without Trial. Justice shall not be sold or deferred. —
    still in force
  - (Treatment of foreign merchants) c. 30 Merchants Strangers coming into this Realm shall be well used. — repealed by Statute Law (Repeals) Act 1969 (c. 52)
  - (Baronies escheated to the Crown) c. 31 Tenure of a Barony coming into the King's Hands by Eschete. — repealed for England and Wales by Statute Law Revision Act 1863 (26 & 27 Vict. c. 125) and for Ireland by Statute Law (Ireland) Revision Act 1872 (35 & 36 Vict. c. 98)
  - (Restraint on alienation of land) c. 32 Lands shall not be aliened to the Prejudice of the Lord's Service. — repealed by Statute Law Revision Act 1887 (50 & 51 Vict. c. 59)
  - (Custody of vacant abbeys) c. 33 Patrons of Abbies shall have the Custody of them in the time of Vacation. — repealed for England and Wales by Statute Law Revision Act 1863 (26 & 27 Vict. c. 125) and for Ireland by Statute Law (Ireland) Revision Act 1872 (35 & 36 Vict. c. 98)
  - (Appeal of death) c. 34 In what only Case a Woman shall have an Appeal of Death. — repealed for England and Wales by Statute Law Revision Act 1863 (26 & 27 Vict. c. 125) and for Ireland by Statute Law (Ireland) Revision Act 1872 (35 & 36 Vict. c. 98)
  - (Frankpledge: sheriff's tourn) c. 35 At what Time shall be kept a County Court, Sheriff's Turn, and a Leet. — repealed by Sheriffs Act 1887 (50 & 51 Vict. c. 55)
  - (Mortmain) c. 36 No Land shall be given in Mortmain. — repealed for England and Wales by Statute Law Revision Act 1863 (26 & 27 Vict. c. 125) and for Ireland by Statute Law (Ireland) Revision Act 1872 (35 & 36 Vict. c. 98)
  - (Confirmation of customs and liberties) c. 37 A Subsidy in respect of this Charter, and the Charter of Forests, granted to the King.
- Carta de Foresta (Charter of the Forest) or Forest Act 1297 — cited as Charta Forestæ, made 9 Hen. 3 (1225) and confirmed 28 Edw. 1 (1299) in The Statutes at Large
  - c. 1 Certain Grounds shall be disafforested. — repealed by Wild Creatures and Forest Laws Act 1971 (c. 47)
  - c. 2 Who are bound to the Summons of the Forest. — repealed by Wild Creatures and Forest Laws Act 1971 (c. 47)
  - c. 3 Certain Woods made Forest shall be disafforested. — repealed by Wild Creatures and Forest Laws Act 1971 (c. 47)
  - c. 4 No Purpresture, Waste,. or Assert, shall be made in Forests. — repealed by Wild Creatures and Forest Laws Act 1971 (c. 47)
  - c. 5 When Rangers shall make their Range in the Forest. — repealed by Wild Creatures and Forest Laws Act 1971 (c. 47)
  - c. 6 Lawing of Dogs in Forests. — repealed by Wild Creatures and Forest Laws Act 1971 (c. 47)
  - c. 7 In what only Cases Gathering shall be in Forests. — repealed by Wild Creatures and Forest Laws Act 1971 (c. 47)
  - c. 8 When Swanimotes shall be kept, and who shall repair to them. — repealed by Wild Creatures and Forest Laws Act 1971 (c. 47)
  - c. 9 Who may take Agistment and Pawnage in Forests. — repealed by Wild Creatures and Forest Laws Act 1971 (c. 47)
  - c. 10 The Punishment for killing the King's Deer. — repealed for England and Wales by Criminal Statutes Repeal Act 1827 (7 & 8 Geo. 4. c. 27), for Ireland by Criminal Statutes (Ireland) Repeal Act 1828 (9 Geo. 4. c. 53) and for India by Criminal Law (India) Act 1828 (9 Geo. 4. c. 74)
  - c. 11 A Nobleman may kill a Deer in the Forest. — repealed by Wild Creatures and Forest Laws Act 1971 (c. 47)
  - c. 12 How a Freeman may use his Land in the Forest. — repealed by Wild Creatures and Forest Laws Act 1971 (c. 47)
  - c. 13 How a Freeman may use his Land in the Forest. — repealed by Wild Creatures and Forest Laws Act 1971 (c. 47)
  - c. 14 Who may take Chiminage or Toll in a Forest, for what cause, and how much. — repealed by Wild Creatures and Forest Laws Act 1971 (c. 47)
  - c. 15 A Pardon of Outlaws of Trespass within the Forest. — repealed by Wild Creatures and Forest Laws Act 1971 (c. 47)
  - c. 16 How Plea of the Forest shall be holden. — repealed by Wild Creatures and Forest Laws Act 1971 (c. 47)
- De Interpretatione Clausule contente in Libertatibus (On the Interpretation of the Content Clause in Liberties) Rot. Claus. 18 Hen. III. m. 10. d — this instrument, which is printed in The Statutes of the Realm, is omitted from the Chronological Table of the Statutes; not printed in The Statutes at Large.

A parliament that met at London from 10 October 1297.

- Confirmatio Cartarum (Confirmation of the Charters) — cited as 25 Edw. 1. Stat. 1 in The Statutes at Large
  - c. 1 A Confirmation of the Great Charter, and the Charter of the Forest
  - c. 2 Judgements given against the said Charters shall be void. — repealed by Statute Law (Repeals) Act 1969 (c. 52)
  - c. 3 The said Charters shall be read in Cathedral Churches twice in the Year. — repealed by Statute Law Revision Act 1887 (50 & 51 Vict. c. 59)
  - c. 4 Excommunication shall be pronounced against the Breakers of the said Charters. — repealed by Statute Law Revision Act 1887 (50 & 51 Vict. c. 59)
  - c. 5 Aids, Tasks, and Prises granted to the King shall not be taken for a Custom. — repealed by Statute Law (Repeals) Act 1969 (c. 52)
  - c. 6 The King or his Heirs will take no Aids or Prises, but by the Consent of the Realm, and for the common Profit thereof. —
    still in force
  - c. 7 A Release of Toll taken by the King for Wool; and a Grant that he will not take the like without common Consent and good Will. — repealed by Statute Law Revision Act 1948 (11 & 12 Geo. 6. c. 62) and Statute Law (Repeals) Act 1969 (c. 52)
- The King's Pardon to Humfrey de Bohun, and others — not printed in The Statutes at Large; repealed by Statute Law Revision Act 1948 (11 & 12 Geo. 6. c. 62)
- Statutum de Tallagio (Statute concerning Tallage) — cited as 34 Edw. 1 Stat. 4 in The Statutes at Large
  - c. 1 The King or his Heirs shall have no Tallage or Aid without Consent of Parliament. —
    still in force
  - c. 2 Nothing shall be purveyed to the King's Use without the Owner's Consent. — repealed by Statute Law (Repeals) Act 1969 (c. 52)
  - c. 3 Nothing shall be taken of Sacks of Wooll by Colour of Maletols. — repealed by Statute Law (Repeals) Act 1969 (c. 52)
  - c. 4 All Laws, Liberties, and Customs confirmed. — repealed by Statute Law (Repeals) Act 1969 (c. 52)
  - c. 5 Pardon granted to certain Offenders. — repealed by Statute Law Revision Act 1887 (50 & 51 Vict. c. 59) and Statute Law (Repeals) Act 1969 (c. 52)
  - c. 6 The Curse of the Church shall be pronounced against the Breakers of this Charter. — repealed by Statute Law Revision Act 1887 (50 & 51 Vict. c. 59) and Statute Law (Repeals) Act 1969 (c. 52)
- Sententia lata super Confirmatione Cartarum (Sentence of the Clergy given on the Confirmation of the Charters) — cited as Sententia Domino R. Archiepiscopi super premissis (25 Edw. 1 Stat. 2) in The Statutes at Large— repealed for England and Wales by Statute Law Revision Act 1863 (26 & 27 Vict. c. 125) and for Ireland by Statute Law (Ireland) Revision Act 1872 (35 & 36 Vict. c. 98)

=== Sources ===
- "25° Edw. I". The Statutes of the Realm. Vol. 1. pp. 114–126 – via HathiTrust.
- "Anno nono Edwardi I". The Statutes at Large. Vol. 1 – Magna Charta to 14 Edward III – 1225 to 1340. 16 April 1762. pp. 1–23 – via Internet Archive.
- "Anno nono Edwardi I". The Statutes at Large. Vol. 1 – Magna Charta to 14 Edward III – 1225 to 1340. Cambridge, Printed by J. Bentham. 16 April 1762. pp. 1–23 – via Internet Archive.
- "Anno vicesimo quinto Edwardi I". The Statutes at Large. Vol. 1 – Magna Charta to 14 Edward III – 1225 to 1340. 16 April 1762. pp. 273–277 – via Internet Archive.
- "Anno vicesimo quinto Edwardi I". The Statutes at Large. Vol. 1 – Magna Charta to 14 Edward III – 1225 to 1340. Cambridge, Printed by J. Bentham. 16 April 1762. pp. 273–277 – via Internet Archive.
- "Anno tricesimo quarto Edwardi I". The Statutes at Large. Vol. 1 – Magna Charta to 14 Edward III – 1225 to 1340. 16 April 1762. pp. 319–321 – via Internet Archive.
- "Anno tricesimo quarto Edwardi I". The Statutes at Large. Vol. 1 – Magna Charta to 14 Edward III – 1225 to 1340. Cambridge, Printed by J. Bentham. 16 April 1762. pp. 319–321 – via Internet Archive.
- Chronological Table of and Index to the Statutes. Vol. 1: To the End of the Session 59 Vict. Sess. 2 (1895) (13th ed.). London: Her Majesty's Stationery Office. 1896. p. 17 – via Google Books.
- Chronological Table of the Statutes: Covering the Period from 1235 to the End of 1971. London: Her Majesty's Stationery Office. 1972. pp. 13–14. ISBN 978-0-11-840096-1 – via Google Books.
- "Acts of the English Parliament from 1297". legislation.gov.uk. The National Archives.

== 1299 (27 Edw. 1) ==
This session was also traditionally cited as 27 Ed. 1 or 27 E. 1.

- Statutum de Finibus Levatis (Statute of Fines Levied) — this statute consists of four chapters and a part preceding c. 1; cited as 27 Edw. 1. Stat. 1 in The Statutes at Large; repealed for England and Wales by Statute Law Revision and Civil Procedure Act 1881 (44 & 45 Vict. c. 59) and for Scotland and Northern Ireland by Statute Law Revision Act 1950 (14 Geo. 6. c. 6)
  - c. 1 No Exception to a Fine that the Defendant was seized. Fines shall be openly read. — repealed for England and Wales by Statute Law Revision Act 1863 (26 & 27 Vict. c. 125) and for Ireland by Statute Law (Ireland) Revision Act 1872 (35 & 36 Vict. c. 98)
  - c. 2 A Sheriff shall levy no more Issues than he hath Warrant for. His Tallies. — repealed for England and Wales by Statute Law Revision Act 1863 (26 & 27 Vict. c. 125) and for Ireland by Statute Law (Ireland) Revision Act 1872 (35 & 36 Vict. c. 98)
  - c. 3 Justices of Assise shall be of Gaol-delivery. Who shall punish Officers bailing such as are not bailable. — repealed for England and Wales by Statute Law Revision and Civil Procedure Act 1881 (44 & 45 Vict. c. 59) and for Scotland and Northern Ireland by Statute Law Revision Act 1950 (14 Geo. 6. c. 6)
  - c. 4 Nisi Prius shall be granted before one of the Justices of the Court where the Suit is commenced. — repealed for England and Wales by Statute Law Revision and Civil Procedure Act 1881 (44 & 45 Vict. c. 59) and for Scotland and Northern Ireland by Statute Law Revision Act 1950 (14 Geo. 6. c. 6)
- Ordinatio de Libertatibus perquirendis (An Ordinance of Purchasing Liberties) — this ordinance consists of 5 chapters; cited as 27 Edw. 1. Stat. 2 in The Statutes at Large; repealed by Statute Law Revision Act 1887 (50 & 51 Vict. c. 59)
- Statutum de falsa Moneta (A Statute concerning False Money) — repealed by Coinage Offences Act 1832 (2 & 3 Will. 4. c. 34)

=== Sources ===
- "27° Edw. I". The Statutes of the Realm. Vol. 1. pp. 126–135 – via HathiTrust.
- "Anno vicesimo septimo Edwardi I". The Statutes at Large. Vol. 1 – Magna Charta to 14 Edward III – 1225 to 1340. 16 April 1762. pp. 277–286 – via Internet Archive.
- "Anno vicesimo septimo Edwardi I". The Statutes at Large. Vol. 1 – Magna Charta to 14 Edward III – 1225 to 1340. Cambridge, Printed by J. Bentham. 16 April 1762. pp. 277–286 – via Internet Archive.
- Chronological Table of and Index to the Statutes. Vol. 1: To the End of the Session 59 Vict. Sess. 2 (1895) (13th ed.). London: Her Majesty's Stationery Office. 1896. p. 17 – via Google Books.
- Chronological Table of the Statutes: Covering the Period from 1235 to the End of 1971. London: Her Majesty's Stationery Office. 1972. p. 14. ISBN 978-0-11-840096-1 – via Google Books.

== 1300 (28 Edw. 1) ==
This session was also traditionally cited as 28 Ed. 1 or 28 E. 1.

For The Statute of Wards and Relief, cited as 28 Edw. 1. Stat. 1 in The Statutes at Large, see Statutum de Wardis et Releviis under Statutes of uncertain date.

- Articuli super Cartas (Articles upon the Charters) — cited as 28 Edw. 1. Stat. 3 in The Statutes at Large
  - Confirmation of Charters Act 1300 c. 1 A Confirmation of the Great Charter, and the Charter of the Forest. — repealed for England and Wales by Statute Law Revision Act 1863 (26 & 27 Vict. c. 125) and for Ireland by Statute Law (Ireland) Revision Act 1872 (35 & 36 Vict. c. 98)
  - (Purveyance) c. 2 None shall take Prises, but the King's Purveyors and their Deputies. — repealed for England and Wales by Statute Law Revision Act 1863 (26 & 27 Vict. c. 125) and for Ireland by Statute Law (Ireland) Revision Act 1872 (35 & 36 Vict. c. 98)
  - Inquests within Verge, etc. Act 1300 c. 3 Of what Things only the Marshal of the King's House shall hold Plea. Which Coroners shall enquire of the Death of a Man Slain within the Verge. — repealed for England and Wales by Coroners Act 1887 (50 & 51 Vict. c. 71) and for Northern Ireland by Statute Law Revision Act 1950 (14 Geo. 6. c. 6)
  - (Common pleas) c. 4 Common Pleas shall not be holden in the Exchequer. — repealed for England and Wales by Statute Law Revision Act 1863 (26 & 27 Vict. c. 125) and for Ireland by Statute Law (Ireland) Revision Act 1872 (35 & 36 Vict. c. 98)
  - (Chancery and Queen's Bench) c. 5 The Chancellor and the Justices of the King's Bench shall follow the King. — repealed by Repeal of Obsolete Statutes Act 1856 (19 & 20 Vict. c. 64)
  - (Common law writs) c. 6 No Writ concerning the Common Law shall be awarded under any petit Seal. — repealed by Civil Procedure Acts Repeal Act 1879 (42 & 43 Vict. c. 59)
  - Constable of Dover Castle Act 1300 c. 7 The Authority of the Constable of the Castle of Dover touching holding Plea and Distresses. — repealed for England and Wales by Statute Law Revision Act 1863 (26 & 27 Vict. c. 125) and for Ireland by Statute Law (Ireland) Revision Act 1872 (35 & 36 Vict. c. 98)
  - (Election of sheriffs) c. 8 The Inhabitants of every County shall make Choice of their Sheriffs being not of Fee. — repealed for England and Wales by Statute Law Revision Act 1863 (26 & 27 Vict. c. 125) and for Ireland by Statute Law (Ireland) Revision Act 1872 (35 & 36 Vict. c. 98)
  - (Juries) c. 9 What Sort of People shall be returned upon every Jury. — repealed for England and Wales by Statute Law Revision Act 1863 (26 & 27 Vict. c. 125) and for Ireland by Statute Law (Ireland) Revision Act 1872 (35 & 36 Vict. c. 98)
  - (Embracery, etc.) c. 10 The Remedy against Conspirators, false Informers, and Embracers of Juries. — repealed by Statute Law (Repeals) Act 1969 (c. 52)
  - (Champerty) c. 11 Nothing shall be taken to maintain any Matter in Suit. — repealed by Criminal Law Act 1967 (c. 58)
  - (Distress for Crown debt) c. 12 What Distress shall be taken for the King's Debt and how it shall be used. — repealed by Statute Law Revision Act 1953 (2 & 3 Eliz. 2. c. 5)
  - (Election of sheriffs) c. 13 What Sort of Persons the Commons of Shires shall chuse for their Sheriffs. — repealed by Sheriffs Act 1887 (50 & 51 Vict. c. 55)
  - (Farming of bailiwicks, etc.) c. 14 Bailiwicks and Hundreds mail not be letten too dear, to charge the People with Contribution. — repealed for England and Wales by Statute Law Revision Act 1863 (26 & 27 Vict. c. 125) and for Ireland by Statute Law (Ireland) Revision Act 1872 (35 & 36 Vict. c. 98)
  - (Real actions) c. 15 In Summons and Attachments in Plea of Land the Writ shall contain fifteen Days. — repealed for England and Wales by Statute Law Revision Act 1863 (26 & 27 Vict. c. 125) and for Ireland by Statute Law (Ireland) Revision Act 1872 (35 & 36 Vict. c. 98)
  - (False returns) c. 16 What shall be done with them that make false Return of Writs. — repealed by Statute Law Revision and Civil Procedure Act 1881 (44 & 45 Vict. c. 59)
  - (Observance of Statute of Winchester) c. 17 The Statute of Winchester shall be read four Times in the Year, and put in Execution. — repealed for England and Wales by Statute Law Revision Act 1863 (26 & 27 Vict. c. 125) and for Ireland by Statute Law (Ireland) Revision Act 1872 (35 & 36 Vict. c. 98)
  - (Wardship) c. 18 Escheators shall commit no Waste in Wards Lands. — repealed for England and Wales by Statute Law Revision Act 1863 (26 & 27 Vict. c. 125) and for Ireland by Statute Law (Ireland) Revision Act 1872 (35 & 36 Vict. c. 98)
  - (Restoration of issues of lands seized) c. 19 In what Case the Owner shall have his Lands delivered out of the King's Hands with the Issues. — repealed by Statute Law (Repeals) Act 1969 (c. 52)
  - Vessels of Gold, Assaying, etc., of Act 1300 c. 20 Vessels of Gold shall be assayed, touched and marked. The King's Prerogative shall be saved. — repealed by Repeal of Obsolete Statutes Act 1856 (19 & 20 Vict. c. 64) and Statute Law (Repeals) Act 1969 (c. 52)

Chapters 10 and 11 combined are referred to as the Champerty and Embracery Act 1300 in the Republic of Ireland.

- Appeals by Provors in Prison Act 1300 Statutum de Appellatis (Statute for Persons appealed) — cited as 28 Edw. 1. Stat. 2 in The Statutes at Large— repealed for England and Wales by Statute Law Revision Act 1863 (26 & 27 Vict. c. 125) and for Ireland by Statute Law (Ireland) Revision Act 1872 (35 & 36 Vict. c. 98)

=== Sources ===
- "28° Edw. I". The Statutes of the Realm. Vol. 1. pp. 136–141 – via HathiTrust.
- "Anno vicesimo octavo Edwardi I". The Statutes at Large. Vol. 1 – Magna Charta to 14 Edward III – 1225 to 1340. 16 April 1762. pp. 287–302 – via Internet Archive.
- "Anno vicesimo octavo Edwardi I". The Statutes at Large. Vol. 1 – Magna Charta to 14 Edward III – 1225 to 1340. Cambridge, Printed by J. Bentham. 16 April 1762. pp. 287–302 – via Internet Archive.
- Chronological Table of and Index to the Statutes. Vol. 1: To the End of the Session 59 Vict. Sess. 2 (1895) (13th ed.). London: Her Majesty's Stationery Office. 1896. pp. 17–18 – via Google Books.
- Chronological Table of the Statutes: Covering the Period from 1235 to the End of 1971. London: Her Majesty's Stationery Office. 1972. pp. 14–15. ISBN 978-0-11-840096-1 – via Google Books.

== 1301 (29 Edw. 1) ==
A parliament at Lincoln.

This session was also traditionally cited as 29 Ed. 1 or 29 E. 1.

- Statutum de Escaetoribus (Statute for Escheators), also called the Statute of Lincoln — repealed by Escheat (Procedure) Act 1887 (50 & 51 Vict. c. 53)

=== Sources ===
- "29° Edw. I". The Statutes of the Realm. Vol. 1. pp. 142–143 – via HathiTrust.
- Chronological Table of and Index to the Statutes. Vol. 1: To the End of the Session 59 Vict. Sess. 2 (1895) (13th ed.). London: Her Majesty's Stationery Office. 1896. p. 18 – via Google Books.
- Chronological Table of the Statutes: Covering the Period from 1235 to the End of 1971. London: Her Majesty's Stationery Office. 1972. p. 15. ISBN 978-0-11-840096-1 – via Google Books.

== 1303 (31 Edw. 1) ==
This session was also traditionally cited as 31 Ed. 1 or 31 E. 1.

For Tractatus de Ponderibus et Mensuris, cited as 31 Edw. 1 in The Statutes at Large, see Assisa de Ponderibz et Mensuris under Statutes of uncertain date.

== 1305 (33 Edw. 1) ==
This session was also traditionally cited as 33 Ed. 1 or 33 E. 1.

For Statutum De Protectionibus (Statute of Protections), cited as 33 Edw. 1. Stat. 1 in The Statutes at Large, see Statutü de Protectionibus non allocandis under Statutes of uncertain date.

For the Statute of Champerty, cited as 33 Edw. 1. Stat. 3 in The Statutes at Large, see Statutum de Conspiratoribus under Statutes of uncertain date.

For An Ordinance for Measuring of Lands, cited as 33 Edw. 1. Stat. 6 in The Statutes at Large, see Statutum de Admensuratione Terre under Statutes of uncertain date.

Ordinatio de Inquisitionibus (An Ordinance for Inquests) — cited as 33 Edw. 1. Stat. 4 in The Statutes at Large; repealed for England and Wales by Juries Act 1825 (6 Geo. 4. c. 50) and for Ireland by Criminal Statutes (Ireland) Repeal Act 1828 (9 Geo. 4. c. 53) and Juries (Ireland) Act 1833 (3 & 4 Will. 4. c. 91)

Ordinatio Foreste (An Ordinance of the Forest) — cited as 33 Edw. 1. Stat. 5 in The Statutes at Large; repealed by Wild Creatures and Forest Laws Act 1971 (c. 47)

Ordinatio de Conspiratoribus (An Ordinance concerning Conspirators) — cited as 'A Definition of Conspirators' (33 Edw. 1 Stat. 2) in The Statutes at Large; repealed by Criminal Law Act 1967 (c. 58)

=== Sources ===
- "33° Edw. I". The Statutes of the Realm. Vol. 1. pp. 143–145 – via HathiTrust.
- "Anno tricesimo tertio Edwardi I". The Statutes at Large. Vol. 1 – Magna Charta to 14 Edward III – 1225 to 1340. 16 April 1762. pp. 307–311 – via Internet Archive.
- "Anno tricesimo tertio Edwardi I". The Statutes at Large. Vol. 1 – Magna Charta to 14 Edward III – 1225 to 1340. Cambridge, Printed by J. Bentham. 16 April 1762. pp. 307–311 – via Internet Archive.
- Chronological Table of and Index to the Statutes. Vol. 1: To the End of the Session 59 Vict. Sess. 2 (1895) (13th ed.). London: Her Majesty's Stationery Office. 1896. p. 18 – via Google Books.
- Chronological Table of the Statutes: Covering the Period from 1235 to the End of 1971. London: Her Majesty's Stationery Office. 1972. p. 15. ISBN 978-0-11-840096-1 – via Google Books.

== 1306 (34 Edw. 1) ==
A parliament held from 27 May 1306.

This session was also traditionally cited as 34 Ed. 1 or 34 E. 1.

For "The Oath of the Sheriff", cited as 34 Edw. 1 in The Statutes at Large, see Le Serement du Visconte under Statutes of uncertain date.

For "Articles of Inquisition upon the Statute of Winchester", cited as 34 Edw. 1. Stat. 2 in The Statutes at Large, see Articuli Inquisic' super Statutum Wyntoniensi under Statutes of uncertain date.

For "A Statute of Amortifying Lands", cited as 34 Edw. 1. Stat. 3 in The Statutes at Large, see De Inquisitionibus non allocandis de terris ponendis ad mortuam manum (20 Edw. 1).

For Statutum de Tallagio, cited as 34 Edw. 1. Stat. 4 in The Statutes at Large, see 25 Edw. 1.

- Statutum de Moneta de conjunctim Feoffatis (Statute of Joint-Tenants) Jointenancy pleaded in Abutement of a Writ, &c. — cited as 34 Edw. 1. Stat. 1 in The Statutes at Large; repealed for Ireland by Statute Law (Ireland) Revision Act 1872 (35 & 36 Vict. c. 98) and for England and Wales by Statute Law Revision Act 1863 (26 & 27 Vict. c. 125) and Statute Law Revision Act 1948 (11 & 12 Geo. 6. c. 62)
- Forest Act 1305 Ordinatio Foreste (An Ordinance of the Forest) — cited as 34 Edw. 1. Stat. 5 in The Statutes at Large; repealed for England and Wales by Juries Act 1825 (6 Geo. 4. c. 50), for Ireland by Juries (Ireland) Act 1833 (3 & 4 Will. 4. c. 91) and for the United Kingdom by Crown Estate Act 1961 (9 & 10 Eliz. 2. c. 55) and Wild Creatures and Forest Laws Act 1971 (c. 47)

=== Sources ===
- "34° Edw. I". The Statutes of the Realm. Vol. 1. pp. 145–149 – via HathiTrust.
- "Anno tricesimo quarto Edwardi I". The Statutes at Large. Vol. 1 – Magna Charta to 14 Edward III – 1225 to 1340. 16 April 1762. pp. 313–317, 321–326 – via Internet Archive.
- "Anno tricesimo quarto Edwardi I". The Statutes at Large. Vol. 1 – Magna Charta to 14 Edward III – 1225 to 1340. Cambridge, Printed by J. Bentham. 16 April 1762. pp. 313–317, 321–326 – via Internet Archive.
- Chronological Table of and Index to the Statutes. Vol. 1: To the End of the Session 59 Vict. Sess. 2 (1895) (13th ed.). London: Her Majesty's Stationery Office. 1896. p. 18 – via Google Books.
- Chronological Table of the Statutes: Covering the Period from 1235 to the End of 1971. London: Her Majesty's Stationery Office. 1972. p. 15. ISBN 978-0-11-840096-1 – via Google Books.

== 1307 ==
=== 35 Edw. 1 ===
A Parliament of King Edward I which met at Carlisle from 20 January 1307 until March 1307.

This session was also traditionally cited as 35 Ed. 1 or 35 E. 1.

For Ne Rector prosternat Arbores in Cemiterio, cited as 35 Edw. 1. Stat. 2 in The Statutes at Large, see Statutes of uncertain date.

- Abbeys and Alien Superiors Act 1307 Statutum Karlioli (Statute of Carlisle) — cited as Statum De Asportatis Religioforum (35 Edw. 1. Stat. 1) in The Statutes at Large— repealed for England and Wales by Statute Law Revision Act 1863 (26 & 27 Vict. c. 125) and for Ireland by Statute Law (Ireland) Revision Act 1872 (35 & 36 Vict. c. 98)

==== Sources ====
- "35° Edw. I". The Statutes of the Realm. Vol. 1. pp. 150–152 – via HathiTrust.
- "Anno tricesimo quinto Edwardi I". The Statutes at Large. Vol. 1 – Magna Charta to 14 Edward III – 1225 to 1340. 16 April 1762. pp. 326–331 – via Internet Archive.
- "Anno tricesimo quinto Edwardi I". The Statutes at Large. Vol. 1 – Magna Charta to 14 Edward III – 1225 to 1340. Cambridge, Printed by J. Bentham. 16 April 1762. pp. 326–331 – via Internet Archive.
- Chronological Table of and Index to the Statutes. Vol. 1: To the End of the Session 59 Vict. Sess. 2 (1895) (13th ed.). London: Her Majesty's Stationery Office. 1896. p. 18 – via Google Books.
- Chronological Table of the Statutes: Covering the Period from 1235 to the End of 1971. London: Her Majesty's Stationery Office. 1972. p. 15. ISBN 978-0-11-840096-1 – via Google Books.

=== 1 Edw. 2 ===
This session was also traditionally cited as 1 Ed. 2 or 1 E. 2.

For A Statute for Knights, cited as 1 Edw. 2. Stat. 1 in The Statutes at Large, see Statutum de respectu Milit' habendo under Statutes of uncertain date.

For De frangentibus Prisonam, cited as 1 Edw. 2. Stat. 2 in The Statutes at Large, see Statutum de Frangentibus Prisonam (23 Edw. 1).

== See also ==
- List of acts of the Parliament of England
