= Distress Act 1285 =

Act of the Parliament of England

Distress Act 1285 (Note: The citation of this act by this short title was authorised by section 5 of, and the second schedule to, the Statute Law Revision Act 1948. Due to the repeal of those provisions, it is now authorised by section 19(2) of the Interpretation Act 1978.) (Note: The citation of this act as the Distress Act, 1285 is authorised for the Republic of Ireland by section 1(1) of, and part I of schedule 2 to, the Short Titles Act 1962. The comma may be omitted on the authority of section 14(3)(a) of the Interpretation Act 2005.)
- Act of Parliament
- Parliament of England
- Long title: No distress but by bailiffs known and sworn. (Note: These words are printed against this act in the second column of the second schedule to the Statute Law Revision Act 1948, which is headed "Title".)
- Citation: 13 Edw. 1. c. 37
- Territorial extent: England and Wales; Ireland

Dates
- Commencement: 1 April 1285 (Note: Start of session.)
- Repealed: 1 January 1970

Other legislation
- Repealed by: Statute Law (Repeals) Act 1969

Status: Repealed

Text of statute as originally enacted

The Distress Act 1285 (13 Edw. 1. c. 37) was an act of the Parliament of England. It was chapter 37 of the Statute of Westminster the Second (13 Edw. 1. St. 1).

== Subsequent developments ==
The whole act was repealed by section 1 of, and part VII of the schedule to, the Statute Law (Repeals) Act 1969.
