= Bissextus =

Leap day (24 February used for two days)

Bissext, or bissextus (from Latin bis 'twice' and sextus 'sixth') is the leap day which is added to the Julian calendar every fourth year and to the Gregorian calendar almost every fourth year to compensate for the almost six hour difference in length between a common calendar year of 365 days and the average length of the solar year.

In the ancient Julian calendar, 24 February – ante diem sextum Kalendas Martias, the 6th day before the calends, or 1 March, counting backwards inclusively in the Roman style (1/3, 28/2, 27/2, 26/2, 25/2, 24/2) – was doubled in a leap year. Both days had the same date, the earlier one called ante diem bis sextum Kalendas Martias and the later one named ante diem sextum Kalendas Martias (the Latin word bis means 'second' or 'twice'). The calendar then proceeded as usual, with the day after both labelled ante diem quintum Kalendas Martias [fifth day before the Kalends] (25 February), as in common years. The placement of the doubled day within this part of February was that formerly reserved for Mercedonius, the intercalary month that had been replaced by the single leap day. In modern usage, with the exception of some ecclesiastical calendars, this intercalary day is added for convenience at the end of the month of February, as 29 February, and years in which February has 29 days are called "bissextile years" or leap years. (Note: Actual ecclesiastic practice varied. Campion (1870) reports the 23rd and the 25th being doubled instead at various times. Pollard (1940) reports various dates in February being used in England; on at least one occasion, even a date in January was used.)

Abandonment of the awkward practice of having two days with the same date appears to have evolved by custom and practice. (Note: Pollard (1940) says "But in spite of Edward I's ordinance and Seymour's meticulous observance thereof as late as 1552, it is clear that the bi-sextile day had in common usage lost its etymological meaning".) In the course of the fifteenth century, "29 February" appears increasingly often in legal documents – although the records of the proceedings of the House of Commons of England continued to use the old system until the middle of the sixteenth century. It was not until passage of the Calendar (New Style) Act 1750 that 29 February was formally recognised in British law.

== Bissextile ==
Provisio de Anno Bisextili et Die
- Act of Parliament
- Parliament of England
- Long title: A Provision for the Day in Leap-Year.
- Citation: 40 Hen. 3 (Note: This is the citation in The Statutes of the Realm); 21 Hen. 3 (Note: This is the citation in The Statutes at Large)
- Territorial extent: England and Wales; Ireland

Dates
- Repealed: 15 August 1879

Other legislation
- Repealed by: Civil Procedure Acts Repeal Act 1879

Status: Repealed

Text of statute as originally enacted

The term is first defined in English law, in the statute De Anno et Die Bissextili (Concerning [the] leap year and leap day, 40 Hen. 3, 1256), which defines the bissextile day as consisting of two actual days. (This was to clarify what should happen when "an essoin was given for a month" but the month was February in a leap year.)

Statute concerning [the] leap year and leap day

The day of the leap year, and the day before, shall be holden for one day
THE King unto his Justices of the Bench, greeting. Know ye, that where within our Realm of England, it was doubted of the Year and Day that were wont to be assigned unto such Persons being impleaded, when and from what Day of the Year going before unto another Day of the Year following, the Year and Day in a Leap Year ought to be taken and reckoned how long it was:

II. We therefore, willing that a Conformity be observed in this behalf every where within our Realm, and to avoid all Danger from such as be in Plea, have provided, and by the Counsel of our faithful Subjects have ordained, That, to take away from henceforth all Doubt and Ambiguity that might arise hereupon, the Day increasing in the Leap-Year shall be accounted for one Year, so that because of that Day none shall be prejudiced that is impleaded, but that it shall be taken and reckoned of the same month wherein it groweth; and that Day, and the Day next going before, shall be accounted for one Day. And therefore we do command you, that from henceforth you do cause this to be published afore you, and be observed. Witness myself at Westminster, &c .

Section II of the Calendar (New Style) Act 1750 (24 Geo. 2. c. 23) uses the word "bissextile" as a term for leap years.

Be it further enacted by the Authority aforesaid,

That the several Years of our Lord, 1800, 1900, 2100, 2200, 2300, or any other hundredth Years of our Lord, which shall happen in Time to come, except only every fourth hundredth [sic] Year of our Lord, whereof the Year of our Lord 2000 shall be the first, shall not be esteemed or taken to be Bissextile or Leap Years, but shall be taken to be common Years, consisting of 365 Days, and no more;

and that the Years of our Lord 2000, 2400, 2800, and every other fourth hundred Year of our Lord, from the said Year of our Lord 2000 inclusive, and also all other Years of our Lord, which by the present Supputation are esteemed to be Bissextile or Leap Years, shall for the future, and in all Times to come, be esteemed and taken to be Bissextile or Leap Years, consisting of 366 Days, in the same Sort and Manner as is now used with respect to every fourth Year of our Lord.
