= List of acts of the Parliament of England from 1514 =

This is a list of acts of the Parliament of England for the year 1514.

For acts passed during the period 1707–1800, see the list of acts of the Parliament of Great Britain. See also the list of acts of the Parliament of Scotland, and the list of acts of the Parliament of Ireland.

For acts passed from 1801 onwards, see the list of acts of the Parliament of the United Kingdom. For acts of the devolved parliaments and assemblies in the United Kingdom, see the list of acts of the Scottish Parliament, the list of acts of the Northern Ireland Assembly, and the list of acts and measures of Senedd Cymru; see also the list of acts of the Parliament of Northern Ireland.

For medieval statutes, etc. that are not considered to be acts of Parliament, see the list of English statutes.

See also the List of ordinances and acts of the Parliament of England, 1642–1660 for ordinances and acts passed by the Long Parliament and other bodies without royal assent, and which were not considered to be valid legislation following the Restoration in 1660.

The number shown after each act's title is its chapter number. Acts are cited using this number, preceded by the years of the reign during which the relevant parliamentary session was held; thus the Union with Ireland Act 1800 is cited as "39 & 40 Geo. 3. c. 67", meaning the 67th act passed during the session that started in the 39th year of the reign of George III and which finished in the 40th year of that reign. The modern convention is to use Arabic numerals in citations (thus "41 Geo. 3" rather than "41 Geo. III"). Acts of the last session of the Parliament of Great Britain and the first session of the Parliament of the United Kingdom are both cited as "41 Geo. 3".

Acts passed by the Parliament of England did not have a short title; however, some of these acts have subsequently been given a short title by acts of the Parliament of the United Kingdom, such as the Short Titles Act 1896 (59 & 60 Vict. c. 14).

Acts passed by the Parliament of England were deemed to have come into effect on the first day of the session in which they were passed. Because of this, the years given in the list below may in fact be the year before a particular act was passed.

== 6 Hen. 8 ==
The first session of the 3rd Parliament of King Henry VIII, which met from 5 February 1515 until 5 April 1515.

This session was also traditionally cited as 6 H. 8.

Note that cc. 19–25 were traditionally cited as private acts cc. 1–7 and that c. 26 was not included in traditional collections of acts.

Short title	Citation	Royal assent
Long title
Act of Apparel 1514 (repealed)	c. 1	5 April 1515
An Act of Apparel. (Repealed by Statute Law Revision Act 1863 (26 & 27 Vict. c. 125))
Archery Act 1514 (repealed)	c. 2	5 April 1515
An Act for Maintenance of Archery. (Repealed by Statute Law Revision Act 1863 (26 & 27 Vict. c. 125))
Artificers and Labourers Act 1514 (repealed)	c. 3	5 April 1515
An Act concerning Artificers and Labourers. (Repealed by Statute Law Revision Act 1863 (26 & 27 Vict. c. 125))
Proclamation Before Exigent, etc. Act 1514 (repealed)	c. 4	5 April 1515
An Act for Proclamations to be made before the Exigent be awarded into foreign Shires. (Repealed by Administration of Justice (Miscellaneous Provisions) Act 1938 (1 & 2 Geo. 6. c. 63))
Tillage Act 1514 (repealed)	c. 5	5 April 1515
An Act concerning pulling down of Towns. (Repealed by Statute Law Revision Act 1863 (26 & 27 Vict. c. 125))
Felons and Murderers Act 1514 (repealed)	c. 6	5 April 1515
An Act concerning Felons and Murderers. (Repealed by Administration of Justice (Miscellaneous Provisions) Act 1938 (1 & 2 Geo. 6. c. 63))
Thames Watermen Act 1514 (repealed)	c. 7	5 April 1515
An Act concerning Watermen on the Thames. (Repealed by Thames Watermen and Lightermen Act 1827 (7 & 8 Geo. 4. c. lxxv))
Cloths Act 1514 (repealed)	c. 8	5 April 1515
An Act concerning Cloths called White Straits. (Repealed by Woollen Manufacture Act 1809 (49 Geo. 3. c. 109))
Cloths (No. 2) Act 1514 (repealed)	c. 9	5 April 1515
An Act avoiding Deceits in making of Woollen Cloths. (Repealed by Woollen Manufacture Act 1809 (49 Geo. 3. c. 109))
Commissions of Sewers Act 1514 (repealed)	c. 10	5 April 1515
An Act concerning Commissions of Sewers. (Repealed by Statute Law Revision Act 1863 (26 & 27 Vict. c. 125))
Importation Act 1514 (repealed)	c. 11	5 April 1515
An Act concerning the bringing in of Bow-staves into this Realm. (Repealed by Statute Law Revision Act 1863 (26 & 27 Vict. c. 125))
Exportation Act 1514 (repealed)	c. 12	5 April 1515
An Act that Norfolk Wools be not carried out of this Realm. (Repealed by Statute Law Revision Act 1863 (26 & 27 Vict. c. 125))
Cross-bows, etc. Act 1514 (repealed)	c. 13	5 April 1515
An Act avoiding shooting in Cross Bows. (Repealed by Statute Law Revision Act 1863 (26 & 27 Vict. c. 125))
Taxation Act 1514 (repealed)	c. 14	5 April 1515
An Act concerning the King's Subsidy for Tonnage and Poundage. (Repealed by Statute Law Revision Act 1863 (26 & 27 Vict. c. 125))
Crown Grants Act 1514 (repealed)	c. 15	5 April 1515
An Act adnulling second Letters Patents during the King's Pleasure, making no Mention of the first Letters Patents. (Repealed by Crown Estate Act 1961 (9 & 10 Eliz. 2. c. 55))
Attendance in Parliament Act 1514 (repealed)	c. 16	5 April 1515
An Act that no Knights of Shires nor Burgesses depart before the End of the Parliament. (Repealed by Statute Law (Repeals) Act 1993 (c. 50))
Deepening River at Canterbury Act 1514 (repealed)	c. 17	5 April 1515
An Act concerning the River in Canterbury. (Repealed by County of Kent Act 1981 (c. xviii))
Bristol Act 1514 (repealed)	c. 18	5 April 1515
An Act concerning Under-Sheriffs in Bristol. (Repealed by Statute Law Revision Act 1948 (11 & 12 Geo. 6. c. 62))
Grant to Duke of Norfolk Act 1514 (repealed)	c. 19 (Note: This is the citation in The Statutes of the Realm.); 6 Hen. 8. c. 1 Pr. (Note: This is the citation in The Statutes at Large.)	5 April 1515
An Act for confirmation of the King's grant made to the duke of Norfolk. (Repealed by Statute Law (Repeals) Act 1978 (c. 45))
Letters Patent to Duke of Suffolk Act 1514 (repealed)	c. 20; 6 Hen. 8. c. 2 Pr.	5 April 1515
An Act for confirmation of letters patents made by the King to the duke of Suffolk. (Repealed by Statute Law (Repeals) Act 1978 (c. 45))
Restitution of Edward Belnap Knight Act 1514 (repealed)	c. 21; 6 Hen. 8. c. 3 Pr.	5 April 1515
The Restitucion of Edward Belknap Knight. (Repealed by Statute Law (Repeals) Act 1977 (c. 18))
Restitution of John White Clerk Act 1514 (repealed)	c. 22; 6 Hen. 8. c. 4 Pr.	5 April 1515
The Restitucion of John White Clerk. (Repealed by Statute Law (Repeals) Act 1977 (c. 18))
Assurance of Manor of Hanworth Act 1514 (repealed)	c. 23; 6 Hen. 8. c. 5 Pr.	5 April 1515
An Act for the assurance of the manors of Hanworth, and other lands, to the King and his successors. (Repealed by Statute Law (Repeals) Act 1978 (c. 45))
Surveyors of Crown Lands, etc. Act 1514 (repealed)	c. 24; 6 Hen. 8. c. 6 Pr.	5 April 1515
An Act concerning the King's general surveyors. (Repealed by King's Revenues Act 1515 (7 Hen. 8. c. 7))
Resumption of Offices, Annuities, etc. Act 1514 (repealed)	c. 25; 6 Hen. 8. c. 7 Pr.	5 April 1515
The Resumpcion. (Repealed by Statute Law Revision Act 1948 (11 & 12 Geo. 6. c. 62))
Subsidy Act 1514 (repealed)	c. 26 (Note: This act was not included in The Statutes at Large.)	5 April 1515
The Subsidye. (Repealed by Statute Law Revision Act 1863 (26 & 27 Vict. c. 125))

=== Sources ===
- "6° Hen. VIII". The Statutes of the Realm. Vol. 3: 1509 to 1547. pp. 121–175 – via HathiTrust.
- "6° Hen. VIII". The Statutes of the Realm. Vol. 3: 1509 to 1547. pp. 121–175 – via Google Books.
- "Anno sexto Henrici VIII". The Statutes at Large. Vol. 4 - 1 Richard III to 31 Henry VIII - 1483-4 to 1539. pp. 133–143 – via Internet Archive.
- "Anno sexto Henrici VIII". The Statutes at Large. Vol. 4 - 1 Richard III to 31 Henry VIII - 1483-4 to 1539. pp. 133–143 – via Internet Archive.
- "Anno sexto Henrici VIII". The Statutes at Large. Vol. 4 - 1 Richard III to 31 Henry VIII - 1483-4 to 1539. pp. 133–143 – via Internet Archive.
- Journal of the House of Lords. Vol. 1: 1509-1577. London: His Majesty's Stationery Office. 1830 – via British History Online.
- Chronological Table of and Index to the Statutes. Vol. 1: To the End of the Session 59 Vict. Sess. 2 (1895) (13th ed.). London: Her Majesty's Stationery Office. 1896. pp. 44–45 – via Google Books.
- Chronological Table of the Statutes: Covering the Period from 1235 to the End of 1971. London: Her Majesty's Stationery Office. 1972. pp. 39–40. ISBN 978-0-11-840096-1 – via Google Books.
- "Acts of the English Parliament from 1514". legislation.gov.uk. The National Archives.

== See also ==
- List of acts of the Parliament of England
