= King's Revenues Act 1515 =

Act of the Parliament of England

- Act of Parliament
- Parliament of England
- Long title: The Kynges Revenues.
- Citation: 7 Hen. 8. c. 7 (Note: This is the citation in The Statutes of the Realm.); 7 Hen. 8. c. 3 Pr. (Note: This is the citation in The Statutes at Large.)
- Territorial extent: England and Wales

Dates
- Royal assent: 22 December 1515
- Commencement: 12 November 1515 (Note: Start of session.)
- Repealed: 28 July 1863

Other legislation
- Repeals/revokes: Surveyors of Crown Lands, etc. Act 1514
- Repealed by: Statute Law Revision Act 1863

Status: Repealed

Text of statute as originally enacted

The King's Revenues Act 1515 (7 Hen. 8. c. 7) was an act of the Parliament of England.

== Provisions ==
Section 38 of the act repealed the Surveyors of Crown Lands, etc. Act 1514 (6 Hen. 8. c. 24).

== Subsequent developments ==
The whole act was repealed by section 1 of, and the schedule to, the Statute Law Revision Act 1863 (26 & 27 Vict. c. 125), which came into force on 28 July 1863.
