= Statute of Ireland concerning Coparceners =

Act of the Parliament of England

Statutum Hibernie de Coheredibus
- Act of Parliament
- Parliament of England
- Long title: None
- Citation: 20 Hen. 3 (Note: cited as 14 Hen. 3 in The Statutes at Large, which gives the year as 1229.)
- Territorial extent: England and Wales; Ireland

Dates
- Royal assent: 1235 by Henry III of England
- Commencement: 23 January 1236
- Repealed: England and Wales: 28 July 1863; Ireland: 10 August 1872

Other legislation
- Repealed by: England and Wales: Statute Law Revision Act 1863; Ireland: Statute Law (Ireland) Revision Act 1872

Status: Repealed

Text of statute as originally enacted

The Statute of Ireland concerning Coparceners (Latin: Statutum Hibernie de Coheredibus, or Stat. Hib. de Coher.) (20 Hen. 3), was an English statute made by Henry III. It was traditionally dated from 1229, in the 14th year of Henry III's reign, but since the publication of The Statutes of the Realm it has been treated as dating from 1235 (in the 20th year of Henry III's reign).

"In that year [1229] [...] happened the great cause of Coparceners, for the decision whereof the King sent a writ, which in the printed statutes is called Statutum Hiberniæ"
—Collins's Peerage of England, 1812

Although traditionally printed in collections of statutes, including in the official publication The Statutes of the Realm, the Statute of Ireland concerning Coparceners is not in the form of a statute, but rather of a letter from the King to the Justice of Ireland confirming existing English practices on inheritance.

Coparceners are persons who inherit property equally.

== Subsequent developments ==
The act was extended to Ireland by Poynings' Law 1495 (10 Hen. 7. c. 22 (I)).

The whole act was repealed for England and Wales by section 1 of, and the schedule to, the Statute Law Revision Act 1863 (26 & 27 Vict. c. 125), which came into force on 28 July 1863.

The whole act was repealed for Ireland by section 1 of, and the schedule to, the Statute Law (Ireland) Revision Act 1872 (35 & 36 Vict. c. 98), which came into force on 10 August 1872.
