= Statute of Merton =

1235 act of the Parliament of England

- Act of Parliament
- Parliament of England
- Long title: None
- Citation: 20 Hen. 3
- Introduced by: Barons of the Peerage of England (Note: The division of Parliament into the House of Lords and the House of Commons would not occur until 1341; Parliament met as a unitary body at the time of the passage of the Statute of Merton.)

Dates
- Royal assent: 1235 by Henry III of England
- Commencement: 1235
- Repealed: 18 December 1953

Other legislation
- Repealed by: Statute Law Revision Act 1863; Statute Law Revision and Civil Procedure Act 1881; Statute Law (Ireland) Revision Act 1872; Statute Law Revision Act 1950; Statute Law Revision Act 1953
- Relates to: Magna Carta

Status: Repealed

Text of statute as originally enacted

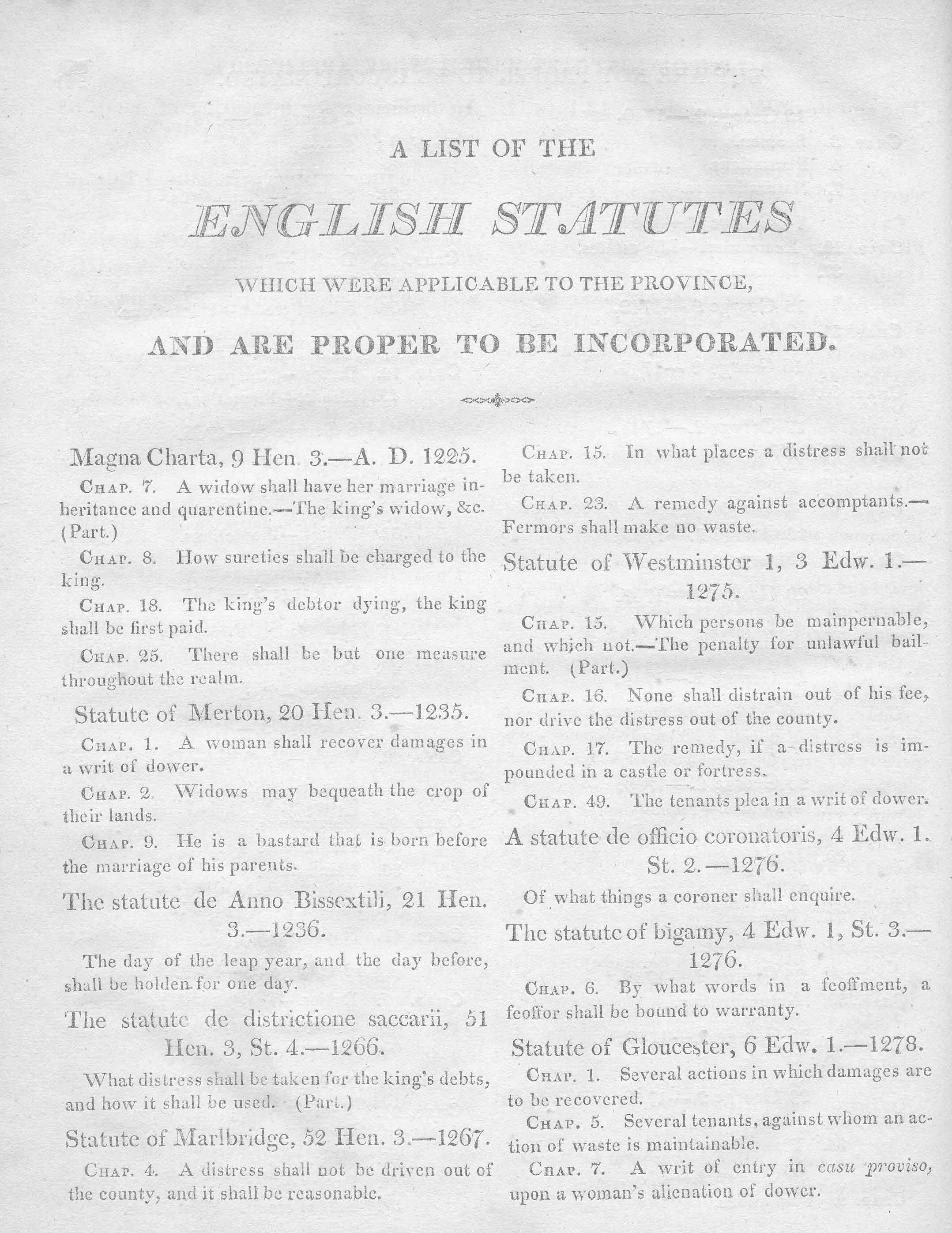
Kilty's English Statutes, 1811; Volume 143, Page 262. Extracts from the Statute of Merton.

The Statute of Merton or Provisions of Merton (Latin: Provisiones de Merton, or Stat. Merton) (20 Hen. 3), sometimes also known as the Ancient Statute of Merton, was a statute passed by the Parliament of England in 1235 during the reign of Henry III. It is considered to be the first English statute, and is printed as the first statute in The Statutes of the Realm. Containing 11 chapters, the terms of the statute were agreed at Merton between Henry and the barons of England in 1235. It was another instance, along with Magna Carta twenty years previously, of the struggle between the barons and the king to limit the latter's rights.

Amongst its provisions, the statute allowed a Lord of the manor to enclose common land provided that sufficient pasture remained for his tenants, and set out when and how manorial lords could assert rights over waste land, woods, and pastures against their tenants. It quickly became a basis for English common law, developing and clarifying legal concepts of ownership, and was one of the English statutes carried over into the law of the Lordship of Ireland.

Having long been disused, it was revived under Duke of Northumberland John Dudley in January 1550 to enable lords to enclose their land at their own discretion, out of keeping with the traditional Tudor anti-enclosure attitude.

The statute also dealt with illegitimacy – stating that "He is a bastard that is born before the marriage of his parents". It also dealt with women's rights – dowries ("A woman shall recover damages in a writ of dower"), and widows' right to bequeath land ("Widows may bequeath the crop of their lands").

== Chapters ==
The act was extended to Ireland by Poynings' Law 1495 (10 Hen. 7. c. 22 (I)).

Chapter	Short title	Subject	Repealing act (if any)		
Chapter	Short title	Subject	England & Wales	Northern Ireland	Ireland
1	Damages on Writ Dower Act 1235	Damages on writ of dower	Statute Law Revision Act 1863 (26 & 27 Vict. c. 125)	Statute Law Revision Act 1950 (14 Geo. 6. c. 6)	Succession Act 1965 (Note: By section 8 of, and part I of schedule 2, subject to the savings in section 9.)
2	Widow's Bequest of Corn on Her Land Act 1235	Widow's bequest of corn on her land	Statute Law Revision Act 1948 (11 & 12 Geo. 6. c. 62)		Succession Act 1965 (Note: By section 8 of, and part I of schedule 2, subject to the savings in section 9.)
3	None	Redisseisin	Statute Law Revision Act 1863 (26 & 27 Vict. c. 125)	Statute Law (Ireland) Revision Act 1872 (35 & 36 Vict. c. 98)	
4	Commons Act 1236	Commons	Statute Law Revision Act 1953 (2 & 3 Eliz. 2. c. 5)		Statute Law Revision Act 1983
5	None	Usury	Statute Law Revision Act 1863 (26 & 27 Vict. c. 125)	Statute Law (Ireland) Revision Act 1872 (35 & 36 Vict. c. 98)	
6	None	Wardship	Statute Law Revision Act 1863 (26 & 27 Vict. c. 125)	Statute Law (Ireland) Revision Act 1872 (35 & 36 Vict. c. 98)	
7	None	Wardship	Statute Law Revision Act 1863 (26 & 27 Vict. c. 125)	Statute Law (Ireland) Revision Act 1872 (35 & 36 Vict. c. 98)	
8	None	Limitation of writs	Statute Law Revision Act 1863 (26 & 27 Vict. c. 125)	Statute Law (Ireland) Revision Act 1872 (35 & 36 Vict. c. 98)	
9	None	Special bastardy	Statute Law Revision Act 1948 (11 & 12 Geo. 6. c. 62)		Succession Act 1965 (Note: By section 8 of, and part I of schedule 2, subject to the savings in section 9.)
10	None	Attorneys in county courts	Civil Procedure Acts Repeal Act 1879 (42 & 43 Vict. c. 59)		
11	None	Trespassers in parks	Statute Law Revision Act 1863 (26 & 27 Vict. c. 125)	Statute Law (Ireland) Revision Act 1872 (35 & 36 Vict. c. 98)	

The whole act was repealed for the Republic of Ireland by section 1 of, and part 2 of the schedule to, the Statute Law Revision Act 1983, which came into force on 16 May 1983.

== Dating and nomenclature ==
The statute was passed in 1235 and is named after Merton, where it was passed. It is considered the first English statute. Magna Carta was initially enacted in 1215 and is counted as a statute by some sources as early as 1225; however, The Statutes of the Realm does not consider it as a statute prior to a 1297 confirmation. The Charter of the Forest had been passed in 1217 but is not considered a statute.

== See also ==
- List of English statutes
- Henry de Bracton
