= List of acts of the Parliament of England from 1491 =

This is a list of acts of the Parliament of England for the year 1491.

For acts passed during the period 1707–1800, see the list of acts of the Parliament of Great Britain. See also the list of acts of the Parliament of Scotland, and the list of acts of the Parliament of Ireland.

For acts passed from 1801 onwards, see the list of acts of the Parliament of the United Kingdom. For acts of the devolved parliaments and assemblies in the United Kingdom, see the list of acts of the Scottish Parliament, the list of acts of the Northern Ireland Assembly, and the list of acts and measures of Senedd Cymru; see also the list of acts of the Parliament of Northern Ireland.

For medieval statutes, etc. that are not considered to be acts of Parliament, see the list of English statutes.

See also the List of ordinances and acts of the Parliament of England, 1642–1660 for ordinances and acts passed by the Long Parliament and other bodies without royal assent, and which were not considered to be valid legislation following the Restoration in 1660.

The number shown after each act's title is its chapter number. Acts are cited using this number, preceded by the years of the reign during which the relevant parliamentary session was held; thus the Union with Ireland Act 1800 is cited as "39 & 40 Geo. 3. c. 67", meaning the 67th act passed during the session that started in the 39th year of the reign of George III and which finished in the 40th year of that reign. The modern convention is to use Arabic numerals in citations (thus "41 Geo. 3" rather than "41 Geo. III"). Acts of the last session of the Parliament of Great Britain and the first session of the Parliament of the United Kingdom are both cited as "41 Geo. 3".

Acts passed by the Parliament of England did not have a short title; however, some of these acts have subsequently been given a short title by acts of the Parliament of the United Kingdom, such as the Short Titles Act 1896 (59 & 60 Vict. c. 14).

Acts passed by the Parliament of England were deemed to have come into effect on the first day of the session in which they were passed. Because of this, the years given in the list below may in fact be the year before a particular act was passed.

== 7 Hen. 7 ==
The 4th Parliament of King Henry VII, which met from 17 October 1491 until 5 March 1492.

This session was also traditionally cited as 7 H. 7.

Note that c. 2 was traditionally cited as two separate acts (cc. 2, 3), cc. 3–7 were cited as cc. 4–8 respectively, cc. 8–23 were cited as private acts cc. 1–16, and c. 24 was not printed.

Short title	Citation	Royal assent
Long title
Soldiers Act 1491 (repealed)	7 Hen. 7. c. 1	5 March 1492
An Act agaynst Captaynes for not paying theire Soldyers their Wages, and agaynst Soldyers going from their Captaynes without licence. (Repealed for England and Wales by Statute Law Revision Act 1863 (26 & 27 Vict. c. 125))
Service in the King's Wars Act 1491 (repealed)	7 Hen. 7. c. 2 (Note: This is the citation in The Statutes of the Realm.); 7 Hen. 7. cc. 2, 3 (Note: This is the citation in The Statutes at Large.)	5 March 1492
An Act for dybers privileges to be graunted to persons being in the Kings Warrs. (Repealed for England and Wales by Statute Law Revision Act 1863 (26 & 27 Vict. c. 125))
Weights and Measures Act 1491 (repealed)	7 Hen. 7. c. 3; 7 Hen. 7. c. 4	5 March 1492
An Act for Waights and Measures. (Repealed for England and Wales by Statute Law Revision Act 1863 (26 & 27 Vict. c. 125))
Challenge of Riens Deyns le Gard in London Abolished Act 1491 (repealed)	7 Hen. 7. c. 4; 7 Hen. 7. c. 5	5 March 1492
An Act that the challenge called Riens Deyns le gard be noe challenge. (Repealed by Statute Law Revision Act 1948 (11 & 12 Geo. 6. c. 62))
Abbots, Priors, etc. Act 1491 (repealed)	7 Hen. 7. c. 5; 7 Hen. 7. c. 6	5 March 1492
An Acte that Abbotts & Pryors shall paye such quinzime & disme as they ought to paye by an Act in the tyme of King Edw. the Fowerth. (Repealed for England and Wales by Statute Law Revision Act 1863 (26 & 27 Vict. c. 125))
Scots Act 1491 (repealed)	7 Hen. 7. c. 6; 7 Hen. 7. c. 7	5 March 1492
Contra Scotos. (Repealed for England and Wales by Statute Law Revision Act 1863 (26 & 27 Vict. c. 125))
Customs Act 1491 (repealed)	7 Hen. 7. c. 7; 7 Hen. 7. c. 8	5 March 1492
An Act to paye Custome for every butt of Malmesey. (Repealed for England and Wales by Statute Law Revision Act 1863 (26 & 27 Vict. c. 125))
Grants of Offices to Thos. Crofte Made Void Act 1491 (repealed)	7 Hen. 7. c. 8; 7 Hen. 7. c. 1 Pr.	5 March 1492
Crofte. (Repealed by Statute Law Revision Act 1948 (11 & 12 Geo. 6. c. 62))
Fish Act 1491 (repealed)	7 Hen. 7. c. 9; 7 Hen. 7. c. 2 Pr.	5 March 1492
Orford. (Repealed by Sea Fisheries Act 1868 (31 & 32 Vict. c. 45))
Outlawry in Lancashire Act 1491 (repealed)	7 Hen. 7. c. 10; 7 Hen. 7. c. 3 Pr.	5 March 1492
An Acte that noe persons outlawed within the County of Lancaster should forfeyt any of his lands or goods in any other Shire but in the same Shire. (Repealed for England and Wales by Outlawry in Lancashire (No. 2) Act 1491 (7 Hen. 7. c. 24) and for Ireland by Statute Law Revision Act 1872 (35 & 36 Vict. c. 63))
Taxation Act 1491 (repealed)	7 Hen. 7. c. 11; 7 Hen. 7. c. 4 Pr.	5 March 1492
Conc̃. xv^{me}. (Repealed for England and Wales by Statute Law Revision Act 1863 (26 & 27 Vict. c. 125))
Feoffments made by the King Act 1491 (repealed)	7 Hen. 7. c. 12; 7 Hen. 7. c. 5 Pr.	5 March 1492
De Feoffamento Regis. (Repealed by Statute Law Revision Act 1948 (11 & 12 Geo. 6. c. 62))
Letters Patent to the Queen Act 1491 (repealed)	7 Hen. 7. c. 13; 7 Hen. 7. c. 6 Pr.	5 March 1492
Pro Regina. (Repealed by Statute Law Revision Act 1948 (11 & 12 Geo. 6. c. 62))
Barking Abbey Payments to Havering Manor Act 1491 (repealed)	7 Hen. 7. c. 14; 7 Hen. 7. c. 7 Pr.	5 March 1492
An Act to make the somme of fyve markes payable by the Abbas & Covent of Barkinge to be parcell of the Manner of Havering. (Repealed by Statute Law Revision Act 1948 (11 & 12 Geo. 6. c. 62))
Countess of Richmond and Derby Act 1491 (repealed)	7 Hen. 7. c. 15; 7 Hen. 7. c. 8 Pr.	5 March 1492
Pro Comitissa Richemond & Derby. (Repealed by Statute Law Revision Act 1948 (11 & 12 Geo. 6. c. 62))
Restitution of Earl of Surrey Act 1491 (repealed)	7 Hen. 7. c. 16; 7 Hen. 7. c. 9 Pr.	5 March 1492
Pro Comite Surr. (Repealed by Statute Law (Repeals) Act 1977 (c. 18))
Viscount Wells and Wife Act 1491 (repealed)	7 Hen. 7. c. 17; 7 Hen. 7. c. 10 Pr.	5 March 1492
Pro Vicecomite Welles & Uxore ejus. (Repealed by Statute Law Revision Act 1948 (11 & 12 Geo. 6. c. 62))
Lord de la Warr Act 1491 (repealed)	7 Hen. 7. c. 18; 7 Hen. 7. c. 11 Pr.	5 March 1492
Pro Domino la Warre. (Repealed by Statute Law Revision Act 1948 (11 & 12 Geo. 6. c. 62))
Prior of Christchurch Act 1491 (repealed)	7 Hen. 7. c. 19; 7 Hen. 7. c. 12 Pr.	5 March 1492
Pro Priore Ecclie Xpi Cantuar. (Repealed by Statute Law (Repeals) Act 1977 (c. 18))
Sir Thomas Lovell Act 1491 (repealed)	7 Hen. 7. c. 20; 7 Hen. 7. c. 13 Pr.	5 March 1492
Pro Thoma Lovell Milite. (Repealed by Statute Law Revision Act 1948 (11 & 12 Geo. 6. c. 62))
Hugh Johnson and Wife Act 1491 (repealed)	7 Hen. 7. c. 21; 7 Hen. 7. c. 14 Pr.	5 March 1492
Pro Hugone Johnson & Johanna uxore ejus. (Repealed by Statute Law Revision Act 1948 (11 & 12 Geo. 6. c. 62))
Attainder of John Hayes Act 1491 (repealed)	7 Hen. 7. c. 22; 7 Hen. 7. c. 15 Pr.	5 March 1492
Convictio Johannis Hayes. (Repealed by Statute Law Revision Act 1948 (11 & 12 Geo. 6. c. 62))
Attainder of Robt. Chamberlaine and Ric. White Act 1491 (repealed)	7 Hen. 7. c. 23; 7 Hen. 7. c. 16 Pr.	5 March 1492
Attincta Roberti Chamberleyn Militis. (Repealed by Statute Law Revision Act 1948 (11 & 12 Geo. 6. c. 62))
Outlawry in Lancashire (No. 2) Act 1491 (repealed)	7 Hen. 7. c. 24 (Note: This act was not included in The Statutes at Large.)	5 March 1492
An Act for the County Palentyne of Lancaster. (Repealed for England and Wales by Statute Law Revision Act 1863 (26 & 27 Vict. c. 125) and for Ireland by Statute Law Revision Act 1872 (35 & 36 Vict. c. 63))

=== Sources ===
- "7° Hen. VII.". The Statutes of the Realm. Vol. 2: 1377 to 1509. pp. 549–567 – via HathiTrust.
- "Anno septimo Henrici VII". The Statutes at Large. Vol. 4 - 1 Richard III to 31 Henry VIII - 1483-4 to 1539. pp. 51–54 – via Internet Archive.
- "Anno septimo Henrici VII". The Statutes at Large. Vol. 4 - 1 Richard III to 31 Henry VIII - 1483-4 to 1539. pp. 51–54 – via Internet Archive.
- "Anno septimo Henrici VII". The Statutes at Large. Vol. 4 - 1 Richard III to 31 Henry VIII - 1483-4 to 1539. pp. 51–54 – via Internet Archive.
- Chronological Table of and Index to the Statutes. Vol. 1: To the End of the Session 59 Vict. Sess. 2 (1895) (13th ed.). London: Her Majesty's Stationery Office. 1896. pp. 41–42 – via Google Books.
- Chronological Table of the Statutes: Covering the Period from 1235 to the End of 1971. London: Her Majesty's Stationery Office. 1972. pp. 35–36. ISBN 978-0-11-840096-1 – via Google Books.

== See also ==
- List of acts of the Parliament of England
