= Curtesy Act =

1226 English legislation on life tenure

- Act of Parliament
- Parliament of England
- Citation: 11 Hen. 3
- Territorial extent: England and Wales; Ireland

Dates
- Repealed: 1965 (in Ireland)

Status: Repealed

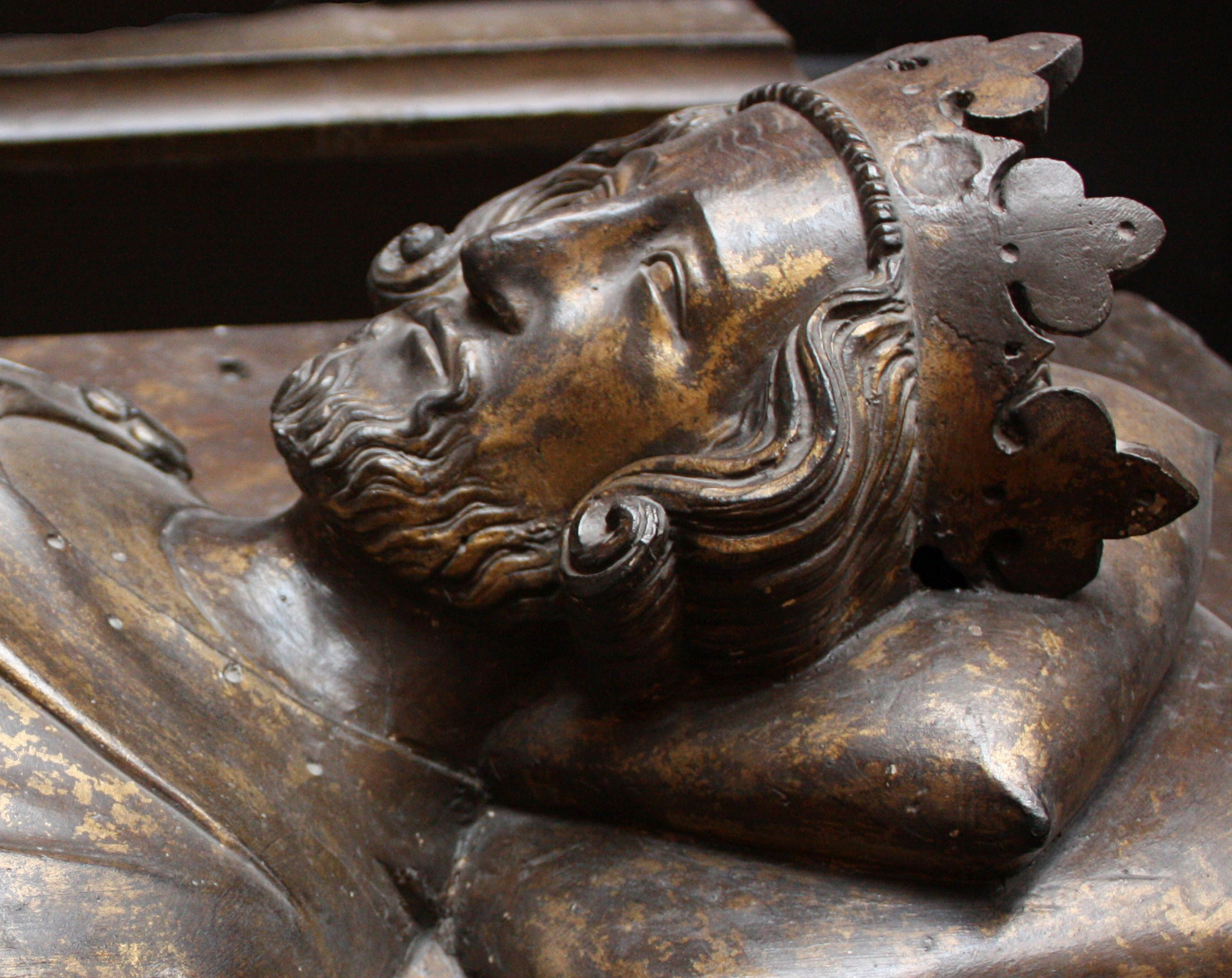
Effigy of Henry III, during whose reign the Curtesy Act was passed.

The Curtesy Act 1226 (11 Hen. 3) was an act of the Parliament of England passed in 1226. It governed courtesy tenure, i.e. the life interest which a widower may claim in the lands of his deceased wife.

In the Republic of Ireland, it was assigned the short title in 1962, shortly before it was repealed by the Succession Act 1965.
