= List of acts of the Parliament of England from 1566 =

This is a list of acts of the Parliament of England for the year 1566.

For acts passed during the period 1707–1800, see the list of acts of the Parliament of Great Britain. See also the list of acts of the Parliament of Scotland, and the list of acts of the Parliament of Ireland.

For acts passed from 1801 onwards, see the list of acts of the Parliament of the United Kingdom. For acts of the devolved parliaments and assemblies in the United Kingdom, see the list of acts of the Scottish Parliament, the list of acts of the Northern Ireland Assembly, and the list of acts and measures of Senedd Cymru; see also the list of acts of the Parliament of Northern Ireland.

For medieval statutes, etc. that are not considered to be acts of Parliament, see the list of English statutes.

See also the List of ordinances and acts of the Parliament of England, 1642–1660 for ordinances and acts passed by the Long Parliament and other bodies without royal assent, and which were not considered to be valid legislation following the Restoration in 1660.

The number shown after each act's title is its chapter number. Acts are cited using this number, preceded by the years of the reign during which the relevant parliamentary session was held; thus the Union with Ireland Act 1800 is cited as "39 & 40 Geo. 3. c. 67", meaning the 67th act passed during the session that started in the 39th year of the reign of George III and which finished in the 40th year of that reign. The modern convention is to use Arabic numerals in citations (thus "41 Geo. 3" rather than "41 Geo. III"). Acts of the last session of the Parliament of Great Britain and the first session of the Parliament of the United Kingdom are both cited as "41 Geo. 3".

Acts passed by the Parliament of England did not have a short title; however, some of these acts have subsequently been given a short title by acts of the Parliament of the United Kingdom, such as the Short Titles Act 1896 (59 & 60 Vict. c. 14).

Acts passed by the Parliament of England were deemed to have come into effect on the first day of the session in which they were passed. Because of this, the years given in the list below may in fact be the year before a particular act was passed.

== 8 Eliz. 1 ==
The second session of the 2nd Parliament of Queen Elizabeth I, which met from 30 September 1566 until 2 January 1567.

This session was traditionally cited as 8 Eliz., 8 Elz. or 8 El.

=== Public acts ===
Short title	Citation	Royal assent
Long title
Bishops Act 1566 (repealed)	8 Eliz. 1. c. 1	2 January 1567
An Act, declaring the Manner of making and consecrating of the Archbishops and Bishops of this Realm to be good, lawful, and perfect. (Repealed by Statute Law Revision Act 1863 (26 & 27 Vict. c. 125))
Defendant's Recovery of Costs Act 1566 (repealed)	8 Eliz. 1. c. 2	2 January 1567
An Act, whereby the Defendant may recover his Costs, being wrongfully vexed. (Repealed by Administration of Justice Act 1925 (15 & 16 Geo. 5. c. 28))
Exportation Act 1566 (repealed)	8 Eliz. 1. c. 3	2 January 1567
An Act against carrying over Sea Rams, Lambs, and other Sheep, alive. (Repealed by Repeal of Acts Concerning Importation Act 1822 (3 Geo. 4. c. 41))
Benefit of Clergy Act 1566 (repealed)	8 Eliz. 1. c. 4	2 January 1567
An Act to take away the Benefit of Clergy from certain Felonious Offenders. (Repealed for England and Wales by Criminal Statutes Repeal Act 1827 (7 & 8 Geo. 4. c. 27) and for India by Criminal Law (India) Act 1828 (9 Geo. 4. c. 74))
Judgment of Delegates Act 1566 or the Privy Council Appeals Act 1566 (repealed)	8 Eliz. 1. c. 5	2 January 1567
An Act for the Abridgment of Appeals, in Suits of Civil and Marine Causes. (Repealed by Privy Council Appeals Act 1832 (2 & 3 Will. 4. c. 92))
Exportation (No. 2) Act 1566 (repealed)	8 Eliz. 1. c. 6	2 January 1567
An Act, touching Cloth-workers, and Cloths ready wrought, to be shipped over the Sea. (Repealed by Repeal of Acts Concerning Importation Act 1822 (3 Geo. 4. c. 41))
Drapers, etc. (Shrewsbury) Act 1566 (repealed)	8 Eliz. 1. c. 7	2 January 1567
An Act touching Drapers, Cottoners, and Frizers, in the Town of Shrewisburye. (Repealed by Statute Law Revision Act 1863 (26 & 27 Vict. c. 125))
Horses Act 1566 (repealed)	8 Eliz. 1. c. 8	2 January 1567
An Act for the Repeal of a Brach of a Statute, made 32° Henrici Octavi, (Note: Horses Act 1540 (32 Hen. 8. c. 13)) for the Stature of Horses within the Isle of Elye, and other Places confining thereunto. (Repealed by Repeal of Obsolete Statutes Act 1856 (19 & 20 Vict. c. 64))
Prices of Barrels, etc. Act 1566 (repealed)	8 Eliz. 1. c. 9	2 January 1567
An Act to repeal a Branch of a Statute, made in Anno 23° Henrici Octavi, (Note: Brewers and Coopers Act 1531 (23 Hen. 8. c. 4)) touching the Prices of Barrels and Kilderkins. (Repealed by Repeal of Obsolete Statutes Act 1856 (19 & 20 Vict. c. 64))
Bows Act 1566 (repealed)	8 Eliz. 1. c. 10	2 January 1567
An Act for Bowyers and the Prices of Bows. (Repealed by Repeal of Obsolete Statutes Act 1856 (19 & 20 Vict. c. 64))
Hats and Caps Act 1566 (repealed)	8 Eliz. 1. c. 11	2 January 1567
An Act for true making of Hats and Caps. (Repealed by Manufacture of Hats Act 1776 (17 Geo. 3. c. 55))
Cloths (Lancashire) Act 1566 (repealed)	8 Eliz. 1. c. 12	2 January 1567
An Act for the Alnagers Fees in Lancashire, and for Length, Breadth, and Weight of Cottons, Frizes, and Rugs. (Repealed by Repeal of Obsolete Statutes Act 1856 (19 & 20 Vict. c. 64))
Sea Marks Act 1566 (repealed)	8 Eliz. 1. c. 13	2 January 1567
An Act concerning Sea-marks and Mariners. (Repealed by Thames Conservancy Act 1864 (27 & 28 Vict. c. 113))
Leather Act 1566 (repealed)	8 Eliz. 1. c. 14	2 January 1567
An Act touching the Transporting of Tawed Leather, made of Sheep-Skins and Lamb-Skins. (Repealed by Statute Law Revision Act 1863 (26 & 27 Vict. c. 125))
Preservation of Grain Act 1566 (repealed)	8 Eliz. 1. c. 15	2 January 1567
An Act for Preservation of Corn. (Repealed by Statute Law Revision Act 1863 (26 & 27 Vict. c. 125))
Sheriffs Act 1566 (repealed)	8 Eliz. 1. c. 16	2 January 1567
An Act, That in divers Counties there shall be but one Sheriff in one County. (Repealed by Statute Law Revision Act 1863 (26 & 27 Vict. c. 125))
Taxation Act 1566 (repealed)	8 Eliz. 1. c. 17	2 January 1567
An Act for Confirmation of a Subsidy granted by the Clergy. (Repealed by Statute Law Revision Act 1863 (26 & 27 Vict. c. 125))
Taxation (No. 2) Act 1566 (repealed)	8 Eliz. 1. c. 18	2 January 1567
An Act of a Fifteenth and Tenth and Subsidy, granted by the Temporalty. (Repealed by Statute Law Revision Act 1863 (26 & 27 Vict. c. 125))
Act of General Pardon Act 1566 (repealed)	8 Eliz. 1. c. 19	2 January 1567
An Act of the Queen's Majesty's Free and General Pardon. (Repealed by Statute Law Revision Act 1863 (26 & 27 Vict. c. 125))
Criminal Law Act 1566 (repealed)	8 Eliz. 1. c. 20	2 January 1567
An Act for the Repeal of a Branch of a Statute, made 26° Henrici Octavi, (Note: Marches in Wales Act 1534 (26 Hen. 8. c. 6)) touching Trial of Offences in the County of Merioneth, in North Wales. (Repealed by Statute Law Revision Act 1863 (26 & 27 Vict. c. 125))
Alum and Copperas Patent Act 1566 (repealed)	8 Eliz. 1. c. 21 (Note: This is the citation in The Statutes of the Realm.); 8 Eliz. 1. c. 4 Pr. (Note: This is the citation in The Statutes at Large.)	2 January 1567
An Acte confirmynge the Quenes Majesties letters Patentes concernyng the makinge of Allome and Copras within this Realme and other her Highnes Domynions. (Repealed by Statute Law Revision Act 1948 (11 & 12 Geo. 6. c. 62))
Salt Patent Act 1566 (repealed)	8 Eliz. 1. c. 22; 8 Eliz. 1. c. 13 Pr.	2 January 1567
An Acte for making of Salte within the Quenes Majesties Domynyons. (Repealed by Statute Law Revision Act 1948 (11 & 12 Geo. 6. c. 62))

=== Private acts ===
Short title	Citation	Royal assent
Long title
Merchant Adventurers' Act 1566	8 Eliz. 1. c. 1 Pr.	2 January 1567
An Act for the Corporation of Merchants Adventurers for the discovering of New Trades.
St. Bartholomew's Hospital Gloucester (Letters Patent) Act 1566	8 Eliz. 1. c. 2 Pr.	2 January 1567
An Act for the Confirmation of Letters Patents made for the Hospital of St. Bartylmewes in Gloucester.
Bristol Merchant Adventurers Act 1566	8 Eliz. 1. c. 3 Pr.	2 January 1567
An Act for Confirmation of Letters Patents granted to the Merchants Adventurers of the City of Brystowe.
Plumstead Marsh Inclosure and Drainage Act 1566	8 Eliz. 1. c. 4 Pr.	2 January 1567
An Act for the Inning of Plumsted Marsh, being surrounded.
Assurance of the Countess of Warwick's Jointure Act 1566	8 Eliz. 1. c. 5 Pr.	2 January 1567
An Act for the Assurance of the Countess of Warwyke's Jointure.
Assurance of Lady Cobham's Jointure Act 1566	8 Eliz. 1. c. 6 Pr.	2 January 1567
An Act for the Assurance of the Lady Cobham's Jointure.
Assurance of Lady Stafford's Jointure Act 1566	8 Eliz. 1. c. 7 Pr.	2 January 1567
An Act for the Assurance of the Lady Stafford's Jointure.
Denization of John Stafford Act 1566	8 Eliz. 1. c. 8 Pr.	2 January 1567
An Act to make John Stafforde Free Denizen, being born beyond the Sea.
Thomas Browne's Estate Act 1566	8 Eliz. 1. c. 9 Pr.	2 January 1567
An Act to alter the Nature of Gavel-kind in the Lands of Thomas Browne, Esquire.
York Town Clerk Act 1566	8 Eliz. 1. c. 10 Pr.	2 January 1567
An Act for the Town-Clerk of Yorke.
Paving of Kentish Street, Southwark Act 1566	8 Eliz. 1. c. 11 Pr.	2 January 1567
An Act for the Paving of Kentyshe-Street.
Battle Market Act 1566	8 Eliz. 1. c. 12 Pr.	2 January 1567
An Act for keeping of Thursday's Market at Battell, in the County of Sussex.

=== Sources ===
- "8° Eliz.". The Statutes of the Realm. Vol. 4 Part 1: 1547 to 1584. pp. 483–524 – via HathiTrust.
- Pickering, Danby, ed. (1763). "Anno octavo Elizabethæ". The Statutes at Large. Vol. 6: from the First Year of Queen Mary to the Thirty-fifth Year of Queen Elizabeth, inclusive. Cambridge: Joseph Bentham. pp. 228–256 – via Internet Archive.
- Pickering, Danby, ed. (1763). "Anno octavo Elizabethæ". The Statutes at Large. Vol. 6: from the First Year of Queen Mary to the Thirty-fifth Year of Queen Elizabeth, inclusive. Cambridge: Joseph Bentham. pp. 228–256 – via Internet Archive.
- Journal of the House of Commons. Vol. 1 – 1547-1629. His Majesty's Stationery Office. 1802 – via British History Online.
- Journal of the House of Lords. Vol. 1: 1509-1577. London: His Majesty's Stationery Office. 1830 – via British History Online.
- Chronological Table of and Index to the Statutes. Vol. 1: To the End of the Session 59 Vict. Sess. 2 (1895) (13th ed.). London: Her Majesty's Stationery Office. 1896. p. 60 – via Google Books.
- Chronological Table of the Statutes: Covering the Period from 1235 to the End of 1971. London: Her Majesty's Stationery Office. 1972. pp. 57–58. ISBN 978-0-11-840096-1 – via Google Books.
- "Chronological Tables of the Private and Personal Acts: Part 1 (1539–1601)". legislation.gov.uk. The National Archives.

== See also ==
- List of acts of the Parliament of England
