= Commons Act 1236 =

Act of the Parliament of England

Commons Act 1236 (Note: The citation of this act by this short title was authorised by section 5 of, and the second schedule to, the Statute Law Revision Act 1948. Due to the repeal of those provisions, it is now authorised by section 19(2) of the Interpretation Act 1978.)
- Act of Parliament
- Parliament of England
- Long title: Common and pasture by free-holders within great manners . . . (Note: These words are printed against this act in the second column of the second schedule to the Statute Law Revision Act 1948, which is headed "Title".)
- Citation: 20 Hen. 3. c. 4
- Territorial extent: England and Wales; Ireland

Dates
- Royal assent: 1236
- Commencement: 23 January 1236 (Note: Start of session.)
- Repealed: Northern Ireland: England and Wales: 18 December 1953

Other legislation
- Amended by: Statute Law Revision Act 1950
- Repealed by: Northern Ireland: Statute Law Revision Act 1950; England and Wales: Statute Law Revision Act 1953

Status: Repealed

Text of statute as originally enacted

The Commons Act 1236 (20 Hen. 3. c. 4) was an act of the Parliament of England. It was chapter 4 of the Statute of Merton (20 Hen. 3).

== Subsequent developments ==
The whole act was repealed for Northern Ireland by section 1(1) of, and the first schedule to, the Statute Law Revision Act 1950 (14 Geo. 6. c. 6), which came into force on 23 May 1950.

The whole act was repealed by section 1 of, and the first schedule to, the Statute Law Revision Act 1953 (2 & 3 Eliz. 2. c. 5), which came into force on 18 December 1953.

== See also ==
- Commons Act
