= List of acts of the Parliament of England from 1515 =

This is a list of acts of the Parliament of England for the year 1515.

For acts passed during the period 1707–1800, see the list of acts of the Parliament of Great Britain. See also the list of acts of the Parliament of Scotland, and the list of acts of the Parliament of Ireland.

For acts passed from 1801 onwards, see the list of acts of the Parliament of the United Kingdom. For acts of the devolved parliaments and assemblies in the United Kingdom, see the list of acts of the Scottish Parliament, the list of acts of the Northern Ireland Assembly, and the list of acts and measures of Senedd Cymru; see also the list of acts of the Parliament of Northern Ireland.

For medieval statutes, etc. that are not considered to be acts of Parliament, see the list of English statutes.

See also the List of ordinances and acts of the Parliament of England, 1642–1660 for ordinances and acts passed by the Long Parliament and other bodies without royal assent, and which were not considered to be valid legislation following the Restoration in 1660.

The number shown after each act's title is its chapter number. Acts are cited using this number, preceded by the years of the reign during which the relevant parliamentary session was held; thus the Union with Ireland Act 1800 is cited as "39 & 40 Geo. 3. c. 67", meaning the 67th act passed during the session that started in the 39th year of the reign of George III and which finished in the 40th year of that reign. The modern convention is to use Arabic numerals in citations (thus "41 Geo. 3" rather than "41 Geo. III"). Acts of the last session of the Parliament of Great Britain and the first session of the Parliament of the United Kingdom are both cited as "41 Geo. 3".

Acts passed by the Parliament of England did not have a short title; however, some of these acts have subsequently been given a short title by acts of the Parliament of the United Kingdom, such as the Short Titles Act 1896 (59 & 60 Vict. c. 14).

Acts passed by the Parliament of England were deemed to have come into effect on the first day of the session in which they were passed. Because of this, the years given in the list below may in fact be the year before a particular act was passed.

== 7 Hen. 8 ==
The second session of the 3rd Parliament of King Henry VIII, which met from 12 November 1515 until 22 December 1515.

This session was also traditionally cited as 7 H. 8.

Note that cc. 7–11 were traditionally cited as private acts cc. 3, 1, 2, 4, and 5 respectively.

Short title	Citation	Royal assent
Long title
Tillage Act 1515 (repealed)	7 Hen. 8. c. 1	22 December 1515
The Act avoiding pulling down of Towns. (Repealed by Continuance, etc. of Laws Act 1623 (21 Jas. 1. c. 28))
Navigation Act 1515 (repealed)	7 Hen. 8. c. 2	22 December 1515
An Act for Maintenance of the King's Navy. (Repealed by Statute Law Revision Act 1863 (26 & 27 Vict. c. 125))
Penal Actions Act 1515 (repealed)	7 Hen. 8. c. 3	22 December 1515
The Act for Penal Statutes and Actions popular. (Repealed by Common Informers Act 1588 (31 Eliz. 1. c. 5))
Avowries Act 1515 (repealed)	7 Hen. 8. c. 4	22 December 1515
The Act for Avowries. (Repealed by Statute Law Revision Act 1863 (26 & 27 Vict. c. 125))
Labourers Act 1515 (repealed)	7 Hen. 8. c. 5	22 December 1515
The Act for Labourers and Artificers within the City of London. (Repealed by Statute Law Revision Act 1863 (26 & 27 Vict. c. 125))
Apparel Act 1515 (repealed)	7 Hen. 8. c. 6	22 December 1515
The Act of Apparel. (Repealed by Statute Law Revision Act 1863 (26 & 27 Vict. c. 125))
King's Revenues Act 1515 (repealed)	7 Hen. 8. c. 7 (Note: This is the citation in The Statutes of the Realm.); 7 Hen. 8. c. 3 Pr. (Note: This is the citation in The Statutes at Large.)	22 December 1515
The Kynges Revenues. (Repealed by Statute Law Revision Act 1863 (26 & 27 Vict. c. 125))
French Queen's Jointure (on Marriage to Duke of Suffolk) Act 1515 (repealed)	7 Hen. 8. c. 8; 7 Hen. 8. c. 1 Pr.	22 December 1515
The French Quenes Joyntour. (Repealed by Statute Law Revision Act 1953 (2 & 3 Eliz. 2. c. 5))
Subsidy Act 1515 (repealed)	7 Hen. 8. c. 9; 7 Hen. 8. c. 2 Pr.	22 December 1515
An Act for a subsidy to be granted to the King. (Repealed by Statute Law Revision Act 1863 (26 & 27 Vict. c. 125))
Staple at Calais Act 1515 (repealed)	7 Hen. 8. c. 10; 7 Hen. 8. c. 4 Pr.	22 December 1515
An Acte for the Staple of Calice. (Repealed by Statute Law Revision Act 1863 (26 & 27 Vict. c. 125))
Act of General Pardon 1515 (repealed)	7 Hen. 8. c. 11; 7 Hen. 8. c. 5 Pr.	22 December 1515
The King's general pardon. (Repealed by Statute Law Revision Act 1863 (26 & 27 Vict. c. 125))

=== Sources ===
- "7° Hen. VIII". The Statutes of the Realm. Vol. 3: 1509 to 1547. pp. 122–205 – via HathiTrust.
- "7° Hen. VIII". The Statutes of the Realm. Vol. 3: 1509 to 1547. pp. 122–205 – via Google Books.
- "Anno septimo Henrici VIII". The Statutes at Large. Vol. 4 - 1 Richard III to 31 Henry VIII - 1483-4 to 1539. pp. 143–145 – via Internet Archive.
- "Anno septimo Henrici VIII". The Statutes at Large. Vol. 4 - 1 Richard III to 31 Henry VIII - 1483-4 to 1539. pp. 143–145 – via Internet Archive.
- "Anno septimo Henrici VIII". The Statutes at Large. Vol. 4 - 1 Richard III to 31 Henry VIII - 1483-4 to 1539. pp. 143–145 – via Internet Archive.
- Journal of the House of Lords. Vol. 1: 1509-1577. London: His Majesty's Stationery Office. 1830 – via British History Online.
- Chronological Table of and Index to the Statutes. Vol. 1: To the End of the Session 59 Vict. Sess. 2 (1895) (13th ed.). London: Her Majesty's Stationery Office. 1896. p. 45 – via Google Books.
- Chronological Table of the Statutes: Covering the Period from 1235 to the End of 1971. London: Her Majesty's Stationery Office. 1972. p. 40. ISBN 978-0-11-840096-1 – via Google Books.

== See also ==
- List of acts of the Parliament of England
