= The Statutes of the Realm =

Texts of English and British statutes

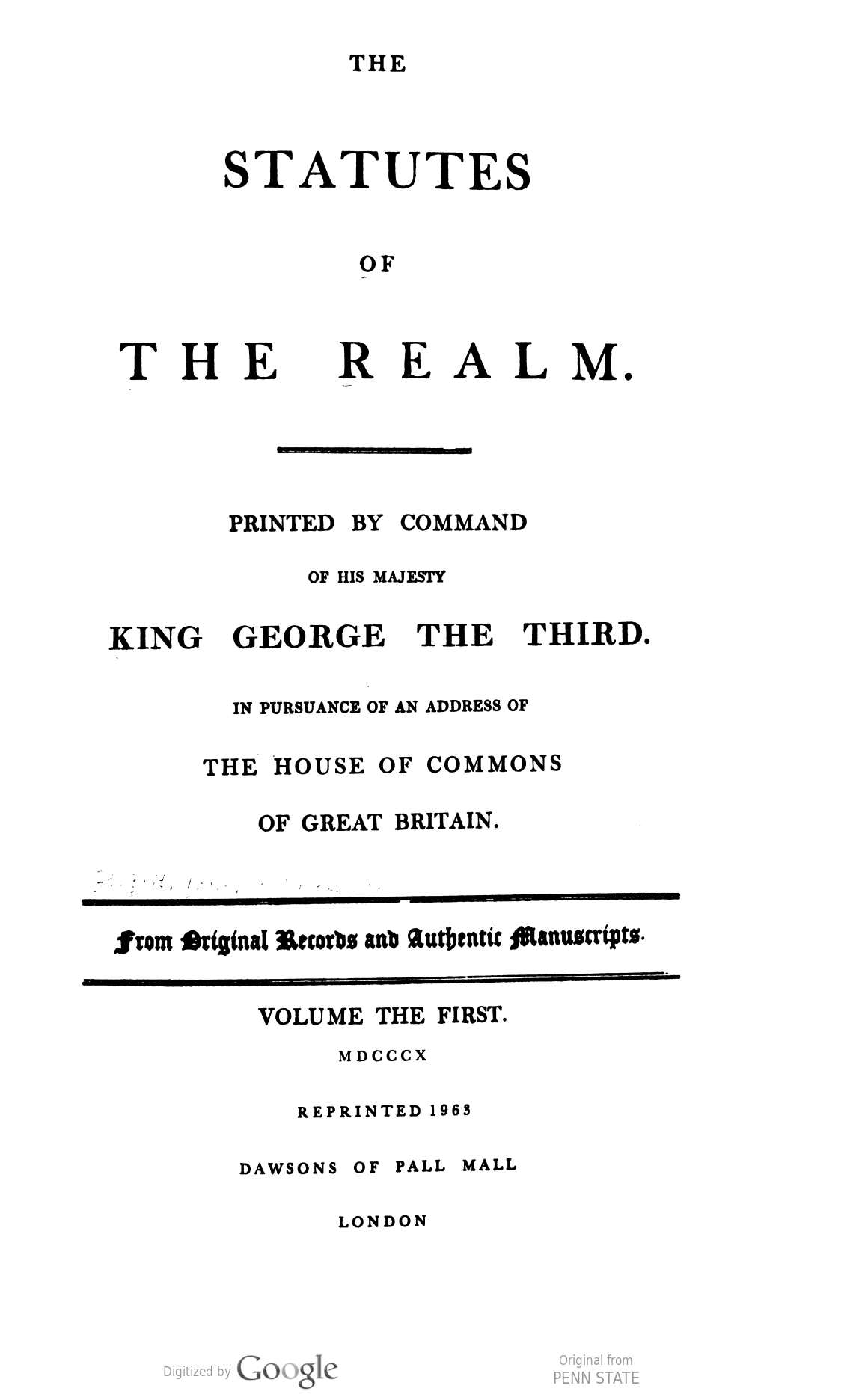
- Title page of the first volume
- Editor: Record Commission
- Author: Record Commission
- Language: English
- Genre: Law book
- Published: 1810 (First Volume) — 1828 (Eleventh Volume)
- Publication place: United Kingdom
- Text: The Statutes of the Realm at Wikisource

The Statutes of the Realm is an authoritative collection of acts of the Parliament of England from the earliest times to the Union of the Parliaments in 1707, and acts of the Parliament of Great Britain passed up to the death of Queen Anne in 1714.

For the purpose of citation, Statutes of the Realm may be abbreviated to Stat Realm.

The collection was published between 1810 and 1825 by the Record Commission as a series of nine volumes, with volume IV split into two separately bound parts, together with volumes containing an alphabetical index and a chronological index.

The collection contains all acts included in all earlier printed collections, together with a number of acts and translations which had not previously been printed. Also, in contrast with previous collections, the full text of each act is printed regardless of whether it was still in force at the time of publication. However, only the titles of private acts are printed from 1539 onwards. The text of each act is generally taken from the Statute Rolls, or later from its enrollment in Chancery, with missing text supplied from the original acts preserved in the Records of Parliament and other sources.

The first volume is prefaced with a comprehensive introduction explaining how and why The Statutes of the Realm was prepared. It also contains the text of various charters of liberties, from the reign of Henry I to that of Edward I of England.

The collection does not contain any acts passed by the old Parliament of Scotland or the old Parliament of Ireland, nor does it contain the ordinances and acts passed without royal authority in the mid-seventeenth century.

== Background ==
In the United Kingdom, acts of Parliament remain in force until expressly repealed. Blackstone's Commentaries on the Laws of England, published in the late 18th-century, raised questions about the system and structure of the common law and the poor drafting and disorder of the existing statute book.

On 12 April 1796, the Select Committee on Temporary Laws, Expired or Expiring was appointed to inspect and consider temporary laws, expired or expiring. The committee reported on 12 May 1796, found that there was no authentic and entire publication of the statutes, a problem compounded by the fact that many statutes had never been printed as well as the increased volume of the statute book. The committee recommended the "extreme importance" of obtaining a "complete and authentic publication of the statutes".

The Parliament of the United Kingdom, formed in 1800, following the Acts of Union 1800 devoted much attention to the consolidation of public records. On 18 February 1800, the Select Committee on the State of Public Records was appointed to inquire into the state of public records in England, Scotland and Ireland. The committee reported on 4 July 1800, resolving that it was "highly expedient for the honour of the nation and the benefit of all His Majesty's subjects that a complete and authoritative edition of all the statutes should be published".

Following the publication of the select committee's report, recommendations were made in an address to the crown on 11 July 1800, leading to the creation of the First Record Commission on 19 July 1800 At their first sitting on 19 December 1800, the commissioners resolved "That a complete, and authentic collection of the Statutes of the Realm be prepared; including every Law, as well those repealed or expired as those now in force; with a Chronological List of them, and Tables of their principal Matters", and appointed barristers Alexander Luders, Thomas Edlyne Tomlins and John France as sub-commissioners to prepare the work.

On 24 May 1802, the sub-commissioners laid their plans before the Board, specifying the sources of materials, the selection to be made, the arrangement and distribution of the work, and were authorised to proceed. On 21 May 1806, William Elias Taunton was appointed as sub-commissioner, following the resignation of Alexander Luders. On 23 May 1806, the search for records by William Illingworth and Sir Thomas Edlyne Tomlins was expanded to universities, cathedrals and other public repositories in England and Ireland, who reported back on 23 March 1807.

On 23 May 1806, the Second Record Commission was appointed. The work of the sub-commissioners of the First Record Commission was authorised to continue on 22 July 1806, and the commission passed a resolution requesting the production of a report on the best mode of reducing the volume of the statute book.

On 25 March 1808, the sub-commissioners laid down their first volume, covering statutes made in the reigns of King Henry III, King Edward I, King Edward II and King Edward III and 500 copies were ordered to be printed. On 25 March 1811, a copy of the first volume was laid before King George IV detailing plans for the creation of subsequent volumes.

== List of volumes ==
The first edition was in nine folio volumes, edited by John Raithby, the first published in 1810 and the last in 1822, containing the statutes from King Henry III's Provisions of Merton (1235—36) to the last year of the reign of Queen Anne (1713).

The editors much difficultly in determining what ought to be considered as statutes, leading to the definition "all such instruments as have been inserted in any general collection of statutes printed previously to the edition by Hawkins (Note: Published 1735.) with the addition only of such matters of a public nature, purporting to be statutes, as were first introduced by him or by subsequent editors, and of such other new matters of the like nature as could be taken from sources of authority not to be controverted — namely, Statute Rolls, Inrollments of Acts, Exemplifications, Transcripts by Writ, and original Acts". Accordingly, the first volume contains royal enactments and various documents of which the authenticity and the claim to be considered could be challenged.

On 29 June 1816, the Record Commissioners ordered that a General Index to the Statutes of the Realm, one alphabetical and one chronological, be framed. The tenth volume, containing an alphabetical index to the statutes, was published in 1824, pursuant to an order of the Record Commissioners dated 27 April 1822. The eleventh volume, containing a chronological index to the statutes, was published in 1828, following John Raithby's death in August that year.

Volume	Contents (standardised citation)	Year of publication	Link
I	Hen. 3 to Edw. 3	1810	Internet Archive HathiTrust The full text of Wikisource at Wikisource
II	1 Ric. 2 to 19 Hen. 7	1816	Internet Archive HathiTrust The full text of Wikisource at Wikisource
III	Hen. 8	1817	Google Books Internet Archive HathiTrust The full text of Wikisource at Wikisource
IV (Part I)	1 Edw. 6 to 27 Eliz. 1	1819	Google Books Internet Archive HathiTrust The full text of Wikisource at Wikisource
IV (Part II)	28 & 29 Eliz. 1 to 21 Jas. 1	1819	Google Books Internet Archive HathiTrust The full text of Wikisource at Wikisource
V	1 Cha. 1 to 32 Cha. 2	1819	Google Books Internet Archive HathiTrust British History Online The full text of Wikisource at Wikisource
VI	1 Ja. 2 to 6 & 7 Will. & Mar.	1819	Internet Archive HathiTrust British History Online The full text of Wikisource at Wikisource
VII	Will. 3	1820	Internet Archive HathiTrust British History Online The full text of Wikisource at Wikisource
VIII	1 Ann. to 6 Ann.	1821	Internet Archive HathiTrust The full text of Wikisource at Wikisource
IX	7 Ann. to 13 Ann.	1822	Internet Archive HathiTrust The full text of Wikisource at Wikisource
X	Alphabetical Index	1824	Internet Archive HathiTrust The full text of Wikisource at Wikisource
XI	Chronological Index	1828	Internet Archive HathiTrust The full text of Wikisource at Wikisource

== Legacy ==
In 1807, pursuant to a resolution of the Record Commission passed a resolution to prepare a folio edition of the Scottish Statutes to resemble The Statutes of the Realm. Volumes 2 to 11, containing the statutes from 1224 to 1707 were published between 1814 and 1824, and volume 1, containing the statutes from earlier dates, was published in 1844. No edition of was published for Ireland.

In 1828, the first edition of Chitty's Statutes of Practical Utility was published in two volumes, edited by Joseph Chitty, which printed all statutes relevant to practicing lawyers with short notes, grouped under subject and arranged alphabetically. The second edition of the work was published in four volumes from 1851–4, edited by William Newland Welsby and Edward Beavan. The third edition of the work in four volumes was published in 1865, after Welsby's death during editing. The fourth edition of the work was published in six volumes in 1880, edited by John Mountney Lely. The fifth edition of the work was published in 13 volumes from 1894–5, edited by John Mountney Lely. Supplemental volumes were published annually until 1948.

The Chronological Table of the Statutes, first published in 1870, was based on The Statutes of the Realm as far as the end of the reign of Queen Anne (13 Ann.) Thenceforth, Ruffhead's Edition 1786, edited by Serjeant Charles Runnington, also known as the Statutes at Large, was followed until the end of the 25th year of the reign of King George III (25 Geo. 3).

From 1861, enactments which had ceased to be in force or had become necessary were repealed by the Statute Law Revision Acts. In 1868, the Lord Chancellor, Hugh Cairns, 1st Earl Cairns, appointed the Statute Law Committee to superintend the preparation of the revised edition of the statutes. The 18 volume first edition was published between 1870 and 1878, replacing the 118 volumes that included repealed and expired statutes. A 16 volume second edition was published in 1886, which included a chronological list of acts passed with extent of repeals and a full index for each volume. In 1888, a single volume revised edition of the Ante-Union Irish Statutes from 1710 to 1800 was published by the Irish Government.

From 1887, an authoritative edition of the Annual Statutes was published annually, containing an index to the public general acts of the session, tables of the titles of public general acts, public acts of a local character, local acts and private acts, a table of showing the effect of the year's legislation on public general acts and a table of local and private acts arranged in classes.

Section 19(1)(b) of the Interpretation Act 1978 refers to The Statutes of the Realm.

- 19. Citation of other Acts.
- (1) Where an Act cites another Act by year, statute, session or chapter, or a section or other portion of another Act by number or letter, the reference shall, unless the contrary intention appears, be read as referring—
  - (a) in the case of Acts included in any revised edition of the statutes printed by authority, to that edition;
  - (b) in the case of Acts not so included but included in the edition prepared under the direction of the Record Commission, to that edition;
  - (c) in any other case, to the Acts printed by the Queen’s Printer, or under the superintendence or authority of Her Majesty’s Stationery Office.

== Differences from Ruffhead's Edition (The Statutes at Large) ==
The differences between The Statutes of the Realm and other editions, including Ruffhead's Edition (The Statutes at Large) were considerable. The Chronological Table of the Statutes published variances between The Statutes of the Realm and Ruffhead's Edition, (Note: The edition of Ruffhead referred to throughout is that by Serjeant Runnington, 1786.) with respect to years, statutes and chapters. (Note: Where the year is the same in both editions, a slight difference in the titles or otherwise is not usually noticed as a variance.)

Arranged in the order of the Statutes of the Realm
Statutes of the Realm	Ruffhead's Edition
20 Hen. 3. Stat. Hib. de Coher.	14 Hen. 3
37 Hen. 3	38 Hen. 3
40 Hen. 3	21 Hen. 3
43 Hen. 3	Not printed.
51 & 52 Hen. 3. Dict. de Kenilw.	51 Hen. 3. (Appx.)
4 Edw. 1. Stat. Rageman	Temp. incert. Stat. de Ragman
7 Edw. 1. Stat. de Viris Relig.	7 Edw. 1. St. 2
12 Edw. 1. Stat. Rothlan	10 Edw. 1
13 Edw. 1. Stat. Circ. Agotis	13 Edw. 1. St. 4 Temp. incert. Articles against the King's Prohibitions
18 Edw. 1. Stat. d'ni. R. de t'ris, &c.	18 Edw. 1. St. 1. Quia emptores terr.
18 Edw. 1. Stat. de Consult.	24 Edw. 1
20 Edw. 1. De brevi de Inquis., &c.	Temp. incert. Stat. de brevi de inquis., &c.
20 Edw. 1. De Inquis. non alloc., &c.	34 Edw. 1. St. 3
21 Edw. 1. Stat de Justic. Assig.	Temp. incert. Stat de Justic. Assig.
23 Edw. 1. Stat. de Frang. Pris	1 Ed. 2. St. 2
25 Edw. 1. Magna Carta	9 Hen. 3
25 Edw. 1. Carta de Foresta	9 Hen. 3
25 Edw. 1. Confirmatio Cartarum	25 Edw. 1. St. 1
25 Edw. 1. Pardon to H. de Roham and others	Not printed.
25 Edw. 1. Stat. de Tallag.	34 Edw. 1. St. 4
25 Edw. 1. Sent. lata.	25 Edw. 1. St. 2
33 Edw. 1. Ordin. de Consp.	33 Edw. 1. St. 2
35 Edw. 1	35 Edw. 1. St. 1
2 Edw. 2	Not printed.
3 Edw. 2	2 Edw. 2
5 Edw. 2	Not printed
7 Edw. 2. Stat. sup. Aport. Arm.	7 Edw. 1. St. 1
10 Edw. 1	3 Edw. 2
15 Edw. 2. Revoc. nov. Ord.	16 Edw. 2. Stat. revoking an Establishment, &c.
17 Edw. 2. St. 1	17 Edw. 1
17 Edw. 2. St. 2	17 Edw. 2. St. 3
Temp. incert. — Les Estatuz del Eschekere cc. 1, 2	51 Hen. 3. St. 5. c. 1
Temp. incert. — Les Estatuz del Eschekere c. 3	51 Hen. 3. St. 5. c. 2
Temp. incert. — Les Estatuz del Eschekere cc. 4, 5	51 Hen. 3. St. 5. c. 3
Temp. incert. — Les Estatuz del Eschekere c. 6	51 Hen. 3. St. 5. c. 4
Temp. incert. — Les Estatuz del Eschekere cc. 7—9	51 Hen. 3. St. 5. c. 5
Temp. incert. — Les Estatuz del Eschekere c. 10	51 Hen. 3. St. 5. c. 6
Temp. incert. — Les Estatuz del Eschekere cc. 11—13	51 Hen. 3. St. 5. c. 7, part.
Temp. incert. — Les Estatuz del Eschekere part between cc. 13 & 14, distr'. sc' cii.	51 Hen. 3. St. 4
Temp. incert. — Les Estatuz del Eschekere c. 14	51 Hen. 3. St. 5. c. 7, part.
Temp. incert. — Les Estatuz del Eschekere c. 14, residue, c. 15	51 Hen. 3. St. 5. c. 8
Temp. incert. — Les Estatuz del Eschekere cc. 16—18	51 Hen. 3. St. 5. c. 9
Temp. incert. — Les Estatuz del Eschekere c. 19	51 Hen. 3. St. 5. c. 10
Temp. incert. — Assisa Panis et Cervise	51 Hen. 3. St. 1
Temp. incert. — Judic. Pillorie	51 Hen. 3. St. 6
Temp. incert. — Assisa de Pond et Men.	31 Edw. 1
Temp. incert. — Stat. de Admens. Terre	33 Edw. 1. St. 6
Temp. incert. — Dies Communes de Banco	51 Hen. 3. St. 2
Temp. incert. — Dies Communes de Dote	51 Hen. 3. St. 3
Temp. incert. — Les Estatuz de Excestre	14 Edw. 1 Stat. Exon. and Art. Stat. Exon.
Temp. incert. — Stat. sup. Vic. et Cler.	Not printed.
Temp. incert. — Modus Levandi Fines	18 Edw. 1. St. 4
Temp. incert. — Stat. de fin. and attorn.	15 Edw. 2. Stat. Carl. de Fin,
Temp. incert. — Stat. de Consp.	33 Edw. 1. St. 3
Temp. incert. — Stat. de Protec.	33 Edw. 1. St. 1
Temp. incert. — Mod. calump. Esson'	12 Edw. 2. St. 2
Temp. incert. — Stat. de Moneta	20 Edw. 1. St. 4 and 20 Edw. 1. St. 6
Temp. incert. — Stat. de Moneta parvum	20 Edw. 1. St. 5
Temp. incert. — Ne Rect. prost. Arb.	35 Edw. 1. St. 2
Temp. incert. — Les Estatuz de la Jeuerie	35 Edw. 1. St. 2 Stat. de Judeismo
Temp. incert. — Stat. de Gaveleto	10 Edw. 2
Temp. incert. — Consuetudines Cantiae	Not printed
Temp. incert. — Prorogativa Regis cc. 4—8	17 Edw. 2. St. 1. cc. 4—6
Temp. incert. — Prorogativa Regis cc. 9—18	17 Edw. 2. St. 1. cc. 7—16
Temp. incert. — Modus fac. hom., &c.	17 Edw. 2. St. 2
Temp. incert. — Stat. de Ward', &c.	28 Edw. 1. St. 1
Temp. incert. — Stat. de resp. Milit.	1 Edw. 2. St. 1
Temp. incert. — Stat. de Sacr. Mi. Reg.	Articuli et Sacramenta, &c.
Temp. incert. — Capitula Itineris, inclusive of the part headed Incipiunt Capitula Nova, &c.	Not printed.
Temp. incert. — Capitula Escaetrie	Not printed.
Temp. incert. — Extenta Manerii	4 Edw. 1. St. 1
Temp. incert. — Artic. Inquis. sup. Stat. Wynton.	34 Edw. 1. St. 2
Temp. incert. — Visus Francipleg.	18 Edw. 2
Temp. incert. — Le S'ement dui Visconte	34 Edw. 1
Temp. incert. — Forma Juramenti illor', &c.	Not printed.
Temp. incert. — Juramentu' Ep'or'.	Not printed.
Temp. incert. — Juramentum Escaetorum	Not printed.
Temp. incert. — Juramentum Majorum & Ballivorum	Not printed.
Temp. incert. — Abjuratio & Juramentum Latronum	Not printed.
14 Edw. 3. St. 2	14 Edw. 3. St. 2 and 14 Edw. 3. St. 3
14 Edw. 3. St. 3	14 Edw. 3. St. 5
20 Edw. 3. Oath of justices	18 Edw. 3. St. 4
20 Edw. 3. Oath of the Clerks of Chancery	18 Edw. 3. St. 5
25 Edw. 3. St. 1	25 Edw. 3. St. 2
25 Edw. 3. St. 2	25 Edw. 3. St. 1
25 Edw. 3. St. 3	25 Edw. 3. St. 4
25 Edw. 3. St. 4	25 Edw. 3. St. 6
25 Edw. 3. St. 6	25 Edw. 3. St. 3
25 Edw. 3. Artic. p. Clero resp.	Part foll. 25 Edw. 3. St. 3
46 Edw. 3	Part of 46 Edw. 3. (Appx.)
5 Ric. 2. St. 1. c. 4	5 Ric. 2. St. 1. cc. 4, 5
5 Ric. 2. St. 1. cc. 5—16	5 Ric. 2. St. 1. cc. 6—17
4 Hen. 5 [vel. 3 Hen. 5. St. 2]	3 Hen. 5. St. 2
4 Hen. 5 [St. 2.]	4 Hen. 5
2 Hen. 6. cc. 10—12	2 Hen. 6. bet^{n} cc. 9 & 10
2 Hen. 6. cc. 13—17	2 Hen. 6. cc. 10—14
2 Hen. 6. c. 18	2 Hen. 6. bet^{n} cc. 14 & 15
2 Hen. 6. cc. 19—21	2 Hen. 6. cc. 15—17
3 Hen. 7. cc. 1 [2]	3 Hen. 7. c. 1
3 Hen. 7. c. 16	3 Hen. 7. c. 17. Pr
7 Hen. 7. c. 2	7 Hen. 7. c. 2, 3
7 Hen. 7. cc. 3—7	7 Hen. 7. cc. 4—8
7 Hen. 7. cc. 8—23	7 Hen. 7. cc. 1—16. Pr.
7 Hen. 7. c. 24	Not printed.
11 Hen. 7. cc. 28—65	11 Hen. 7. cc. 1—39. Pr.
12 Hen. 7. cc. 8—13	12 Hen. 7. cc. 1—4, 6, 8. Pr.
19 Hen. 7. cc. 25—40	19 Hen. 7. cc. 1—17. Pr.
1 Hen. 8. cc. 16—20	1 Hen. 8. cc. 1—5. Pr.
3 Hen. 8. cc. 16—23	3 Hen. 8. cc. 1—8. Pr.
4 Hen. 8. cc. 9—17	4 Hen. 8. cc. 1—9. Pr.
4 Hen. 8. c. 18	Not printed.
4 Hen. 8. cc. 19, 20	4 Hen. 8. cc. 10, 11. Pr.
5 Hen. 8. cc. 9—19	5 Hen. 8. cc. 1—11. Pr.
6 Hen. 8. cc. 19—25	6 Hen. 8. cc. 1—7. Pr.
6 Hen. 8. c. 26	Not printed.
7 Hen. 8. cc. 7—11	7 Hen. 8. cc. 3, 1, 2, 4, 5. Pr.
14 & 15 Hen. 8. cc. 15—35	14 & 15 Hen. 8. cc. 5, 6, 1—4, 7—22. Pr.
21 Hen. 8. cc. 22—26	21 Hen. 8. cc. 1—5. Pr.
22 Hen. 8. cc. 17—23	22 Hen. 8. cc. 1—7. Pr.
23 Hen. 8. c. 20	23 Hen. 8. (Appx.)
23 Hen. 8. c. 21—34	23 Hen. 8. 1—14. Pr
24 Hen. 8. cc. 14—16	24 Hen. 8. cc. 1—3. Pr
25 Hen. 8. cc. 23—34	25 Hen. 8. cc. 1—5, 7, 6, 8, 12, 9—12. Pr
26 Hen. 8. cc. 20—26	26 Hen. 8. cc. 1—7. Pr.
27 Hen. 8. cc. 29—59	27 Hen. 8. cc. 35 (or 1), 2—31. Pr.
27 Hen. 8. c. 60	Not printed.
27 Hen. 8. cc. 61—63	27 Hen. 8. cc 32—34. Pr.
28 Hen. 8. cc. 18—52	28 Hen. 8. cc. 1—35. Pr.
32 Hen. 8. c. 51	32 Hen. 8. c. 12. Pr.
34 & 35 Hen. 8. cc. 27, 28	Not printed.
1 Eliz. 1. cc. 23, 24	1 Eliz. 1. cc. 1, 20. Pr.
5 Eliz. 1. c. 30	5 Eliz. 1. c. 30
5 Eliz. 1. c. 31	5 Eliz. 1. c. 30
5 Eliz. 1. c. 32	5 Eliz. 1. c. 1. Pr
8 Eliz. 1. c. 18	8 Eliz. 1. c. 19
8 Eliz. 1. c. 19	8 Eliz. 1. c. 18
8 Eliz. 1. cc. 21, 22	8 Eliz. 1. c. 4, 13. Pr.
23 Eliz. 1. c. 17	23 Eliz. 1. c. 12. Pr.
27 Eliz. 1. c. 31	27 Eliz. 1. c. 17. Pr
1 Ja. 1.	2 [vulgo] Ja. 1
3 Cha. 1. c. 1	3 Cha. 1. part preceding c. 1
3 Cha. 1. cc. 2—8	3 Cha. 1. cc. 1—7
16 Cha. 1. c. 38	16 Cha. 1. c. 1. Pr.
14 Cha. 2	13 & 14 Cha. 2
18 & 19 Cha. 2. cc. 1—5	18 Cha. 2. cc 1—5
18 & 19 Cha. 2. cc. 6—13	19 Cha. 2. cc. 1—8
19 & 20 Cha. 2. cc. 1—5	19 Cha. 2. cc. 9—13
19 & 20 Cha. 2. cc. 6—13	20 Cha. 2. cc. 1—8
22 Cha. 2. c. 14	22 Cha. 2. c. 15. Pr.
22 & 23 Cha. 2. c. 28	22 & 23 Cha. 2. c. 18. Pr
1 Will. & Mar.	1 Will. & Mar. Sess. 1
2 Will. & Mar.	2 Will. & Mar. Sess. 1
7 & 8 Will. 3. c. 40	7 & 8 Will. 3. c. 41. Pr
8 & 9 Will. 3	8 Will. 3 (Note: That is, in the general heading, and to c. 8 inclusive in the running headings.)
9 Will. 3. cc. 32—34	9 Will. 3. cc. 35—37 (Note: 9 & 10 in the running headings.)
9 Will. 3. cc. 35—37	9 Will. 3. cc. 32—34 (Note: 9 & 10 in the running headings.)
10 Will. 3. cc. 10—15	10 Will. 3. cc. 21—26 (Note: 10 & 11 in the running headings.)
10 Will. 3. cc. 21—26	10 Will. 3. cc. 10—15 (Note: 10 & 11 in the running headings.)
11 Will. 3. cc. 2—24	11 & 12 Will. 3. cc 2—24
13 & 14 Will. 3	13 Will. 3
1 Ann. cc. 1—26	1 Ann. St. 1. cc. 7—32
1 Ann. c. 27	1 Ann. St. 1. c. 11. Pr.
1 Ann. St. 2. cc. 15, 16	1 Ann. St. 2. cc. 23, 24
1 Ann. St. 2. c. 17	1 Ann. St. 2. c. 15
1 Ann. St. 2. cc. 18, 19	1 Ann. St. 2. cc 21, 22
1 Ann. St. 2. cc. 20—24	1 Ann. St. 2. cc. 16—20
2 & 3 Ann. cc. 9—13	2 & 3 Ann. cc. 15—19
2 & 3 Ann. cc. 14—16	2 & 3 Ann. cc. 12—14
2 & 3 Ann. c. 17	2 & 3 Ann. c. 20
2 & 3 Ann. cc. 18—20	2 & 3 Ann. cc. 9—11
2 & 3 Ann. cc. 21	2 & 3 Ann. cc. 12. Pr.
3 & 4 Ann. cc. 3, 4	3 & 4 Ann. cc. 5, 6
3 & 4 Ann. c. 5	3 & 4 Ann. c. 16
3 & 4 Ann. cc. 6—14	3 & 4 Ann. cc. 7—15
3 & 4 Ann. cc. 15, 16	3 & 4 Ann. cc. 17, 18
3 & 4 Ann. c. 17, 18	3 & 4 Ann. cc. 3, 4
3 & 4 Ann. c. 19	3 & 4 Ann. c. 1. Pr.
4 & 5 Ann. c. 1	4 Ann. c. 2
4 & 5 Ann. cc. 2—13	4 Ann. cc. 15—26
4 & 5 Ann. c. 14	4 Ann. c. 1
4 & 5 Ann. cc. 15—20	4 Ann. cc. 3—8
4 & 5 Ann. cc. 21—25	4 Ann. cc. 10—14
4 & 5 Ann. c. 26	4 Ann. c. 9
6 Ann. to c. 34 inclusive	5 Ann.
6 Ann. cc. 2—4	5 Ann. cc. 19—21
6 Ann. cc. 5—15	5 Ann. cc. 2—12
6 Ann. cc. 16—20	5 Ann. cc. 14—18
6 Ann. c. 21	5 Ann. c. 13
6 Ann. from c. 35 inclusive	6 Ann.
6 Ann. cc. 35—41	6 Ann. cc. 1—7
6 Ann. c. 42	6 Ann. c. 1. Pr.
6 Ann. cc. 43—45	6 Ann. cc. 8—10
6 Ann. cc. 46, 47	6 Ann. cc. 6, 7. Pr.
6 Ann. c. 50	6 Ann. c. 22
6 Ann. cc. 51—64	6 Ann. cc. 24—37
6 Ann. cc. 65—68	6 Ann. cc. 13—16
6 Ann. cc. 69, 70	6 Ann. cc. 8, 9. Pr.
6 Ann. cc. 71—75	6 Ann. cc. 17—21
6 Ann. cc. 76, 77	6 Ann. cc. 14, 15. Pr.
6 Ann. c. 78	6 Ann. c. 23
6 Ann. c. 78	6 Ann. c. 13. Pr.
7 Ann. cc. 7—10	7 Ann. cc. 1, 4, 5, 27. Pr.
7 Ann. cc. 27—29	7 Ann. cc. 12, 6, 41. Pr.
7 Ann. cc. 30—33	7 Ann. cc. 7—10
7 Ann. c. 34	7 Ann. c. 13. Pr.
8 Ann. cc. 4—8	8 Ann. cc. 8—12
8 Ann. c. 9	8 Ann. c. 2. Pr.
8 Ann. c. 10	8 Ann. c. 4
8 Ann. cc. 11, 12	8 Ann. cc. 6, 7
8 Ann. c. 13	8 Ann. c. 5
8 Ann. c. 14	8 Ann. c. 13
8 Ann. c. 18	8 Ann. c. 14
8 Ann. c. 19	8 Ann. c. 18
8 Ann. c. 20	8 Ann. c. 12. Pr.
8 Ann. cc. 21—22	8 Ann. cc. 14, 15. Pr.
9 Ann. c. 10	9 Ann. c. 4. Pr.
9 Ann. cc. 11—13	9 Ann. cc. 10—12
9 Ann. c. 14	9 Ann. c. 7. Pr.
9 Ann. c. 15	9 Ann. c. 21
9 Ann. c. 16	9 Ann. c. 23
9 Ann. c. 17	9 Ann. c. 22
9 Ann. cc. 18—25	9 Ann. cc. 13—20
9 Ann. cc. 26—32	9 Ann. cc. 24—30
9 Ann. cc. 33, 34	9 Ann. cc. 8, 9. Pr.
10 Ann. cc. 2—4	10 Ann. cc. 8, 7, 33. Pr.
10 Ann. c. 5	10 Ann. c. 6
10 Ann. cc. 6—9	10 Ann. cc. 2—5
10 Ann. cc. 10—13	10 Ann. cc. 7—10
10 Ann. cc. 14—17	10 Ann. cc. 1, 6, 34, 3. Pr.
10 Ann. c. 18	10 Ann. c. 19
10 Ann. c. 19	10 Ann. c. 26
10 Ann. cc. 20—22	10 Ann. cc. 11—13
10 Ann. c. 23	10 Ann. c. 21
10 Ann. cc. 24—28	10 Ann. cc. 14—18
10 Ann. c. 29	10 Ann. c. 20
10 Ann. cc. 30—33	10 Ann. cc. 22—25
10 Ann. cc. 34—41	10 Ann. cc. 27—34
10 Ann. cc. 42—45	10 Ann. cc. 9, 11, 10, 12. Pr.
12 Ann. c. 12	12 Ann. St. 1. c. 16
12 Ann. c. 13—16	12 Ann. St. 1. cc. 12—15
12 Ann. c. 19	12 Ann. St. 1. c. 1. Pr.
13 Ann. c. 2	12 Ann. St. 2. c. 3
13 Ann. c. 3	12 Ann. St. 2. c. 2
13 Ann. cc. 9—15	12 Ann. St. 2. cc. 10—16
13 Ann. cc. 16, 17	12 Ann. St. 2. cc. 1, 2. Pr.
13 Ann. c. 18	12 Ann. St. 2. c. 9
13 Ann. c. 19	12 Ann. St. 2. c. 7. Pr.
13 Ann. cc. 20—26	12 Ann. St. 2. cc. 17—23
13 Ann. cc. 27—33	12 Ann. St. 2. cc. 3, 4, 6, 10, 14—16. Pr.

== See also ==
- The Statutes at Large
- List of acts of the Parliament of England
- List of acts of the Parliament of Great Britain
