= List of acts of the Parliament of England from 1680 =

This is a list of acts of the Parliament of England for the year 1680.

For acts passed during the period 1707–1800, see the list of acts of the Parliament of Great Britain. See also the list of acts of the Parliament of Scotland, and the list of acts of the Parliament of Ireland.

For acts passed from 1801 onwards, see the list of acts of the Parliament of the United Kingdom. For acts of the devolved parliaments and assemblies in the United Kingdom, see the list of acts of the Scottish Parliament, the list of acts of the Northern Ireland Assembly, and the list of acts and measures of Senedd Cymru; see also the list of acts of the Parliament of Northern Ireland.

For medieval statutes, etc. that are not considered to be acts of Parliament, see the list of English statutes.

See also the List of ordinances and acts of the Parliament of England, 1642–1660 for ordinances and acts passed by the Long Parliament and other bodies without royal assent, and which were not considered to be valid legislation following the Restoration in 1660.

The number shown after each act's title is its chapter number. Acts are cited using this number, preceded by the years of the reign during which the relevant parliamentary session was held; thus the Union with Ireland Act 1800 is cited as "39 & 40 Geo. 3. c. 67", meaning the 67th act passed during the session that started in the 39th year of the reign of George III and which finished in the 40th year of that reign. The modern convention is to use Arabic numerals in citations (thus "41 Geo. 3" rather than "41 Geo. III"). Acts of the last session of the Parliament of Great Britain and the first session of the Parliament of the United Kingdom are both cited as "41 Geo. 3".

Acts passed by the Parliament of England did not have a short title; however, some of these acts have subsequently been given a short title by acts of the Parliament of the United Kingdom, such as the Short Titles Act 1896 (59 & 60 Vict. c. 14).

Acts passed by the Parliament of England were deemed to have come into effect on the first day of the session in which they were passed. Because of this, the years given in the list below may in fact be the year before a particular act was passed.

== 32 Cha. 2 ==
The 4th Parliament of King Charles II (the 'Exclusion Bill Parliament'), which met at Oxford from 21 October 1680 until 18 January 1681.

This session was also traditionally cited as 32 Car. 2 (Chronological Table of the Statutes), 32 Chas. 2 or 32 C. 2.

=== Public acts ===
| Short title | Citation | Royal assent |
Long title
| Burying in Woollen Act 1680 (repealed) | 32 Cha. 2. c. 1 | 10 January 1681 |
An Additionall Act for burying in Woollen. (Repealed by Burying in Woollen Act 1814 (54 Geo. 3. c. 108))
| Importation Act 1680 (repealed) | 32 Cha. 2. c. 2 | 10 January 1681 |
An Act prohibiting the Importation of Catle from Ireland. (Repealed by Customs Law Repeal Act 1825 (6 Geo. 4. c. 105))

=== Private acts ===
| Short title | Citation | Royal assent |
Long title
| Hoghton's Estate Act 1680 | 32 Cha. 2. c. 1 Pr. | 10 January 1681 |
An Act for rectifying several Errors and Mistakes in the Marriage Settlement of Sir Charles Hoghton Baronet.

=== Sources ===
- Raithby, John, ed. (1963) [1819]. "32° Car. II.". Statutes of the Realm. Vol. 5: The Statutes of King Charles I and King Charles II (1625–1680). London: Dawsons. pp. 940–942 – via HathiTrust.
- Raithby, John, ed. (1819). Statutes of the Realm. Vol. 5: 1628-80 – via British History Online.
- Pickering, Danby, ed. (1763). "Anno tricesimo secundo Caroli II". The Statutes at Large. Vol. 8: From the Twelfth Year of King Charles II to the Last Year of King James II. Inclusive. Cambridge: Joseph Bentham. pp. 440–443 – via Internet Archive.
- Journals of the House of Commons. Vol. 9. London: His Majesty's Stationery Office. 1803. pp. 636–704.
- Journal of the House of Lords. Vol. 12: 1666-1675. London: His Majesty's Stationery Office. 1830. pp. 610–743 – via British History Online.
- Chronological Table of and Index to the Statutes. Vol. 1: To the End of the Session 59 Vict. Sess. 2 (1895) (13th ed.). London: Her Majesty's Stationery Office. 1896. p. 74.
- Chronological Table of the Statutes: Covering the Period from 1235 to the End of 1971. London: Her Majesty's Stationery Office. 1972. p. 72. ISBN 978-0-11-840096-1.
- "Chronological Tables of the Private and Personal Acts: Part 3 (1660–1680)". legislation.gov.uk. The National Archives.

== See also ==
- List of acts of the Parliament of England
