= Attendance in Parliament Act 1514 =

Act of the Parliament of England

- Act of Parliament
- Parliament of England
- Long title: An Act that no Knights of Shires nor Burgesses depart before the End of the Parliament.
- Citation: 6 Hen. 8. c. 16
- Territorial extent: England and Wales

Dates
- Royal assent: 15 March 1515
- Commencement: 5 February 1515 (Note: Start of session.)
- Repealed: 5 November 1993
Other legislation
Repealed by	Statute Law (Repeals) Act 1993

Status: Repealed

Text of statute as originally enacted

Revised text of statute as amended

Text of the The Act 6 Hen. 8 as in force today (including any amendments) within the United Kingdom, from legislation.gov.uk.

The Attendance in Parliament Act 1514 (6 Hen. 8. c. 16) was an act of the Parliament of England that forbade any member of the House of Commons from departing before the end of a session without the Speaker's licence, on pain of forfeiting the wages which were then payable by his constituency.

== Background ==
Monarchs in England had long desired to have a full parliament (plenum parliamentum). In the 16th century, serving in Parliament was viewed primarily as an onerous duty rather than a desirable privilege. Members of Parliament often tried to reduce their attendance time, attempting to leave early to save their constituents several weeks' payment.

== Subsequent developments ==
The act proved largely ineffective in achieving its intended purpose of ensuring parliamentary attendance. Its method of penalising absent members by forfeiting constituency-paid wages became irrelevant when the practice of paying members ceased during the 17th century.

Alternative disciplinary measures emerged over time. "Calls of the House" - a system that fined members who failed to respond when the roll was called at a specific time - replaced the act's approach but eventually became obsolete by the 19th century.

The whole act was repealed by section 1(1) of, and group 2 of part XI of schedule 1 to, the Statute Law (Repeals) Act 1993, which came into force on 5 November 1993.
