= List of acts of the Parliament of England, 1225–1267 =

The number shown after each act's title is its chapter number. Acts are cited using this number, preceded by the year(s) of the reign during which the relevant parliamentary session was held; thus the Union with Ireland Act 1800 is cited as "39 & 40 Geo. 3. c. 67", meaning the 67th act passed during the session that started in the 39th year of the reign of George III and which finished in the 40th year of that reign. Note that the modern convention is to use Arabic numerals in citations (thus "41 Geo. 3" rather than "41 Geo. III"). Acts of the last session of the Parliament of Great Britain and the first session of the Parliament of the United Kingdom are both cited as "41 Geo. 3".

Acts passed by the Parliament of England did not have a short title; however, some of these acts have subsequently been given a short title by acts of the Parliament of the United Kingdom (such as the Short Titles Act 1896).

Acts passed by the Parliament of England were deemed to have come into effect on the first day of the session in which they were passed. Because of this, the years given in the list below may in fact be the year before a particular act was passed.

== 1225 (9 Hen. 3) ==
This session was also traditionally cited as 9 H. 3.

For Magna Charta and Charta Foresæ, cited as 9 Hen. 3 in The Statutes at Large, see 25 Edw. 1.

== 1229 (14 Hen. 3) ==
This session was also traditionally cited as 14 H. 3.

For Statutum Hibernie de Coheredibus, cited as 14 Hen. 3 in The Statutes at Large, see 20 Hen. 3.

== 1235 (20 Hen. 3) ==
A Parliament of King Henry III which met at Merton from 23 January 1236.

This session was also traditionally cited as 20 H. 3.

Provisiones de Merton (Provisions of Merton) — commonly known as the Statute of Merton Act 1236

- Damages on Writ Dower Act 1235 c. 1 A Woman shall recover Damages in a Writ of Dower. — repealed for England and Wales by Statute Law Revision and Civil Procedure Act 1881 (44 & 45 Vict. c. 59) and for Scotland and Northern Ireland by Statute Law Revision Act 1950 (14 Geo. 6. c. 6)
- Widow's Bequest of Corn on Her Land Act 1235 c. 2 Widows may bequeath the crop of their land. — repealed by Statute Law Revision Act 1948 (11 & 12 Geo. 6. c. 62)
- (Redisseisin) c. 3 Enquiry and Punishment of Redisseisin. — repealed for England and Wales by Statute Law Revision Act 1863 (26 & 27 Vict. c. 125) and for Ireland by Statute Law (Ireland) Revision Act 1872 (35 & 36 Vict. c. 98)
- Commons Act 1236 or the Commons Act 1235 c. 4 In what Cases Lords may approve against their Tenants. — repealed by Statute Law Revision Act 1953 (2 & 3 Eliz. 2. c. 5)
- (Usury) c. 5 Usury shall not run against any within Age. — repealed for England and Wales by Statute Law Revision Act 1863 (26 & 27 Vict. c. 125) and for Ireland by Statute Law (Ireland) Revision Act 1872 (35 & 36 Vict. c. 98)
- (Wardship) c. 6 The Penalties for Ravishment of a Ward, Forfeiture of Marriage, or Disparagement of a Ward. — repealed for England and Wales by Statute Law Revision Act 1863 (26 & 27 Vict. c. 125) and for Ireland by Statute Law (Ireland) Revision Act 1872 (35 & 36 Vict. c. 98)
- (Wardship) c. 7 In what case the Ward shall pay to his Lord the Value of his Marriage. — repealed for England and Wales by Statute Law Revision Act 1863 (26 & 27 Vict. c. 125) and for Ireland by Statute Law (Ireland) Revision Act 1872 (35 & 36 Vict. c. 98)
- (Limitation of writs) c. 8 Several Limitations of Prescription in several Writs. — repealed for England and Wales by Statute Law Revision Act 1863 (26 & 27 Vict. c. 125) and for Ireland by Statute Law (Ireland) Revision Act 1872 (35 & 36 Vict. c. 98)
- (Special bastardy) c. 9 He is a Bastard that is born before the Marriage of his Parents. — repealed by Statute Law Revision Act 1948 (11 & 12 Geo. 6. c. 62)
- (Attorneys in county courts) c. 10 Attornies allowed to make Suit to several Courts. — repealed by Civil Procedure Acts Repeal Act 1879 (42 & 43 Vict. c. 59)
- (Trespassers in parks) c. 11 Lords shall not imprison Offenders at their own Wills for Trespasses in their Parks and Ponds. — repealed for England and Wales by Statute Law Revision Act 1863 (26 & 27 Vict. c. 125) and for Ireland by Statute Law (Ireland) Revision Act 1872 (35 & 36 Vict. c. 98)

Breve de Nova Constituione Rot. Claus. 20 Hen. III. m. 18. d — not included in the Chronological Table of the Statutes

De Provisione novorum Brevium Rot. Pat. 21. Hen. III. m. 10 — not included in the Chronological Table of the Statutes

Statutum Hibernie de Coheredibus (Statute of Ireland concerning Coparceners) or Coparceners Act 1229 — cited as 14 Hen. 3 in The Statutes at Large, which gives the year as 1229— repealed for England and Wales by Statute Law Revision Act 1863 (26 & 27 Vict. c. 125) and for Ireland by Statute Law (Ireland) Revision Act 1872 (35 & 36 Vict. c. 98)

=== Sources ===
- "52° Hen. III". The Statutes of the Realm. Vol. 1. pp. 1–5 – via HathiTrust.
- "Anno vicesimo Henrici III". The Statutes at Large. Vol. 1 – Magna Charta to 14 Edward III – 1225 to 1340. 16 April 1762. pp. 24–31 – via Internet Archive.
- "Anno vicesimo Henrici III". The Statutes at Large. Vol. 1 – Magna Charta to 14 Edward III – 1225 to 1340. Cambridge, Printed by J. Bentham. 16 April 1762. pp. 24–31 – via Internet Archive.
- "Anno decimo quarto Henrici III". The Statutes at Large. Vol. 1 – Magna Charta to 14 Edward III – 1225 to 1340. 16 April 1762. pp. 23–24 – via Internet Archive.
- "Anno decimo quarto Henrici III". The Statutes at Large. Vol. 1 – Magna Charta to 14 Edward III – 1225 to 1340. Cambridge, Printed by J. Bentham. 16 April 1762. pp. 23–24 – via Internet Archive.
- Chronological Table of and Index to the Statutes. Vol. 1: To the End of the Session 59 Vict. Sess. 2 (1895) (13th ed.). London: Her Majesty's Stationery Office. 1896. p. 11 – via Google Books.
- Chronological Table of the Statutes: Covering the Period from 1235 to the End of 1971. London: Her Majesty's Stationery Office. 1972. p. 9. ISBN 978-0-11-840096-1 – via Google Books.
- "Acts of the English Parliament from 1267". legislation.gov.uk. The National Archives.

== 1236 (21 Hen. 3) ==
This session was also traditionally cited as 21 H. 3.

For De Anno Bissextili, cited as 21 Hen. 3 in The Statutes at Large, see 40 Hen. 3.

== 1252 (37 Hen. 3) ==
A Parliament of King Henry III which met at London from 13 October 1252.

This session was also traditionally cited as 37 H. 3 or 38 H.3.

Sententia Excommunicationis Lata in Transgressores Cartarum (Curse on Breakers of the Charters) — cited as The Sentence of Curse given by the Bishops against the Breakers of the Great Charter (38 Hen. 3) in The Statutes at Large — repealed for England and Wales by Statute Law Revision Act 1863 (26 & 27 Vict. c. 125) and for Ireland by Statute Law (Ireland) Revision Act 1872 (35 & 36 Vict. c. 98)

Protestatio Regis et Magnatum (Protest of the King and the Magnates) Rot. Pat. 37 Hen. III— listed in The Statutes of the Realm, not listed in the Chronological Table of the Statutes

=== Sources ===
- "37° Hen. III". The Statutes of the Realm. Vol. 1. pp. 6–7 – via HathiTrust.
- "Anno tricesimo octavo Henrici III". The Statutes at Large. Vol. 1 – Magna Charta to 14 Edward III – 1225 to 1340. 16 April 1762. p. 33 – via Internet Archive.
- "Anno tricesimo octavo Henrici III". The Statutes at Large. Vol. 1 – Magna Charta to 14 Edward III – 1225 to 1340. Cambridge, Printed by J. Bentham. 16 April 1762. p. 33 – via Internet Archive.
- Chronological Table of and Index to the Statutes. Vol. 1: To the End of the Session 59 Vict. Sess. 2 (1895) (13th ed.). London: Her Majesty's Stationery Office. 1896. p. 11 – via Google Books.
- Chronological Table of the Statutes: Covering the Period from 1235 to the End of 1971. London: Her Majesty's Stationery Office. 1972. p. 9. ISBN 978-0-11-840096-1 – via Google Books.

== 1256 (40 Hen. 3) ==
This session was also traditionally cited as 40 H. 3.

Provisio de Anno Bisextili et Die (Provision for Leap Years and Days) — cited as 21 Hen. 3 in The Statutes at Large which gives the year as 1236, The Statutes of the Realm gives the year as 1256, whilst the Chronological Table of the Statutes gives it as 1255; repealed by Civil Procedure Acts Repeal Act 1879 (42 & 43 Vict. c. 59)

=== Sources ===
- "40° Hen. III". The Statutes of the Realm. Vol. 1. p. 7 – via HathiTrust.
- "Anno vicesimo primo Henrici III". The Statutes at Large. Vol. 1 – Magna Charta to 14 Edward III – 1225 to 1340. 16 April 1762. p. 32 – via Internet Archive.
- "Anno vicesimo primo Henrici III". The Statutes at Large. Vol. 1 – Magna Charta to 14 Edward III – 1225 to 1340. Cambridge, Printed by J. Bentham. 16 April 1762. p. 32 – via Internet Archive.
- Chronological Table of and Index to the Statutes. Vol. 1: To the End of the Session 59 Vict. Sess. 2 (1895) (13th ed.). London: Her Majesty's Stationery Office. 1896. p. 11 – via Google Books.
- Chronological Table of the Statutes: Covering the Period from 1235 to the End of 1971. London: Her Majesty's Stationery Office. 1972. p. 9. ISBN 978-0-11-840096-1 – via Google Books.

== 1259 (43 Hen. 3) ==
This session was also traditionally cited as 43 H. 3.

De Provisionibus factis per Regem et Consilium suum (Provisions made by the King and his Council) — The Statutes of the Realm gives the year as 1259, although the Chronological Table of the Statutes gives it as 1258; not printed in The Statutes at Large — repealed for England and Wales by Statute Law Revision Act 1863 (26 & 27 Vict. c. 125) and for Ireland by Statute Law (Ireland) Revision Act 1872 (35 & 36 Vict. c. 98)

=== Sources ===
- "43° Hen. III". The Statutes of the Realm. Vol. 1. pp. 8–11 – via HathiTrust.
- Chronological Table of and Index to the Statutes. Vol. 1: To the End of the Session 59 Vict. Sess. 2 (1895) (13th ed.). London: Her Majesty's Stationery Office. 1896. p. 11 – via Google Books.
- Chronological Table of the Statutes: Covering the Period from 1235 to the End of 1971. London: Her Majesty's Stationery Office. 1972. p. 9. ISBN 978-0-11-840096-1 – via Google Books.

== 1266 (51 Hen. 3) ==
This session was also traditionally cited as 51 H. 3.

For Assisa Panis et Cervisie, cited as 51 Hen. 3. Stat. 1 in The Statutes at Large, see Statutes of uncertain date.

For Dies Communes in Banco, cited as 51 Hen. 3. Stat. 2 in The Statutes at Large, see Dies Communes de Banco under Statutes of uncertain date.

For Dies Communes in Banco in placito dotis, cited as 51 Hen. 3. Stat. 3 in The Statutes at Large, see Dies Communes de Dote under Statutes of uncertain date.

For De Districtione Scaccarrii, cited as 51 Hen. 3. Stat. 4 in The Statutes at Large, see Districciones de Scaccario and Les Estatuz del Eschekere under Statutes of uncertain date.

For Statutum De Scaccarrio, cited as 51 Hen. 3. Stat. 5 in The Statutes at Large, see Les Estatuz del Eschekere under Statutes of uncertain date.

For Judicium Pillorie, cited as 51 Hen. 3. Stat. 6 in The Statutes at Large, see Statutes of uncertain date.

For The Award made between the King and his Commons at Kenelworth, cited as 51 Hen. 3 in The Statutes at Large, see Dictum de Kenilworth under 51 & 52 Hen. 3.

== 1266 (51 & 52 Hen. 3) ==
A Parliament of King Henry III which met at Kenilworth from 22 August 1266.

This session was also traditionally cited as 51 & 52 H. 3.

Dictum de Kenilworth (Dictum of Kenilworth) or Rights, Liberties, etc. Act 1266 — cited as 51 Hen. 3 in The Statutes at Large — repealed for England and Wales by Statute Law Revision Act 1863 (26 & 27 Vict. c. 125) and for Ireland by Statute Law (Ireland) Revision Act 1872 (35 & 36 Vict. c. 98)

Explanacio Dicti de Kenillworthe (Explanation of the Dictum of Kenilworth) MS. Cott. Claud. D.II. — listed in The Statutes of the Realm, not listed in the Chronological Table of the Statutes, not printed in The Statutes at Large — repealed for England and Wales by Statute Law Revision Act 1863 (26 & 27 Vict. c. 125) and for Ireland by Statute Law (Ireland) Revision Act 1872 (35 & 36 Vict. c. 98)

Addicio Dicti de Kenillworthe (Addendum to the Dictum of Kenilworth) MS. Cott. XXV. — listed in The Statutes of the Realm, not listed in the Chronological Table of the Statutes, not printed in The Statutes at Large — repealed for England and Wales by Statute Law Revision Act 1863 (26 & 27 Vict. c. 125) and for Ireland by Statute Law (Ireland) Revision Act 1872 (35 & 36 Vict. c. 98)

=== Sources ===
- "51° & 52° Hen. III". The Statutes of the Realm. Vol. 1. pp. 12–18 – via HathiTrust.
- "Anno quinquagesimo primo Henrici III". The Statutes at Large. Vol. 1 – Magna Charta to 14 Edward III – 1225 to 1340. 16 April 1762. pp. 50–55 – via Internet Archive.
- "Anno quinquagesimo primo Henrici III". The Statutes at Large. Vol. 1 – Magna Charta to 14 Edward III – 1225 to 1340. Cambridge, Printed by J. Bentham. 16 April 1762. pp. 50–55 – via Internet Archive.
- Chronological Table of and Index to the Statutes. Vol. 1: To the End of the Session 59 Vict. Sess. 2 (1895) (13th ed.). London: Her Majesty's Stationery Office. 1896. p. 11 – via Google Books.
- Chronological Table of the Statutes: Covering the Period from 1235 to the End of 1971. London: Her Majesty's Stationery Office. 1972. p. 9. ISBN 978-0-11-840096-1 – via Google Books.

== 1267 (52 Hen. 3) ==
A Parliament of King Henry III which met at Malborough from c. 18 November 1267.

This session was also traditionally cited as 52 H. 3.

Statutum de Marleberge (Statute of Marlborough) – the oldest piece of statute law currently extant in England and Wales

- Distress Act 1267 c. 1 Of wrongful Distresses, or Defiances of the King's Courts. Punishment for unlawful Distresses. —
  still in force
- (Distress) c. 2 None but Suitors shall be distrained to come to a Court. — repealed by Statute Law Revision Act 1948 (11 & 12 Geo. 6. c. 62)
- (Resisting King's officers in replevin, etc.) c. 3 A Lord shall not pay a Fine for distraining his Tenant. — repealed by Statute Law Revision and Civil Procedure Act 1881 (44 & 45 Vict. c. 59)
- Distress Act 1267 c. 4 Distresses shall not be driven out of the County. Distresses shall be reasonable. —
  still in force
- (Confirmation of charters) c. 5 A Confirmation of the Great Charter, and the Charter of the Forest. — repealed by Statute Law Revision and Civil Procedure Act 1881 (44 & 45 Vict. c. 59)
- (Wardship) c. 6 A fraudulent Conveyance to defeat a Lord of his Wardship shall be void. — repealed for England and Wales by Statute Law Revision Act 1863 (26 & 27 Vict. c. 125) and for Ireland by Statute Law (Ireland) Revision Act 1872 (35 & 36 Vict. c. 98)
- (Wardship) c. 7 Process in a Communi Custodia. Ward by reason of Ward. — repealed for England and Wales by Statute Law Revision Act 1863 (26 & 27 Vict. c. 125) and for Ireland by Statute Law (Ireland) Revision Act 1872 (35 & 36 Vict. c. 98)
- (Redisseisin) c. 8 The Punishment of those of commit Redisseisin. — repealed for England and Wales by Statute Law Revision Act 1863 (26 & 27 Vict. c. 125) and for Ireland by Statute Law (Ireland) Revision Act 1872 (35 & 36 Vict. c. 98)
- Suits of Court Act 1267 c. 9 Who shall do Suit of Court. Suit of Court by Coparceners. Contra formam foeffamenti. — repealed by Statute Law Revision and Civil Procedure Act 1881 (44 & 45 Vict. c. 59)
- (Sheriff's tourns) c. 10 Certain Persons exempt from Appearance at Sheriffs Tourns. — repealed by Statute Law Revision and Civil Procedure Act 1881 (44 & 45 Vict. c. 59)
- (Beaupleader) c. 11 No Fines shall be taken for Beaupleader. — repealed for England and Wales by Statute Law Revision Act 1863 (26 & 27 Vict. c. 125) and for Ireland by Statute Law (Ireland) Revision Act 1872 (35 & 36 Vict. c. 98)
- Real Actions Act 1267 c. 12 Days given in Dower, Assise of Darraine Presentment, and Quare impedit. — repealed for England and Wales by Statute Law Revision Act 1863 (26 & 27 Vict. c. 125) and for Ireland by Statute Law (Ireland) Revision Act 1872 (35 & 36 Vict. c. 98)
- (Essoins) c. 13 After Issue joined there shall be but one Essoin, or one Default. — repealed for England and Wales by Statute Law Revision Act 1863 (26 & 27 Vict. c. 125) and for Ireland by Statute Law (Ireland) Revision Act 1872 (35 & 36 Vict. c. 98)
- (Juries) c. 14 They who have Charters of Exemption must in some Cases be Sworn. — repealed for England and Wales by Juries Act 1825 (6 Geo. 4. c. 50) and for Ireland by Juries (Ireland) Act 1833 (3 & 4 Will. 4. c. 91)
- Distress Act 1267 c. 15 In what Places Distresses shall not be taken. —
  still in force
- (Wardships, etc.) c. 16 The Heir's Remedy, if his Lord do keep him forth. The King's Primer Seisin. — repealed for England and Wales by Statute Law Revision Act 1863 (26 & 27 Vict. c. 125) and for Ireland by Statute Law (Ireland) Revision Act 1872 (35 & 36 Vict. c. 98)
- (Guardians in socage) c. 17 The Authority and Duty of Guardians in Socage. — repealed by Statute Law Revision Act 1948 (11 & 12 Geo. 6. c. 62)
- (Amercements for default of summons) c. 18 Who only may amerce for Default of common Summons. — repealed by Civil Procedure Acts Repeal Act 1879 (42 & 43 Vict. c. 59)
- (Plea of false judgment) c. 19 (Note: 52 Hen. 3. cc. 20 and 19 appear in this order in The Statutes of the Realm and the Chronological Table of the Statutes) None but the King shall hold Plea of false Judgement. — repealed by Civil Procedure Acts Repeal Act 1879 (42 & 43 Vict. c. 59)
- (Essoins) c. 20 In which Courts none shall need to swear to warrant their Essoins. — repealed by Civil Procedure Acts Repeal Act 1879 (42 & 43 Vict. c. 59)
- (Replevin) c. 21 Who may take Replevins of Distresses. — repealed by Statute Law Revision and Civil Procedure Act 1881 (44 & 45 Vict. c. 59)
- (Freeholders) c. 22 None shall compel his Freeholder to answer for his Freehold. — repealed for England and Wales by Statute Law Revision Act 1863 (26 & 27 Vict. c. 125) and for Ireland by Statute Law (Ireland) Revision Act 1872 (35 & 36 Vict. c. 98)
- Waste Act 1267 c. 23 A Remedy against Accomptants. Fermors shall make no Waste. —
  still in force
- (Inquest) c. 24 For what Causes Townships ought not to be amerced. — repealed for England and Wales by Statute Law Revision Act 1863 (26 & 27 Vict. c. 125) and for Ireland by Statute Law (Ireland) Revision Act 1872 (35 & 36 Vict. c. 98)
- (Murder) c. 25 What Kind of Manslaughter shall be adjudged Murder. — repealed for England and Wales by Offences Against the Person Act 1828 (9 Geo. 4. c. 31), for Ireland by Offences Against the Person (Ireland) Act 1829 (10 Geo. 4. c. 34) and for India by Criminal Law (India) Act 1828 (9 Geo. 4. c. 74).
- (Real actions) c. 26 What Day shall be given to him that is vouched to Warranty. — repealed for England and Wales by Statute Law Revision Act 1863 (26 & 27 Vict. c. 125) and for Ireland by Statute Law (Ireland) Revision Act 1872 (35 & 36 Vict. c. 98)
- (Benefit of clergy) c. 27 A Clerk bailed upon a capital Offence refuseth to answer. — repealed for England and Wales by Statute Law Revision Act 1863 (26 & 27 Vict. c. 125) and for Ireland by Statute Law (Ireland) Revision Act 1872 (35 & 36 Vict. c. 98)
- (Prelates) c. 28 Remedies for Successors of Prelates for Wrongs done to their Predecessors, &c. — repealed by Civil Procedure Acts Repeal Act 1879 (42 & 43 Vict. c. 59)
- (Real actions) c. 29 In what Case a Writ of Entry for disseisin in the Post doth lye. — repealed for England and Wales by Statute Law Revision Act 1863 (26 & 27 Vict. c. 125) and for Ireland by Statute Law (Ireland) Revision Act 1872 (35 & 36 Vict. c. 98)

=== Sources ===
- "52° Hen. III". The Statutes of the Realm. Vol. 1. pp. 19–25 – via HathiTrust.
- "Anno quinquagesimo secundo Henrici III". The Statutes at Large. Vol. 1 – Magna Charta to 14 Edward III – 1225 to 1340. 16 April 1762. pp. 55–74 – via Internet Archive.
- "Anno quinquagesimo secundo Henrici III". The Statutes at Large. Vol. 1 – Magna Charta to 14 Edward III – 1225 to 1340. Cambridge, Printed by J. Bentham. 16 April 1762. pp. 55–74 – via Internet Archive.
- Chronological Table of and Index to the Statutes. Vol. 1: To the End of the Session 59 Vict. Sess. 2 (1895) (13th ed.). London: Her Majesty's Stationery Office. 1896. pp. 11–12 – via Google Books.
- Chronological Table of the Statutes: Covering the Period from 1235 to the End of 1971. London: Her Majesty's Stationery Office. 1972. pp. 9–10. ISBN 978-0-11-840096-1 – via Google Books.
- "Acts of the English Parliament from 1267". legislation.gov.uk. The National Archives.

== See also ==
- List of acts of the Parliament of England
