= Burying in Woollen Acts =

Legislation in England

Burying in Woollen Act 1666
- Act of Parliament
- Parliament of England
- Long title: An Act for Burying in Woollen onely.
- Citation: 18 & 19 Cha. 2. c. 4: (Ruffhead: 18 Cha. 2. c. 4)
- Territorial extent: England and Wales

Dates
- Royal assent: 18 January 1667
- Commencement: 25 March 1667 (Note: Section 1.)
- Repealed: 28 July 1863
Other legislation
Repealed by	Statute Law Revision Act 1863

Status: Repealed

Text of statute as originally enacted

Burying in Woollen Act 1678
- Act of Parliament
- Parliament of England
- Long title: An Act for burying in Woollen.
- Citation: 30 Cha. 2. c. 3
- Territorial extent: England and Wales

Dates
- Royal assent: 15 July 1678
- Commencement: 23 May 1678 (Note: Start of session)
- Repealed: 23 July 1814
Other legislation
Repeals/revokes	Burying in Woollen Act 1666
Repealed by	Burying in Woollen Act 1814

Status: Repealed

Text of statute as originally enacted

Burying in Woollen Act 1680
- Act of Parliament
- Parliament of England
- Long title: An Additionall Act for burying in Woollen.
- Citation: 32 Cha. 2. c. 1
- Territorial extent: England and Wales

Dates
- Royal assent: 10 January 1681
- Commencement: 2 February 1680 (Note: Section 1.)
- Repealed: 23 July 1814
Other legislation
Repealed by	Burying in Woollen Act 1814

Status: Repealed

Text of statute as originally enacted

The Burying in Woollen Acts 1666–80 were acts of the Parliament of England (citation 18 & 19 Cha. 2. c. 4 (1666), 30 Cha. 2. c. 3 (1678) and 32 Cha. 2. c. 1 (1680)) which required the dead, except plague victims and the destitute, to be buried in pure English woollen shrouds to the exclusion of any foreign textiles.

== Enforcement ==
It was a requirement that an affidavit be sworn in front of a justice of the peace (usually by a relative of the deceased), confirming burial in wool, with the punishment of a £5 fee for noncompliance. Burial entries in parish registers were marked with the word "affidavit" or its equivalent to confirm that affidavit had been sworn; it would be marked "naked" for those too poor to afford the woollen shroud.

Burying in Woollen Act 1814
- Act of Parliament
- Parliament of the United Kingdom
- Long title: An Act to repeal Two Acts of the Thirtieth and Thirty second Years of King Charles the Second, for burying in Woollen, and for indemnifying Persons against Penalties for Offences committed against the said Acts.
- Citation: 54 Geo. 3. c. 108
- Territorial extent: United Kingdom

Dates
- Royal assent: 23 July 1814
- Commencement: 23 July 1814 (Note: The Acts of Parliament (Commencement) Act 1793.)
- Repealed: 5 August 1873
Other legislation
Repeals/revokes	Burying in Woollen Act 1678; Burying in Woollen Act 1680
Repealed by	Statute Law Revision Act 1873

Status: Repealed

Text of statute as originally enacted

The legislation was in force until the passing of the Burying in Woollen Act 1814 (54 Geo. 3. c. 108), but was generally ignored after 1770. The 1666 act had been annulled by the passing of the 1680 act. The whole act was repealed by section 1 of, and the schedule to, the Statute Law Revision Act 1863 (26 & 27 Vict. c. 125), which came into force on 28 July 1863.

== Use in genealogy ==
Burial records so annotated can be a source of genealogical information, providing evidence of economic status and relationships that may be otherwise unavailable or ambiguous.
