= Owen Ruffhead =

English writer

Owen Ruffhead (1723 – 25 October 1769) was a miscellaneous writer, and the descendant of a Welsh family who were bakers to King George I of Great Britain.

== Legal consultant and writer ==
The junior Owen Ruffhead was born in Piccadilly. When still a child his father bought him a lottery ticket, and, drawing a prize of £500, invested the money in his son's education. He entered the Middle Temple in 1742, was called to the bar in 1747, and he gradually obtained a good practice, less as a regular pleader than as a consultant and framer of bills for Parliament. In the meantime he sought to form some political connections, and, with this end in view, he in 1757 started the Con-Test in support of the government against the gibes of a weekly paper called the Test, which was run by Arthur Murphy in the interests of Henry Fox (afterwards first Baron Holland) Both abounded in personalities, and the hope expressed by Samuel Johnson in the Literary Magazine, that neither would be long-lived, was happily fulfilled (see A Morning's Thoughts on Reading the Test and the Con-Test, 1757, octavo). From about 1760 he commenced editing, at the cost of great labour, The Statutes at Large from Magna Charta to 1763, which was issued in nine folio volumes, London, 1762–1765, and again in 1769. Ruffhead's collection maintained a position of authority, and was continued successively by Charles Runnington, Sir Thomas Edlyne Tomlins, John Raithby, Simons, and Sir George Kettilby Rickards. In 1760 Ruffhead addressed to William Pitt a letter of some eloquence upon the Reasons why the approaching Treaty of Peace should be debated in Parliament, and this was followed by pamphlets, including Considerations on the Present Dangerous Crisis (1763, quarto), and The Case of the late Election for the County of Middlesex considered (1764, quarto), in which he defended the conduct of the administration in relation to John Wilkes.

== Literary critic ==
In about 1767, Bishop William Warburton asked Ruffhead to undertake the task of digesting into a volume his materials for a critical biography of Alexander Pope. Warburton reserved to himself the reading of the proof-sheets and the supervision of the plan. Ruffhead set to work with the methodical industry that was habitual to him, and the result appeared in 1769 (preface dated Middle Temple, 2 January) as The Life of Alexander Pope, from Original Manuscripts, with a Critical Essay on his Writings and Genius in an appendix were printed letters from Pope to Aaron Hill. Though tame and lifeless, the book was read with avidity as affording for the first time a quantity of authentic information about the best-known name of a literary epoch; four editions appeared within the year (one at Dublin), and the work was translated into French (it was also prefixed to Pope's Works, Paris, 1799). The verdict of a reviewer (possibly Johnson) in the Gentleman's Magazine, that "Mr. Ruffhead says of fine passages that they are fine, and of feeble passages that they are feeble; but recommending poetical beauty is like remarking the splendour of sunshine—to those who can see it is unnecessary; to those who are blind, absurd", was subsequently abridged by Johnson into "Ruffhead knew nothing of Pope and nothing of poetry". Elwin dismisses him as "an uncritical transcriber".

Ruffhead was himself a reviewer for the Gentleman's Magazine, and he had in hand simultaneously with his Life of Pope, an edition of Giles Jacob's New Law Dictionary (published after his death in 1772), and the superintendence of a new edition of Ephraim Chambers' Cyclopædia, or an Universal Dictionary of Arts and Sciences.

== Death and issue ==
His close application to his later literary works, in addition to his legal duties, undermined his health, and a cold taken in a heated court resulted in his premature death on 25 October 1769. A few days before his death, in recognition of his political services, he had received an offer of a secretaryship in the treasury. He left one son, Thomas, who died a curate of Prittlewell in Essex in 1798. The publishers recovered from him a sum advanced to his father on account of Chambers' Cyclopædia the supervision of which was transferred in 1773 to John Calder.
