= Succession Act 1965 =

Act of the Oireachtas No. 27 of 1965

The Succession Act 1965 (No. 27) was an act of the Irish Oireachtas that was intended to provide for the surviving spouse of the deceased if the deceased was intestate or specified a less than equitable share of the estate. Up to then, Irish citizens could apportion their estate as they wished without regard to the needs of their spouse or family.
