= Charles Runnington =

British editor and writer

Charles Runnington (1751–1821), serjeant-at-law, born in Hertfordshire on 29 August 1751 (and probably son of John Runnington, mayor of Hertford in 1754), was educated under private tutors, and after some years of special pleading was called to the bar at the Inner Temple in Hilary term 1778. He was made serjeant-at-law on 27 November 1787, and held for a time the office of deputy-judge of the Marshalsea Court. On 27 May 1815 he was appointed to the chief-commissionership in insolvency, which he resigned in 1819. He died at Brighton on 18 January 1821. Runnington married twice—in 1777, Anna Maria, youngest sister of Sir Samuel Shepherd, by whom he had a son and a daughter; secondly, in 1783, Mrs. Wetherell, widow of Charles Wetherell of Jamaica. His only son, Charles Henry Runnington, died on 20 November 1810.

== Works ==
Runnington, besides editing certain well-known legal works by Sir Geoffrey Gilbert, Sir Matthew Hale and Owen Ruffhead was author of A Treatise on the Action of Ejectment (founded on Gilbert's work), London, 1781, 8vo, which was recast and revised as The History, Principles, and Practice of the Legal Remedy by Ejectment, and the resulting Action for Mesne Profits (London, 1795, 8vo), 2nd edition by William Ballantine, published in 1820.

Runnington edited:

- The History of the Common Law, by Sir Matthew Hale, Fourth Edition, 1779. The fifth edition was published in 1794, and the sixth edition was published in 1820.
- The Statutes at Large, by Owen Ruffhead.
