= The Statutes at Large =

The Statutes at Large is the name given to published collections or series of legislative acts in a number of jurisdictions.

The expression "statutes at large" was first used in the edition of Barker published in 1587.

== England and Great Britain ==
- The Statutes at Large:
  - Edition by Owen Ruffhead, from "Magna Charta" down to the Acts of 4 Geo. 3: 9 volumes, London.
    "Printed for Mark Basket, Printer to the King's Most Excellent Majesty, and by the Assigns of Robert Basket; And by Henry Woodfall and William Strahan, Law Printers to the King's Most Excellent Majesty", 1763–1765.
  - Continuation of Ruffhead's edition, down to the Acts of 25 Geo. 3: 5 volumes, London.
    (Vols. 10–13) "Printed for Charles Eyre and William Strahan, Printers to the King's Most Excellent Majesty; And by W. Strahan and M. Woodfall, Law Printers to the King's Most Excellent Majesty", 1771–1780.
    (Vol. 14) "Printed by Charles Eyre and the Executors of William Strahan, Printers to the King's Most Excellent Majesty; And by W. Woodfall and the Executors of W. Strahan, Law Printers to the King's Most Excellent Majesty", 1786.
  - Republication of Ruffhead's edition, edited by Charles Runnington, down to the Acts of 25 Geo. 3: 10 volumes, London.
    "Printed by Charles Eyre and Andrew Strahan, Printers to the King's Most Excellent Majesty; And by William Woodfall and Andrew Strahan, Law Printers to the King's Most Excellent Majesty", 1786.
  - Continuation of Runnington's edition, down to 1800: 4 volumes, London.
    (Vols. 11 and 12) "Printed by Charles Eyre and Andrew Strahan, Printers to the King's Most Excellent Majesty; And by Andrew Strahan and William Woodfall, Law Printers to the King's Most Excellent Majesty", 1789–1794.
    (Vols. 13 and 14) "Printed by George Eyre and Andrew Strahan, Printers to the King's Most Excellent Majesty; And by Andrew Strahan, Law Printer to the King's Most Excellent Majesty", 1798–1800.
- The Statutes at Large, from Magna Charta to the End of the Eleventh Parliament of Great Britain, Anno 1761:
  - Edition by Danby Pickering, down to the Acts of 1 Geo. 3: 24 volumes, Cambridge.
    "Printed by Joseph Bentham, Printer to the University; for Charles Bathurst, at the Cross-Keys, opposite St Dunstan's Church in Fleet-Street, London", 1762–1766.
  - Continuation, from the Acts of 2 Geo. 3: 11 volumes, Cambridge.
    (Vols. 25–26) "Printed by Joseph Bentham (subsequently by John Archdeacon), Printer to the University; for Charles Bathurst, at the Cross-Keys, opposite St.Dunstan's Church in Fleet-Street, London", 1763–1764.
    (Vols. 27–35) "Printed by John Archdeacon, Printer to the University; for Charles Bathurst, at the Cross-Keys, opposite St.Dunstan's Church in Fleet-Street, London", 1767–1786.
    (Vols. 36–46) imprint varies, 1787–1807.

== United States ==
- United States Statutes at Large, an official annual publication of all Acts of Congress

== See also ==
- The Statutes of the Realm, a collection of all English and British Acts of Parliament from 1235 to the death of Queen Anne in 1713. Published in 9 volumes, together with 2 volumes of indices, between 1810 and 1825.
- Acts and Ordinances of the Interregnum, 1642–1660, a collection of the Ordinances and Acts passed without royal authority by the Parliament of England from 1642 to 1660.
- Legislation.gov.uk (formerly UK Statute Law Database)
