= Concealment of birth =

Failing to report the birth of a child, a crime in many countries

Concealment of birth is the act of a parent (or other responsible person) failing to report the birth of a child. The term is sometimes used to refer to hiding the birth of a child from friends or family, but is most often used when the appropriate authorities have not been informed about a stillbirth or the death of a newborn. This is a crime in many countries, with varying punishments.

== Australia ==
Australian Capital Territory

Section 47 of the Crimes Act 1900 creates the offence of concealment of birth.

New South Wales

Section 85 of the Crimes Act 1900 creates the offence of concealment of birth.

Northern Territory

Section 163 of the Criminal Code Act creates the offence of concealment of birth.

South Australia

Section 83 of the Criminal Law Consolidation Act 1935 creates the offence of concealment of birth.

Western Australia

Section 291 of the Criminal Code (Schedule to the Criminal Code Compilation Act 1913) creates the offence of concealing the birth of children.

Tasmania

Section 166 of the Criminal Code Act 1924 creates the offence of concealment of birth.

Victoria

Section 67 of the Crimes Act 1958 creates the offence of concealing birth of a child.

== Canada ==
Section 242 of the Canadian Criminal Code (injury to, or death of, a child due to its mother neglecting to obtain assistance in child birth with intent that it should not live or to conceal its birth). (English) (French)

Section 243 of that Code (concealing the dead body of a child with intent to its conceal birth). (English) (French)

== England and Wales, and Northern Ireland ==
In England and Wales, and in Northern Ireland, section 60 of the Offences Against the Person Act 1861 (24 & 25 Vict. c. 100) creates the offence of concealing the birth of a child:

If any woman shall be delivered of a child, every person who shall, by any secret disposition of the dead body of the said child, whether such child died before, at, or after its birth, endeavour to conceal the birth thereof, shall be guilty of a misdemeanor, and being convicted thereof shall be liable, at the discretion of the court, to be imprisoned for any term not exceeding two years, ...

The words "with or without hard labour" omitted in the first place were repealed for England and Wales by section 1(2) of the Criminal Justice Act 1948 (11 & 12 Geo. 6. c. 58).

The proviso to this section, as extended by any subsequent enactment, was repealed for England and Wales by section 10 of, and paragraph 13(1)(a) of schedule 2 to, and part III of schedule 3 to, the Criminal Law Act 1967. Originally, the proviso allowed the jury to find an alternative verdict of this offence on a charge of murder. In England and Wales, it was subsequently extended to allow the jury to find an alternative verdict of this offence on a charge of child destruction or a charge of infanticide.

Concealment of Birth of Bastards Act 1623
- Act of Parliament
- Parliament of England
- Long title: An Act to prevent the destroying and murthering of bastard children.
- Citation: 21 Jas. 1. c. 27
- Territorial extent: England and Wales

Dates
- Royal assent: 29 May 1624
- Commencement: 29 June 1624 (Note: Section 1. One month after the end of the session of parliament.)
- Repealed: 1 July 1803
Other legislation
Amended by	Continuance of Laws, etc. Act 1627
Repealed by	Malicious Shooting or Stabbing Act 1803
Relates to	Concealment of Birth of Bastards Act 1707; Offences Against the Person Act 1828; Offences Against the Person (Ireland) Act 1829; Offences Against the Person Act 1861; Infanticide Act 1922; Infant Life (Preservation) Act 1929; Infanticide Act 1938; Criminal Law Act 1967

Status: Repealed

Text of statute as originally enacted

Concealment of Birth of Bastards Act 1707
- Act of Parliament
- Parliament of Ireland
- Long title: Act to prevent the destroying and murthering of Bastard Children.
- Citation: 6 Anne c. 4 (I)
- Territorial extent: Ireland

Dates
- Royal assent: 24 October 1707
- Commencement: 1 November 1707 (Note: Section 1.)
- Repealed: 1 July 1803
Other legislation
Repealed by	Malicious Shooting or Stabbing Act 1803
Relates to	Concealment of Birth of Bastards Act 1623; Offences Against the Person Act 1828; Offences Against the Person (Ireland) Act 1829; Offences Against the Person Act 1861; Infanticide Act 1922; Infant Life (Preservation) Act 1929; Infanticide Act 1938; Criminal Law Act 1967

Status: Repealed

Text of statute as originally enacted

Section 60 of the Offences Against the Person Act 1861 (24 & 25 Vict. c. 100) is framed on section 14 of the Offences Against the Person Act 1828 (9 Geo. 4. c. 31) (which applied to England, including Wales and Berwick) and section 17 of the Offences Against the Person (Ireland) Act 1829 (10 Geo. 4. c. 34), which applied to Ireland.

This offence was previously created by section 4 of Lord Ellenborough's Act (43 Geo. 3. c. 58). Section 3 of the act repealed the Concealment of Birth of Bastards Act 1623 (21 Jas. 1. c. 27) and the Concealment of Birth of Bastards Act 1707 (6 Anne c. 4 (I)), which applied to England and Wales and Ireland, respectively.

The words "if any woman shall be delivered of a child, every person" were retained in section 60 after a division in the select committee of the House of Commons, and the members were equally divided upon the subject. The word "secret" was in like manner retained after a division in the committee.

An offence under section 60 of the Offences Against the Person Act 1861 (24 & 25 Vict. c. 100) could not be tried at Quarter Sessions.

Section 31 of the Offences Against the Person Act 1828 (9 Geo. 4. c. 31) made provision in relation to any person who should counsel, aid or abet the commission of, amongst other things, a misdemeanour under section 14.

== South Africa ==
In South Africa, section 113 of the General Law Amendment Act, 1935, amended by the Judicial Matters Amendment Act 66, 2008, creates the offence of concealing the birth of a child:

Concealment of birth of newly born child

113. (1) Any person who, without a lawful burial order, disposes of the body of any newly born child with intent to conceal the fact of its birth, whether the child died before, during or after birth, shall be guilty of an offence and liable on conviction to a fine or to imprisonment for a period not exceeding three years.

(2) A person may be convicted under subsection (1) although it has not been proved that the child in question died before its body was disposed of.

== United States ==
In the United States, concealing birth was once a crime punishable by capital punishment. In 1785, Hannah Piggen from Massachusetts was the last person to be put to death for concealing the birth/death of an infant.

Concealing birth remains illegal in many states. Its seriousness as a crime, however, differs from state to state, ranging from a felony in Arkansas to a misdemeanor in Washington.
