= Offences Against the Person Act 1828 =

Act of the Parliament of the United Kingdom

- Act of Parliament
- Parliament of the United Kingdom
- Long title: An Act for consolidating and amending the Statutes in England relative to Offences against the Person.
- Citation: 9 Geo. 4. c. 31
- Introduced by: Sir Robert Peel MP (Commons); Henry Petty-Fitzmaurice, 3rd Marquess of Lansdowne (Lords)
- Territorial extent: England and Wales (Note: Section 1.)

Dates
- Royal assent: 27 June 1828
- Commencement: 1 July 1828 (Note: Section 1.)
- Repealed: 1 November 1861
Other legislation
Amends	See § Repealed enactments
Repeals/revokes	See § Repealed enactments
Amended by	Offences Against the Person Act 1837; Substitution of Punishments of Death Act 1841
Repealed by	Criminal Statutes Repeal Act 1861
Relates to	Criminal Law Act 1827; Criminal Statutes Repeal Act 1827; Larceny Act 1827; Malicious Injuries to Property Act 1827; Remedies against the Hundred Act 1827; Criminal Statutes (Ireland) Repeal Act 1828; Criminal Law (India) Act 1828; Offences Against the Person (Ireland) Act 1829; Criminal Law Consolidation Acts 1861; Forgery Act 1830; Coinage Offences Act 1832; Offences Against the Person Act 1837; Accessories and Abettors Act 1861; Criminal Statutes Repeal Act 1861; Larceny Act 1861; Malicious Damage Act 1861; Forgery Act 1861; Coinage Offences Act 1861; Offences Against the Person Act 1861

Status: Repealed

History of passage through Parliament

Records of Parliamentary debate relating to the statute from Hansard

Text of statute as originally enacted

The Offences Against the Person Act 1828 (9 Geo. 4. c. 31), also known as Lord Lansdowne's Act, was an act of the Parliament of the United Kingdom that consolidated for England and Wales provisions in the law related to offences against the person (an expression which, in particular, includes offences of violence) from a number of earlier piecemeal statutes into a single act. Among the laws it replaced was clause XXXVI of Magna Carta, the first time any part of Magna Carta was repealed, and the Buggery Act 1533 (25 Hen. 8. c. 6). The act also abolished the crime of petty treason.

The act was one of Peel's Acts which consolidated, repealed and replaced a large number of existing statutes.

Similar provision was made for Ireland by the Offences Against the Person (Ireland) Act 1829 (10 Geo. 4. c. 34) and for India by the Criminal Law (India) Act 1828 (9 Geo. 4. c. 74).

== Background ==
In the United Kingdom, acts of Parliament remain in force until expressly repealed. Blackstone's Commentaries on the Laws of England, published in the late 18th-century, raised questions about the system and structure of the common law and the poor drafting and disorder of the existing statute book.

In 1806, the Commission on Public Records passed a resolution requesting the production of a report on the best mode of reducing the volume of the statute book. From 1810 to 1825, The Statutes of the Realm was published, providing for the first time the authoritative collection of acts. In 1816, both Houses of Parliament, passed resolutions that an eminent lawyer with 20 clerks be commissioned to make a digest of the statutes, which was declared "very expedient to be done." However, this was never done.

In 1822, Sir Robert Peel entered the cabinet as home secretary and in 1826 introduced a number of reforms to the English criminal law, which became known as Peel's Acts. This included efforts to modernise, consolidate and repeal provisions from a large number of earlier statutes, including:

- Benefit of clergy
- Larceny and other offences of stealing
- Burglary, robbery and threats for the purpose of robbery or of extortion
- Embezzlement, false pretences, and the receipt of stolen property
- Malicious injuries to property
- Remedies against the hundred

In 1827, several acts were passed for this purpose, territorially limited to England and Wales and Scotland, including:

- Criminal Statutes Repeal Act 1827 (7 & 8 Geo. 4 c. 27), which repealed for England and Wales over 140 enactments relating to the criminal law
- Criminal Law Act 1827 (7 & 8 Geo. 4 c. 28), which modernised the administration of criminal justice.
- Larceny Act 1827 (7 & 8 Geo. 4 c. 29), which consolidated provisions in the law relating to larceny.
- Malicious Injuries to Property Act 1827 (7 & 8 Geo. 4 c. 30), which consolidated provisions in the law relating to malicious injuries to property.

== Passage ==
In an address to Parliament titled State of the Common Law on 29 February 1828, the home secretary, Sir Robert Peel MP stated that during his absence from office, work had been done to prepare reforms related to offences against the person, as part of broader ongoing efforts to reform and consolidate the criminal law.

The Offences against the Person Bill was presented by Henry Petty-Fitzmaurice, 3rd Marquess of Lansdowne and had its first reading in the House of Lords on 3 March 1828. The bill had its second reading in the House of Lords on 18 March 1828. In his speech introducing the bill, Lord Lansdowne, outlined several key changes to the law regarding offences against the person to at modernise and clarifying existing laws while addressing gaps and inconsistencies in the current system, including:

1. Consolidating 56 existing enactments related to offences against the person into a single comprehensive bill.
2. Reclassifying petty treason as murder, removing certain legal privileges for those accused of petty treason.
3. Expanding the definition of attempted murder to include methods beyond shooting, stabbing, or cutting, such as strangling and drowning.
4. Equalizing the punishment for procuring abortion, regardless of whether the woman was 'quick with child' or not.
5. Making the concealment of a bastard child a separate offence from murder.
6. Expanding the crime of abduction to cover females with any property interest, not just heiresses.
7. Giving judges discretionary power in sentencing for the offence of abandoning seamen on foreign shores.

The bill was committed to a committee of the whole house, which met on 28 March 1828 and reported with amendments on 3 April 1828. The amended bill had its third reading in the House of Lords on 15 April 1828, with amendments. Specifically, an amendment by Charles Grey, 2nd Earl Grey, to retain the punishment of dissection for executed murderers, was accepted.

The amended bill had its first reading in the House of Commons on 17 April 1828. The bill had its second reading in the House of Commons on 21 April 1828, introduced by the home secretary, Sir Robert Peel MP. The bill was committed to a committee of the whole house, which met and reported on 5 May 1828, with amendments. The amended bill was considered by the House of Commons on 16 May 1828 and was re-committed to a committee of the whole house, which met and reported on 16 May 1828, with amendments. The re-amended bill was considered by the House of Commons and was re-committed to a committee of the whole house on 23 May 1828 which met on 23 May 1828 and reported on 30 May 1828, with amendments. The amended bill had its third reading in the House of Lords on 6 June 1828.

The amended bill was considered and agreed to by the House of Lords on 19 June 1828, with further amendments. The amended bill was considered and agreed to by the House of Commons on 25 June 1828.

The bill was granted royal assent on 27 June 1828.

== Provisions ==
Section 1 of the act repealed acts from 1225 (9 Hen. 3. c. 26) to 1822 (3 Geo. 4. c. 114). Beside repealing, simplifying and consolidating the statute law, the act contained changes to the law.

Section 2 of the act abolished the distinctive offence of petty treason, providing that petty treason should be treated as murder.

Section 11 of the act extended the provisions in Lord Ellenborough's Act (43 Geo. 3. c. 58), removing the requirement that an offensive weapon must be used in the commission of a violent offence, so that murder by drowning, suffocation or strangulation were now considered just as serious as murder by shooting, stabbing or poisoning. For the first time, all acts of attempted murder were categorized and treated as equivalent crimes of violence by the degree of harm done to the victim, rather than by the narrower scope of whether a specific offensive weapon had been used. This consolidation put the focus on the unacceptability of the violence itself, and not just the real or potential physical injuries that resulted.

Section 14 of the act made the concealment of the birth of a child a misdemeanour, whether by a single or married woman.

Section 15 of the act extended the crime of bestiality to "animals", not "beasts", therefore including birds or reptiles.

Section 18 of the act removed the requirement for victims of rape to prove ejaculation.

Section 19 of the act made the forcible abduction of women with intent to marry (as opposed to actual marriage) a felony and increased the penalty for abduction of a girl under 16 to such a fine or imprisonment as the Court shall award (as opposed to only two years or a fine under the Abduction Act 1557 (4 & 5 P. & M. c. 8)

The act also made assault a serious and more easily prosecutable crime. Prior to the act, society tolerated a degree of violence such as duelling, and what was considered to be the male right to physically discipline a spouse, children, and anyone of a lower social order, such as servants. Due to the costs of prosecution, which fell to the victim and could only be recouped on conviction, very few assault cases were brought to trial; they were usually seen as private matters to be resolved before, or mediated by a magistrate during, the process.

== Legacy ==
=== Legal significance ===
The act has been described by historian as Gregory Smith as "the first truly comprehensive piece of legislation designed to address interpersonal violence in British society". The act was significant in categorising punishments for interpersonal violence by harm instead of means, for example in equating all acts of attempted murder.

Under the Offences Against the Person act 1828, several sections pertained to the crime of rape. The penalty for being convicted of rape was still death, and remained so until 1841. The act also made it a felony punishable by death to carnally know a girl under the age of ten. Carnally knowing a girl over the age of ten and under the age of twelve was a misdemeanour punishable with imprisonment with the option of hard labour for a term to be determined by the court.

The act also affirmed that proof of penetration was sufficient to reach the conclusion that one person had had carnal knowledge of another; before the 1828 statute, victims of rape had to prove that the perpetrator ejaculated. It has been argued that medical experts used ejaculation as proof of rape because it was tangible evidence that reduced the need for a victim's testimony. Some historians also contend that requiring proof of ejaculation allowed judges and magistrates to ask victims humiliating and explicit questions.This change made it easier for victims to testify, and allowed for more victims to see justice. Records show that from 1828 to 1841, 63 defendants accused of rape were tried at the Old Bailey. Of those 63 defendants, 16 were found guilty and 12 were sentenced to death. Three had their sentences reduced to imprisonment, and one had his judgment respited altogether.

The act and its focus on interpersonal violence also had the effect of increasing formal accusations of domestic violence, by reducing the stigma surrounding such activity and diminishing judicial delays.

=== Subsequent developments ===
At the start of the parliamentary session in 1853, Lord Cranworth announced his intention to the improvement of the statute law and in March 1853, appointed the Board for the Revision of the Statute Law to repeal expired statutes and continue consolidation, with a wider remit that included civil law. The Board issued three reports, recommending the creation of a permanent body for statute law reform.

In 1854, Lord Cranworth appointed the Royal Commission for Consolidating the Statute Law to consolidate existing statutes and enactments of English law. The Commission made four reports. Recommendations made by the Commission were implemented by the Repeal of Obsolete Statutes Act 1856 (19 & 20 Vict. c. 64).

On 17 February 1860, the Attorney General, Sir Richard Bethell told the House of Commons that he had engaged Sir Francis Reilly and A. J. Wood to expurgate the statute book of all acts which, though not expressly repealed, were not in force, working backwards from the present time.

In 1861, bills were introduced to consolidate and modernise the criminal law, drafted by Charles Sprengel Greaves across:

- Offences Against the Person
- Malicious Injuries to Property
- Larceny
- Forgery
- Coining
- Accessories and Abettors

In 1861, the Criminal Law Consolidation Acts were passed:

- Accessories and Abettors Act 1861 (24 & 25 Vict. c. 94)
- Criminal Statutes Repeal Act 1861 (24 & 25 Vict. c. 95)
- Larceny Act 1861 (24 & 25 Vict. c. 96)
- Malicious Damage Act 1861 (24 & 25 Vict. c. 97)
- Forgery Act 1861 (24 & 25 Vict. c. 98)
- Coinage Offences Act 1861 (24 & 25 Vict. c. 99)
- Offences Against the Person Act 1861 (24 & 25 Vict. c. 100)

=== Further repeals ===
The territorial extent of the act was limited to England and Wales. Section 1 of the Criminal Statutes (Ireland) Repeal Act 1828 (9 Geo. 4. c. 53) largely mirrored the act for Ireland, including repealing acts extended to Ireland by the passage of Poynings' Act 1495. Section 125 of the Criminal Law (India) Act 1828 (9 Geo. 4. c. 74) repealed for India all the enactments listed in the act.

A number of the act's provisions were repealed and replaced by the Offences Against the Person Act 1837 (7 Will. 4 & 1 Vict. c. 85). The death penalty for shooting, stabbing, cutting or wounding with intent (s.12), and for post-quickening abortions (s.13) under this act was abolished by repeal of those sections by section 1 of the 1837 act (sections 12 and 13 of this act were replaced by sections 4 and 6 of the 1837 act, respectively).

The death penalty for rape (s.16) and carnal knowledge of a girl under ten (s.17) was abolished by amendment of those sections by section 3 of the Substitution of Punishments of Death Act 1841 (4 & 5 Vict. c. 56). Section 18 made provision in relation to proof of carnal knowledge.

The whole act was repealed by section 1 of, and the schedule to, the Criminal Statutes Repeal Act 1861 (24 & 25 Vict. c. 95), which came into force on 1 November 1861. The act was replaced by the Offences Against the Person Act 1861 (24 & 25 Vict. c. 100).

The territorial terms of the act led to several acts being for the avoidance of doubt for Scotland repealed by later Statute Law Revision Acts, including the Statute Law Revision Act 1861 (24 & 25 Vict. c. 101).

== Repealed enactments ==
Section 1 of the act repealed 59 enactments listed in that section. The territorial extent of the repeal, to take effect on 1 July 1828, was limited to England and Wales and the jurisdiction of the Admiralty of England. Section 1 of the act also stated that for offences and other matters committed or done on or before 30 June 1828, the repealed acts will still apply as if the act had not been passed.

Citation	Short Title	Description	Extent of repeal
9 Hen. 3. c. 26 (Note: See 25 Edw. 1.)	Criminal writs	Great Charter made in the Ninth Year of the Reign of King Henry the Third.	As relates to Inquisitions of Life or Member.
52 Hen. 3. c. 25	Murder	A Statute made in the Fifty-second Year of the same Reign.	As relates to murder.
3 Edw. 1. c. 11	Inquests of murder	A Statute made in the Third Year of the Reign of King Edward the First.	As relates to Inquests of Murder and the Writ of Odio et Atiâ.
3 Edw. 1. c. 13	Rape	A Statute made in the Third Year of the Reign of King Edward the First.	As relates to ravishing or taking away by Force any Female as therein mentioned.
4 Ed. 1. st. 3. c. 5	N/A	A Statute made in the Fourth Year of the same Reign, intituled The Statute of Bigamy.	As relates to Bigamists.
6 Edw. 1. c. 9	Homicide	A Statute made in the Sixth Year of the same Reign.	As relates to any Person killing another by Misfortune or in his own Defence, or in other Manner without Felony.
13 Ed. 1. st. 1 c. 29	Writs of trespass, etc.	A Statute made at Westminster in the Thirteenth Year of the same Reign.	As relates to the Writ of Odio et Atia.
13 Ed. 1. st. 1 c. 34	Forfeiture of Dower, etc. Act 1285	A Statute made at Westminster in the Thirteenth Year of the same Reign.	As relates to Rape.
9 Ed. 2. st. 1. c. 3	Prohibition	A Statute made in the Ninth Year of the Reign of King Edward the Second, commonly called Articuli Cleri.	As relates to laying violent Hands on a Clerk.
18 Ed. 3. st. 3. c. 2	Bigamy	A Statute made in the Eighteenth Year of the Reign of King Edward the Third.	As relates to Bigamists.
25 Ed. 3. st. 5 c. 2	N/A	A Statute made in the Twenty-fifth Year of the same Reign.	As relates to Petit Treason.
50 Edw. 3. c. 5	Arrest of clergy	A Statute made in the Fiftieth Year of the same Reign.	As relates to the Arrest of Persons of Holy Church.
1 Ric. 2. c. 15	Arrest of clergy	A Statute made in the First Year of the Reign of King Richard the Second.	As relates to the like Arrests.
6 Ric. 2. st. 1. c. 6	Rape	A Statute made in the Sixth Year of the same Reign.	As relates to Ravishers, and to Women ravished.
5 Hen. 4. c. 5	Maiming	A Statute made in the Fifth Year of the Reign of King Henry the Fourth.	As relates to cutting the Tongues or putting out the Eyes of any the King's Liege People.
5 Hen. 4. c. 6	Assaulting Servants of Knights of Parliament	A Statute made in the Fifth Year of the Reign of King Henry the Fourth.	As relates to any Assault upon the Servant of a Knight of the Shire in Parliament.
2 H. 5. st. 1. c. 9	Murder, etc.	A Statute made in the Second Year of the Reign of King Henry the Fifth.	As relates to Persons fleeing for Murders, Manslaughters, Robberies, and Batteries.
11 Hen. 6. c. 11	Parliament Act 1433	A Statute made in the Eleventh Year of the Reign of King Henry the Sixth.	As relates to any Assault or Affray made to any Lord, Knight of the Shire, Citizen, or Burgess being and attending at the Parliament or other Council of the King.
3 Hen. 7. c. 2	Abduction of Women Act 1487	An Act passed in the Third Year of the Reign of King Henry the Seventh, intituled An Act against taking away of Women against their Wills.	The whole act.
3 Hen. 7. c. 14	King's Household Act 1487	An Act passed in the same Year, intituled An Act that the Steward, Treasurer, and Controller of the King's House, shall enquire of Offences done within the same.	The whole act.
12 Hen. 7. c. 7	Benefit of Clergy Act 1496	An Act passed in the Twelfth Year of the same Reign, intituled An Act to make some Offences Petty Treason.	The whole act.
24 Hen. 8. c. 5	Killing Murderers, Robbers, and Burglars Act 1532	An Act passed in the Twenty-fourth Year of the Reign of King Henry the Eighth, intituled An Act where a Man killing a Thief shall not forfeit his Goods.	The whole act.
25 Hen. 8. c. 6	Buggery Act 1533	An Act passed in the Twenty-fifth Year of the same Reign, intituled An Act for the Punishment of the Vice of Buggery.	The whole act.
33 Hen. 8. c. 12	Offences within the Court Act 1541	An Act passed in the Thirty-third Year of the same Reign, intituled An Act for Murther and malicious Bloodshed within the Court.	As relates to the Punishment of Manslaughter and of malicious Striking, by reason whereof Blood shall be shed. I.e., part of section 6 to section 18.
33 Hen. 8. c. 23	Criminal Law Act 1541	An Act passed in the same Year, intituled An Act to proceed by a Commission of Oyer and Determiner against such Persons as shall confess Treasons, without remanding the same to be tried in the same Shire where the Offence was committed.	The whole act.
1 Edw. 6. c. 12	Treason Act 1547	An Act passed in the First Year of the Reign of King Edward the Sixth, intituled An Act for the Repeal of certain Statutes concerning Treasons, Felonies, etc.	As relates to Petty Treason and Murder, and to Bigamists, but nothing therein now in force relating to Foreign Pleas or Dower. I.e., sections 10, 13, 16 and 22.
5 & 6 Edw. 6. c. 4	Brawling Act 1551	An Act passed in the Fifth and Sixth Years of the same Reign, intituled An Act against quarrelling and fighting in Churches and Churchyards.	As relates to the Punishment of Persons convicted of striking with any Weapon, or drawing any Weapon with Intent to strike as therein mentioned. I.e., section 3.
4 & 5 Ph. & M. c. 4	Accessories in Murder, etc. Act 1557	An Act passed in the Fourth and Fifth Years of the Reign of King Philip and Queen Mary, intituled An Act that Accessories in Murder and divers Felonies shall not have the Benefit of Clergy.	The whole act.
4 & 5 Ph. & M. c. 8	Abduction Act 1557	An Act passed in the same Years, intituled An Act for the Punishment of such as shall take away Maidens that be Inheritors, being within the Age of Sixteen Years, or that marry them without Consent of their Parents.	The whole act.
5 Eliz. 1. c. 4	Statute of Artificers 1562	An Act passed in the Fifth Year of the Reign of Queen Elizabeth, intituled An Act touching divers Orders for Artificers, Labourers, Servants of Husbandry, and Apprentices.	As relates to the Punishment of any Servant, Workman, or Labourer making any Assault or Affray as therein mentioned.
5 Eliz. 1. c. 17	Sodomy Act 1562	An Act passed in the same Year, intituled An Act for the Punishment of the Vice of Sodomy.	The whole act.
18 Eliz. 1. c. 8	Benefit of Clergy Act 1575	An Act passed in the Eighteenth Year of the same Reign, intituled An Act to take away Clergy from the Offenders in Rape and Burglary, and an Order for the Delivery of Clerks convict without Purgation.	The whole act.
39 Eliz. 1. c. 9	Abduction Act 1597	An Act passed in the Thirty-ninth Year of the same Reign, intituled An Act for taking away of Clergy from Offenders against a certain Statute made in the Third Year of the Reign of King Henry the Seventh, concerning the taking away of Women against their Wills unlawfully.	The whole act.
1 Jas. 1. c. 8 (Note: Vulgo)	Statute of Stabbing 1603	An Act passed in the First Vulgo Year of the Reign of King James the First, intituled An Act to take away the Benefit of Clergy from some Kind of Manslaughter.	The whole act.
1 Jas. 1. C. 11 (Note: Vulgo)	Bigamy Act 1603	An Act passed in the same Year, intituled An Act to restrain all Persons Vulgo from Marriage until their former Wives and former Husbands be dead.	The whole act.
22 & 23 Cha. 2. c. 1	Maiming Act 1670	An Act passed in the Twenty-second and Twenty-third Years of the Reign of King Charles the Second, intituled An Act to prevent malicious Maiming and Wounding.	The whole act.
22 & 23 Cha. 2. c. 11	Piracy Act 1670	An Act passed in the same Years, intituled An Act to prevent the Delivery up of Merchant Ships, and for the Increase of good and serviceable Shipping.	As relates to any Mariner laying violent Hands on his Commander, as therein mention. I.e., section 9.
11 & 12 Will. 3. c. 7 (Note: Vulgo)	Piracy Act 1698	An Act passed in the Eleventh Year of the Reign of King William the Third, intituled An Act for the more effectual Suppression of Piracy.	As relates to any Master of a Merchant Vessel, who shall force any Man on Shore, or wilfully leave him behind, or refuse to bring Home any Man as therein mentioned. I.e., section 18.
9 Ann. c. 14	Gaming Act 1710	An Act passed in the Ninth Year of the Reign of Queen Anne, intituled An Act for the better preventing of excessive and deceitful Gaming.	As relates to the Forfeiture and Punishment of any Person assaulting and beating or challenging or provoking to fight any other Person on account of any Money won as therein mentioned. I.e., section 8.
9 Ann. c. 16	Assaulting a Privy Counsellor Act 1710	An Act passed in the same Year, intituled An Act to make an Attempt on the Life of a Privy Councillor in the Execution of his Office to be a Felony without Benefit of Clergy.	The whole act.
12 Geo. 1. c. 34	Woollen Manufactures Act 1725	An Act passed in the Twelfth Year of the Reign of King George the First, intituled An Act to prevent unlawful Combinations of Workmen employed in the Woollen Manufactures, and for better Payment of their Wages.	As creates any Felony. I.e., section 6.
2 Geo. 2. c. 21	Murder Act 1728	An Act passed in the Second Year of the Reign of King George the Second, intituled An Act for the Trial of Murders in Cases where either the Stroke or Death only happens within that Part of Great Britain called England.	The whole act.
11 Geo. 2 c. 22	Corn Exportation Act 1737	An Act passed in the Eleventh Year of the same Reign, intituled An Act for punishing such Persons as shall do Injuries and Violences to the Persons or Properties of His Majesty's Subjects, with Intent to hinder the Exportation of Corn.	As relates to any Person who shall beat, wound, or use any other Violence to any Person or Driver, and so much thereof as makes any Second Offence Felony. I.e., part of sections 1 and 2.
22 Geo. 2. c. 27	Frauds by Workmen Act 1748	An Act passed in the Twenty-second Year of the same Reign, intituled An Act for the more effectual preventing of Frauds and Abuses committed by Persons employed in the Manufacture of Hats, and in the Woollen, Linen, Fustian, Cotton, Iron, Leather, Fur, Hemp, Flax, Mohair, and Silk Manufactures; and for pre- venting unlawful Combinations of Journeymen Dyers and Journeymen Hotpressers, and of all Persons employed in the said several Manufactures, and for the better Payment of their Wages.	As extends to the Persons therein mentioned that the Act of the Twelfth Year of King George the First which is hereinbefore referred to. I.e., part of section 12.
25 Geo. 2. c. 37	Murder Act 1751	An Act passed in the Twenty- fifth Year of the Reign of King George the Second, intituled An Act for better preventing the horrid Crime of Murder.	Except so far as relates to Rescues and Attempts to rescue. I.e., except sections 9 and 10.
26 Geo. 2. c. 19	Stealing Shipwrecked Goods Act 1753	An Act passed in the Twenty-sixth Year of the same Reign, intituled An Act for enforcing the Laws against Persons who steal or detain Shipwrecked Goods, and for the Relief of Persons suffering Loss thereby.	As relates to any Person who shall be assaulted, beaten, and wounded for the Exercise of his Duty in the Salvage of any Vessel, Goods, or Effects, as therein mentioned. I.e., section 11.
30 Geo. 3. c. 48	Treason Act 1790	An Act passed in the Thirtieth Year of the Reign of King George the Third, intituled An Act for discontinuing the Judgment which has been required by Law to be given against Women convicted of certain Crimes, and substituting another Judgment in lieu thereof.	As relates to Petit Treason.
33 Geo. 3. c. 67	Shipping Offences Act 1793	An Act passed in the Thirty-third Year of the same Reign, intituled An Act for better preventing Offences in obstructing, destroying, or damaging Ships or other Vessels, and in obstructing Seamen, Keelmen, Casters, and Ship Carpenters from pursuing their lawful Occupations.	As relates to any Seaman, Keelman, Caster, Ship Carpenter, or other Person, who shall prevent, hinder, or obstruct, or assault, beat, wound, or do any bodily Violence or Hurt to any Seaman, Keelman, Caster, or Ship Carpenter, as therein particularly mentioned. I.e., section 2.
35 Geo. 3. c. 67	Bigamy Act 1795	An Act passed in the Thirty-fifth Year of the same Reign, intituled An Act for rendering more effectual an Act passed in the First Year of the Reign of King James the First, intituled ' An Act to restrain all Persons from Marriage until their former Wives and former Husbands be dead.	The whole act.
36 Geo. 3. c. 9	Passage of Grain Act 1795	An Act passed in the Thirty- sixth Year of the same Reign, intituled An Act to prevent Obstructions to the free Passage of Grain within the Kingdom.	As relates to any Person who shall beat, wound, or use any other Violence to any Person or Driver, and so much thereof as makes any Second Offence Felony. I.e., part of section 1 and 2.
43 Geo. 3. c. 58	Malicious Shooting or Stabbing Act 1803	An Act passed in the Forty- third Year of the same Reign, intituled An Act for the further Prevention of malicious shooting, and attempting to discharge loaded Fire Arms, stabbing, cutting, wounding, poisoning, and the malicious using of Means to procure the Miscarriage of Women, and also the malicious setting fire to Buildings; and also for repealing a certain Act made in England in the Twenty-first Year of the late King James the First, intituled An Act to prevent the destroying and murthering of Bastard Children,' and also an Act made in Ireland in the Sixth Year of the Reign of the late Queen Anne, also intituled An Act to prevent the destroying and murthering of Bastard Children, and for making other Provisions in lieu thereof.	The whole act.
43 Geo. 3. c. 113	Casting Away of Vessels, etc. Act 1803	An Act passed in the same Forty-third Year, intituled An Act for the more effectually providing for the Punishment of Offences in wilfully casting away, burning, or destroying Ships and Vessels, and for the more convenient Trial of Accessories in Felonies, and for extending the Powers of an Act made in the Thirty- third Year of the Reign of King Henry the Eighth, as far as relates to Murders, to Accessories to Mur, and to Manslaughters.	The whole act. (Note: This Act was repealed in whole by the Statute Law Revision Act 1861. The Notes to the Statute Law Revision Act 1861 state: "Repealed As to England by 9 Geo. 4. c. 31. s. 1. As to India by 9 Geo. 4. c. 74. s. 125. Semble, the Act entered in Col. 1. does not apply to Scotland; but see the expression "this realm" in s. 7. (Repealed 7 Geo. 4. c. 64. s. 32. in part by 8 & 9 Geo. 4. c. 27. s. 1.)")
54 Geo. 3. c. 101	Child Stealing Act 1814	An Act passed in the Fifty-fourth Year of the Reign of King George the Third, intituled An Act for the more effectual Prevention of Child-stealing	The whole act.
58 Geo. 3. c. 38	Relief of Sailors Abroad Act 1818	An Act passed in the Fifty-eighth Year of the same Reign, intituled An Act to extend and render more effectual the present Regulations for the Relief of seafaring Men and Boys, Subjects of the United Kingdom of Great Britain and Ireland, in Foreign Parts.	As relates to the Trial of Offences against the Act of King William the Third, hereinbefore mentioned. I.e., section 1.
1 Geo. 4. c. 90	Offences at Sea Act 1820	An Act passed in the First Year of the Reign of His present Majesty, intituled An Act to remove Doubts and to remedy Defects in the Law, with respect to certain Offences committed upon the Sea or within the Jurisdiction of the Admiralty.	As refers to the Act of the Forty- third Year of the Reign of King George the Third, hereinbefore first mentioned. I.e., section 2.
1 Geo. 4. c. 115	Capital Punishment Act 1820	An Act passed in the same First Year, intituled An Act to repeal so much of the several Acts passed in the Thirty- ninth Year of the Reign of Elizabeth, the Fourth of George the First, the Fifth and Eighth of George the Second, as inflicts Capital Punishment on certain Offences therein specified, and to provide more suitable and effectual Punishment for such Offences.	The whole act. (Note: This Act was repealed in whole by the Statute Law Revision Act 1861. The Notes to the Statute Law Revision Act 1861 state: "Repealed as to England, by 9 Geo. 4. c. 31. s. 1. as to India, by 9 Geo. 4. c. 74. s. 125. Indexed by the King's Printers as relating to the United Kingdom. It is conceived that it does not apply to Scotland. It does not apply to Ireland. (Repealed in 5 Geo. 4. c. 98. s.1. part by 6 Geo. 4. c.16. s.1. 7 & 8 Geo. 4. c. 27. s.1.)")
1 & 2 Geo. 4. c. 88	Rescue Act 1821	An Act passed in the First and Second Years of the present Reign, intituled An Act for the Amendment of the Law of Rescue.	As relates to the Offences of assaulting, beating, and wounding therein mentioned. I.e., section 2.
3 Geo. 4. c. 38	Punishment for Manslaughter, etc. Act 1822	An Act passed in the Third Year of the present Reign, intituled An Act for the further and more adequate Punishment of Persons convicted of Manslaughter, and of Servants convicted of robbing their Masters, and of Accessories before the Fact of Grand Larceny, and certain other Felonies.	The whole act. (Note: This Act was repealed in whole by the Statute Law Revision Act 1861. The Notes to the Statute Law Revision Act 1861 state: "Repealed As to England by 9 Geo. 4. c. 31. s. 1. As to India by 9 Geo. 4. c. 74. s. 125. As to Ireland by 10 Geo. 4. c. 34. s. 1. Semble, the Act entered in Col. 1. does not extend to Scotland. (Repealed in part, except as to Scotland or Ireland, by 7 Geo. 4. c. 64. s. 32. Repealed in part As to England by 7 & 8 Geo. 4. c. 27. As to Ireland by 9 Geo. 4. c. 53. s.1.)")
3 Geo. 4. c. 114	Hard Labour Act 1822	An Act passed in the same Year, intituled An Act to provide for the more effectual Punishment of certain Offences by Imprisonment with hard Labour.	As relates to any of the Assaults therein mentioned.

== See also ==
- Offences Against the Person Act
- Benefit of clergy
- Halsbury's Statutes
- Statute Law Revision Act
