= Offences Against the Person (Ireland) Act 1829 =

Act of the Parliament of the United Kingdom

- Act of Parliament
- Parliament of the United Kingdom
- Long title: An Act for consolidating and amending the Statutes in Ireland relating to Offences against the Person.
- Citation: 10 Geo. 4. c. 34
- Introduced by: Lord Francis Leveson Gower MP; Sir George Hill, 2nd Baronet MP; (Commons); Anthony Ashley-Cooper, 7th Earl of Shaftesbury (Lords)
- Territorial extent: United Kingdom

Dates
- Royal assent: 4 June 1829
- Commencement: 1 September 1829 (Note: Section 1.)
- Repealed: 1 November 1861
Other legislation
Amends	See § Repealed enactments
Repeals/revokes	See § Repealed enactments
Amended by	Summary Jurisdiction (Ireland) Act 1850
Repealed by	Criminal Statutes Repeal Act 1861
Relates to	Criminal Law Act 1827; Criminal Statutes Repeal Act 1827; Larceny Act 1827; Malicious Injuries to Property Act 1827; Remedies against the Hundred Act 1827; Offences Against the Person Act 1828; Criminal Statutes (Ireland) Repeal Act 1828; Criminal Law (India) Act 1828; Forgery Act 1830; Coinage Offences Act 1832; Offences Against the Person Act 1837; Accessories and Abettors Act 1861; Criminal Statutes Repeal Act 1861; Larceny Act 1861; Malicious Damage Act 1861; Forgery Act 1861; Coinage Offences Act 1861; Offences Against the Person Act 1861

Status: Repealed

Text of statute as originally enacted

The Offences Against the Person (Ireland) Act 1829 (10 Geo. 4. c. 34), also known as the Offences Against the Person Act (Ireland) 1829, was an act of the Parliament of the United Kingdom that consolidated for Ireland enactments related to offences against the person (an expression which, in particular, includes offences of violence) from a number of earlier piecemeal statutes into a single act.

The act included repeals mirroring for Ireland the Offences Against the Person Act 1828 (9 Geo. 4 c. 31), including repealing acts of the Parliament of England extended to Ireland by Poynings' Act 1495.

Similar provision was made for India by the Criminal Law (India) Act 1828 (9 Geo. 4. c. 74).

== Background ==
In the United Kingdom, acts of Parliament remain in force until expressly repealed. Blackstone's Commentaries on the Laws of England, published in the late 18th-century, raised questions about the system and structure of the common law and the poor drafting and disorder of the existing statute book.

In 1806, the Commission on Public Records passed a resolution requesting the production of a report on the best mode of reducing the volume of the statute book. From 1810 to 1825, The Statutes of the Realm was published, providing for the first time the authoritative collection of acts. In 1816, both Houses of Parliament, passed resolutions that an eminent lawyer with 20 clerks be commissioned to make a digest of the statutes, which was declared "very expedient to be done." However, this was never done.

In 1822, Sir Robert Peel entered the cabinet as home secretary and in 1826 introduced a number of reforms to the English criminal law, which became known as Peel's Acts. This included efforts to modernise, consolidate and repeal provisions from a large number of earlier statutes, including:

- Benefit of Clergy
- Larceny and other Offences of Stealing
- Burglary, Robbery and Threats for the Purpose of Robbery or of Extortion
- Embezzlement, False Pretences, and the Receipt of Stolen Property
- Malicious Injuries to Property
- Remedies against the Hundred

In 1827, several acts were passed for this purpose, territorially limited to England and Wales and Scotland, including:

- Criminal Statutes Repeal Act 1827 (7 & 8 Geo. 4. c. 27), which repealed for England and Wales over 140 enactments relating to the criminal law
- Criminal Law Act 1827 (7 & 8 Geo. 4. c. 28), which modernised the administration of criminal justice.
- Larceny Act 1827 (7 & 8 Geo. 4. c. 29), which consolidated provisions in the law relating to larceny.
- Malicious Injuries to Property Act 1827 (7 & 8 Geo. 4. c. 30), which consolidated provisions in the law relating to malicious injuries to property.

In 1828, parallel bills for Ireland to Peel's Acts were introduced, becoming:

- Criminal Statutes (Ireland) Repeal Act 1828 (9 Geo. 4. 54)
- Criminal Law (Ireland) Act 1828 (9 Geo. 4. 54)
- Larceny (Ireland) Act 1828 (9 Geo. 4. c. 55)
- Malicious Injuries to Property (Ireland) Act 1828 (9 Geo. 4. c. 56)

== Passage ==
Leave to bring in the Offences against the Person Bill to the House of Commons was granted on 4 May 1829 to the Chief Secretary for Ireland, Lord Francis Leveson Gower MP and Sir George Hill MP. The bill had its first reading in the House of Commons on 7 May 1829. The bill had its second reading in the House of Commons on 11 May 1829 and was committed to a committee of the whole house, which met and reported on 18 May 1829, with amendments. The amended bill was considered and agreed to by the House of Commons on 23 May 1829. The amended bill had its third reading in the House of Commons on 25 May 1829 and passed, without amendments.

The bill had its first reading in the House of Lords on 30 May 1829. The bill had its second reading in the House of Lords on 1 June 1829, introduced by Anthony Ashley-Cooper, 7th Earl of Shaftesbury, and was committed to a committee of the whole house, which met and reported on 2 June 1829, without amendments. The bill had its third reading in the House of Lords on 3 June 1829 and passed, without amendments.

The bill was granted royal assent on 4 June 1829.

== Subsequent developments ==
The territorial extent of the act was limited to Ireland. All enactments listed in the act were repealed for India by section 125 of the Criminal Law (India) Act 1828 (9 Geo. 4. c. 74).

The territorial terms of the act led to several acts being for the avoidance of doubt for Scotland repealed by later Statute Law Revision Acts, including the Statute Law Revision Act 1861 (24 & 25 Vict. c. 101).

At the start of the parliamentary session in 1853, Lord Cranworth announced his intention to the improvement of the statute law and in March 1853, appointed the Board for the Revision of the Statute Law to repeal expired statutes and continue consolidation, with a wider remit that included civil law. The Board issued three reports, recommending the creation of a permanent body for statute law reform.

In 1854, Lord Cranworth appointed the Royal Commission for Consolidating the Statute Law to consolidate existing statutes and enactments of English law. The commission made four reports. Recommendations made by the commission were implemented by the Repeal of Obsolete Statutes Act 1856 (19 & 20 Vict. c. 64).

On 17 February 1860, the Attorney General, Sir Richard Bethell MP told the House of Commons that he had engaged Sir Francis Reilly and A. J. Wood to expurgate the statute book of all acts which, though not expressly repealed, were not in force, working backwards from the present time.

In 1861, bills were introduced to consolidate and modernise the criminal law, drafted by Charles Sprengel Greaves across:

- Offences Against the Person
- Malicious Injuries to Property
- Larceny
- Forgery
- Coining
- Accessories and Abettors

In 1861, the Criminal Law Consolidation Acts were passed:

- Accessories and Abettors Act 1861 (24 & 25 Vict. c. 94)
- Criminal Statutes Repeal Act 1861 (24 & 25 Vict. c. 95)
- Larceny Act 1861 (24 & 25 Vict. c. 96)
- Malicious Damage Act 1861 (24 & 25 Vict. c. 97)
- Forgery Act 1861 (24 & 25 Vict. c. 98)
- Coinage Offences Act 1861 (24 & 25 Vict. c. 99)
- Offences Against the Person Act 1861 (24 & 25 Vict. c. 100)

=== Repeal ===
So much of the act as related to the jurisdiction of Justices of the Peace as to summary convictions was repealed by section 60 of the Summary Jurisdiction (Ireland) Act 1850 (13 & 14 Vict. c. 102), which came into force on 1 October 1850.

The whole act was repealed by section 1 of, and the schedule to, the Criminal Statutes Repeal Act 1861 (24 & 25 Vict. c. 95), which came into force on 1 November 1861. It was wholly replaced by the Offences Against the Person Act 1861 (24 & 25 Vict. c. 100).

== Repealed enactments ==
Section 1 of the act repealed 50 enactments listed in that section. The territorial extent of the repeal, to take effect on 2 September 1829, was limited to Ireland and the Admiralty of England. Section 1 of the act also stated that for offences and other matters committed or done on or before 1 September 1829, the repealed acts will still apply as if the act had not been passed.

Section 2 of the act repealed all provisions in other laws that were designed to continue or perpetuate the acts being repealed by this legislation, to take effect on 1 September 1828.

Parliament of England
Citation	Short title	Description	Extent of Repeal
9 Hen. 3. c. 26 (Note: See 25 Edw. 1.)	Criminal writs	Great Charter made in the Ninth Year of the Reign of King Henry the Third.	As relates to Inquisitions of Life or Member.
52 Hen. 3. c. 25	Murder	A Statute made in the Fifty-second Year of the same Reign.	As relates to murder.
3 Edw. 1. c. 11	Inquests of murder	A Statute made in the Third Year of the Reign of King Edward the First.	As relates to Inquests of Murder and the Writ of Odio et Atiâ.
3 Edw. 1. c. 13	Rape	A Statute made in the Third Year of the Reign of King Edward the First.	As relates to ravishing or taking away by Force any Female as therein mentioned.
4 Ed. 1. st. 3. c. 5	N/A	A Statute made in the Fourth Year of the same Reign, intituled The Statute of Bigamy.	As relates to Bigamists.
6 Edw. 1. c. 9	Homicide	A Statute made in the Sixth Year of the same Reign.	As relates to any Person killing another by Misfortune or in his own Defence, or in other Manner without Felony.
13 Ed. 1. st. 1 c. 29	Writs of trespass, etc.	A Statute made at Westminster in the Thirteenth Year of the same Reign.	As relates to the Writ of Odio et Atia.
13 Ed. 1. st. 1 c. 34	Forfeiture of Dower, etc. Act 1285	A Statute made at Westminster in the Thirteenth Year of the same Reign.	As relates to Rape.
9 Ed. 2. st. 1. c. 3	Prohibition	A Statute made in the Ninth Year of the Reign of King Edward the Second, commonly called Articuli Cleri.	As relates to laying violent Hands on a Clerk.
18 Ed. 3. st. 3. c. 2	Bigamy	A Statute made in the Eighteenth Year of the Reign of King Edward the Third.	As relates to Bigamists.
25 Ed. 3. st. 5 c. 2	N/A	A Statute made in the Twenty-fifth Year of the same Reign.	As relates to Petit Treason.
50 Edw. 3. c. 5	Arrest of clergy	A Statute made in the Fiftieth Year of the same Reign.	As relates to the Arrest of Persons of Holy Church.
1 Ric. 2. c. 15	Arrest of clergy	A Statute made in the First Year of the Reign of King Richard the Second.	As relates to the like Arrests.
6 Ric. 2. st. 1. c. 6	Rape	A Statute made in the Sixth Year of the same Reign.	As relates to Ravishers, and to Women ravished.
5 Hen. 4. c. 5	Maiming	A Statute made in the Fifth Year of the Reign of King Henry the Fourth.	As relates to cutting the Tongues or putting out the Eyes of any the King's Liege People.
5 Hen. 4. c. 6	Assaulting Servants of Knights of Parliament	A Statute made in the Fifth Year of the Reign of King Henry the Fourth.	As relates to any Assault upon the Servant of a Knight of the Shire in Parliament.
2 H. 5. st. 1. c. 9	Murder, etc.	A Statute made in the Second Year of the Reign of King Henry the Fifth.	As relates to Persons fleeing for Murders, Manslaughters, Robberies, and Batteries.
11 Hen. 6. c. 11	Parliament Act 1433	A Statute made in the Eleventh Year of the Reign of King Henry the Sixth.	As relates to any Assault or Affray made to any Lord, Knight of the Shire, Citizen, or Burgess being and attending at the Parliament or other Council of the King.
3 Hen. 7. c. 2	Abduction of Women Act 1487	An Act passed in the Third Year of the Reign of King Henry the Seventh, intituled An Act against taking away of Women against their Wills.	The whole act.
3 Hen. 7. c. 14	King's Household Act 1487	An Act passed in the same Year, intituled An Act that the Steward, Treasurer, and Controller of the King's House, shall enquire of Offences done within the same.	The whole act.

Parliament of Ireland
Citation	Short title	Description	Extent of repeal
28 Hen. 6. c. 3 (I)	N/A	An Act passed in the Twenty-eighth Year of the Reign of King Henry the Sixth, intituled An Act that it shall be lawful to every liege Man to kill or take notorious Thieves, and Thieves found robbing, spoiling, or breaking Houses, or taken with the Manner.	The whole act.
8 Edw. 4. c. 1 (I)	N/A	An Act passed in the Eighth Year of the Reign of King Edward the Fourth, intituled An Act concerning Rape.	The whole act.
10 Hen. 7. c. 11 (I)	N/A	An Act passed in the Tenth Year of the Reign of King Henry the Seventh, intituled An Act that no Person take any Money or Amends for the Death or Murder of his Friend or Kinsman other than the King's Laws will.	As relates to the Payment of any Assault or Amends. I.e., section 1.
28 Eliz. 1. c. 2 (I)	Witchcraft Act 1586	An Act passed in the Twenty-eighth Year of the Reign of Queen Elizabeth, intituled An Act against Witchcraft and Sorcerie.	The whole act.
11, 12 & 13 Jas. 1. c. 3 (I)	Benefit of Clergy Act 1613	An Act passed in the Eleventh, Twelfth, and Thirteenth Years of the Reign of King James the First, intituled An Act for the taking away of Clergie in certain Cases of Felonie, and for Deliverie of Clearkes convict without Purgation.	The whole act.
10 Chas. 1. Sess. 2. c. 20 (I)	N/A	An Act passed in the Second Session of the Tenth Year of the Reign of King Charles the First, intituled An Act for the Punishment of the Vice of Buggery.	The whole act.
10 Chas. 1. Sess. 2. c. 21 (I)	N/A	An Act passed in the same Year of the same Reign, intituled An Act for the restrayning of all Persons from Marriage until their former Wives and former Husbands be dead.	The whole act.
10 Chas. 1. Sess. 3. c. 17 (I)	N/A	An Act passed in the Third Session of the same Year, intituled An Act for the Punishment of such as shall take away Maydens that be Inheritors, being within the Age of Sixteen Years, or marry them without the Consent of their Parents.	The whole act.
15 Chas. 1. Sess. 2. c. 9 (I) (Note: Also 15 Chas. 1 Sess. 2. c. 9.)	N/A	An Act passed in the Fifteenth Year of the same Reign, intituled An Act to discharge and free true Men from all Forfeitures for killing such as attempt to rob or murther them.	The whole act.
7 Will. 3. c. 11 (I)	N/A	An Act passed in the Seventh Year of the Reign of King William the Third, intituled An Act to take away the Benefit of Clergy from him that doth stab another not having a Weapon drawn.	The whole act.
6 Anne. c. 16 (I)	Abductions Act 1707	An Act passed in the Sixth Year of the Reign of Queen Anne, intituled An Act for the more effectual preventing the taking away and marrying Children against the Wills of their Parents or Guardians.	The whole act.
9 Anne. c. 6 (I)	Criminal Evidence Act 1710	An Act passed in the Ninth Year of the same Reign, intituled An Act for taking away the Benefit of Clergy in certain Cases, and for taking away the Book in all Cases, and for repealing Part of the Statute for transporting Felons.	As relates to the Offence of having carnal Knowledge of any Female Child. I.e., section 2.
12 Geo. 1. c. 3 (I)	Marriage Act 1725	An Act passed in the Twelfth Year of the Reign of King George the First, intituled An Act to prevent Marriages by degraded Clergymen and Popish Priests, and for preventing Marriages consummated from being avoided by Pre-contracts, and for the more effectual punishing of Bigamy.	As relates to the Offence of Bigamy. I.e., section 5.
11 Geo. 2. c. 8 (I)	N/A	An Act passed in the Eleventh Year of the Reign of King George the Second, intituled An Act to prevent malicious maiming and wounding, and to prevent carrying secret Arms.	The whole act.
19 Geo. 2. c. 13 (I)	Abductions Act 1745	An Act passed in the Nineteenth Year of the same Reign, intituled An Act for annulling all Marriages to be celebrated by any Popish Priest between Protestant and Protestant and between Protestant and Papist, and to amend and make more effectual an Act passed in this Kingdom, in the sixth Year of the Reign of Her late Majesty Queen Anne, intituled 'An Act for the more effectual preventing the taking away and marrying Children against the Wills of their Parents or Guardians'. (Note: 6 Ann. c. 16)	As relates to any Offenders thereby declared to be Felons. I.e., section 2.
11 Geo. 3. c. 7 (I)	Obstruction of Trade Act 1770	An Act passed in the Eleventh Year of the Reign of King George the Third, intituled 'An Act for punishing such Persons as shall do Injuries and Violences to the Persons or Properties of His Majesty's Subjects, with Intent to hinder the Exportation of Corn.	As relates to any Person who shall beat, wound, or use any other Violence to any Person or Driver, and so much thereof as makes any Second such Offence Felony. I.e., sections 1 and 2, partly.
13 & 14 Geo. 3. c. 45 (I)	N/A	An Act passed in the Thirteenth and Fourteenth Years of the Reign of King George the Third, intituled An Act to prevent malicious cutting and wounding, and to punish Offenders called Chalkers.	The whole act.
19 & 20 Geo. 3. c. 19 (I)	Obstruction of Trade Act 1779	An Act passed in the Nineteenth and Twentieth Years of the same Reign, intituled An Act to prevent Combinations, and for the further Encouragement of Trade.	As relates to any maiming or wounding, or to the Offence of horsing, colting, carrying in Procession, or endangering the Life of any Person. I.e., part of section 5.
23 & 24 Geo. 3. c. 48 (I)	N/A	An Act passed in the Twenty-third and Twenty-fourth Years of the same Reign, intituled An Act for the Amendment of the Law in relation to the Salvage of Ships and Goods stranded, or in danger of perishing at Sea.	As relates to any Assault, beating, or wounding. I.e., section 7.
31 Geo. 3. c. 17 (I)	Prisoners (Rescue) Act 1791	An Act passed in the Thirty-first Year of the same Reign, intituled An Act to prevent the horrid Crime of Murder, and to repeal an Act passed in the Tenth Year of King Henry the Seventh, intituled ' An Act to make Murder of Malice prepensed Treason,' and for repealing for repealing an Act made in the Ninth Year of Queen Anne, intituled 'An Act for bringing an Appeal in case of Murder, notwithstanding the Statute of King Henry the Seventh, whereby Murder is made High Treason'. (Note: 9 Ann. c. 4)	Save so much thereof as relates to Rescues or Attempts to rescue; and an Act passed in the Thirty- Sixth Year of the same Reign, intituled An Act to make conspiring to murder Felony without Benefit of Clergy. (Note: 10 Hen. 7 c. 21 (I).) I.e., except sections 10 and 11 repealing 10 Hen. 7. c. 21 (I).
36 Geo. 3. c. 31 (I)	Treason by Women Act (Ireland) 1796	An Act passed in the same Year, intituled An Act for discontinuing the Judgment which has been required by Law to be given against Women convicted of certain Crimes, and substituting another Judgment in lieu thereof.	As relates to Petit Treason.
38 Geo. 3. c. 57 (I)	Conspiracy to Murder Act 1798	An Act passed in the Thirty-eighth Year of the same Reign, intituled An Act to amend an Act passed in the Thirty-sixth Year of His present Majesty, intituled An Act to make conspiring to murder Felony without Benefit of Clergy.	The whole act.

Parliament of the United Kingdom
Citation	Short title	Description	Extent of repeal
43 G. 3. c. 58	Malicious Shooting or Stabbing Act 1803	An Act passed in the Forty- third Year of the same Reign, intituled An Act for the further Prevention of malicious shooting, and attempting to discharge loaded Fire Arms, stabbing, cutting, wounding, poisoning, and the malicious using of Means to procure the Miscarriage of Women, and also the malicious setting fire to Buildings; and also for repealing a certain Act made in England in the Twenty-first Year of the late King James the First, intituled An Act to prevent the destroying and murthering of Bastard Children,' and also an Act made in Ireland in the Sixth Year of the Reign of the late Queen Anne, also intituled An Act to prevent the destroying and murthering of Bastard Children, and for making other Provisions in lieu thereof.	The whole act.
54 G. 3. c. 101	Child Stealing Act 1814	An Act passed in the Fifty-fourth Year of the Reign of King George the Third, intituled An Act for the more effectual Prevention of Child-stealing	The whole act.
54 G. 3. c. 181	Assaults (Ireland) Act 1814	An Act passed in the same Year, intituled An Act to render more easy and Redress for Assaults in Ireland.	Save only so far as the said Act relates to Proceedings by Civil Bill. I.e., except sections 1 and 2.
58 G. 3. c. 38	Relief of Sailors Abroad Act 1818	An Act passed in the Fifty-eighth Year of the same Reign, intituled An Act to extend and render more effectual the present Regulations for the Relief of seafaring Men and Boys, Subjects of the United Kingdom of Great Britain and Ireland, in Foreign Parts.	As relates to the Trial of Offences against the Act of King William the Third, hereinbefore mentioned. I.e., section 1.
1 G. 4. c. 90	Offences at Sea Act 1820	An Act passed in the First Year of the Reign of His present Majesty, intituled An Act to remove Doubts and to remedy Defects in the Law, with respect to certain Offences committed upon the Sea or within the Jurisdiction of the Admiralty.	As refers to the Act of the Forty- third Year of the Reign of King George the Third, hereinbefore first mentioned. I.e., section 2.
1 & 2 G. 4. c. 88	Rescue Act 1821	An Act passed in the First and Second Years of the present Reign, intituled An Act for the Amendment of the Law of Rescue.	As relates to the Offences of assaulting, beating, and wounding therein mentioned. I.e., section 2.
3 G. 4. c. 38	Punishment for Manslaughter, etc. Act 1822	An Act passed in the Third Year of the present Reign, intituled An Act for the further and more adequate Punishment of Persons convicted of Manslaughter, and of Servants convicted of robbing their Masters, and of Accessories before the Fact to Grand Larceny and certain other Felonies.	The whole act. (Note: This Act was repealed in whole by the Statute Law Revision Act 1861. The Notes to the Statute Law Revision Act 1861 state: "Repealed As to England by 9 Geo. 4. c. 31. s. 1. As to India by 9 Geo. 4. c. 74. s. 125. As to Ireland by 10 Geo. 4. c. 34. s. 1. Semble, the Act entered in Col. 1. does not extend to Scotland. (Repealed in part, except as to Scotland or Ireland, by 7 Geo. 4. c. 64. s. 32. Repealed in part As to England by 7 & 8 Geo. 4. c. 27. As to Ireland by 9 Geo. 4. c. 53. s.1.)")
7 G. 4. c. 9	Hard Labour (Ireland) Act 1826	An Act passed in the Seventh Year of the present Reign, intituled An Act to provide for the more effectual Punishment of certain Offences in Ireland with hard Labour.	As relates to any Assault.

== See also ==
- Offences Against the Person Act
- Benefit of clergy
- Statute Law Revision Act
