= Margaret Willoughby =

English heiress (c.1401–1493)

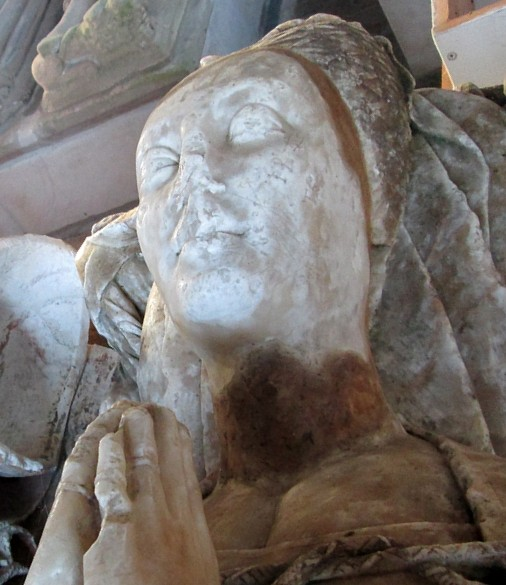
- from her tomb
- Born: Margaret Freville; 1401
- Died: 1493 (aged 91–92)
- Known for: landowner
- Spouse: Hugh Willoughby
- Children: eleven

Margaret Willoughby born Margaret Freville became Lady Willoughby and Margaret, Lady Bingham (1401 – 1493) was an English heiress and matriarch.

== Life ==
Margaret Freville was one of the women who were heiresses in the Freville family when she became the second wife of Hugh Willoughby by 1419. Hugh's first wife Isabel Foljambe had died in 1417 and two of their sons survived. As an heiress Margaret brought to her husband an income of about £200 a year from manors in Herefordshire, Nottinghamshire and Warwickshire.

She and Hugh were some of the richest members of the gentry in the English Midlands. In 1429 her husband's career at court gained him a knighthood at the coronation of Henry VI and she became Lady Willoughby. Her husband's riches increased, he now owned the important manor of Middleton in Warwickshire and a large quantity of silver which had been a prize of battle taken by Thomas Beaumont siegneur de Basqueville.

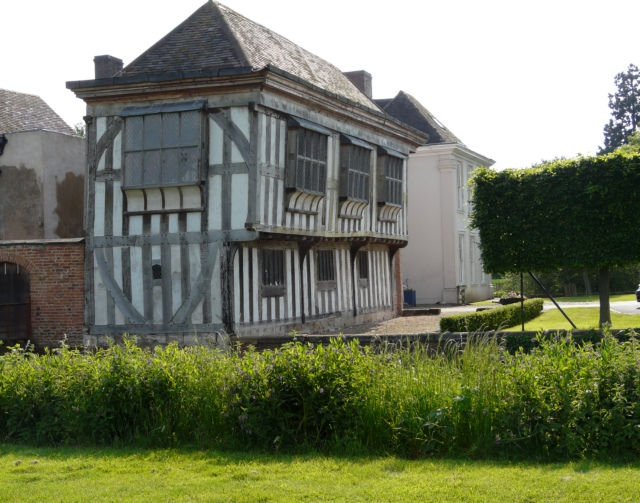
Middleton Hall still stands

In 1448 her husband died and his will was controversial. Hugh Willoughby made generous provisions for his eleven surviving children with Margaret however the bequests did not fulfil the expectations of the two children from Hugh's first marriage. Margaret was left with the whole of the Willoughby estate and the will provided marriage settlements of 200 marks for each of their children. The estate was to be left to Margaret and Hugh's children and controversially any rightful heirs that Margaret should have in the future.

Richard Willoughby, her stepson, was not happy. He received nothing from the will and when Margaret died then he would receive much less than he ever expected. After exactly a year of widowhood, Ralph, Lord Cromwell, and Sir John Fortescue, made a judgement concerning the will. They reduced the wealth that Margaret would receive. The manor at Woolaton was transferred to Richard Willoughby and manors that had been left to her and her heirs were transferred to Richard. Richard Willoughby died without any children in 1471.

== Death and legacy ==
Margaret lived for over 40 years after the death of Hugh Willoughby. Her long life prevented her heirs from their inheritance. Her family members were skilled in the law. She married Richard Bingham who as a Justice of the King's Bench. Richard lived and died in 1476 in Middleton. She died in 1492 and she left her partial control of the manor of Middleton to Sir Henry Willoughby, her grandson whose career flourished despite his part in the abduction of Jane Statham and forcible marriage to his brother Richard, which is considered to have triggered a change to the law in England to make abduction of a property-owning woman a felony.
