= List of acts of the Parliament of England from 1487 =

This is a list of acts of the Parliament of England for the year 1487.

For acts passed during the period 1707–1800, see the list of acts of the Parliament of Great Britain. See also the list of acts of the Parliament of Scotland, and the list of acts of the Parliament of Ireland.

For acts passed from 1801 onwards, see the list of acts of the Parliament of the United Kingdom. For acts of the devolved parliaments and assemblies in the United Kingdom, see the list of acts of the Scottish Parliament, the list of acts of the Northern Ireland Assembly, and the list of acts and measures of Senedd Cymru; see also the list of acts of the Parliament of Northern Ireland.

For medieval statutes, etc. that are not considered to be acts of Parliament, see the list of English statutes.

See also the List of ordinances and acts of the Parliament of England, 1642–1660 for ordinances and acts passed by the Long Parliament and other bodies without royal assent, and which were not considered to be valid legislation following the Restoration in 1660.

The number shown after each act's title is its chapter number. Acts are cited using this number, preceded by the years of the reign during which the relevant parliamentary session was held; thus the Union with Ireland Act 1800 is cited as "39 & 40 Geo. 3. c. 67", meaning the 67th act passed during the session that started in the 39th year of the reign of George III and which finished in the 40th year of that reign. The modern convention is to use Arabic numerals in citations (thus "41 Geo. 3" rather than "41 Geo. III"). Acts of the last session of the Parliament of Great Britain and the first session of the Parliament of the United Kingdom are both cited as "41 Geo. 3".

Acts passed by the Parliament of England did not have a short title; however, some of these acts have subsequently been given a short title by acts of the Parliament of the United Kingdom, such as the Short Titles Act 1896 (59 & 60 Vict. c. 14).

Acts passed by the Parliament of England were deemed to have come into effect on the first day of the session in which they were passed. Because of this, the years given in the list below may in fact be the year before a particular act was passed.

== 3 Hen. 7 ==
The 2nd Parliament of King Henry VII, which met from 9 November 1487.

This session was also traditionally cited as 3 H. 7.

Note that the Chronological Table of the Statutes does not list a c. 15 for this statute, but places c. 12 between c. 14 and c. 16.

| Short title | Citation | Royal assent |
Long title
| Star Chamber Act 1487 (repealed) | 3 Hen. 7. c. 1 | 9 November 1487 (Note: Start of session) |
An Acte geving the Court of Starchamber Authority to punnyshe dyvers Mydemeanors. (Repealed for England and Wales by Statute Law Revision Act 1863 (26 & 27 Vict. c. 125) and for Ireland by Statute Law (Ireland) Revision Act 1872 (35 & 36 Vict. c. 98))
| Recognizances Act 1487 (repealed) | 3 Hen. 7. c. 0 [c. 2] (Note: This is the citation in The Statutes of the Realm.); 3 Hen. 7. c. 1 (Note: This is the citation in The Statutes at Large.) | 9 November 1487 |
An Acte agaynst Murderers. (Repealed by Coroners Act 1887 (50 & 51 Vict. c. 71) and Statute Law Revision Act 1948 (11 & 12 Geo. 6. c. 62))
| Abduction of Women Act 1487 (repealed) | 3 Hen. 7. c. 2 | 9 November 1487 |
An Acte agaynst taking awaye of Women agaynst theire Wills. (Repealed for England and Wales by Offences Against the Person Act 1828 (9 Geo. 4. c. 31), for Ireland by Offences Against the Person (Ireland) Act 1829 (10 Geo. 4. c. 34) and for India by Criminal Law (India) Act 1828 (9 Geo. 4. c. 74))
| Taking of Bail by Justices Act 1487 (repealed) | 3 Hen. 7. c. 3 | 9 November 1487 |
An Act that Justices of Peace may take Bayle. (Repealed by Criminal Law Act 1826 (7 Geo. 4. c. 64), Criminal Statutes (Ireland) Repeal Act 1828 (9 Geo. 4. c. 53), Supreme Court of Judicature (Consolidation) Act 1925 (15 & 16 Geo. 5. c. 49) and Statute Law Revision Act 1948 (11 & 12 Geo. 6. c. 62))
| Fraudulent Deeds of Gift Act 1487 (repealed) | 3 Hen. 7. c. 4 | 9 November 1487 |
An Acte agaynst fraudulent deeds of gyft. (Repealed for England and Wales by Statute Law Revision Act 1863 (26 & 27 Vict. c. 125) and for Ireland by Statute Law (Ireland) Revision Act 1872 (35 & 36 Vict. c. 98))
| Usury Act 1487 (repealed) | 3 Hen. 7. c. 5 | 9 November 1487 |
An Acte agaynst Usury and unlawfull Bargaynes. (Repealed for England and Wales by Usury Act 1495 (11 Hen. 7. c. 8) and for Ireland by Statute Law Revision (Ireland) Act 1872 (35 & 36 Vict. c. 98))
| Usury (No. 2) Act 1487 (repealed) | 3 Hen. 7. c. 6 | 9 November 1487 |
An Acte agaynst Exchaunge and Rechaunge without the Kyngs Lycence. (Repealed for England and Wales by Statute Law Revision Act 1863 (26 & 27 Vict. c. 125) and for Ireland by Statute Law (Ireland) Revision Act 1872 (35 & 36 Vict. c. 98))
| Customs Act 1487 (repealed) | 3 Hen. 7. c. 7 | 9 November 1487 |
An Acte agaynst Marchants carrying of goods from one Port to an other without a certicat from the Customer where the goods were fyrst entred. (Repealed for England and Wales by Statute Law Revision Act 1863 (26 & 27 Vict. c. 125) and for Ireland by Statute Law (Ireland) Revision Act 1872 (35 & 36 Vict. c. 98))
| Alien Merchants Act 1487 (repealed) | 3 Hen. 7. c. 8 | 9 November 1487 |
An Act for confirmacion of a Statut made in the xvij^{th} yere of Edw. the 4^{th} agaynst carrying out of this Realme money for Wares brought into the same. (Repealed by Repeal of Acts Concerning Importation Act 1822 (3 Geo. 4. c. 41))
| Citizens of London Act 1487 (repealed) | 3 Hen. 7. c. 9 | 9 November 1487 |
An Acte that the Cytizens of London maye carry all manner of Wares to forrayne Marketts. (Repealed for England and Wales by Statute Law Revision Act 1863 (26 & 27 Vict. c. 125) and for Ireland by Statute Law (Ireland) Revision Act 1872 (35 & 36 Vict. c. 98))
| Costs in Error Act 1487 (repealed) | 3 Hen. 7. c. 10 | 9 November 1487 |
An Acte agaynst delaye of execucion uppon Writts of Error & to geve Costs. (Repealed by Civil Procedure Acts Repeal Act 1879 (42 & 43 Vict. c. 59))
| Exportation Act 1487 (repealed) | 3 Hen. 7. c. 11 | 9 November 1487 |
An Acte that noe Stranger or Denyson shall carry any Wollen Clothes out of this Realme before they be barbed rowed and shorne. (Repealed by Repeal of Acts Concerning Importation Act 1822 (3 Geo. 4. c. 41))
| King's Officers and Tenants Act 1487 (repealed) | 3 Hen. 7. c. 12 | 9 November 1487 |
An Acte agaynst retayning any of the Kyngs tennants. (Repealed for England and Wales by Continuance of Laws, etc. Act 1627 (3 Cha. 1. c. 5) and for Ireland by Statute Law Revision (Ireland) Act 1872 (35 & 36 Vict. c. 98))
| Price of Long Bows Act 1487 (repealed) | 3 Hen. 7. c. 13 | 9 November 1487 |
An Acte agaynst the excessyve price of Longe bowes. (Repealed for England and Wales by Statute Law Revision Act 1863 (26 & 27 Vict. c. 125) and for Ireland by Statute Law (Ireland) Revision Act 1872 (35 & 36 Vict. c. 98))
| King's Household Act 1487 (repealed) | 3 Hen. 7. c. 14 | 9 November 1487 |
An Acte that the Steward Treasuror and Controller of the Kyngs Howse shall enquire of offences done within the same. (Repealed for England and Wales by Offences Against the Person Act 1828 (9 Geo. 4. c. 31), for Ireland by Offences Against the Person (Ireland) Act 1829 (10 Geo. 4. c. 34) and for India by Criminal Law (India) Act 1828 (9 Geo. 4. c. 74))
| Feoffees in Trust Act 1487 (repealed) | 3 Hen. 7. c. 16 | 9 November 1487 |
An Act to enable Feoffes in trust to sue for the benefytt of the Feffors although they be outlawed. (Repealed for England and Wales by Statute Law Revision Act 1863 (26 & 27 Vict. c. 125) and for Ireland by Statute Law (Ireland) Revision Act 1872 (35 & 36 Vict. c. 98))

=== Sources ===
- "3° Hen. VII.". The Statutes of the Realm. Vol. 2: 1377 to 1509. pp. 509–523 – via HathiTrust.
- "Anno tertio Henrici VII". The Statutes at Large. Vol. 4 - 1 Richard III to 31 Henry VIII - 1483-4 to 1539. pp. 27–38 – via Internet Archive.
- "Anno tertio Henrici VII". The Statutes at Large. Vol. 4 - 1 Richard III to 31 Henry VIII - 1483-4 to 1539. pp. 27–38 – via Internet Archive.
- "Anno tertio Henrici VII". The Statutes at Large. Vol. 4 - 1 Richard III to 31 Henry VIII - 1483-4 to 1539. pp. 27–38 – via Internet Archive.
- Chronological Table of and Index to the Statutes. Vol. 1: To the End of the Session 59 Vict. Sess. 2 (1895) (13th ed.). London: Her Majesty's Stationery Office. 1896. pp. 40–41 – via Google Books.
- Chronological Table of the Statutes: Covering the Period from 1235 to the End of 1971. London: Her Majesty's Stationery Office. 1972. p. 35. ISBN 978-0-11-840096-1 – via Google Books.

== See also ==
- List of acts of the Parliament of England
