= Benefit of Clergy Act 1575 =

Act of the Parliament of England

- Act of Parliament
- Parliament of England
- Long title: An Act to take away clergy from the offenders in rape and burglary, and an order for the delivery of clerks convict without purgation.
- Citation: 18 Eliz. 1. c. 7
- Territorial extent: England and Wales

Dates
- Royal assent: 15 March 1576
- Commencement: 1 June 1576 (Note: Section 1.)
- Repealed: 1 July 1828 (England and Wales); 1 March 1829 (India)
Other legislation
Repealed by	Offences Against the Person Act 1828; Criminal Law (India) Act 1828

Status: Repealed

Text of statute as originally enacted

The Benefit of Clergy Act 1575 (18 Eliz. 1. c. 7), long title An Act to take away clergy from the offenders in rape and burglary, and an order for the delivery of clerks convict without purgation, was an act of the Parliament of England enacted during the reign of Elizabeth I.

It provided that if any person was found guilty of rape or burglary, they would suffer the death penalty as normal in felony cases, without being permitted the benefit of clergy.

== Subsequent developments ==
The whole act was repealed for England and Wales by section 1 of the Offences Against the Person Act 1828 (9 Geo. 4. c. 31) and for India by section 125 of the Criminal Law (India) Act 1828 (9 Geo. 4. c. 74).

== See also ==
- Benefit of clergy
