= Malicious Shooting or Stabbing Act 1803 =

Act of the Parliament of the United Kingdom

- Act of Parliament
- Parliament of the United Kingdom
- Long title: An Act for the further Prevention of malicious shooting, and attempting to discharge loaded Fire-Arms, stabbing, cutting, wounding, poisoning, and the malicious using of Means to procure the Miscarriage of Women; and also the malicious setting Fire to Buildings; and also for repealing a certain Act, made in England in the twenty-first Year of the late King James the First, intituled, An Act to prevent the destroying and murthering of Bastard Children; (Note: 21 Jas. 1. c. 27) and also an Act made in Ireland in the sixth Year of the Reign of the late Queen Anne, also intituled, An Act to prevent the destroying and murthering of Bastard Children; (Note: 6 Ann. c. 4 (Ir.)) and for making other Provisions in lieu thereof.
- Citation: 43 Geo. 3. c. 58
- Territorial extent: United Kingdom

Dates
- Royal assent: 24 June 1803
- Commencement: 1 July 1803 (Note: Section 1.)
- Repealed: England and Wales: 1 July 1828; India: 1 March 1829; Ireland: 2 September 1829
Other legislation
| Repeals/revokes | Concealment of Birth of Bastards Act 1623; Concealment of Birth of Bastards Act 1707 |
| Amended by | Criminal Statutes Repeal Act 1827; Criminal Statutes (Ireland) Repeal Act 1828 |
| Repealed by | England and Wales: Offences Against the Person Act 1828; India: Criminal Law (India) Act 1828; Ireland: Offences Against the Person (Ireland) Act 1829 |
| Relates to | Offences Against the Person Act 1861; Abortion Act 1967; Human Fertilisation and Embryology Act 1990 |

Status: Repealed

Text of statute as originally enacted

The Malicious Shooting or Stabbing Act 1803 (43 Geo. 3. c. 58), commonly called Lord Ellenborough's Act and sometimes referred to as the Malicious Shooting Act 1803 or the Malicious Shooting or Stabbing Act 1803, was an act of the Parliament of the United Kingdom.

The bill was proposed by the Lord Chief Justice of England and Wales, Edward Law, 1st Baron Ellenborough. Lord Ellenborough wished to clarify the law relating to abortion, which, at the time, was not clearly defined in the common law. The bill was introduced in the House of Lords in March 1803 as the Malicious Shootings Bill and also included provisions for clarifying certain other offences. After various amendments it was passed to the House of Commons on 18 May.

The act provided that it was an offence for any person to perform or cause an abortion. The punishment for performing or attempting to perform a post quickening abortion was the death penalty (section 1) and otherwise was transportation for fourteen years (section 2).

Similar provision was made for Scotland by the Malicious Wounding, etc. (Scotland) Act 1825 (6 Geo. 4. c. 126, An Act to make provision in Scotland for the further prevention of malicious shooting and attempting to discharge loaded firearms, stabbing, cutting, wounding, poisoning, maiming, disfiguring, and disabling His Majesty's subjects).

== Subsequent developments ==
The whole act was repealed for England and Wales by section 1 of the Offences Against the Person Act 1828 (9 Geo. 4. c. 31), which came into force on 1 July 1828.

The whole act was repealed for India by section 125 of the Criminal Law (India) Act 1828 (9 Geo. 4. c. 74), which came into force on 1 March 1829.

The whole act was repealed for Ireland by section 1 of the Offences Against the Person (Ireland) Act 1829 (10 Geo. 4. c. 34), which came into force on 1 September 1829.

== See also ==
- Offences against the Person Act 1861
- Abortion Act 1967
- Human Fertilisation and Embryology Act 1990
