= Bigamy Act 1603 =

Act of the Parliament of England

- Act of Parliament
- Parliament of England
- Long title: An Act to restrain all Persons from Marriage until their former Wives and former Husbands be dead.
- Citation: 1 Jas. 1. c. 11
- Territorial extent: England and Wales; India

Dates
- Royal assent: 7 July 1604
- Commencement: 7 July 1604 (Note: Section 1. End of session.)
- Repealed: England and Wales: 1 July 1828; India: 1 March 1829
Other legislation
Repealed by	England and Wales: Offences Against the Person Act 1828; India: Criminal Law (India) Act 1828
Relates to	Bigamy Act 1795

Status: Repealed

Text of statute as originally enacted

The Bigamy Act 1603 (1 Jas. 1. c. 11), sometimes called the Bigamy Act 1604, the Statute of Bigamy 1603 or the Statute of Bigamy 1604, was an act of the Parliament of England. It created the offence of bigamy as a capital felony. Bigamy had not previously been a temporal offence (that is to say, within the jurisdiction of the common law courts as opposed to the ecclesiastical courts).

Bigamy Act 1795
- Act of Parliament
- Parliament of Great Britain
- Long title: An act for rendering more effectual an act, passed in the first year of the reign of King James the First, intituled, "An act to restrain all persons from marriage until their former wives and former husbands be dead."
- Citation: 35 Geo. 3. c. 67
- Territorial extent: Great Britain

Dates
- Royal assent: 19 May 1795
- Commencement: 19 May 1795 (Note: The Acts of Parliament (Commencement) Act 1793.)
- Repealed: 1 July 1828
Other legislation
Repealed by	Offences Against the Person Act 1828
Relates to	Bigamy Act 1603

Status: Repealed

Text of statute as originally enacted

Further provision was made by the Bigamy Act 1795 (35 Geo. 3. c. 67).

== Section 1 ==
... if any persons or persons within his Majesty's Dominions of England and Wales, being married, or which hereafter shall marry, do at any time after the end of the session of this present Parliament, marry any person or persons, the former husband or wife being alive ... then every such offence shall be felony ... Provided always, that neither this Act, nor anything therein contained, shall extend to any person or persons whose husband or wife shall be continually remaining beyond the seas by the space of seven years together, or whose husband or wife shall absent him or herself the one from the other by the space of seven years together, in any parts within his Majesties Dominions, the one of them not knowing the other to be living within that time.

== Subsequent developments ==
The whole act was repealed for England and Wales by section 1 of the Offences against the Person Act 1828 (9 Geo. 4. c. 31), which came into force on 1 July 1828, and for India by section 125 of the Criminal Law (India) Act 1828 (c. 74), which came into force on 1 March 1829.
