= Henry Willoughby (courtier) =

15th-century English Knight

- Knight of the Body to Henry VII, Henry VIII; Sheriff of Nottinghamshire, Lincolnshire and Warwickshire, Master-General of the Ordnance
- Richard Bugge de Wiluby arms. Richard Bugge de Wiluby arms.
- Born: 1451; Wollaton, England
- Died: 11 May 1528 (aged 76–77); Middleton, Warwickshire, England
- Buried: St Leonard's Church
- Spouses: Margaret Markham (m. 1470); Lady Elizabeth Burgh (m. 1491); Ellen Egerton (m. 1512); Alice Walleys or Walters
- Father: Robert Willoughby (d. 1474)
- Mother: Margaret Griffith (d. 1491)

Sir Henry Willoughby (1451 – 11 May 1528) was a Knight of the Body to Kings Henry VII and Henry VIII and MGO.

== Origins ==
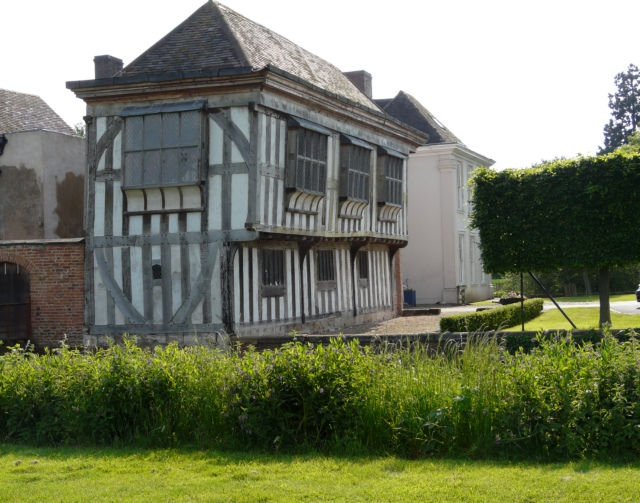
Willoughby residence at Middleton Estate

He was born in 1451 in Wollaton (Nottinghamshire), the eldest son of Robert Willoughby by his wife Margaret Griffith. His father's parents were Hugh Willoughby and his second wife Margaret Willoughby.

His mother married Peter Leigh of Nottingham after his father's death. Robert inherited the Wollaton and Middleton estates from his half brother Richard in 1471. It took a further two decades for him to take full possession, since his mother Margaret Leigh had an interest in Wollaton, while his grandmother Margaret Bingham spent her life in the Middleton estate, the Dunsby and Wigtoft estates in Lincolnshire, and the manors of Gunthorpe and Lowdham in Nottinghamshire.

At the origin of the Willoughby (Willuby) surname there is record of the Bugge family. They were either the original inhabitants of the town of Wollaton, or settled in it about the time of King John, rising to considerable eminence. From them sprung the Willoughbies of Wollaton.

Radulphus Bugge was an ancestor of diverse good families as observed in Willoughby-on-the-Wolds. He was a wealthy merchant and purchased the lands in 1240–41. Probably buried at St.Peter's church (Nottingham). He had two sons, Richard and Radulphus, the latter having been the father of Richard de Bingham. Richard's son, Richard de Willoughby was Knighted by King Edward II in 1325, and increased their patrimony exceedingly as a very rich lawyer.

Richard's son was Richard de Willoughby, a Justice of the Common Pleas for 28 years in the days of Edward III, who also appears to have had a few higher appointments in his career. From his second wife, Joana (Matilda) he had a son, Sir Edmund Willoughby, who inherited the bulk of the property. In the second subsequent generation Sir Hugh married Margaret Freville and started a Barony named after the estates.

Sir Henry was their grandson and a distinguished man in his day.

Willoughby family tree

Radulphus Bugge (c. 1197 – c. 1248)
Radulphus	Richardus Bugge de Willughby (born c. 1233)
Richard de Bingham	Sir Richardus de Willughby (died 1325)
Richardus de Willughby (born c. 1290)	Isabel de Mortein	Joana Charron (died 1342)
Sir Richardus de Willoughby	Hugo of Risley	Sir Edmund Willoughby
Edmund Willoughby (died c. 1414)	Isabell Annesley
Sir Hugh Willoughby (died c. 1448)	Isabel Foljambe	Margaret de Freville (died c. 1492)
Sir Richard Willoughby (died 1471)	Anna Leck	Robert Willoughby (died 1485)	Margaret Griffith
Sir Henry Willoughby (1451 – c. 1528)

== Career ==
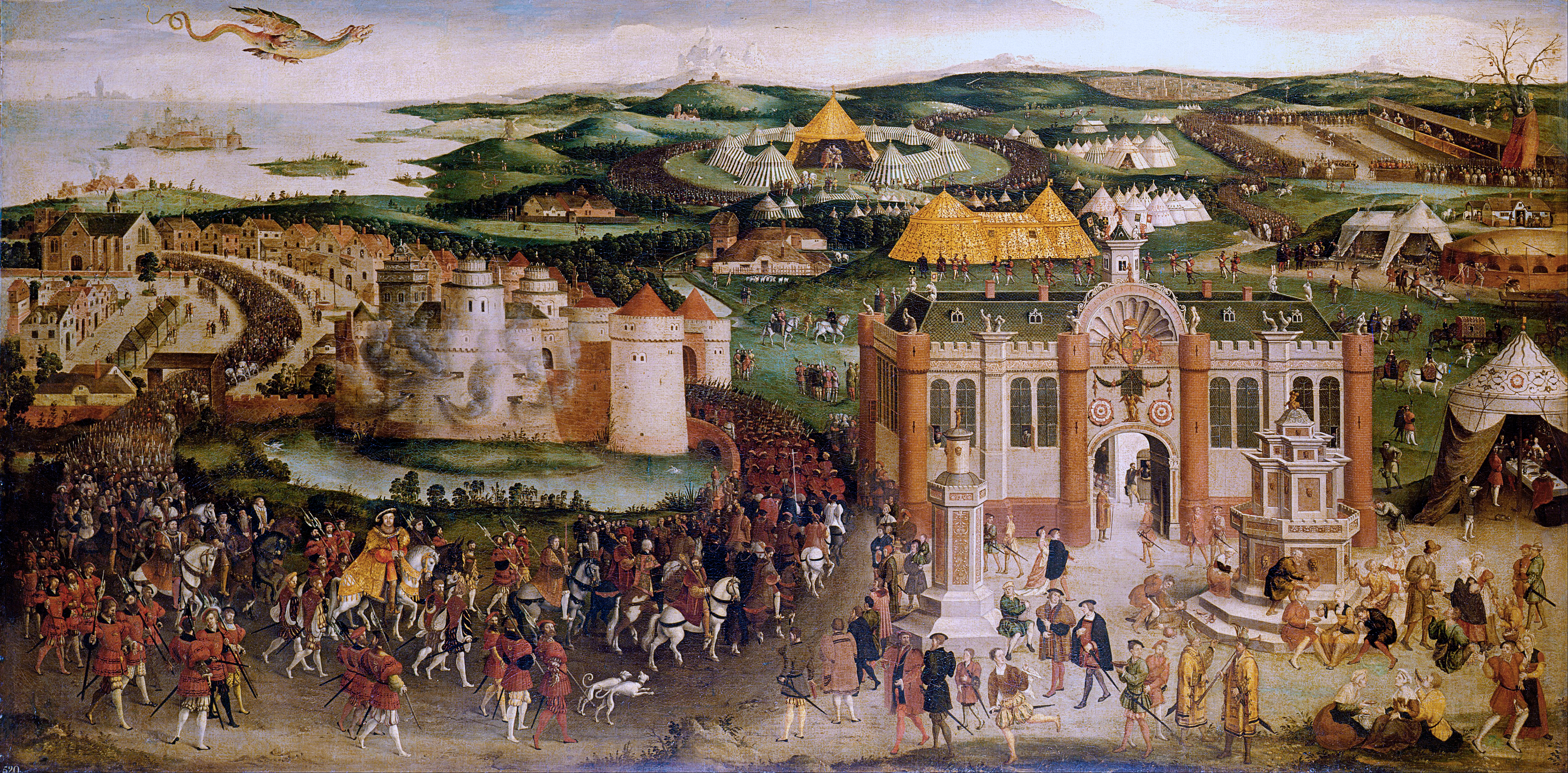
The Field of the Cloth of Gold, oil painting of c.1545. Henry VIII on horseback approaches at bottom left. Sir Henry could be the figure looking over the Queen, in front of what appears to be an Herald.

He was a servant of the royal household under Richard III, and a Knight of the Body to both Kings Henry VII and Henry VIII.

At the beginning of his reiving and cavalry days, Henry and his brother Richard were remained and tried for the abduction of Jane Statham. This happened after the latter become widowed at the outcome of the battle of Bosworth in 1485. The heiress of the House of York was also forcibly married to Richard and taken from her family. As a consequence, the Willoughbys had to pay large sums in compensation to the victim and affected family members, the marriage having also been annulled. The incident seems to have hardly affected their prosperity.

He was later knighted at the battle of Stoke by Henry VII in June 1487, and served in Flanders in 1489. Sir Henry maintained a retinue on behalf of the King, and campaigned in Brittany in 1491. He also defended Blackheath in 1497 during the Cornish rebellion. He was Master-General of the Ordnance to Henry VIII in 1512 and raised a retinue of more than 800 men to campaign in Spain, during the conquest of Iberian Navarre. He also fought at the Battle of the Spurs in 1513. He attended to Queen Catherine of Aragon at the Field of the Cloth of Gold summit in 1520.

He had much influence in the Midlands thanks to his great wealth, based mostly on coal from the Wollaton pits, which he exploited with fresh vigour. He became a justice of the peace in Nottinghamshire from 1492 for the remainder of his life. He held the same position in Lincolnshire and Warwickshire, and served as Sheriff for all three counties.

He was buried in St Leonard's Church, Wollaton where he rests today in his canopied tomb, with effigies to all his wives.

== Family ==
He married firstly Margaret c.1470, daughter of Sir Robert Markham (d. 1490). They had the following children:

- Sir John (died 1549), married Anne, daughter of Edward Grey, 1st Viscount Lisle in 1486
- Edward (d. 1541), married Anne, daughter of Sir William Filliol in 1518–19, and had:
  - Henry (d. 1549) married Anne Grey (d.1548), daughter of Thomas Grey, 2nd Marquess of Dorset, and had:
    - Thomas (d.1559)
    - Francis (1547–1596)
    - Margaret, who married Sir Matthew Arundell (c. 1533 – 1598) of Wardour Castle.
- Jane, who married the grandson of Ralph Percy, Sir Guiscard Harbottle of Beamish (d. Battle of Flodden). They had:
  - Eleanor (died 1567), married Sir Thomas Percy (c. 1504 – 1537)
  - Mary (c. 1507 – 1556)
  - George Harbottle Esq. (c. 1516 – c. 1538)
- Dorothy (died c. 1507), married Sir Anthony Fitzherbert of Norbury in 1507
- Margaret, married Sir John Zouche of Codnor in 1496, and had:
  - George Zouche, of Codnor (c.1498 – 1557)
  - Richard, William, Henry, Mary and Elizabeth Zouche

Secondly in 1491, he married Lady Elizabeth (died 1507), daughter of Thomas Burgh of Gainsborough, and widow of Richard Fitzhugh, Baron FitzHugh.

Henry married Ellen thirdly by 1512, daughter of John Egerton of Wrinehill, Staffordshire. They had:

- Sir Hugh (d. 1553) "the Navigator", married Jane Strelley
- Alice, married Richard Draycott (died 1544) in 1523, they had:
  - Henry, Edmund, George, Philip, Anne and Mary Draycott

Lastly, he married Alice Walleys or Walters.

== Ancestry ==
Ancestors of Henry Willoughby (courtier)

16. Sir Edmund Willoughby
8. Edmund Willoughby
17. Alice de Somerville
4. Sir Hugh Willoughby
18. Hugh II Annesley
9. Isabel Annesley
19. Benedicta Babington
2. Robert Willoughby
20. Baldwin Freville of Tamworth
10. Baldwin Freville
21. Joyce de Botetourt
5. Margaret de Freville
22. Sir Thomas de Greene
11. Joan de Greene
23. Margery Mablethorpe
1. Sir Henry Willoughby
24. Sir Rhys ap Gruffydd
12. Thomas Griffith Esq. of Wichnor
25. Margaret la Zouche
6. Sir John Griffith
26. Walter Blount
13. Anne Blount
27. Sancha de Ayála
3. Margaret Griffith
28. Sir William Tyrwhitt
14. Robert Tyrwhitt of Kettleby
29. Margaret Grovale
7. Catherine Tyrwhitt
30. William Kelke
15. Alice Kelke
31. Unknown Monson
