= List of acts of the Parliament of England from 1496 =

This is a list of acts of the Parliament of England for the year 1496.

For acts passed during the period 1707–1800, see the list of acts of the Parliament of Great Britain. See also the list of acts of the Parliament of Scotland, and the list of acts of the Parliament of Ireland.

For acts passed from 1801 onwards, see the list of acts of the Parliament of the United Kingdom. For acts of the devolved parliaments and assemblies in the United Kingdom, see the list of acts of the Scottish Parliament, the list of acts of the Northern Ireland Assembly, and the list of acts and measures of Senedd Cymru; see also the list of acts of the Parliament of Northern Ireland.

For medieval statutes, etc. that are not considered to be acts of Parliament, see the list of English statutes.

See also the List of ordinances and acts of the Parliament of England, 1642–1660 for ordinances and acts passed by the Long Parliament and other bodies without royal assent, and which were not considered to be valid legislation following the Restoration in 1660.

The number shown after each act's title is its chapter number. Acts are cited using this number, preceded by the years of the reign during which the relevant parliamentary session was held; thus the Union with Ireland Act 1800 is cited as "39 & 40 Geo. 3. c. 67", meaning the 67th act passed during the session that started in the 39th year of the reign of George III and which finished in the 40th year of that reign. The modern convention is to use Arabic numerals in citations (thus "41 Geo. 3" rather than "41 Geo. III"). Acts of the last session of the Parliament of Great Britain and the first session of the Parliament of the United Kingdom are both cited as "41 Geo. 3".

Acts passed by the Parliament of England did not have a short title; however, some of these acts have subsequently been given a short title by acts of the Parliament of the United Kingdom, such as the Short Titles Act 1896 (59 & 60 Vict. c. 14).

Acts passed by the Parliament of England were deemed to have come into effect on the first day of the session in which they were passed. Because of this, the years given in the list below may in fact be the year before a particular act was passed.

== 12 Hen. 7 ==
The 6th Parliament of King Henry VII, which met from 16 January 1497 until 13 March 1497.

This session was also traditionally cited as 12 H. 7.

Note that cc. 8–13 were traditionally cited as private acts cc. 1–4 and 7–8.

Short title	Citation	Royal assent
Long title
Worsted (Norfolk) Act 1496 (repealed)	12 Hen. 7. c. 1	13 March 1497
An Acte for taking of Prentises to make Worsteds in the County of Norff. (Repealed by Statute Law Revision Act 1863 (26 & 27 Vict. c. 125))
Continuance of Laws of 11 Hen. 7 Act 1496 (repealed)	12 Hen. 7. c. 2	13 March 1497
An Acte for confirmacion of dyvers Statutes formerly made agaynst ryotts perjurye and other offences. (Repealed by Statute Law Revision Act 1863 (26 & 27 Vict. c. 125))
Wages of Labourers, etc. Act 1496 (repealed)	12 Hen. 7. c. 3	13 March 1497
An Acte for the making voide of a Statut concerning Artificiers & poore Laborers. (Repealed by Statute Law Revision Act 1863 (26 & 27 Vict. c. 125))
Woollen Cloths Act 1496 (repealed)	12 Hen. 7. c. 4	13 March 1497
An Acte for the making of Wollen Clothes. (Repealed by Statute Law Revision Act 1863 (26 & 27 Vict. c. 125))
Weights and Measures Act 1496 (repealed)	12 Hen. 7. c. 5	13 March 1497
An Act for Wayghts and Measurers. (Repealed by Statute Law Revision Act 1863 (26 & 27 Vict. c. 125))
Merchant Adventurers Act 1496 (repealed)	12 Hen. 7. c. 6	13 March 1497
Merchauntis Adventurers. (Repealed by Repeal of Acts Concerning Importation Act 1822 (3 Geo. 4. c. 41))
Benefit of Clergy Act 1496 (repealed)	12 Hen. 7. c. 7	13 March 1497
An Act to make some Offences Petty Treason. (Repealed for England and Wales by Offences Against the Person Act 1828 (9 Geo. 4. c. 31) and for India by Criminal Law (India) Act 1828 (9 Geo. 4. c. 74))
Feoffments Made by the King Act 1496 (repealed)	12 Hen. 7. c. 8 (Note: This is the citation in The Statutes of the Realm.); 12 Hen. 7. c. 1 Pr. (Note: This is the citation in The Statutes at Large.)	13 March 1497
De feoffamento pro Regem fco. (Repealed by Statute Law (Repeals) Act 1978 (c. 45))
Queen's Dower Act 1496 (repealed)	12 Hen. 7. c. 9; 12 Hen. 7. c. 2 Pr.	13 March 1497
Pro Regina. (Repealed by Statute Law Revision Act 1953 (2 & 3 Eliz. 2. c. 5))
Annuity of Earl of Surrey Act 1496 (repealed)	12 Hen. 7. c. 10; 12 Hen. 7. c. 3 Pr.	13 March 1497
Pro Comite Surr. (Repealed by Statute Law Revision Act 1953 (2 & 3 Eliz. 2. c. 5))
Restitution of Guy Sapcott Act 1496 (repealed)	12 Hen. 7. c. 11; 12 Hen. 7. c. 4 Pr.	13 March 1497
Pro Guidone Sapcote. (Repealed by Statute Law Revision Act 1948 (11 & 12 Geo. 6. c. 62))
Taxation Act 1496 (repealed)	12 Hen. 7. c. 12; 12 Hen. 7. c. 7 Pr.	13 March 1497
An Acte for Fyftenthes and Tenthes. (Repealed by Statute Law Revision Act 1863 (26 & 27 Vict. c. 125))
Taxation (No. 2) Act 1496 (repealed)	12 Hen. 7. c. 13; 12 Hen. 7. c. 8 Pr.	13 March 1497
An Act for a Subsidie to be graunted to the Kinge, and for dischardg of some persons from payment thereof. (Repealed by Statute Law Revision Act 1863 (26 & 27 Vict. c. 125))

=== Sources ===
- "12° Hen. VII.". The Statutes of the Realm. Vol. 2: 1377 to 1509. pp. 636–647 – via HathiTrust.
- "Anno duodecimo Henrici VII". The Statutes at Large. Vol. 4 - 1 Richard III to 31 Henry VIII - 1483-4 to 1539. pp. 77–82 – via Internet Archive.
- "Anno duodecimo Henrici VII". The Statutes at Large. Vol. 4 - 1 Richard III to 31 Henry VIII - 1483-4 to 1539. pp. 77–82 – via Internet Archive.
- "Anno duodecimo Henrici VII". The Statutes at Large. Vol. 4 - 1 Richard III to 31 Henry VIII - 1483-4 to 1539. pp. 77–82 – via Internet Archive.
- Chronological Table of and Index to the Statutes. Vol. 1: To the End of the Session 59 Vict. Sess. 2 (1895) (13th ed.). London: Her Majesty's Stationery Office. 1896. p. 42 – via Google Books.
- Chronological Table of the Statutes: Covering the Period from 1235 to the End of 1971. London: Her Majesty's Stationery Office. 1972. p. 37. ISBN 978-0-11-840096-1 – via Google Books.

== See also ==
- List of acts of the Parliament of England
