= Benefit of Clergy Act 1496 =

Act of the Parliament of England

- Act of Parliament
- Parliament of England
- Long title: An Act to make some Offences Petty Treason.
- Citation: 12 Hen. 7. c.7
- Territorial extent: England and Wales

Dates
- Royal assent: 13 March 1497
- Commencement: 16 January 1497 (Note: Start of session.)
- Repealed: England and Wales: 1 July 1882; India: 1 March 1829
Other legislation
Repealed by	England and Wales: Offences Against the Person Act 1828; India: Criminal Law (India) Act 1828
Relates to	Benefit of Clergy Act 1531

Status: Repealed

Text of statute as originally enacted

The Benefit of Clergy Act 1496 (12 Hen. 7. c. 7), was an act of the Parliament of England, passed during the reign of Henry VII of England, that abolished benefit of clergy for petty treason. Its long title was "An Act to make some Offences Petty Treason."

== Subsequent developments ==
The whole act was repealed for England and Wales by section 1 of the Offences Against the Person Act 1828 (9 Geo. 4. c. 31), which came into force on 1 July 1828.

== See also ==
- High treason in the United Kingdom
- Benefit of clergy
