= Jane Statham =

15th-16th c. English gentry

Jane Statham (c. 1450/1455 – after 1537) was an English heiress and petitioner for law reform.

Born in the early 1450s, Jane was heiress to the manor of Morley in Derbyshire. Soon after the death of her first husband John Sacheverell at the Battle of Bosworth Field in 1485, Jane was abducted by Henry Willoughby of Wollaton and forcibly married to his brother Richard. Jane was restored to her family, and her forced marriage annulled, after she petitioned Parliament for assistance. Her experience almost certainly triggered a change to the law in England to make abduction of a property-owning woman a felony. Later in life, Jane became the last Prioress of Markyate Priory before it was dissolved in 1536.

== Life ==
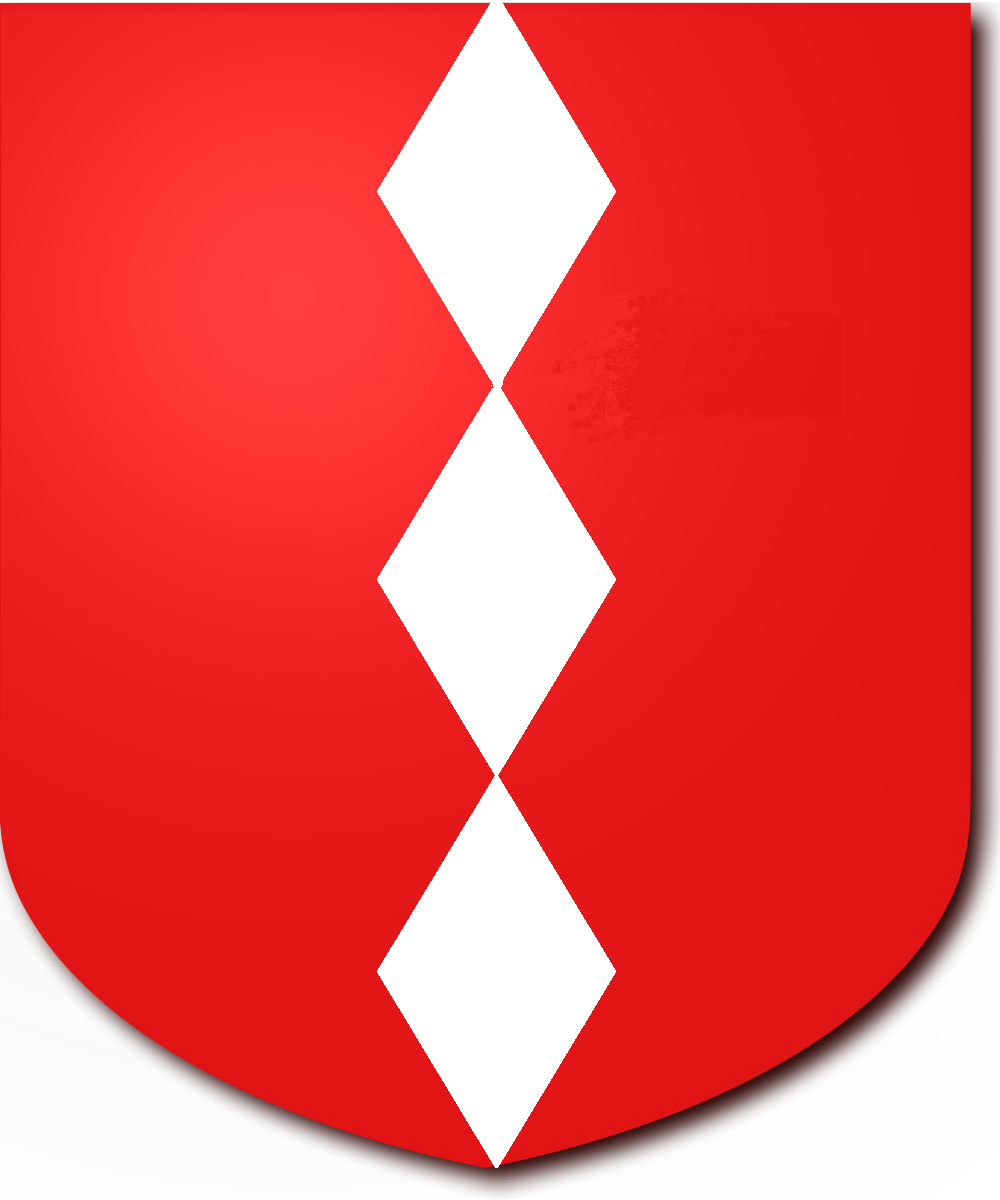
Arms of the family of Statham or Stathum, later of Morley, in Derbyshire

Jane Statham (also recorded as Joan Stathum) was heir to her father Henry Statham, lord of the manor of Morley in Derbyshire, who died on 30 April 1480. Her mother was Henry's first wife Anne Bothe or Booth, daughter of Thomas Booth, Lord of Barton. She was a niece of the lawyer and member of parliament Nicholas Statham.

Jane was married firstly to John Sacheverell, a younger son of the family of Sacheverell of Hopwell. Their eldest son and heir, Henry, was born by 1475, and they had two other sons (Ralph and John) and five daughters. John was killed on 22 August 1485 at the Battle of Bosworth, fighting alongside Richard III in the last charge on Henry Tudor. A brass showing John, Jane and their children, and recording that John died fighting for Richard III, was installed about forty years after his death in Morley Church, and is one of very few memorials referring to the losing side at Bosworth.

As a widow with an underage son in line to inherit estates from both sides of the family, Jane was betrothed very soon after her husband's death at Bosworth to William Zouche of Castle Eton and Hampton Meysey, a near neighbour and suitable stepfather for her son. Before the marriage could take place, on 11 November 1485, Jane was ambushed on a journey between Hopwell (home of her Sacheverell in-laws) and Morley by a party of 100 armed men led by Henry Willoughby of Wollaton. She was tied to one of the men on horseback and taken on a long journey, via Nottinghamshire and Leicestershire, then finally to the Willoughby property of Middleton in Warwickshire. Her petition to Parliament records that she was menaced by Richard Willoughby, younger brother of her abductor, who '[did] his pleasure with her as his own will without that she well consent and be agreeable' [spelling modernised]. She was forced into marriage with Richard at some point in her imprisonment.

The King intervened by appointing an arbitrator between the families (see below) and the marriage was able to be annulled. Jane and William Zouche were married by 18 May 1487.

Following William Zouche's death, Jane entered religious life. She was prioress of Markyate Priory in Bedfordshire by 1508, and appears to have run the priory well, with no infractions reported during visitations. She was still the prioress at the time the priory was dissolved in 1536, and was still alive on 10 February 1537, when she received her first instalment of her pension of 20 marks.

The manor of Morley passed to her Sacheverell heirs, and eventually to the Sitwell family.

== Parliamentary petition and legal reform ==
A petition in Jane's name was sent to Henry VII's first Parliament in December 1485. The petition probably did not come directly from Jane herself as she was still in her captors' hands. It sought an order that Jane be returned to Morley within six days of the order being made, that the Willoughbys be remanded without bail and tried for the alleged felonies of ravishment and robbery at the next session of the King's Bench, that they receive a felon's sentence if found guilty, and that Jane's right to sue for trespass, false imprisonment, robbery and rape also be preserved. As well as the remedies for Jane, the petition asks for the King as advised by Parliament to "[avoid and eschew] hereafter ... all such ravishment, robbery and riotous dealing of widows and other women" [spelling modernised].

On 2 February 1485/6, Henry and Richard Willoughby were required to keep the peace and put themselves under an independent arbiter. The result of the arbitration, given on 16 April 1486, was that Jane's "abominable pretended unlawful matrimony" to Richard Willoughby was to be dissolved on the basis of her precontract with William Zouche, and Richard and his mother Dame Margaret Leigh were to bear the costs. The Willoughbys were also required to pay 100 marks (£66 13s 4d) to William Zouche, Ralph Sacheverell (her father-in-law) and Jane. In return, Jane was to give up her right to sue once the compensation was paid. Henry and Richard Willoughby faced no other sanction for the abduction, and Henry continued to prosper under Henry VII, being knighted in 1487 at the Battle of Stoke.

At the time of Jane's abduction, the law treated the abduction of a woman as an infringement of her family's property rights—a trespass—rather than an act of assault against the woman. This meant it was a civil matter and not a cause for Crown involvement under the peace was threatened. In canon law, consent given under duress was enough to invalidate a marriage, but this could not always be enforced in practice, given the prevalence of arranged marriages and the pressure on women to acquiesce once some time had passed. In Jane's case, the difficulty of the legal process was one of the reasons why a remedy was sought from Parliament, rather than the much slower course of seeking justice in the law courts.

Abduction of Women Act 1487
- Act of Parliament
- Parliament of England
- Long title: An Acte agaynst taking awaye of Women agaynst theire Wills.
- Citation: 3 Hen. 7. c. 2
- Territorial extent: England and Wales

Dates
- Royal assent: 9 November 1487 (Note: Start of session.)
- Commencement: 9 November 1487
- Repealed: 2 September 1829
Other legislation
Amended by	Offences Against the Person Act 1828
Repealed by	Offences Against the Person (Ireland) Act 1829

Status: Repealed

Text of statute as originally enacted

It is likely that Jane's case, and the plea in her petition for her abductors to be treated as felons, led directly to a change in the law in 1487. A new statute, the Abduction of Women Act 1487 (3 Hen. 7. c. 2), entitled 'An Acte agaynst taking awaye of Women agaynst theire Wills' made abduction and forced marriage (or rape) of property-owning women or heiresses for the purposes of financial gain a felony in England. Those who aided and abetted the abduction or imprisonment were also guilty of a felony in England.
