= Francis Reilly (barrister) =

English barrister (1825–1883)

Sir Francis Reilly KCMG, QC

Counsel to the Speaker of the House of Commons
- In office 1882 – 27 August 1883

Parliamentary draftsman
- In office 1851–1882

Personal details
- Born: Francis Savage Reilly; 4 February 1825 Scarva, County Down, Ireland
- Died: 27 August 1883 (aged 58) Bournemouth, England
- Parents: James Miles Reilly (father); Emily Georgina Susanna Montgomery (mother)
- Relatives: Major General William Edward Moyses Reilly, CB, Légion d'honneur (brother)
- Education: Trinity College, Dublin; Lincoln's Inn
- Occupation: Parliamentary draftsman
- Profession: Barrister

Sir Francis Savage Reilly (February 1825–27 August 1883) QC KCMG was an Anglo-Irish lawyer.

As a parliamentary draftsman, Reilly drafted the British North America Act 1867 (30 & 31 Vict. c. 3), the foundational document of the Constitution of Canada, now known in Canada as the Constitution Act, 1867.

== Early life ==
Francis Savage Reilly was born in February 1825 to James Miles Reilly and Emilia Georgina Susanna Montgomery, in Dublin,[Ireland.

Reilly was educated at Trinity College Dublin.

== Career ==
Reilly was admitted to the bar of Lincoln's Inn on 17 November 1847. He was called to the bar of Lincolns Inn on 7 May 1851. As a barrister, Reilly specialised in insurance disputes and commercial arbitration. In 1873, Reilly published a compilation of Lord Westbury's decisions on European arbitration.

On 17 February 1860, the Attorney General, Sir Richard Bethell told the House of Commons that he had engaged Sir Francis Reilly and A. J. Wood to expurgate the statute book of all acts which, though not expressly repealed, were not in force, working backwards from the present time. This led to the passing of the Statute Law Revision Act 1861 (24 & 25 Vict. c. 101), which repealed or amended over 800 enactments, the Statute Law Revision Act 1863. (26 & 27 Vict. c. 125), which repealed or amended over 1,600 enactments for England and Wales and the Statute Law Revision Act 1867 (30 & 31 Vict. c. 59) was passed, which repealed or amended over 1,380 enactments.

On 29 March 1882, Reilly was appointed Queen's Counsel.

On 6 May 1882, Reilly was made a Knight Commander of the Order of St. Michael and St. George (KCMG) for services to the Foreign and Colonial departments.

== Personal life ==
=== Death ===
Reilly died on 27 August 1883 at age 58, unmarried.

== Legacy ==
Reilly's drafting of section 121 of the British North America Act 1867 (30 & 31 Vict. c. 3) was analysed in the R v Comeau, a leading and controversial case of the Supreme Court of Canada concerning the scope of free trade between the provinces of Canada.
