= Benefit of clergy =

Former right to be tried under canon law

In English law, the benefit of clergy (Law Latin: privilegium clericale) was originally a provision by which clergymen accused of a crime could claim that they were outside the jurisdiction of the secular courts and be tried instead in an ecclesiastical court under canon law. The ecclesiastical courts were generally seen as being more lenient in their prosecutions and punishments, and defendants made many efforts to claim clergy status, often on questionable or fraudulent grounds.

Various reforms limited the scope of this legal arrangement to prevent its abuse, including branding of a thumb upon first use, to limit the number of invocations for some. Eventually, the benefit of clergy evolved into a legal fiction in which first-time offenders could receive lesser sentences for some crimes (the so-called "clergyable" ones). The legal mechanism was abolished in the United Kingdom in 1827 with the passage of the Criminal Law Act 1827.

== Origin ==
When the Roman Empire converted to Christianity, its emperors issued legal privileges to clerics, particularly bishops, granting them immunity from civic prosecution. In the early Middle Ages, canon law tended to extend the degree of this privilege, even including criminal matters. In England, this tradition was only partially accepted. Before the 12th century, traditional English law courts had been jointly presided over by a bishop and a local secular magistrate.

In 1164, however, Henry II promulgated the Constitutions of Clarendon, which established a new system of courts that rendered decisions wholly by royal authority. The Assizes touched off a power struggle between the king and Thomas Becket, Archbishop of Canterbury. Becket asserted that these secular courts had no jurisdiction over clergy members because it was the privilege of clergy not to be accused or tried for crime except before an ecclesiastical court. After four of Henry's knights murdered Becket in 1170, public sentiment turned against the king, forcing him to make amends with the church. As part of the Compromise of Avranches, Henry was purged of any guilt in Becket's murder. Still, he agreed that the secular courts, with few exceptions (high treason being one of them, and forest law another), had no jurisdiction over the clergy.

== The Miserere ==
At first, to plead the benefit of clergy, one had to appear before the court tonsured and otherwise wear an ecclesiastical dress. Over time, this proof of clergyhood was replaced by a literacy test: defendants demonstrated their clerical status by reading from the Latin Bible. This opened the door to literate lay defendants also claiming the benefit of clergy. In 1351, under Edward III, this loophole was formalised in statute, and the benefit of clergy was officially extended to all who could read. For example, the English dramatist Ben Jonson avoided hanging by pleading benefit of clergy in 1598 when charged with manslaughter. In the British colony of Massachusetts, the two soldiers convicted of manslaughter in the 1770 Boston Massacre were spared execution under the benefit of clergy. Still, they underwent branding of their right thumbs to prevent them from invoking the right in any future murder case (see Tudor reforms below).

Unofficially, the loophole was even larger because the Biblical passage traditionally used for the literacy test was, appropriately, the third verse of Psalm 51 (Psalm 50 according to the Vulgate and Septuagint numbering), Miserere mei, Deus, secundum magnam misericordiam tuam ("O God, have mercy upon me, according to thine heartfelt mercifulness"). Thus, an illiterate person who had memorized the appropriate Psalm could also claim the benefit of clergy. Psalm 51:3 became known as the "neck verse" because knowing it could "save one's neck" (an idiom for "save one's life") by transferring the case from a secular court, where hanging was a likely sentence, to an ecclesiastical court, where both the methods of trial and the sentences given were more lenient.

The benefit of clergy was commonly applied as a means of judicial mercy: in Elizabethan England, courts might allow more than 90% of clergyable offenders the benefit of clergy, which was far higher than the literacy rate of the period. If a defendant who claimed the benefit of clergy were thought to be particularly deserving of death, courts occasionally would ask him to read a different passage from the Bible; if, like most defendants, he was illiterate and simply had memorized Psalm 51, he would be unable to do so and would be put to death.

In the ecclesiastical courts, the most common form of trial was by compurgation. If the defendant swore an oath to his innocence and found twelve compurgators to swear likewise to their belief that the accused was innocent, he was acquitted. A person convicted by an ecclesiastical court could be defrocked and returned to the secular authorities for punishment. Still, the English ecclesiastical courts became increasingly lenient, and by the 15th century, most convictions in these courts led to a sentence of penance.

== Tudor-era reforms ==
As a result of this leniency in the ecclesiastical courts, many reforms were undertaken to combat the abuse of the benefit of clergy. In 1488, Henry VII decreed that non-clergymen should be allowed to plead the benefit of clergy only once: those claiming the benefit of clergy but not able to prove through documentation of their holy orders that they were clergy members, were branded on the thumb, and the brand disqualified them from pleading the benefit of clergy in the future. (In 1547, the privilege of claiming the benefit of clergy more than once was extended to peers of the realm, even illiterate ones.)

In 1512, Henry VIII further restricted the benefit of clergy by making certain offences "unclergyable" offences; in the words of the statutes, they were "felonies without benefit of clergy". This restriction was condemned by Pope Leo X at the Fifth Lateran Council in 1514. The resulting controversy (in which both the Lord Chief Justice and the Archbishop of Canterbury became involved) was one of the issues that would lead to Henry VIII splitting the Church of England from the Catholic Church in 1532.

The 1512 statute limited the availability of benefit of clergy for murders and felonies committed "of and upon malice prepensed". A 1530 statute allowed the benefit of clergy a second time only if the second conviction was for "manslaughter by chance medley, and not murder of malice prepensed" but barred it for "petit treason, murder or felony". By the end of the 16th century, the list of unclergyable offences included murder, rape, poisoning, petty treason, sacrilege, witchcraft, burglary, theft from churches, and pickpocketing. In 1533 benefit of clergy was withdrawn from those who refused to enter a plea.

In 1575, a statute of Elizabeth I radically changed the effect of the benefit of clergy. Whereas before the benefit was pleaded before a trial to have the case transferred to an ecclesiastical court, under the new system, the benefit of clergy was pleaded after conviction but before sentencing. It did not nullify the conviction but instead changed the sentence for first-time offenders from probable hanging to branding and up to a year's incarceration.

== Later development ==
Benefit of Clergy Act 1670
- Act of Parliament
- Parliament of England
- Long title: An Act for takeing away the Benefit of Clergy from such as steale Cloth from the Racke and from such as shall steale or imbezill his Majestyes Ammunition and Stores.
- Citation: 22 Cha. 2. c. 5
- Territorial extent: England and Wales

Dates
- Royal assent: 11 April 1670
- Commencement: 25 May 1670 (Note: Section 1.)
- Repealed: England and Wales: 1 July 1827; India: 1 March 1829
Other legislation
Repealed by	England and Wales: Criminal Statutes Repeal Act 1827; India: Criminal Law (India) Act 1828
Relates to	Embezzlement Act 1588

Status: Repealed

Text of statute as originally enacted

By this point, the benefit of clergy had been transformed from a privilege of ecclesiastical jurisdiction to a mechanism by which first-time offenders could obtain partial clemency for some crimes. Legislation in the 17th and 18th centuries increased the number of defendants who could plead the benefit of clergy but decreased the benefit of doing so.

Women acquired the benefit of clergy in 1624, although it was not until 1691 that they were given equal privileges with men. (For example, before 1691, women could plead the benefit of clergy if convicted of theft of goods valued less than 10 shillings, while men could plead clergy for thefts up to 40 shillings.) In the opinion of many contemporary legal scholars, a Jew who had not renounced Judaism could not claim the benefit of clergy.

In 1706, the reading test was abolished, and the benefit became available to all first-time offenders of lesser felonies. Meanwhile, an increasing crime rate prompted Parliament to exclude many seemingly minor property crimes from the benefit of clergy. Eventually, housebreaking, shoplifting goods worth more than 5 shillings, and the theft of sheep and cattle all became felonies without the benefit of clergy. They earned their perpetrator's automatic death sentences under the so-called "Bloody Code". Judges retained the discretion to ask the accused to read a text other than Psalm 51, where they suspected the privilege was being abused.

When the literacy test was abolished in 1706, the lesser sentence given to those who pleaded benefit of clergy was increased to up to 6–24 months' hard labour. Under the Transportation Act 1718, those who pleaded benefit of clergy could be sentenced to seven years' banishment to North America. The American Revolution (1775–1783) disrupted the application of this punishment (although two of the British soldiers convicted for their roles in the 1770 Boston Massacre made use of the benefit of clergy to receive reduced punishments). With the abolition of branding in 1779, the benefit of clergy was no longer an option in most cases. Although transportation shifted to Australia, this came to be done using straightforward sentences of transportation for a term of years or for life.

The benefit of clergy was abolished in the United Kingdom of Great Britain and Ireland by two acts in 1823, and Parliament formally abolished the benefit of clergy with the Criminal Law Act 1827. However, a statute of Edward VI also enabled peers to claim a similar benefit, and it was uncertain that this form of proceeding was covered by the words of the Criminal Law Act 1827. The abolition of the benefit for peers was abolished by the Felony Act 1841 (4 & 5 Vict. c. 22).

In the United States, section 31 of the Crimes Act of 1790 eliminated the benefit from federal courts in capital cases, but it survived well into the mid-19th century in some state courts (for example, South Carolina granted a defendant benefit of clergy in 1855, and the state's Confederate Constitution forbade the benefit in cases of treason). Many states and counties have abolished the clergy benefits by proclamation, statute, or judicial decision; in others, it simply has fallen into disuse without formal abolition.

== See also ==
- Authentica habita
- Benefit of Clergy Act 1402 (abolished compurgation for high treason and theft)
- Benefit of Clergy Act 1496 (abolished benefit of clergy for petty treason and murder)
- Benefit of Clergy Act 1575 (abolished benefit of clergy for those found guilty of rape and burglary)
