= List of acts of the Parliament of the United Kingdom from 1809 =

This is a complete list of acts of the Parliament of the United Kingdom for the year 1809.

Note that the first parliament of the United Kingdom was held in 1801; parliaments between 1707 and 1800 were either parliaments of Great Britain or of Ireland. For acts passed up until 1707, see the list of acts of the Parliament of England and the list of acts of the Parliament of Scotland. For acts passed from 1707 to 1800, see the list of acts of the Parliament of Great Britain. See also the list of acts of the Parliament of Ireland.

For acts of the devolved parliaments and assemblies in the United Kingdom, see the list of acts of the Scottish Parliament, the list of acts of the Northern Ireland Assembly, and the list of acts and measures of Senedd Cymru; see also the list of acts of the Parliament of Northern Ireland.

The number shown after each act's title is its chapter number. Acts passed before 1963 are cited using this number, preceded by the year(s) of the reign during which the relevant parliamentary session was held; thus the Union with Ireland Act 1800 is cited as "39 & 40 Geo. 3 c. 67", meaning the 67th act passed during the session that started in the 39th year of the reign of George III and which finished in the 40th year of that reign. Note that the modern convention is to use Arabic numerals in citations (thus "41 Geo. 3" rather than "41 Geo. III"). Acts of the last session of the Parliament of Great Britain and the first session of the Parliament of the United Kingdom are both cited as "41 Geo. 3". Acts passed from 1963 onwards are simply cited by calendar year and chapter number.

All modern acts have a short title, e.g. "the Local Government Act 2003". Some earlier acts also have a short title given to them by later acts, such as by the Short Titles Act 1896.

== 49 Geo. 3 ==
The third session of the 4th Parliament of the United Kingdom, which met from 19 January 1809 until 21 June 1809.

This session was also traditionally cited as 49 G. 3.

=== Public general acts ===
Short title	Citation	Royal assent
Long title
Duties on Malt, etc. Act 1809 (repealed)	49 Geo. 3. c. 1	22 February 1809
An Act for continuing to His Majesty certain Duties on Malt, Sugar, Tobacco, and Snuff, in Great Britain; and on Pensions, Offices, and Personal Estates in England; for the Service of the Year One thousand eight hundred and nine. (Repealed by Statute Law Revision Act 1872 (No. 2) (35 & 36 Vict. c. 97))
Exchequer Bills Act 1809 (repealed)	49 Geo. 3. c. 2	22 February 1809
An Act for raising the Sum of Ten millions five hundred thousand Pounds, by Exchequer Bills, for the Service of Great Britain for the Year One thousand eight hundred and nine. (Repealed by Statute Law Revision Act 1872 (No. 2) (35 & 36 Vict. c. 97))
Exchequer Bills (No. 2) Act 1809 (repealed)	49 Geo. 3. c. 3	22 February 1809
An Act for raising the Sum of One million five hundred thousand Pounds, by Exchequer Bills, for the Service of Great Britain for the Year One thousand eight hundred and nine. (Repealed by Statute Law Revision Act 1872 (No. 2) (35 & 36 Vict. c. 97))
Militia (Great Britain) Act 1809 (repealed)	49 Geo. 3. c. 4	13 March 1809
An Act to allow a certain Proportion of the Militia of Great Britain to enlist voluntarily into the Regular Forces. (Repealed by Statute Law Revision Act 1861 (24 & 25 Vict. c. 101))
Militia (Ireland) (No. 1) Act 1809 (repealed)	49 Geo. 3. c. 5	13 March 1809
An Act to allow a certain Proportion of the Militia in Ireland voluntarily to enlist into His Majesty's Regular Forces. (Repealed by Statute Law Revision Act 1861 (24 & 25 Vict. c. 101))
Relief of Prisoners for Debt Act 1809 (repealed)	49 Geo. 3. c. 6	13 March 1809
An Act for the Relief of Prisoners in Custody for Non-payment of Money pursuant to Orders of Courts of Equity. (Repealed by Statute Law Revision Act 1872 (No. 2) (35 & 36 Vict. c. 97))
Distillation of Spirits Act 1809 (repealed)	49 Geo. 3. c. 7	13 March 1809
An Act to prohibit the Distillation of Spirits from Corn or Grain, in the United Kingdom for a limited Time. (Repealed by Statute Law Revision Act 1872 (No. 2) (35 & 36 Vict. c. 97))
Importation Act 1809 (repealed)	49 Geo. 3. c. 8	13 March 1809
An Act to suspend the Importation of British or Irish made Spirits into Great Britain or Ireland respectively, until the First Day of June One thousand eight hundred and nine. (Repealed by Statute Law Revision Act 1872 (No. 2) (35 & 36 Vict. c. 97))
Importation (No. 2) Act 1809 (repealed)	49 Geo. 3. c. 9	13 March 1809
An Act to grant Bounties on the Importation of Flax Seed into Ireland from Great Britain, until the Eighth Day of April One thousand eight hundred and nine; and to amend the Laws for the Regulation of the Linen Manufacture in Ireland, so far as relates to Importers of Flax Seed. (Repealed by Statute Law Revision Act 1861 (24 & 25 Vict. c. 101))
Bounties, etc., on Sugar Act 1809 (repealed)	49 Geo. 3. c. 10	20 March 1809
An Act to continue so much of an Act of the Forty-seventh Year of His present Majesty, as allows a Bounty upon double refined Sugar exported, until the Twenty-fifth Day of March One thousand eight hundred and eleven; and so much of the same Act as allows a Bounty on Raw Sugar exported, until the Twenty-fifth Day of March One thousand eight hundred and ten. (Repealed by Statute Law Revision Act 1872 (No. 2) (35 & 36 Vict. c. 97))
Bounties, etc., on Sugar (No. 2) Act 1809 (repealed)	49 Geo. 3. c. 11	20 March 1809
An Act for further continuing, until the Twenty-fifth Day of March One thousand eight hundred and ten, certain Bounties and Drawbacks on the Exportation of Sugar from Great Britain, and for suspending the Countervailing Duties and Bounties on Sugar when the Duties imposed by an Act of the Forty-fifth Year of His present Majesty shall be suspended. (Repealed by Statute Law Revision Act 1872 (No. 2) (35 & 36 Vict. c. 97))
Mutiny Act 1809 (repealed)	49 Geo. 3. c. 12	20 March 1809
An Act for punishing Mutiny and Desertion; and for the better Payment of the Army and their Quarters. (Repealed by Statute Law Revision Act 1872 (No. 2) (35 & 36 Vict. c. 97))
Forgery of Bank of Ireland Notes, etc. Act 1809 (repealed)	49 Geo. 3. c. 13	20 March 1809
An Act for the more effectually preventing the Forging of Bank Notes, Bank Bills of Exchange, and Bank Post Bills, and the Negociation of forged and counterfeited Bank Notes, Bank Bills of Exchange, and Bank Post Bills, of the Governor and Company of the Bank of Ireland. (Repealed by Criminal Statutes Repeal Act 1861 (24 & 25 Vict. c. 95))
Concealment of Birth (Scotland) Act 1809 (repealed)	49 Geo. 3. c. 14	20 March 1809
An Act for repealing an Act of the Parliament of Scotland (Note: Child Murder Act 1690 (April c. 50 (S))) relative to Child Murder, and for making other Provisions in lieu thereof. (Repealed by Statute Law Revision Act 1872 (No. 2) (35 & 36 Vict. c. 97))
Indemnity Act 1809 (repealed)	49 Geo. 3. c. 15	20 March 1809
An Act to indemnify such Persons in the United Kingdom as have omitted to qualify themselves for Offices and Employments, and for extending the Times limited for those Purposes respectively, until the Twenty-fifth Day of March One thousand eight hundred and ten; and to permit such Persons in Great Britain as have omitted to make and file Affidavits of the Execution of Indentures of Clerks to Attornies and Solicitors, to make and file the same on or before the First Day of Hilary Term One thousand eight hundred and ten. (Repealed by Promissory Oaths Act 1871 (34 & 35 Vict. c. 48))
Importation (No. 3) Act 1809 (repealed)	49 Geo. 3. c. 16	24 March 1809
An Act to allow the Importation of Rum and other Spirits from the Island of Bermuda into the Province of Lower Canada, without Payment of Duty, on the same Terms and Conditions as such Importation may be made directly from His Majesty's Sugar Colonies in the West Indies. (Repealed by British North America (Trade and Lands) Act 1822 (3 Geo. 4. c. 119))
Cape of Good Hope Trade Act 1809 (repealed)	49 Geo. 3. c. 17	24 March 1809
An Act to authorize His Majesty, during the present War, to make Regulations respecting the Trade and Commerce to and from the Cape of Good Hope. (Repealed by Customs Law Repeal Act 1825 (6 Geo. 4. c. 105))
Importation, etc. Act 1809 (repealed)	49 Geo. 3. c. 18	24 March 1809
An Act tor continuing until the Twenty-fifth Day of March One thousand eight hundred and fourteen, several Acts for the free Importation of Cochineal and Indigo; and until the Twenty-fifth Day of March One thousand eight hundred and nineteen, an Act of the Forty sixth Year of His present Majesty, to permit the Exportation of Wool from the British Plantations in America. (Repealed by Statute Law Revision Act 1872 (No. 2) (35 & 36 Vict. c. 97))
Marine Mutiny Act 1809 (repealed)	49 Geo. 3. c. 19	24 March 1809
An Act for the Regulation of His Majesty's Royal Marine Forces while on Shore. (Repealed by Statute Law Revision Act 1872 (No. 2) (35 & 36 Vict. c. 97))
Silk Manufactures Act 1809 (repealed)	49 Geo. 3. c. 20	24 March 1809
An Act to make perpetual several Laws relating to the Encouragement of the Silk Manufactures; to the allowing the Importation of Rape Seed, and other Seeds used for extracting Oil, whenever the Prices of middling British Rape Seed shall be above a certain Limit; to the encouraging the Growth of Coffee in His Majesty's Plantations in America; and for amending and making perpetual several Laws relating to the preventing the clandestine running of Goods, and the Danger of Infection thereby; and to the allowing the Importation of Seal Skins cured with Foreign Salt free of Duty. (Repealed by Statute Law Revision Act 1872 (No. 2) (35 & 36 Vict. c. 97))
National Debt Act 1809 (repealed)	49 Geo. 3. c. 21	24 March 1809
An Act for granting Annuities to discharge certain Exchequer Bills. (Repealed by Statute Law Revision Act 1870 (33 & 34 Vict. c. 69))
Importation, etc. (No. 2) Act 1809 (repealed)	49 Geo. 3. c. 22	24 March 1809
An Act for allowing the Importation and Exportation of certain Goods and Commodities into and from the Port of Falmouth in the Island of Jamaica. (Repealed by Trade Act 1822 (3 Geo. 4. c. 44))
Exportation Act 1809 (repealed)	49 Geo. 3. c. 23	30 March 1809
An Act for further continuing until the Twenty-fifth Day of March One thousand eight hundred and ten, an Act made in the Thirty-ninth Year of His present Majesty, for prohibiting the Exportation from and permitting the Importation to Great Britain of Corn; and for allowing the Importation of other Articles of Provision without Payment of Duty. (Repealed by Statute Law Revision Act 1872 (No. 2) (35 & 36 Vict. c. 97))
Distillation of Spirits (No. 2) Act 1809 (repealed)	49 Geo. 3. c. 24	30 March 1809
An Act for charging with Duty Spent Wash, re-distilled in Great Britain. (Repealed by Statute Law Revision Act 1872 (No. 2) (35 & 36 Vict. c. 97))
Importation (No. 4) Act 1809 (repealed)	49 Geo. 3. c. 25	30 March 1809
An Act to permit, until the Twenty-fifth Day of March One thousand eight hundred and eleven, the Importation of Tobacco into Great Britain from any Place whatever. (Repealed by Statute Law Revision Act 1872 (No. 2) (35 & 36 Vict. c. 97))
Importation (No. 5) Act 1809 (repealed)	49 Geo. 3. c. 26	30 March 1809
An Act for allowing until the Twenty-fifth Day of March One thousand eight hundred and ten, the Importation of certain Fish from Parts of the Coast of His Majesty's North American Colonies; and for granting a Bounty thereon. (Repealed by Statute Law Revision Act 1872 (No. 2) (35 & 36 Vict. c. 97))
Newfoundland Act 1809 (repealed)	49 Geo. 3. c. 27	30 March 1809
An Act for establishing Courts of Judicature in the Island of Newfoundland and the Islands adjacent; and for re-annexing Part of the Coast of Labrador and the Islands lying on the said Coast to the Government of Newfoundland. (Repealed by Newfoundland Act 1824 (5 Geo. 4. c. 67), British North America (Seigniorial Rights) Act 1825 (6 Geo. 4. c. 59) and Statute Law Revision Act 1872 (No. 2) (35 & 36 Vict. c. 97))
Attorneys Act 1809 (repealed)	49 Geo. 3. c. 28	30 March 1809
An Act to enable the Clerks of the King's Coroner and Attorney in the Court of King's Bench to be admitted as Attornies. (Repealed by Statute Law Revision Act 1872 (No. 2) (35 & 36 Vict. c. 97))
Flax Seed (Ireland) Act 1809 (repealed)	49 Geo. 3. c. 29	28 April 1809
An Act for the Appropriation of Twenty thousand Pounds out of the Consolidated Fund of Ireland, towards the Encouragement of the saving of Flax Seed for sowing in Ireland. (Repealed by Statute Law Revision Act 1872 (No. 2) (35 & 36 Vict. c. 97))
Exportation (No. 2) Act 1809 (repealed)	49 Geo. 3. c. 30	28 April 1809
An Act to continue, until the Twenty-fifth Day of March One thousand eight hundred and ten, certain Acts for regulating the Drawbacks and Bounties on the Exportation of Sugar from Ireland, and for warehousing in Ireland, Rum or Spirits of the British Sugar Plantations (Repealed by Statute Law Revision Act 1872 (No. 2) (35 & 36 Vict. c. 97))
Exportation (No. 3) Act 1809 (repealed)	49 Geo. 3. c. 31	28 April 1809
An Act to continue until the Twenty-fifth Day of March One thousand eight hundred and ten, an Act of the Forty-first Year of His present Majesty, for prohibiting the Exportation from Ireland, and for permitting the Importation into Ireland, Duty free, of Corn and other Provisions. (Repealed by Statute Law Revision Act 1872 (No. 2) (35 & 36 Vict. c. 97))
Pension Duties Act 1809 or the Pensions Duties Act 1809 (repealed)	49 Geo. 3. c. 32	28 April 1809
An Act for continuing and making perpetual several Duties of One Shilling and Sixpence, repealed by an Act of the last Session of Parliament, (Note: Duties on Malt, etc. Act 1808 (48 Geo. 3. c. 2)) on Offices and Employments of Profit, and on Annuities, Pensions, and Stipends, and thereby granted for One Year to the Twenty-fifth Day of March One thousand eight hundred and nine. (Repealed by Statute Law Revision Act 1958 (6 & 7 Eliz. 2. c. 46) (Note: Incorrectly cited as "SLR 1858" in the Chronological Table of the Statutes.))
Excise (Ireland) Act 1809 (repealed)	49 Geo. 3. c. 33	28 April 1809
An Act to grant an Excise Duty on Spirits made or distilled from Sugar in Ireland, during the Prohibition of Distillation from Corn or Grain there, in lieu of the Excise Duty now chargeable thereon, and to allow a Drawback on the Export thereof to Foreign Parts. (Repealed by Statute Law Revision Act 1861 (24 & 25 Vict. c. 101))
Prize Act 1809 (repealed)	49 Geo. 3. c. 34	28 April 1809
An Act to permit the Registry at Malta of Ships taken as Prize. (Repealed by Statute Law Revision Act 1861 (24 & 25 Vict. c. 101))
Pensions for Naval Officers' Widows Act 1809 (repealed)	49 Geo. 3. c. 35	28 April 1809
An Act for the more convenient Payment of Pensions to Widows of Officers of the Navy. (Repealed by Naval Officers' Widows' Charity Act 1829 (10 Geo. 4. c. 14))
Hospitals (Ireland) Act 1809 (repealed)	49 Geo. 3. c. 36	28 April 1809
An Act to amend an Act made in the Forty-fifth Year of His present Majesty, (Note: County Infirmaries (Ireland) Act 1805 (45 Geo. 3. c. 111)) for amending and rendering more effectual an Act of the Parliament of Ireland, (Note: County Hospitals Act 1765 (5 Geo. 3. c. 20 (I))) for erecting and establishing Publick Infirmaries or Hospitals. (Repealed by Statute Law Revision Act 1872 (No. 2) (35 & 36 Vict. c. 97))
Quartering of Soldiers Act 1809 (repealed)	49 Geo. 3. c. 37	28 April 1809
An Act for increasing the Rates of Subsistence to be paid to Innkeepers and others on quartering Soldiers. (Repealed by Statute Law Revision Act 1872 (No. 2) (35 & 36 Vict. c. 97))
Payment of Creditors (Scotland) Act 1809 (repealed)	49 Geo. 3. c. 38	28 April 1809
An Act for further continuing until the Twenty-fifth Day of July One thousand eight hundred and eleven, an Act made in the Thirty-third Year of His present Majesty, (Note: Payment of Creditors (Scotland) Act 1793 (33 Geo. 3. c. 74)) for rendering the Payment of Creditors more equal and expeditious in Scotland. (Repealed by Statute Law Revision Act 1872 (No. 2) (35 & 36 Vict. c. 97))
Fortifications, Portsmouth and Dover Act 1809	49 Geo. 3. c. 39	28 April 1809
An Act for making Compensation to the Proprietors of such Lands and Hereditaments as have been purchased for better securing His Majesty's Docks, Ships, and Stores, at Portsmouth, and for extending the Lines and Works at Dover; in pursuance of an Act made in the Forty-sixth Year of His present Majesty.
Local Militia (England) Act 1809 (repealed)	49 Geo. 3. c. 40	12 May 1809
An Act to amend and render more effectual an Act, passed in the last Session of Parliament, (Note: Local Militia (England) Act 1808 (48 Geo. 3. c. 111)) for enabling His Majesty to establish a permanent Local Militia Force, under certain Restrictions for the Defence of the Realm. (Repealed by Local Militia (England) Act 1812 (52 Geo. 3. c. 38))
Re-captured British-built Ships Act 1809 (repealed)	49 Geo. 3. c. 41	12 May 1809
An Act to amend an Act made in the Forty-eighth Year of His present Majesty, (Note: British Ships Captured by the Enemy Act 1808 (48 Geo. 3. c. 70)) to provide that British Ships captured by the Enemy, becoming the Property of British Subjects, shall not be entitled to the Privilege of British Ships. (Repealed by Registering of Vessels Act 1823 (4 Geo. 4. c. 41))
Public Records (Scotland) Act 1809	49 Geo. 3. c. 42	12 May 1809
An Act for better regulating the Publick Records of Scotland.
Average Price of Brown Sugar Act 1809 (repealed)	49 Geo. 3. c. 43	12 May 1809
An Act for regulating the Mode in which the Average Price of Brown or Muscovado Sugar, exclusive of the Duty thereon, is to be ascertained under the Provisions of an Act passed in the Forty-sixth Year of His present Majesty. (Note: Duties on Certain Goods Act 1806 (46 Geo. 3. c. 42)) (Repealed by Statute Law Revision Act 1872 (No. 2) (35 & 36 Vict. c. 97))
Exemption from Duties Act 1809 (repealed)	49 Geo. 3. c. 44	12 May 1809
An Act to permit Goods brought in as Prize, and restored by the Court of Admiralty, or which have been seized as Droits, and so restored, to be sold or transferred within this Kingdom, without paying the Home Consumption Duty. (Repealed by Statute Law Revision Act 1861 (24 & 25 Vict. c. 101))
Compassionate List of the Navy, etc. Act 1809 (repealed)	49 Geo. 3. c. 45	12 May 1809
An Act for more conveniently paying of Allowances on the Compassionate List of the Navy, and of Half Pay to Officers of the Royal Marines. (Repealed by Pay of the Navy Act 1830 (11 Geo. 4 & 1 Will. 4. c. 20))
Customs Act 1809 (repealed)	49 Geo. 3. c. 46	12 May 1809
An Act to authorize the principal Officers of the Customs in the British Colonies and Plantations in America and the West Indies, to examine Witnesses on Oath. (Repealed by Statute Law Revision Act 1872 (No. 2) (35 & 36 Vict. c. 97))
Trade Between Europe and British America Act 1809 (repealed)	49 Geo. 3. c. 47	12 May 1809
An Act to permit certain Articles, the Growth, Production, or Manufacture of Europe, to be laden and shipped on board Ships arriving with British North American Produce, and Fish taken by Settlers in the British North American Colonies, at any Port of Europe, in order to be exported to the principal Ports in the British Colonies and Plantations in North America. (Repealed by Trade, Europe and American Colonies Act 1811 (51 Geo. 3. c. 97))
Local Militia (Scotland) Act 1809 (repealed)	49 Geo. 3. c. 48	20 May 1809
An Act to amend and render more effectual an Act passed in the last Session of Parliament, (Note: Local Militia (Scotland) Act 1808 (48 Geo. 3. c. 150)) for enabling His Majesty to establish a Permanent Local Militia Force in Scotland, under certain Restrictions for the Defence of the Realm. (Repealed by Local Militia (Scotland) Act 1812 (52 Geo. 3. c. 68))
Trade of Nova Scotia, etc. Act 1809 (repealed)	49 Geo. 3. c. 49	20 May 1809
An Act to authorize His Majesty to permit, until the Twenty-fifth Day of March One thousand eight hundred and twelve, any Goods and Commodities to be imported into and exported from Nova Scotia and New Brunswick, in any Ship or Vessel whatsoever. (Repealed by Statute Law Revision Act 1872 (No. 2) (35 & 36 Vict. c. 97))
Discount on Newspapers Act 1809 (repealed)	49 Geo. 3. c. 50	20 May 1809
An Act to amend so much of an Act made in the Thirty-seventh Year of His present Majesty, (Note: Stamps (No. 2) Act 1797 (37 Geo. 3. c. 90)) for granting to His Majesty certain Stamp Duties, as relates to the Limitation according to which the Discount on Newspapers is regulated. (Repealed by Statute Law Revision Act 1872 (No. 2) (35 & 36 Vict. c. 97))
Fees in Public Offices, etc. (Ireland) Act 1809 (repealed)	49 Geo. 3. c. 51	20 May 1809
An Act to continue until the First Day of August One thousand eight hundred and ten, and amend certain Acts for appointing Commissioners to enquire into the Fees, Gratuities, Perquisites, and Emoluments received in several Public Offices in Ireland; to examine into any Abuses which may exist in the same, and into the Mode of receiving, collecting, issuing, and accounting for public Money in Ireland. (Repealed by Statute Law Revision Act 1872 (No. 2) (35 & 36 Vict. c. 97))
Exchequer Bills (No. 3) Act 1809 (repealed)	49 Geo. 3. c. 52	20 May 1809
An Act for raising the Sum of Six Millions, by Exchequer Bills, for the Service of Great Britain, for the Year One thousand eight, hundred and nine. (Repealed by Statute Law Revision Act 1872 (No. 2) (35 & 36 Vict. c. 97))
Militia (Great Britain) (No. 2) Act 1809 (repealed)	49 Geo. 3. c. 53	27 May 1809
An Act for completing the Militia of Great Britain. (Repealed by Statute Law Revision Act 1872 (No. 2) (35 & 36 Vict. c. 97))
Insolvent Debtors Relief (Ireland) Act 1809 (repealed)	49 Geo. 3. c. 54	27 May 1809
An Act for the Relief of certain Insolvent Debtors in Ireland. (Repealed by Statute Law Revision Act 1872 (No. 2) (35 & 36 Vict. c. 97))
Land Tax Act 1809 (repealed)	49 Geo. 3. c. 55	27 May 1809
An Act for rectifying Mistakes in the Names of the Commissioners appointed by an Act of the last Session of Parliament for appointing Commissioners for carrying into Execution an Act of this Session of Parliament (Note: Land Tax Act 1808 (48 Geo. 3. c. 102)) for granting to His Majesty a Duty on Pensions and Offices in England, and an Act, made in the Thirty-eighth Year of His present Majesty, (Note: Land Tax Act 1797 (38 Geo. 3. c. 5)) for granting an Aid to His Majesty by a Land Tax to be raised in Great Britain for the Service of the Year One thousand seven hundred and ninety-eight, and for appointing other Commissioners together with those named in the first mentioned Act, to put in Execution an Act of this Session of Parliament (Note: Duties on Malt, etc. Act 1809 (49 Geo. 3. c. 1)) for continuing to His Majesty certain Duties on Malt, Sugar, Tobacco, and Snuff, in Great Britain, and on Pensions, Offices, and Personal Estates in England, for the Service of the Year One thousand eight hundred and nine, also the said Act made in the Thirty-eighth Year of His present Majesty; and for indemnifying such Persons as have acted as Commissioners for executing the said Acts. (Repealed by Statute Law Revision Act 1872 (No. 2) (35 & 36 Vict. c. 97))
Militia (Ireland) (No. 2) Act 1809 (repealed)	49 Geo. 3. c. 56	3 June 1809
An Act for completing the Militia of Ireland. (Repealed by Statute Law Revision Act 1861 (24 & 25 Vict. c. 101))
Beer and Malt (Ireland) Act 1809 (repealed)	49 Geo. 3. c. 57	3 June 1809
An Act for improving the Quality of Beer in Ireland, by further preventing the Use of unmalted Corn, or of any deleterious or unwholesome Ingredients therein, and for the better securing the Collection of the Malt Duties in Ireland. (Repealed by Statute Law Revision Act 1872 (No. 2) (35 & 36 Vict. c. 97))
Friendly Societies (Ireland) Act 1809 (repealed)	49 Geo. 3. c. 58	3 June 1809
An Act to explain and render more effectual an Act, passed in the Parliament of Ireland in the Thirty-sixth Year of His present Majesty's Reign, (Note: Friendly Societies Act 1796 (36 Geo. 3. c. 58 (I))) for the Encouragement and Relief of Friendly Societies. (Repealed by Friendly Societies Act 1855 (18 & 19 Vict. c. 63))
Trade with United States Act 1809 (repealed)	49 Geo. 3. c. 59	3 June 1809
An Act to permit the Trade between Great Britain and the United States of America to be carried on in Ships or Vessels belonging to the Inhabitants of the said States. (Repealed by Customs Law Repeal Act 1825 (6 Geo. 4. c. 105))
Importation (No. 6) Act 1809 (repealed)	49 Geo. 3. c. 60	3 June 1809
An Act for allowing the Importation from any Port in Europe or Africa, of Goods or Commodities the Growth or Produce of any Country, until Six Months after the Ratification of a Definitive Treaty of Peace. (Repealed by Statute Law Revision Act 1872 (No. 2) (35 & 36 Vict. c. 97))
Duty on Sugar, etc. Act 1809 (repealed)	49 Geo. 3. c. 61	3 June 1809
An Act for making Sugar and Coffee of Martinique and Marie-galante liable to Duty on Importation as Sugar and Coffee not of the British Plantations. (Repealed by Customs Law Repeal Act 1825 (6 Geo. 4. c. 105))
Smuggling Customs Regulations, etc. Act 1809 or the Smuggling Act 1809 (repealed)	49 Geo. 3. c. 62	3 June 1809
An Act to amend several Acts for the Prevention of Smuggling; for better securing the Duties on Coals, Culm, and Cinders; and for permitting the Exportation of Salt, Pepper, and Wine, from Guernsey or Jersey to Sark, in small Packages. (Repealed by Customs Law Repeal Act 1825 (6 Geo. 4. c. 105))
Excise Act 1809 (repealed)	49 Geo. 3. c. 63	3 June 1809
An Act for repealing the Duties on the Materials used in making Spread Window Glass and Crown Glass, and for granting other Duties in lieu thereof, and for the better Collection of the said Duties. (Repealed by Glass Duties Act 1838 (1 & 2 Vict. c. 44))
Reduction of National Debt Act 1809 (repealed)	49 Geo. 3. c. 64	3 June 1809
An Act to amend an Act passed in the last Session of Parliament, (Note: Life Annuities Act 1808 (48 Geo. 3. c. 142)) for enabling the Commissioners for the Reduction of the National Debt to grant Life Annuities. (Repealed by Statute Law Revision Act 1872 (No. 2) (35 & 36 Vict. c. 97))
Customs (No. 2) Act 1809 (repealed)	49 Geo. 3. c. 65	3 June 1809
An Act for giving Jurisdiction to Justices of the Peace to hear and determine Prosecutions for Penalties incurred by any Offence against the Laws relating to the Revenue of Customs; and also requiring all Goods, customable and not exciseable, seized by any Police or Peace Officer to be brought to the Custom-House Warehouse in London, within a certain Period. (Repealed by Customs Law Repeal Act 1825 (6 Geo. 4. c. 105))
Officers of Excise Act 1809 (repealed)	49 Geo. 3. c. 66	3 June 1809
An Act for the Abolition of certain Holidays, and for altering and extending the Time for keeping open the Chief Office of Excise. (Repealed by Statute Law Revision Act 1861 (24 & 25 Vict. c. 101))
Land Tax (No. 2) Act 1809 (repealed)	49 Geo. 3. c. 67	3 June 1809
An Act to amend an Act, passed in the Forty-sixth Year of His present Majesty, (Note: Excise (No. 4) Act 1806 (46 Geo. 3. c. 138)) for the Redemption and Sale of the Land Tax, and to make further Provision for exonerating Small Livings and Charitable Institutions from the Land Tax. (Repealed by Statute Law Revision Act 1872 (No. 2) (35 & 36 Vict. c. 97))
Bastardy Act 1809 (repealed)	49 Geo. 3. c. 68	3 June 1809
An Act to explain and amend the Law of Bastardy, so far as relates to indemnifying Parishes in respect thereof. (Repealed by Statute Law Revision Act 1872 (No. 2) (35 & 36 Vict. c. 97))
Indemnity as to Certain Books Act 1809 (repealed)	49 Geo. 3. c. 69	3 June 1809
An Act to indemnify Persons who have inadvertently printed, published, or dispersed Papers or Books without a full Description of the Place of Abode of the Printers thereof, from Penalties incurred under an Act of the Thirty-ninth Year of His Majesty's Reign. (Note: Unlawful Societies Act 1799 (39 Geo. 3. c. 79)) (Repealed by Statute Law Revision Act 1861 (24 & 25 Vict. c. 101))
Dublin General Post Office Act 1809 (repealed)	49 Geo. 3. c. 70	3 June 1809
An Act to amend an Act passed in the Forty-eighth Year of His present Majesty, (Note: Dublin General Post Office Act 1808 (48 Geo. 3. c. 48)) to enable His Majesty's Postmaster General of Ireland to purchase Premises for the Enlargement of the General Post Office in the City of Dublin. (Repealed by Statute Law (Repeals) Act 2013 (c. 2))
National Debt (No. 2) Act 1809 (repealed)	49 Geo. 3. c. 71	3 June 1809
An Act for raising the Sum of Fourteen Millions Six hundred thousand Pounds by way of Annuities. (Repealed by Statute Law Revision Act 1870 (33 & 34 Vict. c. 69))
Wide Streets and Coal Trade, Dublin Act 1809 (repealed)	49 Geo. 3. c. 72	3 June 1809
An Act to continue until the Twenty-fifth Day of March One thousand eight hundred and eleven, certain Acts of the Parliament of Ireland, for the Improvement of the City of Dublin, by making wide and convenient Passages through the same, and for regulating the Coal Trade thereof, and for other Purposes. (Repealed by Statute Law Revision Act 1872 (No. 2) (35 & 36 Vict. c. 97))
Duties on Spirits (Ireland) Act 1809 (repealed)	49 Geo. 3. c. 73	10 June 1809
An Act to grant to His Majesty Duties upon Spirits made or distilled in Ireland, and upon British Spirits imported into Ireland, and upon Licences to sell Spirituous Liquors in Ireland in Quantities not less than Two Gallons. (Repealed by Statute Law Revision Act 1872 (No. 2) (35 & 36 Vict. c. 97))
Duties, Drawbacks, etc. (Ireland) Act 1809 (repealed)	49 Geo. 3. c. 74	10 June 1809
An Act to continue until the Fifth Day of July One thousand eight hundred and ten, several Acts for granting certain Rates and Duties, and for allowing certain Drawbacks and Bounties on Goods, Wares, and Merchandize, imported into and exported from Ireland. (Repealed by Statute Law Revision Act 1872 (No. 2) (35 & 36 Vict. c. 97))
Taxes on Carriages, etc. (Ireland) Act 1809 (repealed)	49 Geo. 3. c. 75	10 June 1809
An Act to provide for the better Collection of the Duties and Taxes on Carriages, Servants, Horses, and Dogs, in Ireland. (Repealed by Assessed Taxes, etc. (Ireland) Act 1816 (56 Geo. 3. c. 57))
Exportation (Ireland) Act 1809 (repealed)	49 Geo. 3. c. 76	10 June 1809
An Act for vesting in the Lord Lieutenant of Ireland, by Advice of the Privy Council the Power of prohibiting the Exportation and carrying Coastwise of Gunpowder, Saltpetre, Arms, Ammunition, and Naval Stores. (Repealed by Statute Law Revision Act 1861 (24 & 25 Vict. c. 101))
Excise (No. 2) Act 1809 (repealed)	49 Geo. 3. c. 77	10 June 1809
An Act to amend the several Acts for securing the Duties on Paper made in Ireland. (Repealed by Duties on Paper (Ireland) Act 1815 (55 Geo. 3. c. 112))
National Debt (No. 3) Act 1809 (repealed)	49 Geo. 3. c. 78	10 June 1809
An Act for raising the Sum of One Million two hundred and fifty thousand Pounds, by way of Annuities and Treasury Bills for the Service of Ireland. (Repealed by Statute Law Revision Act 1870 (33 & 34 Vict. c. 69))
Treasury Bills (Ireland) Act 1809 (repealed)	49 Geo. 3. c. 79	10 June 1809
An Act for raising the Sum of Five hundred thousand Pounds by Treasury Bills for the Service of Ireland for the Year One thousand eight hundred and nine. (Repealed by Statute Law Revision Act 1872 (No. 2) (35 & 36 Vict. c. 97))
Excise (No. 3) Act 1809 (repealed)	49 Geo. 3. c. 80	10 June 1809
An Act for allowing Dealers to road their own Coffee on certain Conditions. (Repealed by Statute Law Revision Act 1872 (No. 2) (35 & 36 Vict. c. 97))
Excise (No. 4) Act 1809 (repealed)	49 Geo. 3. c. 81	10 June 1809
An Act to amend several Laws of Excise relating to Paper, Silks, and Salt, and for authorizing the Seizure of Utensils in Cases where Vessels used in Excise Manufactures are subject to Forfeiture. (Repealed by Statute Law Revision Act 1861 (24 & 25 Vict. c. 101))
Local Militia (Great Britain) Act 1809 (repealed)	49 Geo. 3. c. 82	10 June 1809
An Act to amend several Acts passed in the last and present Sessions of Parliament, relating to the Local Militia. (Repealed for England and Wales by Local Militia (England) Act 1812 (52 Geo. 3. c. 38) and for Scotland by Local Militia (Scotland) Act 1812 (52 Geo. 3. c. 68))
Recognizances (Ireland) Act 1809 (repealed)	49 Geo. 3. c. 83	10 June 1809
An Act for the Amendment of the Laws now in force in Ireland, relative to Persons entering into Recognizances in Criminal Cases, in Custody under any Fine, or under such Recognizance. (Repealed by Recognisances (Ireland) Act 1817 (57 Geo. 3. c. 56))
Highways (Ireland) Act 1809 (repealed)	49 Geo. 3. c. 84	10 June 1809
An Act for amending the Irish Road Acts. (Repealed by Statute Law Revision Act 1872 (No. 2) (35 & 36 Vict. c. 97))
Militia Pay (Ireland) Act 1809 (repealed)	49 Geo. 3. c. 85	10 June 1809
An Act for defraying, until the Twenty-fifth Day of March One thousand eight hundred and ten, the Charge of the Pay and Clothing of the Militia of Ireland; for holding Courts Martial on Serjeant Majors, Serjeants, Corporals, and Drummers, for Offences commited during the Time such Militia shall not be embodied; and for making Allowances in certain Cases to Subaltern Officers of the said Militia during Peace. (Repealed by Statute Law Revision Act 1872 (No. 2) (35 & 36 Vict. c. 97))
Militia (Ireland) (No. 3) Act 1809 (repealed)	49 Geo. 3. c. 86	10 June 1809
An Act to make Provision, in certain Cases, for the Wives and Families of ballotted Men, Substitutes, and Volunteers, serving in the Militia of Ireland. (Repealed by Relief of Families of Militiamen (Ireland) Act 1811 (51 Geo. 3. c. 78))
Militia and Local Militia Pay (Great Britain) Act 1809 (repealed)	49 Geo. 3. c. 87	10 June 1809
An Act for defraying the Charge of the Pay and Clothing of the Militia and Local Militia in Great Britain for the Year One thousand eight hundred and nine. (Repealed by Statute Law Revision Act 1872 (No. 2) (35 & 36 Vict. c. 97))
Militia Allowances Act 1809 (repealed)	49 Geo. 3. c. 88	10 June 1809
An Act for making Allowances in certain Cases to Subaltern Officers of the Militia in Great Britain, while disembodied. (Repealed by Statute Law Revision Act 1872 (No. 2) (35 & 36 Vict. c. 97))
Militia Allowances (No. 2) Act 1809 (repealed)	49 Geo. 3. c. 89	10 June 1809
An Act to revive and continue until the Twenty-fifth Day of March One thousand eight hundred and ten, and amend so much of an Act, made in the Thirty-ninth and Fortieth Year of His present Majesty, (Note: Militia Allowances Act 1800 (39 & 40 Geo. 3. c. 44)) as grants certain Allowances to Adjutants and Serjeant Majors of the Militia of England, disembodied under an Act of the same Session of Parliament. (Note: Militia Act 1799 (39 & 40 Geo. 3. c. 1)) (Repealed by Statute Law Revision Act 1872 (No. 2) (35 & 36 Vict. c. 97))
Relief of Families of Militiamen (Scotland) Act 1809 (repealed)	49 Geo. 3. c. 90	10 June 1809
An Act for providing Relief for the Wives and Families of the Militia Men in Scotland, when called into actual Service. (Repealed by Militia (Voluntary Enlistment) Act 1875 (38 & 39 Vict. c. 69))
Justice of Assize Act 1809 (repealed)	49 Geo. 3. c. 91	10 June 1809
An Act to empower the Judges to try Civil Causes in their own Counties in England. (Repealed by Civil Procedure Acts Repeal Act 1879 (42 & 43 Vict. c. 59))
Charge of Loans Act 1809 (repealed)	49 Geo. 3. c. 92	10 June 1809
An Act for charging the Sum of Eleven Millions, raised for the Service of Great Britain for the Year One thousand eight hundred and nine, and the Sum of Seven Millions nine hundred and thirty-two thousand one hundred Pounds in Exchequer Bills, funded pursuant to an Act of this Session of Parliament, (Note: National Debt (No. 2) Act 1809 (49 Geo. 3. c. 71)) upon the Duties granted to His Majesty during the Continuance of the present War, and for certain Periods After the Ratification of a Treaty of Peace. (Repealed by Statute Law Revision Act 1872 (No. 2) (35 & 36 Vict. c. 97))
Exchequer Bills (No. 4) Act 1809 (repealed)	49 Geo. 3. c. 93	10 June 1809
An Act, to enable the Commissioners of His Majesty's Treasury to issue Exchequer Bills, on the Credit of such Aids or Supplies as have been or shall be granted by Parliament for the Service of Great Britain, for the Year One thousand eight hundred and nine. (Repealed by Statute Law Revision Act 1872 (No. 2) (35 & 36 Vict. c. 97))
Lotteries Act 1809 (repealed)	49 Geo. 3. c. 94	10 June 1809
An Act for granting to His Majesty a Sum of Money to be raised by Lotteries. (Repealed by Statute Law Revision Act 1872 (No. 2) (35 & 36 Vict. c. 97))
Auditing of Public Accounts Act 1809 (repealed)	49 Geo. 3. c. 95	10 June 1809
An Act for further regulating the Constitution of the Board of Commissioners for auditing the Publick Accounts. (Repealed by Statute Law Revision Act 1861 (24 & 25 Vict. c. 101))
Officers of Excise (No. 2) Act 1809 (repealed)	49 Geo. 3. c. 96	10 June 1809
An Act to provide for a durable Allowance of Superannuation to the Officers of Excise, under certain Restrictions. (Repealed by Statute Law Revision Act 1861 (24 & 25 Vict. c. 101))
Ordnance Services, Purfleet Act 1809	49 Geo. 3. c. 97	10 June 1809
An Act for empowering the Board of Ordnance to exchange Lands at Purfleet, in the County of Essex, for other Lands in the said Parish.
Customs (No. 3) Act 1809 (repealed)	49 Geo. 3. c. 98	10 June 1809
An Act for repealing the several Duties of Customs chargeable in Great Britain, and for granting other Duties in lieu thereof. (Repealed by Customs Law Repeal Act 1825 (6 Geo. 4. c. 105))
Spirits (Ireland) Act 1809 (repealed)	49 Geo. 3. c. 99	15 June 1809
An Act to amend the several Acts for the regulating and securing the Collection of the Duties on Spirits distilled in Ireland; and for the regulating the Sale of such Liquors by Retail. (Repealed by Statute Law Revision Act 1872 (No. 2) (35 & 36 Vict. c. 97))
Auction Duties (Ireland) Act 1809 (repealed)	49 Geo. 3. c. 100	15 June 1809
An Act to amend the several Acts for securing the Collection of the Duties on Auctions in Ireland. (Repealed by Statute Law Revision Act 1872 (No. 2) (35 & 36 Vict. c. 97))
Criminal Prosecutions Fees (Ireland) Act 1809 (repealed)	49 Geo. 3. c. 101	15 June 1809
An Act to regulate the Fees payable by Persons charged with Treason, Felony, and all other Offences, at Affixes and Quarter Sessions in Ireland; and for amending an Act of the Parliament of Ireland, made in the Thirty-sixth Year of His present Majesty, relating thereto. (Repealed by Costs in Criminal Cases Act (Northern Ireland) 1968 (c. 10 (N.I.)))
Drainage of Bogs, etc. (Ireland) Act 1809 (repealed)	49 Geo. 3. c. 102	15 June 1809
An Act to appoint Commissioners to enquire and examine, until the First Day of August One thousand eight hundred and eleven, into the Nature and Extent of the several Bogs in Ireland, and the Practicability of draining and cultivating them, and the best Means of effecting the same. (Repealed by Statute Law Revision Act 1872 (No. 2) (35 & 36 Vict. c. 97))
Building of Churches, etc. (Ireland) Act 1809 (repealed)	49 Geo. 3. c. 103	15 June 1809
An Act to amend an Act made in the last Session of Parliament9 for making Provision for the building and re-building of Churches, Chapels, and Glebe Houses in Ireland. (Repealed by Church Temporalities (Ireland) Act 1833 (3 & 4 Will. 4. c. 37))
Life Annuities Act 1809 (repealed)	49 Geo. 3. c. 104	15 June 1809
An Act to amend several Acts made in the Parliament of Ireland, for granting Life Annuities with Benefit of Survivorship. (Repealed by Statute Law Revision Act 1872 (No. 2) (35 & 36 Vict. c. 97))
Importation (No. 7) Act 1809 (repealed)	49 Geo. 3. c. 105	15 June 1809
An Act to continue, until the Twenty-fifth Day of March One thousand eight hundred and ten, an Act of this present Session of Parliament, (Note: Importation Act 1809 (49 Geo. 3. c. 8)) to suspend the Importation of British or Irish made Spirits into Great Britain or Ireland respectively. (Repealed by Statute Law Revision Act 1872 (No. 2) (35 & 36 Vict. c. 97))
Warehoused Goods Act 1809 (repealed)	49 Geo. 3. c. 106	15 June 1809
An Act for allowing further Time for taking Goods out of Warehouse, and paying Duties thereon. (Repealed by Statute Law Revision Act 1861 (24 & 25 Vict. c. 101))
Penalties, etc., in British America Act 1809 (repealed)	49 Geo. 3. c. 107	15 June 1809
An Act for the more effectual Recovery of Penalties and Forfeitures, incurred in the British Colonies and Plantations in America. (Repealed by Customs Law Repeal Act 1825 (6 Geo. 4. c. 105))
Wages and Prize Money, etc., in the Navy Act 1809 (repealed)	49 Geo. 3. c. 108	15 June 1809
An Act to amend the several Acts respecting the Payment of Wages and Prize Money, and Allotment of Wages, to Persons serving in His Majesty's Royal Navy. (Repealed by Pay of the Navy Act 1830 (11 Geo. 4 & 1 Will. 4. c. 20))
Woollen Manufacture Act 1809 (repealed)	49 Geo. 3. c. 109	15 June 1809
An Act to repeal several Acts respecting the Woollen Manufacture, and to amend other Acts relating to the said Manufacture; and for allowing Persons employed in any Branch of the Woollen Manufacture to set up Trade in any Place in Great Britain. (Repealed by Statute Law Revision Act 1872 (No. 2) (35 & 36 Vict. c. 97))
Pension Duties (No. 2) Act 1809 (repealed)	49 Geo. 3. c. 110	15 June 1809
An Act to rectify a Mistake in an Act made in this Session of Parliament, (Note: Pension Duties Act 1809 (49 Geo. 3. c. 32)) for continuing and making perpetual several Duties of One Shilling and Sixpence on Offices and Employments. (Repealed by Statute Law Revision Act 1958 (6 & 7 Eliz. 2. c. 46))
Inquiry into Military Departments Act 1809 (repealed)	49 Geo. 3. c. 111	15 June 1809
An Act to continue until the Twenty-fifth Day of March One thousand eight hundred and eleven, an Act of the Forty fifth Year of His present Majesty, (Note: Inquiry into Military Departments Act 1805 (45 Geo. 3. c. 47)) for appointing Commissioners to enquire into the publick Expenditure, and the Conduct of the publick Business in the Military Departments therein mentioned. (Repealed by Statute Law Revision Act 1872 (No. 2) (35 & 36 Vict. c. 97))
Lands for the Defence of the Realm Act 1809 (repealed)	49 Geo. 3. c. 112	15 June 1809
An Act to amend an Act passed in the Forty-fourth Year of His present Majesty, (Note: Defence of the Realm Act 1804 (44 Geo. 3. c. 95)) to provide for the Defence of the Realm, with respect to the Purchase of Lands and Hereditaments for the publick Service. (Repealed by Statute Law Revision Act 1861 (24 & 25 Vict. c. 101))
Volunteers and Local Militia Act 1809 (repealed)	49 Geo. 3. c. 113	15 June 1809
An Act for better regulating the Office of Agent General for Volunteers and Local Militia. (Repealed by Statute Law Revision Act 1872 (No. 2) (35 & 36 Vict. c. 97))
Exchequer Bills Act 1809 (repealed)	49 Geo. 3. c. 114	15 June 1809
An Act for enabling His Majesty to raise the Sum of Three Millions for the Service of Great Britain. (Repealed by Statute Law Revision Act 1872 (No. 2) (35 & 36 Vict. c. 97))
Insolvent Debtors Relief Act 1809 (repealed)	49 Geo. 3. c. 115	19 June 1809
An Act for the Relief of certain Insolvent Debtors in England. (Repealed by Statute Law Revision Act 1872 (No. 2) (35 & 36 Vict. c. 97))
Customs and Excise (Ireland) Act 1809 (repealed)	49 Geo. 3. c. 116	19 June 1809
An Act to make further Provision for the Execution of the several Acts relating to the Revenues, Matters, and Things, under the Management of the Commissioners of Customs and Port Duties, and of the Commissioners of Inland Excise and Taxes in Ireland. (Repealed by Statute Law Revision Act 1861 (24 & 25 Vict. c. 101))
Excise (Great Britain) Act 1809 (repealed)	49 Geo. 3. c. 117	19 June 1809
An Act for lowering the Duty of Excise on Coffee, of the Growth of His Majesty's Dominions in Africa. (Repealed by Statute Law Revision Act 1861 (24 & 25 Vict. c. 101))
Parliamentary Elections Act 1809 (repealed)	49 Geo. 3. c. 118	19 June 1809
An Act for better securing the Independence and Purity of Parliament, by preventing the procuring or obtaining of Seats in Parliament by corrupt Practices. (Repealed by Corrupt Practices Prevention Act 1854 (17 & 18 Vict. c. 102))
Administration of Justice (Scotland) Act 1809 (repealed)	49 Geo. 3. c. 119	19 June 1809
An Act to give to the Persons named by His Majesty, pursuant to an Act passed in the last Session of Parliament, intituled, "An Act concerning the Administration of Justice in Scotland, and concerning Appeals to the House of Lords," (Note: Court of Session Act 1808 (48 Geo. 3. c. 151)) further Time for making their Report or Reports. (Repealed by Statute Law Revision Act 1872 (No. 2) (35 & 36 Vict. c. 97))
Militia (Ireland) Act 1809 (repealed)	49 Geo. 3. c. 120	19 June 1809
An Act for amending and reducing into One Act of Parliament the several Laws for raising and training the Militia of Ireland. (Repealed by Northern Ireland (Lieutenancy) Order 1975 (SI 1975/156))
Bankrupts (England and Ireland) Act 1809 (repealed)	49 Geo. 3. c. 121	20 June 1809
An Act to alter and amend the Laws relating to Bankrupts. (Repealed by Statute Law Revision Act 1861 (24 & 25 Vict. c. 101))
Frauds by Boatmen and others, etc. Act 1809 (repealed)	49 Geo. 3. c. 122	20 June 1809
An Act for preventing Frauds and Depredations committed on Merchants, Ship Owners, and Underwriters, by Boatmen and others, and also for remedying certain Defects relative to the Adjustment of Salvage in England, under an Act made in the Twelfth Year of Queen Anne. (Note: Stranded Ships Act 1713 (13 Ann. c. 21)) (Repealed by Wreck and Salvage Act 1846 (9 & 10 Vict. c. 99))
Prize Money Act 1809 (repealed)	49 Geo. 3. c. 123	20 June 1809
An Act to explain and amend an Act made in the Forty-fifth Year of His present Majesty, (Note: Manning of the Navy Act 1805 (45 Geo. 3. c. 72)) for the Encouragement of Seamen, and for the better and more effectually manning His Majesty's Navy during the present War; and for the further Encouragement of Seamen, and for the better and more effectually providing for the Interest of the Royal Hospital for Seamen at Greenwich, and the Royal Hospital for Soldiers at Chelsea; and to extend the Provisions of the said Act to Cases arising in consequence of Hostilities commenced since the passing of the said Act. (Repealed by Naval Prize Acts Repeal Act 1864 (27 & 28 Vict. c. 23))
Poor (Settlement and Removal) Act 1809 (repealed)	49 Geo. 3. c. 124	20 June 1809
An Act for altering, amending, and explaining certain Acts relative to the Removal of the Poor, and for making Regulations in certain Cases touching the Examination of Paupers as to their Settlement; and for extending to all Parishes certain Rules and Orders in Workhouses, under an Act of the Twenty-second Year of His present Majesty, intituled, "An Act for the better Relief and Employment of the Poor." (Note: Relief of the Poor Act 1782 (22 Geo. 3. c. 83)) (Repealed by Poor Law Act 1927 (17 & 18 Geo. 5. c. 14))
Friendly Societies Act 1809 (repealed)	49 Geo. 3. c. 125	20 June 1809
An Act to amend an Act made in the Thirty-third Year of His present Majesty, (Note: Friendly Societies Act 1793 (33 Geo. 3. c. 54)) for the Encouragement and Relief of Friendly Societies. (Repealed by Friendly Societies Act 1855 (18 & 19 Vict. c. 63))
Sale of Offices Act 1809 (repealed)	49 Geo. 3. c. 126	20 June 1809
An Act for the further Prevention of the Sale and Brokerage of Offices. (Repealed by Statute Law (Repeals) Act 2013 (c. 2))
Salaries of Chief Baron, etc. Act 1809 (repealed)	49 Geo. 3. c. 127	20 June 1809
An Act for further augmenting the Salaries of certain of the Judges of the Courts in Westminster Hall, and of the Chief and Second Justice of Chester, and Justices of the Great Sessions in Wales. (Repealed by Statute Law Revision Act 1861 (24 & 25 Vict. c. 101))
Appropriation Act 1809 (repealed)	49 Geo. 3. c. 128	20 June 1809
An Act for granting to His Majesty certain Sums of Money out of the Consolidated Fund of Great Britain, and for applying certain Monies therein-mentioned for the Service of the Year One thousand eight hundred and nine; and for further appropriating the Supplies granted in this Session of Parliament. (Repealed by Statute Law Revision Act 1872 (No. 2) (35 & 36 Vict. c. 97))
Militia (Great Britain) (No. 3) Act 1809 (repealed)	49 Geo. 3. c. 129	21 June 1809
An Act to prevent the enlisting of Local Militia Men into the Regular Militia of any other County or Stewartry than the County or Stewartry to which they belong. (Repealed by Militia Act 1816 (56 Geo. 3. c. 64))

=== Local acts ===
Short title	Citation	Royal assent
Long title
Watchett Harbour and Quay Act 1809 (repealed)	49 Geo. 3. c. i	22 February 1809
An Act for continuing the Term and Powers of several Acts passed for repairing the Harbour and Quay of Watchett, in the County of Somerset. (Repealed by Watchet Harbour Act 1857 (20 & 21 Vict. c. cxli))
River Derwent (Cumberland) Fishery Act 1809 (repealed)	49 Geo. 3. c. ii	13 March 1809
An Act for amending an Act of the Forty-fourth Year of His present Majesty, (Note: Solway Firth Fisheries Act 1804 (44 Geo. 3. c. xlv)) for regulating certain Fisheries in the County of Cumberland, and other Places therein mentioned, so far as respects the Fishery in the River Derwent. (Repealed by Salmon Fishery Act 1861 (24 & 25 Vict. c. 109))
Aberdeenshire Canal Navigation Act 1809	49 Geo. 3. c. iii	13 March 1809
An Act for better enabling the Company of Proprietors of the Aberdeenshire Canal Navigation to raise the necessary Fund to complete the same.
Gainsburgh Improvement and Coal Trade Act 1809	49 Geo. 3. c. iv	13 March 1809
An Act for more effectually improving the Streets, Lanes, and Publick Passages, in the Town of Gainsburgh, (Note: Gainsborough, Lincolnshire.) in the County of Lincoln, and for laying a Duty on Coals brought to the said Town to be sold.
Rotherham and Swinton Road Act 1809 (repealed)	49 Geo. 3. c. v	13 March 1809
An Act for making and maintaining a Road from Rotherham to Swinton, in the West Riding of the County of York. (Repealed by Rotherham and Swinton Turnpike Road (Yorkshire, West Riding) Act 1827 (7 & 8 Geo. 4. c. lviii))
Ashbourne and Yoxall, and Hatton Moor and Tutbury Roads and Branches Act 1809 (repealed)	49 Geo. 3. c. vi	13 March 1809
An Act for enlarging the Term and Powers of Two Acts of His present Majesty, (Note: Derby and Stafford Roads Act 1766 (6 Geo. 3. c. 79)) (Note: Derby and Stafford Roads Act 1787 (27 Geo. 3. c. 87)) for repairing the Road from Ashbourn to Sudbury, and from Sudbury to Yoxall Bridge, and from Hatton Moor to Tutbury, in the Counties of Derby and Stafford, and for making Two new Branches of Road to communicate therewith. (Repealed by Ashbourne, Hatton Moor, Uttoxeter and Hadley Plain Roads Act 1830 (11 Geo. 4 & 1 Will. 4. c. lxxxix))
Roads in Derbyshire, Leicestershire and Warwickshire Act 1809	49 Geo. 3. c. vii	13 March 1809
An Act for enlarging the Term and Powers of Two Acts of His late and present Majesty, (Note: Derby, Leicester and Warwick Roads Act 1759 (33 Geo. 2. c. 47)) (Note: Derby, Leicester and Warwick Roads Act 1781 (21 Geo. 3. c. 92)) for repairing several Roads in the Counties of Derby, Leicester, and Warwick.
Radcliffe and Ainsworth Inclosures Act 1809	49 Geo. 3. c. viii	13 March 1809
An Act for inclosing Lands in the Parish of Radcliffe, and the Township of Ainsworth, in the Parish of Middleton, in the County Palatine of Lancaster.
Workington and Winscales Inclosures Act 1809	49 Geo. 3. c. ix	20 March 1809
An Act for inclosing Lands in the Townships of Workington and Winscales, and Manor of Workington, in the Parish of Workington, in the County of Cumberland.
Sheerness Pier Act 1809	49 Geo. 3. c. x	24 March 1809
An Act for amending so much of an Act of the Forty-first Year of His present Majesty, (Note: Sheerness Pier and Improvement Act 1801 (41 Geo. 3. (U.K.) c. liv)) for building and keeping in Repair the Pier at Sheerness in the Isle of Sheppy, in the County of Kent and for other purposes therein mentioned, as relates to the said Pier.
Road from Saltney to Flint Act 1809	49 Geo. 3. c. xi	24 March 1809
An Act to continue the Term, and alter the Powers, of an Act of His present Majesty, (Note: Flint Roads Act 1788 (28 Geo. 3. c. 101)) for repairing the Road from the Township of Saltney, in the County of Flint, to the Town of Flint.
Road from Horsham Act 1809 (repealed)	49 Geo. 3. c. xii	24 March 1809
An Act for making and maintaining a Road from Horsham to join the Turnpike Road leading to Guildford, with Two Branches therefrom, in the Counties of Sussex and Surrey. (Repealed by Road from Horsham Act 1830 (11 Geo. 4 & 1 Will. 4. c. vi))
Boconnoc, Bradddock and St. Winnow Inclosures Act 1809	49 Geo. 3. c. xiii	24 March 1809
An Act for inclosing Lands in the Parishes of Boconock, Braddock, and Saint Winnow, in the County of Cornwall.
Roads in Brecon, Radnor and Glamorgan Act 1809 (repealed)	49 Geo. 3. c. xiv	30 March 1809
An Act for more effectually repairing, improving, and keeping in Repair several Roads in the Counties of Brecon, Radnor, and Glarmorgan, and for making and maintaining Two new Branches of Road to communicate therewith. (Repealed by Roads in Brecon, Radnor and Glamorgan Act 1830 (11 Geo. 4 & 1 Will. 4. c. xxviii))
Roads in Carmarthen (Llandovery District) Act 1809 (repealed)	49 Geo. 3. c. xv	28 April 1809
An Act for enlarging the Term and Powers of an Act of His present Majesty, (Note: Carmarthen Roads Act 1788 (28 Geo. 3. c. 109)) for repairing several Roads in the Counties of Carmarthen and Cardigan, so far as relates to the Llandovery District and for amending certain other Roads communicating therewith. (Repealed by Roads in Carmarthen Act 1831 (1 Will. 4. c. lviii))
Hockliffe and Stony Stratford Road Act 1809 (repealed)	49 Geo. 3. c. xvi	28 April 1809
An Act for enlarging the Term and Powers of Three Acts of His late and present Majesty, (Note: Hockliffe and Stony Stratford Road Act 1739 (13 Geo. 2. c. 9)) (Note: Hockliffe and Stony Stratford Road Act 1754 (27 Geo. 2. c. 21)) (Note: Hockliffe and Stony Stratford Road Act 1786 (26 Geo. 3. c. 143)) for repairing the Road between Hockliffe in the County of Bedford and Stony Stratford in the County of Buckingham. (Repealed by Hockliffe and Stony Stratford Road Act 1830 (11 Geo. 4 & 1 Will. 4. c. lxxxiii))
Bristol Dock Company Act 1809 (repealed)	49 Geo. 3. c. xvii	28 April 1809
An Act to enable the Bristol Dock Company to borrow a further Sum of Money for completing the Improvements of the Port and Harbour of Bristol. (Repealed by Bristol Dock Company Act 1848 (11 & 12 Vict. c. xliii))
Clergy Orphan Corporation Act 1809	49 Geo. 3. c. xviii	28 April 1809
An Act for establishing and well-governing the Charitable Institution called The Society of Stewards and Subscribers for maintaining and educating Poor Orphans of Clergymen until of Age to be put Apprentice; and for incorporating such Society; and for more effectually enabling them to carry on their charitable and useful Designs.
Wakefield and Halifax Road Act 1809 (repealed)	49 Geo. 3. c. xix	28 April 1809
An Act for enlarging the Term and Powers of several Acts of His late and present Majesty, (Note: Wakefield, etc., Roads Act 1740 (14 Geo. 2. c. 19)) (Note: Yorkshire Roads Act 1757 (30 Geo. 2. c. 54)) (Note: Wakefield and Halifax Roads Act 1793 (33 Geo. 3. c. 129)) for repairing the Road from Wakefield to Halifax, in the West Riding of the County of York. (Repealed by Wakefield and Halifax Road Act 1828 (9 Geo. 4. c. lxix))
Dublin Public Money Collection Act 1809	49 Geo. 3. c. xx	28 April 1809
An Act to alter and amend an Act of the Parliament of Ireland passed in the Thirty-third Year of His present Majesty, intituled, "An Act respecting the Collection of publick Money to be levied in the County of the City of Dublin by Presentment;" (Note: Dublin Grand Jury Presentments Act 1793 (33 Geo. 3. c. 56 (I))) and for the better Regulation of the Mode of Election and Office of Treasurer of the publick Money of the City of Dublin.
Edinburgh Improvement Act 1809 (repealed)	49 Geo. 3. c. xxi	28 April 1809
An Act for extending the Royalty of the City of Edinburgh; for disannexing Part of the Parish of Saint Cuthbert's from the said Parish, and uniting it to the Parish of Saint Andrew; for further regulating the Assessment for the Poor in the said Parishes; for erecting Two new Churches; for discontinuing certain Churches, and annexing the Parishes thereof to other Parishes; for further regulating the Revenues of the said City applicable to the Payment of Ministers' Stipends, and for draining the Meadow on the South Side of the said City. (Repealed by Edinburgh Municipal and Police Act 1879 (42 & 43 Vict. c. cxxxii))
Sunderland Poor Rates Act 1809 (repealed)	49 Geo. 3. c. xxii	28 April 1809
An Act for explaining and amending an Act passed in the Thirty-first Year of His present Majesty, (Note: Sunderland Poor Relief Act 1791 (31 Geo. 3. c. 87)) for the better Maintenance and Support of the Poor of the Parish of Sunderland near the Sea, in the County Palatine of Durham, and for increasing the Rates therein directed to be imposed. (Repealed by Statute Law (Repeals) Act 2008 (c. 12))
Gloucester and Cheltenham Railway Act 1809 (repealed)	49 Geo. 3. c. xxiii	28 April 1809
An Act for making and maintaining a Railway of Tram Road from the River Severn at the Quay in the City of Gloucester, to or near to a certain Gate in or near the Town of Cheltenham, in the County of Gloucester, called The Knapp Toll Gate, with a collateral Branch to the Top of Leckhampton Hill, in the Parish of Leckhampton, in the said County. (Repealed by Gloucester and Cheltenham Tramroads Abandonment Act 1859 (22 & 23 Vict. c. xl))
Caernarvon Harbour Act 1809	49 Geo. 3. c. xxiv	28 April 1809
An Act for the further Improvement of the Harbour of Carnarvon in the County of Carnarvon, and for other Purposes relating thereto.
Rochdale Water Act 1809 (repealed)	49 Geo. 3. c. xxv	28 April 1809
An Act for better supplying the Inhabitants of the Town of Rochdale and the Neighbourhood thereof with Water. (Repealed by Rochdale Water Act 1839 (2 & 3 Vict. c. xxiv))
Redcross Turnpike Road (Cambridgeshire) Act 1809 (repealed)	49 Geo. 3. c. xxvi	28 April 1809
An Act to continue and amend Two Acts (Note: Cambridge Roads Act 1766 (6 Geo. 3. c. 84)) (Note: Cambridge Roads Act 1773 (13 Geo. 3. c. 110)) for repairing and widening the Road from the present Turnpike Road at Haverhill to Redcross in the Parish of Shelford in the County of Cambridge. (Repealed by Haverhill to Redcross Road (Suffolk, Cambridgeshire) Act 1830 (11 Geo. 4 & 1 Will. 4. c. xxxviii))
Road from the Poole and Wimborne Minster Turnpike Road Act 1809 (repealed)	49 Geo. 3. c. xxvii	28 April 1809
An Act for continuing the Term and enlarging the Powers of Two Acts of His present Majesty, (Note: Dorset and Somerset Roads Act 1766 (7 Geo. 3. c. 82)) (Note: Poole to Blandford Road Act 1777 (17 Geo. 3. c. 86)) for repairing several Roads therein described, so far as the same relate to the Road from the Turnpike Road between the Town and County of Poole and Wimborne Minster in the County of Dorset, to the Turnpike Road between Blandford Forum and Dorchester in the County of Dorset. (Repealed by Vale of Blackmoor Turnpike Roads Act 1824 (5 Geo. 4. c. cxlv))
Kent and Sussex Roads Act 1809 (repealed)	49 Geo. 3. c. xxviii	28 April 1809
An Act for continuing the Term and enlarging the Powers of Two Acts of His present Majesty, (Note: Kent and Sussex Roads Act 1762 (2 Geo. 3. c. 67)) (Note: Kent and Sussex Roads (No. 2) Act 1787 (27 Geo. 3. c. 80)) for repairing the Roads from Kipping's Cross to Lamberhurst Pound and Pullen's Hill, in the County of Kent, and to Flimwell Vent in the County of Sussex, and certain other Roads in the said Acts described. (Repealed by Kipping's Cross and Flimwell Vent Road (Kent and Sussex) Act 1829 (10 Geo. 4. c. xxvi))
Cheltenham to Gloucester Road Act 1809 (repealed)	49 Geo. 3. c. xxix	28 April 1809
An Act for making and maintaining a Road from the First small Bridge or Culvert which crosses the present Turnpike Road from Cheltenham to Gloucester, on the Gloucester Side of Staverton Bridge, to join the same Turnpike Road in the Town of Cheltenham in the County of Gloucester. (Repealed by Road from Cheltenham to Gloucester Act 1825 (6 Geo. 4. c. cxlvii))
Road from Glasgow to Garscube Act 1809 (repealed)	49 Geo. 3. c. xxx	28 April 1809
An Act for maintaining and repairing the Road leading from the City of Glasgow, through Cowcaddens, to that Part of the River of Kelvin called The Milnford of Garscube. (Repealed by Glasgow and Milnford of Garscube Road Act 1830 (11 Geo. 4 & 1 Will. 4. c. cxxviii))
Road from North Queensferry to Perth Act 1809 (repealed)	49 Geo. 3. c. xxxi	28 April 1809
An Act for more effectually making and repairing the Great North Road leading from the North Queensferry in the County of Fife to the City of Perth, and to the Town of Dunfermline. (Repealed by Roads from North Queensferry to Perth Act 1829 (10 Geo. 4. c. lxi))
Ayr (County) Roads Act 1809 (repealed)	49 Geo. 3. c. xxxii	28 April 1809
An Act for altering an Act passed in the Forty-fifth Year of His present Majesty, (Note: Ayr (County) Turnpike Roads Act 1805 (45 Geo. 3. c. xxviii)) for repairing Roads in the County of Ayr. (Repealed by Ayr (County) Turnpike Roads Act 1827 (7 & 8 Geo. 4. c. cix))
Road from Godstone to Highgate (Sussex) Act 1809 (repealed)	49 Geo. 3. c. xxxiii	28 April 1809
An Act to continue the Term and enlarge the Powers of Three Acts passed in the Fourth Year of His late Majesty, (Note: Surrey and Sussex Roads Act 1730 (4 Geo. 2. c. 8)) and the Sixth (Note: Godstone to Highgate Road Act 1766 (6 Geo. 3. c. 58)) and Twenty-sixth (Note: Sussex Roads Act 1786 (26 Geo. 3. c. 147)) Years of His present Majesty, for repairing the Road from Godstone in the County of Surrey, to Highgate in the Parish of East Grinstead in the County of Sussex. (Repealed by Road from Godstone to Highgate (Sussex) Act 1828 (9 Geo. 4. c. cx))
Enfield Chase and Lemsford Mill Road Act 1809 (repealed)	49 Geo. 3. c. xxxiv	28 April 1809
An Act to enlarge the Term and Powers of several Acts (Note: Middlesex and Hertford Roads Act 1729 (3 Geo. 2. c. 10)) (Note: Middlesex and Hertford Roads Act 1743 (17 Geo. 2. c. 14)) (Note: Middlesex and Hertford Roads Act 1770 (10 Geo. 3. c. 71)) (Note: Hertford Roads Act 1778 (18 Geo. 3. c. 90)) for repairing the Road leading from Galley Corner adjoining to Enfield Chase in the Parish of South Mims in the County of Middlesex, to Lemsford Mill in the County of Hertford. (Repealed by Enfield Chase Road Act 1831 (1 Will. 4. c. lx))
Mildmay's Estate (Timber Felling) Act 1809	49 Geo. 3. c. xxxv	28 April 1809
An Act for allowing the Timber on Part of the settled Estates of Dame Jane St. John Mildmay Widow, in the Counties of Essex, Somerset, Dorset, and Southampton, to be cut down and for applying the Monies thence arising in the Purchase of Estates to be settled in Manner therein mentioned.
Roads in Peebles Act 1809 (repealed)	49 Geo. 3. c. xxxvi	12 May 1809
An Act for repairing and amending certain Roads in the County of Peebles, and for better regulating the Statute Labour within the same. (Repealed by Turnpike Roads in Peebles Act 1830 (11 Geo. 4 & 1 Will. 4. c. cviii))
Roads in Edinburgh Act 1809	49 Geo. 3. c. xxxvii	12 May 1809
An Act for rendering more effectual several Acts (Note: Edinburgh and Leith Road Act 1750 (24 Geo. 2. c. 35)) (Note: Edinburgh Roads Act 1755 (28 Geo. 2. c. 39)) (Note: Edinburgh and Linlighgow Roads Act 1764 (4 Geo. 3. c. 86)) (Note: Edinburgh Roads Act 1783 (24 Geo. 3. Sess. 1. c. 18)) (Note: Edinburgh (Streets) Act 1785 (25 Geo. 3. c. 28)) (Note: Edinburgh Roads Act 1789 (29 Geo. 3. c. 105)) (Note: Edinburgh County Roads and Bridges Act 1798 (38 Geo. 3. c. xlv)) (Note: Roads in Edinburgh Act 1803 (43 Geo. 3. c. xxxiv)) for repairing the Turnpike and other High Roads in the County of Edinburgh, and for repairing the Roads from the City of Edinburgh to the Town of Leith.
Road from Carlowrie Bridge Act 1809 (repealed)	49 Geo. 3. c. xxxviii	12 May 1809
An Act for more effectually making and repairing the Road from Carlowrie Bridge on the River Almond, to Linlithgow Bridge on the River Avon, and other Roads in the County of Linlithgow. (Repealed by Carlowrie Bridge and Linlithgow Bridge Road Act 1831 (1 Will. 4. c. lxiv))
St. Anne Limehouse Poor Rates Act 1809 (repealed)	49 Geo. 3. c. xxxix	12 May 1809
An Act for more equally and effectually assessing and collecting the Poor Rates within the Parish of Saint Anne (commonly called Saint Anne Limehouse) in the County of Middlesex. (Repealed by London Government (Borough of Stepney) Order in Council 1901 (SR&O 1901/276))
St. Nicholas, Rochester, Poor Rates Act 1809 (repealed)	49 Geo. 3. c. xl	12 May 1809
An Act for better assessing and collecting the Poor and other Rates in the Parish of Saint Nicholas, in the City of Rochester, in the County of Kent, and regulating the Poor thereof. (Repealed by County of Kent Act 1981 (c. xviii))
River Wear and Sunderland Harbour Improvement Act 1809 (repealed)	49 Geo. 3. c. xli	12 May 1809
An Act for repealing an Act passed in the Twenty-fifth Year of His present Majesty, (Note: Sunderland Harbour Act 1785 (25 Geo. 3. c. 26)) for the Improvement of the River Wear and Port and Haven of Sunderland, in the County Palatine of Durham, and for the more effectual Preservation and further Improvement of the same River, Port, and Haven. (Repealed by River Wear and Sunderland Harbour Act 1830 (11 Geo. 4 & 1 Will. 4. c. xlix))
Stratford-upon-Avon Canal Navigation Act 1809	49 Geo. 3. c. xlii	12 May 1809
An Act to amend and enlarge the Powers of the several Acts relating to the Stratford-upon-Avon Canal Navigation.
Wisbech Drainage Act 1809	49 Geo. 3. c. xliii	12 May 1809
An Act for amending and rendering more effectual an Act passed in the Fifteenth Year of His present Majesty, (Note: Isle of Ely, etc., (Drainage) Act 1775 (15 Geo. 3. c. 66)) for draining and preferring certain Lands and Grounds in the Parishes of Wisbech Saint Peter's and Wisbech Saint Mary's, and in the Hamlets of Wisbech Murrow and Wisbech Guyhirn, in the Isle of Ely, and County of Cambridge.
Thurlton, Haddiscoe and Thorpe-next-Haddiscoe Inclosure and Drainage Act 1809	49 Geo. 3. c. xliv	12 May 1809
An Act for inclosing and draining Lands in the Parishes of Thurlton, Haddiscoe, and Thorpe next Haddiscoe, in the County of Norfolk.
Road from Harlow Bush Common to Stump Cross Act 1809 (repealed)	49 Geo. 3. c. xlv	12 May 1809
An Act for enlarging the Term and Powers of several Acts of His late and present Majesty, (Note: Essex and Hertfordshire Roads Act 1743 (17 Geo. 2. c. 9)) (Note: Essex and Herts Roads Act 1769 (9 Geo. 3. c. 51)) (Note: Essex and Hertfordshire Roads Act 1791 (31 Geo. 3. c. 99)) for repairing the Road from Harlow Bush Common to Stump Cross, in the County of Essex. (Repealed by Road from Harlow Bush Common to Stump Cross Act 1829 (10 Geo. 4. c. xxi))
Road from Northfield to the Wootton Turnpike Act 1809	49 Geo. 3. c. xlvi	12 May 1809
An Act for enlarging the Term and Powers of Two Acts passed in the Seventh (Note: Worcester and Warwick Roads Act 1766 (7 Geo. 3. c. 68)) and Twenty-eighth (Note: Worcester and Warwick Roads (No. 2) Act 1788 (28 Geo. 3. c. 115)) Years of His present Majesty, for amending and widening the Road from the Bell Inn at Northfield, in the County of Worcester, to the Wootton Turnpike, in the great Turnpike Road from Stratford-upon-Avon, in the County of Warwick, to Birmingham, in the same County.
Walsall and Hamstead Bridge Road (Staffordshire) Act 1809 (repealed)	49 Geo. 3. c. xlvii	12 May 1809
An Act for enlarging the Term and Powers of an Act passed in the Twenty-eighth Year of His present Majesty, (Note: Stafford Roads Act 1788 (28 Geo. 3. c. 98)) for widening and keeping in Repair the Road from the Town of Walsall to Hamstead Bridge, and other Roads therein mentioned, all in the County of Stafford. (Repealed by Walsall Roads Act 1831 (1 Will. 4. c.xlvi))
Road through Guildford Act 1809	49 Geo. 3. c. xlviii	12 May 1809
An Act for continuing the Term and Powers of several Acts of His late and present Majesty, (Note: Guildford and Arundel Road Act 1757 (30 Geo. 2. c. 60)) (Note: Surrey and Sussex Roads Act 1778 (18 Geo. 3. c. 110)) (Note: Guildford and New Bridge Road Act 1799 (39 Geo. 3. c. xxxiv)) for repairing the Road from Dapdon Wharf, near Guldeford, through Guldeford, to Alford Bars, in the County of Surrey.
Road to Henfield Act 1809 (repealed)	49 Geo. 3. c. xlix	12 May 1809
An Act for enlarging the Term and Powers of Two Acts of His present Majesty, (Note: Sussex Roads (No. 3) Act 1771 (11 Geo. 3. c. 99)) (Note: Horsham Roads Act 1792 (32 Geo. 3. c. 115)) for repairing the Road from Handcross to Henfield, and from Beeding to Horsham, in the County of Sussex. (Repealed by Roads through Cowfold Act 1830 (11 Geo. 4 & 1 Will. 4. c. civ))
Road from Teddington (Worcestershire) Act 1809 (repealed)	49 Geo. 3. c. l	12 May 1809
An Act for enlarging the Term and Powers of an Act of His present Majesty, (Note: Worcester Roads Act 1789 (29 Geo. 3. c. 102)) for amending the Road from Teddington to the Turnpike Road between Evesham and Pershore, in the County of Worcester, and for making a new Piece of Road to communicate therewith, in the County of Gloucester. (Repealed by Evesham and Cheltenham Turnpike Roads Act 1824 (5 Geo. 4. c. cxl))
Rickmansworth, Pinner and Harrow-on-the-Hill Road Act 1809 (repealed)	49 Geo. 3. c. li	12 May 1809
An Act for repairing, widening, and improving the Road leading from the Town of Rickmersworth, in the County of Hertford, through the Village of Pinner, by Harrow-on-the-Hill, in the County of Middlesex, to or near the Swan Publick House at Sudbury Common, in the Turnpike Road leading from Harrow to London. (Repealed by Rickmansworth and Pinner Road Act 1830 (11 Geo. 4 & 1 Will. 4. c. cxiii))
Roads in Stafford, Salop. and Chester (Second District) Act 1809	49 Geo. 3. c. lii	12 May 1809
An Act for continuing the Term and altering and enlarging the Powers of so much of Two Acts (Note: Stafford and Chester Roads Act 1769 (9 Geo. 3. c. 94)) (Note: Chester Roads Act 1788 (28 Geo. 3. c. 111)) for repairing the Road from the End of the County of Stafford, in the Post Road towards the City of Chester, through Woore, in the County of Salop, to Nantwich in the County of Chester, and from Nantwich to Tarporley, and from thence through Tarvin, in the said County of Chester, to the said City of Chester, and the Road from Northwich to the Cross in Tarvin aforesaid, as relates to the Second District of Roads comprized in the said Acts.
Blackburn and Burscough Bridge Road Act 1809 (repealed)	49 Geo. 3. c. liii	12 May 1809
An Act to continue the Term and enlarge the Powers of an Act (Note: Blackburn to Burscough Bridge Road Act 1793 (33 Geo. 3. c. 134)) for repairing the Road from Blackburn to Burscough Bridge, in the County of Lancaster. (Repealed by Blackburn and Walton-in-le-Dale Road Act 1830 (11 Geo. 4 & 1 Will. 4. c. lxxxv))
Tenterden Road Act 1809	49 Geo. 3. c. liv	12 May 1809
An Act for continuing the Term and enlarging the Powers of Two Acts of His present Majesty, (Note: Tenterden &c. Road Act 1766 (7 Geo. 3. c. 103)) (Note: Kent Roads (No. 3) Act 1786 (26 Geo. 3. c. 145)) for repairing the Road from the Town of Tenterden to the several Places therein mentioned, in the County of Kent.
Wareham and Purbeck Roads Act 1809 (repealed)	49 Geo. 3. c. lv	12 May 1809
An Act for continuing Two Acts of the Sixth (Note: Wareham and Purbeck Roads Act 1766 (6 Geo. 3. c. 92)) and Twenty-sixth (Note: Wareham and Purbeck Roads Act 1786 (26 Geo. 3. c. 122)) Years of His present Majesty, for repairing several Roads leading from the Town of Wareham, and in Purbeck, in the County of Dorset. (Repealed by Wareham and Purbeck Roads Act 1830 (11 Geo. 4 & 1 Will. 4. c. ci))
Newton Abbott and Kingswear Road Act 1809 (repealed)	49 Geo. 3. c. lvi	12 May 1809
An Act for continuing the Term and enlarging the Powers of Two Acts (Note: Devon Roads Act 1765 (5 Geo. 3. c. 69)) (Note: Devon Roads Act 1783 (24 Geo. 3. Sess. 1. c. 26)) for repairing the Road from the South End of Newton Abbott to the Passage Way in Kingswear, opposite Clifton, Dartmouth, Hardness, and other Roads therein mentioned, all in the County of Devon. (Repealed by Newton Abbott and Torquay Roads Act 1823 (4 Geo. 4. c. xvii))
Cranford Bridge and Maidenhead, Slough and Eton Roads Act 1809 (repealed)	49 Geo. 3. c. lvii	12 May 1809
An Act for continuing the Term and enlarging the Powers of several Acts (Note: Cranford to Maidenhead Road Act 1726 (13 Geo. 1. c. 31)) (Note: Maidenhead Road Act 1743 (17 Geo. 2. c. 19)) (Note: Bucks Roads Act 1766 (7 Geo. 3. c. 61)) (Note: Slough Roads Act 1796 (36 Geo. 3. c. 140)) passed for repairing the Road from Cranford Bridge, in the County of Middlesex, to that End of Maidenhead Bridge which lies in the County of Busks, and for amending the Road from Slough to a certain Place in Eton, and from Langley Broom to Datchett Bridge, in the County of Buckingham. (Repealed by Cranford Bridge and Maidenhead Bridge Road Act 1826 (7 Geo. 4. c. cxxxii))
Hounslow Heath and Egham Hill Road Act 1809 (repealed)	49 Geo. 3. c. lviii	12 May 1809
An Act for more effectually repairing the Road from the Powder Mills on Hounslow Heath, in the County of Middlesex, to the Twenty Mile Stone on Egham Hill, in the County of Surrey. (Repealed by Hounslow Heath and Egham Hill Road Act 1831 (1 Will. 4. c. v))
Londonderry School Act 1809 (repealed)	49 Geo. 3. c. lix	12 May 1809
An Act for vesting a Workhouse and Premises, situate in the City of Londonderry, in Trustees to be sold, and for applying the Purchase Money in building another School House, and for better regulating the same. (Repealed by Foyle College Act 1874 (37 & 38 Vict. c. 79))
Kelsal Inclosure Act 1809	49 Geo. 3. c. lx	12 May 1809
An Act for inclosing Lands in the Township of Kelsal, in the Parish of Tarvin, in the County Palatine of Chester.
Llan Trewyn, Bodlowydd, Bryn Cymme, and Llanelidan Inclosures Act 1809	49 Geo. 3. c. lxi	12 May 1809
An Act for inclosing Lands in the Townships of Llan Trerwyn, Bodlowydd, and Bryn-cymme, in the Manor of Llanelidan, in the Parish of Llanelidan, in the County of Denbigh.
Bradwell, Belton and Fritton Inclosures Act 1809	49 Geo. 3. c. lxii	12 May 1809
An Act for inclosing Lands in the Parishes of Bradwell, Belton, and Fritton, in the County of Suffolk.
Corton, Hopton and Gorleston Inclosures Act 1809	49 Geo. 3. c. lxiii	12 May 1809
An Act for inclosing Lands in the Parishes of Corton, Hopton, and Gorleston, in the County of Suffolk.
Great Witchingham Inclosure Act 1809	49 Geo. 3. c. lxiv	12 May 1809
An Act for inclosing Lands in the Parish of Great Witchingham, in the County of Norfolk.
Simonburn Inclosure Act 1809	49 Geo. 3. c. lxv	12 May 1809
An Act for inclosing Lands in the Parish of Simonburn, in the County oi Northumberland.
Elton and Winster Inclosures Act 1809	49 Geo. 3. c. lxvi	12 May 1809
An Act for inclosing Lands in the Townships of Elton and Winster, in the Parish of Youlgreave, in the County of Derby.
Barton-in-the-Clay Inclosure Act 1809	49 Geo. 3. c. lxvii	12 May 1809
An Act for inclosing Lands in the Parish of Barton-in-the-Clay, in the County of Bedford.
Allerston Inclosure Act 1809	49 Geo. 3. c. lxviii	12 May 1809
An At for inclosing Lands in the Manor and Township of Allerston, in the North Riding of the County of York.
Court of Chancery Act 1809 (repealed)	49 Geo. 3. c. lxix	20 May 1809
An Act for making Provision for such of the Sub-Registrars or Deputy Registrars of the High Court of Chancery as from Age or Infirmity shall be afflicted with permanent Disability, and be incapacitated for the due Execution of their Office; and for making further Provision for the Two Seniors of the said Registrars for the Clerks in the Registrar's Office, for the Master of the Report Office, and for providing additional Clerks in the Report Office of the said Court, and for making other Payments and Regulations in respect of the said Offices. (Repealed by Statute Law (Repeals) Act 2008 (c. 12))
London and Westminster Houses Lottery Act 1809 (repealed)	49 Geo. 3. c. lxx	20 May 1809
An Act to amend and enlarge the Powers of an Act, passed in the Forty-sixth Year of His present Majesty, (Note: City of London Lottery Act 1806 (46 Geo. 3. c. xcvii)) to enable the several Persons therein named to dispose of the several Houses therein mentioned in London and Westminster, by Lottery. (Repealed by Statute Law (Repeals) Act 2013 (c. 2))
Stainforth and Keadby Canal Navigation Act 1809	49 Geo. 3. c. lxxi	20 May 1809
An Act to enable the Company of Proprietors of the Stainforth and Keadby Canal Navigation to raise a further Sum of Money for the Discharge of their Debts, and to finish and complete the said Canal Navigation, and for amending the several Acts (Note: Stainforth and Keadby Canal Act 1793 (33 Geo. 3. c. 117)) (Note: Stainforth and Keadby Canal Act 1798 (38 Geo. 3. c. xlvii)) passed relative thereto.
Warwick and Napton Canal Act 1809	49 Geo. 3. c. lxxii	20 May 1809
An Act for amending, altering, and enlarging, the Powers of the several Acts (Note: Warwick and Napton Canal Act 1794 (34 Geo. 3. c. 38)) (Note: Warwick and Napton Canal Act 1796 (36 Geo. 3. c. 95)) relating to the Warwick and Napton Canal Navigation.
Trent and Mersey Canal Act 1809 (repealed)	49 Geo. 3. c. lxxiii	20 May 1809
An Act to amend and enlarge the Powers of the several Acts (Note: Trent and Mersey Canal Act 1766 (6 Geo. 3. c. 96)) (Note: Trent and Mersey Canal Act 1770 (10 Geo. 3. c. 102)) (Note: Trent and Mersey Canal Act 1775 (15 Geo. 3. c. 20)) (Note: Trent and Mersey Canal Act 1776 (16 Geo. 3. c. 32)) (Note: Trent and Mersey Canal Act 1783 (23 Geo. 3. c. 33)) (Note: Caldon Canal Act 1797 (37 Geo. 3. c. 36)) (Note: Trent and Mersey Canal Act 1797 (37 Geo. 3. c. 81)) (Note: Trent and Mersey Canal (Railways) Act 1802 (42 Geo. 3. c. xxv)) passed for making a navigable Canal from the Trent to the Mersey, and other Canals connected therewith. (Repealed by Trent and Mersey Canal Act 1831 (1 Will. 4. c. lv))
River Clyde Navigation Act 1809 (repealed)	49 Geo. 3. c. lxxiv	20 May 1809
An Act for explaining and amending Two Acts (Note: Clyde Bridge Act 1758 (32 Geo. 2. c. 62)) (Note: River Clyde Navigation Act 1770 (10 Geo. 3. c. 104)) for improving the Navigation of the River Clyde to the City of Glasgow. (Repealed by Clyde Navigation Consolidation Act 1858 (21 & 22 Vict. c. cxlix))
Lincolnshire Courthouse Act 1809 (repealed)	49 Geo. 3. c. lxxv	20 May 1809
An Act to enable the Justices of the Peace for the several Parts of Lindsey, Kesteven, and Holland, constituting the Three Divisions of the County of Lincoln, to provide a convenient House, with suitable Accommodations, for His Majesty's Judges at the Assizes for the said County. (Repealed by Statute Law (Repeals) Act 2013 (c. 2))
Kinsale Police, Harbour and Fisheries Act 1809	49 Geo. 3. c. lxxvi	20 May 1809
An Act for regulating the Police of the Town and Liberties of Kinsale, and for the Regulation and Improvement of the Port and Harbour of the said Town, and of the Fisheries thereof, and for other Purposes therein mentioned.
Southwold Harbour Act 1809 (repealed)	49 Geo. 3. c. lxxvii	20 May 1809
An Act to continue the Term, and render more effectual, several Acts (Note: Southwold Harbour Act 1746 (20 Geo. 2. c. 14)) (Note: Southwold Harbour Act 1757 (30 Geo. 2. c. 58)) (Note: Southwold Harbour Act 1789 (29 Geo. 3. c. 77)) passed for opening, cleansing, repairing, and improving the Harbour of Southwold, in the County of Suffolk. (Repealed by Southwold Harbour Act 1830 (11 Geo. 4 & 1 Will. 4. c. xlviii))
Wye and Lugg Navigation and Horse Towing-path Act 1809 (repealed)	49 Geo. 3. c. lxxviii	20 May 1809
An Act for amending several Acts (Note: Rivers Wye and Lugg Navigation Act 1662 (14 Cha. 2. c. 15 Pr.)) (Note: Rivers Wye and Lugg Navigation Act 1695 (7 & 8 Will. 3. c. 14)) (Note: Rivers Wye and Lugg Navigation Act 1726 (13 Geo. 1. c. 34)) for making navigable the Rivers Wye and Lugg, in the County of Hereford, and for making a Horse Towing Path on certain Parts of the Banks of the said River Wye. (Repealed by Gloucester Harbour Revision (Constitution) Order 2002 (SI 2002/3268))
Swansea Improvement Act 1809 (repealed)	49 Geo. 3. c. lxxix	20 May 1809
An Act for better paving, repairing, cleansing, lighting, and watching the several Streets, and other publick Passages and Places, within the Town and Franchise of Swansea, in the County of Glamorgan, and for removing and preventing Nuisances, Annoyances, and Obstructions therein. (Repealed by Swansea Improvement Act 1844 (7 & 8 Vict. c. cii))
Dublin Water Act 1809	49 Geo. 3. c. lxxx	20 May 1809
An Act for the better supplying the City of Dublin with Water.
Birmingham Prison and Public Offices Act 1809 (repealed)	49 Geo. 3. c. lxxxi	20 May 1809
An Act to authorize the raising of Money to defray the Expences of erecting a Prison and publick Offices in the Town of Birmingham in the County of Warwick. (Repealed by Local Government Board's Provisional Order Confirmation (No. 13) Act 1891 (54 & 55 Vict. c. clxi))
Temple Bar Improvement Act 1809	49 Geo. 3. c. lxxxii	20 May 1809
An Act to revive and continue the Term and Powers of certain Acts, (Note: Temple Bar, etc. Act 1795 (35 Geo. 3. c. 126)) (Note: Temple Bar Improvement Act 1798 (38 Geo. 3. c. lxi)) (Note: Temple Bar Improvement Act 1800 (39 & 40 Geo. 3. c. xlii)) (Note: Temple Bar Improvement Act 1802 (42 Geo. 3. c. lxxiii)) (Note: Temple Bar Improvement Act 1804 (44 Geo. 3. c. xxvii)) for widening and improving the Entrance into the City of London, near Temple Bar, for making a more commodious Street at Snow Hill, and for raising on the Credit of the Orphans' Fund certain Sums of Money for those Purposes.
Queensferry Ferry Improvement Act 1809	49 Geo. 3. c. lxxxiii	20 May 1809
An Act for the Improvement of the Passage across the Frith of Forth, called The Queensferry.
Taunton Bridges Act 1809	49 Geo. 3. c. lxxxiv	20 May 1809
An Act for building a new Bridge across the River Tone, and enlarging the Bridge at Shuttern, both in the Town of Taunton, in the County of Somerset, and also for widening and improving the Approaches to the said Bridges, and removing and preventing Obstructions and Nuisances thereon.
Norwich (Wensum) Bridge Act 1809 (repealed)	49 Geo. 3. c. lxxxv	20 May 1809
An Act for building a Bridge over the River Wensum, between the Scite where the Gates called King Street Gates formerly stood, and Carrow Abbey, to the Hamlet of Thorpe, in the County of the City of Norwich. (Repealed by Norwich City Council Act 1984 (c. xxiii))
Balby and Worksop Road Act 1809 (repealed)	49 Geo. 3. c. lxxxvi	20 May 1809
An Act to continue the Term, and enlarge the Powers of Two Acts of His present Majesty, (Note: Balby to Worksop Road Act 1765 (5 Geo. 3. c. 67)) (Note: Balby to Worksop Road Act 1787 (27 Geo. 3. c. 84)) for amending the Road from the Pinfold in Balby, in the County of York, to Worksop, in the County of Nottingham. (Repealed by Balby and Worksop Turnpike Road Act 1828 (9 Geo. 4. c. xlvi))
Nantgaredig, Llanllooney and Llansawell Road Act 1809 (repealed)	49 Geo. 3. c. lxxxvii	20 May 1809
An Act for making and maintaining a Road from a Place called Nantgaredig, adjoining the Turnpike Road leading from the Town of Llandilofawr to the Town of Carmarthen, through the Village of Brechfa to the River Tivy near Llanlooney Church, and also a Road from Brechfa aforesaid to the Village of Llansawell, all in the County of Carmarthen. (Repealed by Road from Nantgaredig and from Brechfâ Act 1830 (11 Geo. 4 & 1 Will. 4. c. xxvii))
Road from Congleton to Colley Bridge Act 1809 (repealed)	49 Geo. 3. c. lxxxviii	20 May 1809
An Act for continuing the Term, and enlarging the Powers of an Act of His present Majesty, (Note: Chester and Derby Roads Act 1789 (29 Geo. 3. c. 93)) for amending the Road leading from Congleton to Colley Bridge, and other Roads in the said Act mentioned, in the Counties of Chester and Derby. (Repealed by Road from Congleton to Thatchmarsh Bottom (Cheshire, Derbyshire) Act 1830 (11 Geo. 4 & 1 Will. 4. c. xxxii))
Malmesbury Turnpike Roads Act 1809 (repealed)	49 Geo. 3. c. lxxxix	20 May 1809
An Act for making and maintaining Turnpike Roads for the Town of Malmesbury, to or near to the Town of Wootton Bassett, Sutton Benger Church, and Dauntsey Gate, in the County of Wilts. (Repealed by Malmesbury Roads (Wiltshire) Act 1830 (11 Geo. 4 & 1 Will. 4. c. xix))
Wootton Bassett Road Act 1809 (repealed)	49 Geo. 3. c. xc	20 May 1809
An Act for repairing and maintaining the Road from Wotton Basset in the County of Wilts to the Two Mile Stone on the Turnpike Road from Swindon to Marlborough in the said County. (Repealed by Road from Wootton Bassett to the Swindon and Marlborough Road Act 1830 (11 Geo. 4 & 1 Will. 4. c. xxxvii))
Tonbridge and Ightham Road Act 1809 (repealed)	49 Geo. 3. c. xci	20 May 1809
An Act for amending and improving the Road from the North End of the Town of Tonbridge to the Village of Ightham, and Two other Roads communicating with the same, all in the County of Kent. (Repealed by Tonbridge and Ightham Road Act 1830 (11 Geo. 4 & 1 Will. 4. c. xcix))
Stockershead Road (Kent) Act 1809 (repealed)	49 Geo. 3. c. xcii	20 May 1809
An Act for amending and improving the Road from Stockershead at the Top of Charing Hill, to a certain Place where the same joins the Road from Ashford to Canterbury, all in the County of Kent. (Repealed by Stockershead and Bagham's Cross Road (Kent) Act 1829 (10 Geo. 4. c. xxiii))
Road to Chester and from Northwich to Tarvin Act 1809	49 Geo. 3. c. xciii	20 May 1809
An Act for continuing the Term and enlarging the Powers of Two Acts of His present Majesty, (Note: Stafford and Chester Roads Act 1769 (9 Geo. 3. c. 94)) (Note: Chester Roads Act 1788 (28 Geo. 3. c. 111)) for amending the Road from the End of the County of Stafford to the City of Chester, and from Northwich to Tarvin in the County of Chester, and other Roads in the said Acts mentioned, to far as respects the Third District of the said Roads.
Road over Horley Common Act 1809 (repealed)	49 Geo. 3. c. xciv	20 May 1809
An Act for making and maintaining a Road over Horley Common in the County of Surrey, to a Place called Black Corner, and from thence to join the Brighthelmston (Note: Brighthelmston is now known as Brighton.) Turnpike Road at Cuckfield, in the County of Sussex. (Repealed by Horley Common, Black Corner and Cuckfield Road Act 1831 (1 Will. 4. c.xlii))
Roads from Tunbridge Wells and from Florence Farm Act 1809 (repealed)	49 Geo. 3. c. xcv	20 May 1809
An Act for enlarging the Term and Powers of Two Acts of His present Majesty, (Note: Kent and Sussex Roads Act 1766 (6 Geo. 3. c. 56)) (Note: Kent and Sussex Roads Act 1788 (28 Geo. 3. c. 85)) for repairing the Road from Tunbridge Wells in the County of Kent, to the Cross Ways near Maresfield Street, and from Florence Farm to Forest Row, in the County of Sussex. (Repealed by Roads from Tunbridge Wells and from Florence Farm Act 1831 (1 Will. 4. c. lxx))
Road from Edenfield Chapel (Lancashire) Act 1809 (repealed)	49 Geo. 3. c. xcvi	20 May 1809
An Act to continue the Term and enlarge the Powers of an Act of the Thirty-seventh Year of His present Majesty, (Note: Bury and Bolton Roads Act 1797 (37 Geo. 3. c. 174)) for amending the Road from or near Edenfield Chapel to the Township of Little Bolton, and for making and maintaining a Road from the said Road at or near Booth Pits, to or near Bury Bridge, in the County Palatine of Lancaster. (Repealed by Road from Edenfield Chapel to Little Bolton (Lancashire) Act 1830 (11 Geo. 4 & 1 Will. 4. c. xxxi))
Road from Reading to Hatfield (Hertfordshire) Act 1809 (repealed)	49 Geo. 3. c. xcvii	20 May 1809
An Act to continue the Term, and enlarge the Powers of Two Acts of His present Majesty, (Note: Reading and Hatfield Road Act 1768 (8 Geo. 3. c. 50)) (Note: Berkshire Oxford Buckinghamshire and Hertford Roads Act 1787 (27 Geo. 3. c. 81)) for repairing the Road leading from Reading in the County of Berks, through Henley in the County of Oxford, and Great Marlow to Hatfield in the County of Hertford; and also the Road leading out of the said Road at Marlow over Great Marlow Bridge through Bysham to or near the Thirty Mile Stone in the Road leading from Maidenhead to Reading aforesaid. (Repealed by Road from Reading to Hatfield Act 1829 (10 Geo. 4. c. cxxxiii))
Norris' Estate Act 1809	49 Geo. 3. c. xcviii	20 May 1809
An Act for effecting the Sale of an Estate at Tachbrook in the County of Warwick, devised by the Will of John Norris Esquire, deceased; and for applying sufficient of the Money in discharging Incumbrances on certain Estates at Cwmyoy and Lanthony in the Counties of Monmouth and Hereford; and for paying the Residue thereof to Walter Salvage Lander Esquire; and for settling the said Estates at Cwmyoy and Lanthony to the Use of the Will of the said John Norris.
Middlehope Common Inclosure Act 1809	49 Geo. 3. c. xcix	20 May 1809
An Act for inclosing a Moor or Common called Middlebope within the Park and Forest of Weardale in the Parish of Stanhope, in the County of Durham.
Barford St. Martin, South Newton and Baverstock Allotments and Rights of Common Act 1809	49 Geo. 3. c. c	20 May 1809
An Act for dividing and allotting Lands in the Parishes of Barford Saint Martin and South Newton, and for extinguishing Rights of Common in other Lands in or adjoining the Parishes of Barford Saint Martin aforesaid, and Baverstock, in the County of Wilts.
Portbury Inclosure Act 1809	49 Geo. 3. c. ci	20 May 1809
An Act to explain and amend an Act passed in the Thirty-eighth Year of His present Majesty, (Note: Portbury Inclosure Act 1798 (38 Geo. 3. c. 32 Pr.)) for inclosing Lands in the Manor and Parish of Portbury, in the County of Somerset.
Cheadle Inclosure Act 1809	49 Geo. 3. c. cii	20 May 1809
An Act for inclosing Lands in the Parish of Cheadale, in the County of Stafford.
Liscard Inclosure Act 1809	49 Geo. 3. c. ciii	20 May 1809
An Act for inclosing Waste Lands in the Township of Liscard in the Parish of Wallasey, in the County Palatine of Chester.
Whiston Inclosure Act 1809	49 Geo. 3. c. civ	20 May 1809
An Act for inclosing Lands in the Manor of Whiston and Parish of Kingsley, in the County of Stafford.
Bledlow Inclosure Act 1809	49 Geo. 3. c. cv	20 May 1809
An Act for inclosing Lands in the Parish of Bledlow, in the County of Buckingham.
Idle Inclosure Act 1809	49 Geo. 3. c. cvi	20 May 1809
An Act for inclosing Lands within the Manor and Township of Idle, in the Parish of Calverley, in the West Riding of the County of York.
Marsworth Inclosure Act 1809	49 Geo. 3. c. cvii	20 May 1809
An Act for inclosing Lands in the Parish of Marsworth, in the County of Buckingham.
Long Wittenham Allotments Act 1809	49 Geo. 3. c. cviii	20 May 1809
An Act for inclosing Lands in the Manor and Parish of Long Wittenham, in the County of Berks.
Abdon and Stoke St. Milborough Inclosures Act 1809	49 Geo. 3. c. cix	20 May 1809
An Act for inclosing Lands in the Manors of Abdon and Stoke St. Milborough, in the County of Salop.
Stockton Inclosure Act 1809	49 Geo. 3. c. cx	20 May 1809
An Act for inclosing Lands in the Parish of Stockton, in the County of Wilts.
Kent County Rates Act 1809 (repealed)	49 Geo. 3. c. cxi	27 May 1809
An Act for repealing such Part of an Act passed in the Forty-third Year of His present Majesty, (Note: Kent Gaol and County Expenses Act 1803 (43 Geo. 3. c. lviii)) as imposes a certain Proportion of the County Rate for the County of Kent upon the Eastern Division of the said County, and certain Proportions upon the Western Division of the said County; and also so much of an Act passed in the Forty-seventh Year of His present Majesty, (Note: Kent County Rates, &c. Act 1807 (47 Geo. 3 Sess. 2. c. xxxiv)) for empowering the Justices of the Peace for the County of Kent, to make a fair and equal County Rate for the said County, as directs the Churchwardens and Overseers therein mentioned, to make certain Returns of the Rental or Value of Estates within their Parishes at the Periods and in the Manner therein mentioned, and imposes a certain Penalty upon such Churchwardens and Overseers for making Default therein, and for amending the Powers and Provisions of the said Acts. (Repealed by County of Kent Act 1981 (c. xviii))
Thames and Severn Canal Act 1809	49 Geo. 3. c. cxii	27 May 1809
An Act for altering, amending, and enlarging the Powers of several Acts for making and maintaining the Thames and Severn Canal Navigation.
St. Clement Danes Watching and Poor Relief Act 1809 (repealed)	49 Geo. 3. c. cxiii	27 May 1809
An Act for enlarging the Powers of Two Acts of His present Majesty, (Note: St. Clement Danes (Poor Relief, etc.) Act 1764 (4 Geo. 3. c. 55)) (Note: Westminster (Watching) Act 1774 (14 Geo. 3. c. 90)) sofar as relates to the establishing a Nightly Watch, and for maintaining the Poor within the Parish of Saint Clement Danes, in the County of Middlesex. (Repealed by London Government (City of Westminster) Order in Council 1901 (SR&O 1901/278))
Worthing Improvement Act 1809 (Note: The (long) titles of 49 Geo. 3. c. cxiv and 49 Geo. 3. c. cxv were erroneously transposed in both the original manuscript texts and the officially printed texts: the Worthing Improvement Act 1809 (49 Geo. 3. c. cxiv) was given the title of the Worthing Chapel of Ease Act 1809 (49 Geo. 3. c. cxv), and vice-versa.) or the Worthing Chapel of Ease Act 1809 (repealed)	49 Geo. 3. c. cxiv	27 May 1809
An Act for building a Chapel of Ease in the Town of Worthing, in the County of Sussex. (Repealed by Worthing Improvement Act 1821 (1 & 2 Geo. 4. c. lix))
Worthing Chapel of Ease Act 1809 or the Worthing Improvement Act 1809	49 Geo. 3. c. cxv	27 May 1809
An Act for amending an Act of the Forty-third Year of His present Majesty, (Note: Worthing Improvement Act 1803 (43 Geo. 3. c. lix)) for paving and improving the Town of Worthing, in the County of Sussex, and for building a Market House and establishing a Market in the said Town.
Gateshead Fell Church Act 1809	49 Geo. 3. c. cxvi	27 May 1809
An Act for building a Church on Gateshead Fell, in the Parish of Gateshead.
Margate Improvement and Harbour Act 1809 (repealed)	49 Geo. 3. c. cxvii	27 May 1809
An Act to amend and render more effectual Two Acts (Note: Margate Improvement Act 1787 (27 Geo. 3. c. 45)) (Note: Margate Pier Act 1799 (39 Geo. 3. c. ii)) for the Maintenance and Support of the Pier and Harbour, and paving and lighting the Town of Margate, in the County of Kent. (Repealed by County of Kent Act 1981 (c. xviii))
Portsmouth and Portsea Water Act 1809	49 Geo. 3. c. cxviii	27 May 1809
An Act for better supplying with Water the Borough of Portsmouth, and the Parishes of Portsmouth and Portsea, and Places adjacent, in the County of Southampton.
Sutton St. Edmunds Drainage Act 1809	49 Geo. 3. c. cxix	27 May 1809
An Act for effecting the Drainage and Improvement of the Lands and Grounds lying in the late Great Common in Sutton Saint Edmund's, within the Parish of Sutton Saint Mary, otherwise Long Sutton, in the County of Lincoln; and for authorizing the Drainage and Improvement of the Lands and Grounds lying in the late Little Common in Sutton Saint Edmund's aforesaid.
Friskney Inclosure and Drainage Act 1809	49 Geo. 3. c. cxx	27 May 1809
An Act for embanking, inclosing, and draining Lands within the Parish of Friskney, in the County of Lincoln.
Coalbrookdale and Shrewsbury Horse Towing-Path Act 1809	49 Geo. 3. c. cxxi	27 May 1809
An Act for making and keeping in Repair a Road or Passage for Horses on the Banks of the River Severn, between a certain Place at Coalbrooke Dale to and above the Welsh Bridge in the Town of Shrewsbury, in the County of Salop, for hauling and drawing Vessels along the said River.
Leeds Improvement Act 1809 (repealed)	49 Geo. 3. c. cxxii	27 May 1809
An Act to amend and enlarge the Powers of an Act passed in the Thirtieth Year of His present Majesty, (Note: Leeds Water Supply Act 1790 (30 Geo. 3. c. 68)) for better supplying the Town and Neighbourhood of Leeds, in the County of York, with Water, and for more effectually lighting and cleansing the Streets and other Places within the said Town and Neighbourhood, and for removing and preventing Nuisances and Annoyances therein; and for erecting a Court House and Prison for the Borough of Leeds, and for widening and improving the Streets and Passages in the said Town. (Repealed by West Yorkshire Act 1980 (c. xiv))
Globe Insurance Company Act 1809	49 Geo. 3. c. cxxiii	27 May 1809
An Act to alter and explain Two Acts (Note: Globe Insurance Company Act 1807 (47 Geo. 3 Sess. 1. c. xxx)) (Note: Globe Insurance Company (No. 2) Act 1807 (47 Geo. 3 Sess. 2. c. lxxxvii)) to enable the Globe Insurance Company to sue in the Name of their Treasurer, and to inrol Annuities.
Pelican Life Insurance Company Act 1809 (repealed)	49 Geo. 3. c. cxxiv	27 May 1809
An Act to alter and explain Two Acts (Note: Pelican Life Insurance Company Act 1807 (47 Geo. 3 Sess. 1. c. xxxiii)) (Note: Pelican Life Insurance Company (No. 2) Act 1807 (47 Geo. 3 Sess. 2. c. lxxxviii)) for enabling the Pelican Life Insurance Company to sue in the Name of their Secretary, and to inrol Annuities. (Repealed by Pelican Life Insurance Company's Act 1891 (54 & 55 Vict. c. lxxx))
Albion Fire and Life Insurance Company Act 1809	49 Geo. 3. c. cxxv	27 May 1809
An Act to alter and explain Two Acts (Note: Albion Fire and Life Insurance Company Act 1807 (47 Geo. 3 Sess. 1. c. xxxi)) (Note: Albion Fire and Life Insurance Company (No. 2) Act 1807 (47 Geo. 3 Sess. 2. c. lxxxvi)) for enabling the Albion Fire and Life Insurance Company to sue in the Name of their Secretary, and to inrol Annuities.
York Ouse and Foss Bridges Act 1809 (repealed)	49 Geo. 3. c. cxxvi	27 May 1809
An Act for widening and altering Ouse Bridge over the River Ouse, and Foss Bridge over the River Foss, in the City of York; for widening, raising, and improving certain Streets, Lanes, and Passages leading and near to the said Bridges; and for making certain other Improvements in the said City. (Repealed by York Corporation Act 1969 (c. xxxviii))
Ashburton Roads and Emmett Bridge Act 1809 (repealed)	49 Geo. 3. c. cxxvii	27 May 1809
An Act for consolidating and uniting the Powers of several Acts (Note: Devon Roads Act 1755 (28 Geo. 2. c. 49)) (Note: Devon Roads Act 1760 (1 Geo. 3. c. 34)) (Note: Ashburton Roads Act 1776 (16 Geo. 3. c. 79)) (Note: Devon Roads Act 1802 (42 Geo. 3. c. lxxv)) (Note: Totnes Roads Act 1763 (3 Geo. 3. c. 38)) (Note: Totnes Roads Act 1784 (24 Geo. 3. Sess. 2. c. 64)) (Note: Totnes and Ashburton Roads and Emmett Bridge over River Dart Act 1805 (45 Geo. 3. c. lxxv)) passed for amending several Roads near the Borough of Ashburton and the Town of Newton Bushell, and from or near the North Side of the Town of Totness towards Ashburton aforesaid, for building a Bridge across the River Dart, at or near a Place called Emmett, in the County of Devon, and for amending and improving the said several Roads. (Repealed by Ashburton and Totnes Roads Act 1830 (11 Geo. 4 & 1 Will. 4. c. xcviii))
Southwark and Dartford Roads Act 1809 (repealed)	49 Geo. 3. c. cxxviii	27 May 1809
An Act for continuing, explaining, and amending an Act passed in the Forty-second Year of His present Majesty, (Note: Roads in Kent and Surrey Act 1802 (42 Geo. 3. c. lxiii)) for repairing and improving the Roads leading from the Stones End in Kent Street, in the Parish of Saint George Southwark, to Dartford, and other Roads therein mentioned, in the Counties of Kent and Surrey. (Repealed by New Cross Turnpike Roads Act 1826 (7 Geo. 4. c. cxxv))
Bettws-Abergele Inclosure Act 1809	49 Geo. 3. c. cxxix	27 May 1809
An Act for inclosing Lands in the Parish of Bettws-Abergele, in the County of Denbigh.
Caerwys Inclosure Act 1809	49 Geo. 3. c. cxxx	27 May 1809
An Act for inclosing Lands in the Parish of Caerwys, in the County of Flint.
Eaton Inclosure Act 1809	49 Geo. 3. c. cxxxi	27 May 1809
An Act for inclosing Lands in the Parish of Eaton, in the County of Nottingham.
Woodstone Inclosure Act 1809	49 Geo. 3. c. cxxxii	27 May 1809
An Act for inclosing Lands in the Parish of Woodstone, in the County of Huntingdon.
King's Cliffe Inclosure Act 1809	49 Geo. 3. c. cxxxiii	27 May 1809
An Act for inclosing Lands in the Parish of King's Cliffe, in the County of Northampton.
Cadeby and Sprotbrough Inclosures Act 1809	49 Geo. 3. c. cxxxiv	27 May 1809
An Act for inclosing Lands in the Township of Cadeby and Parish of Sprotbrough, in the County of York.
Gateshead Inclosure Act 1809	49 Geo. 3. c. cxxxv	27 May 1809
An Act for inclosing Lands in the Parish of Gateshead, in the County of Durham.
Glatton-with-Holme Inclosure Act 1809	49 Geo. 3. c. cxxxvi	27 May 1809
An Act for inclosing Lands in the Parish of Glatton-with-Holme in the County of Huntingdon.
Estate of the See of Winchester Act 1809	49 Geo. 3. c. cxxxvii	3 June 1809
An Act for the Application of the Purchase Money of certain Lands, taken from the Possessions of the See of Winchester, under the Provisions of an Act of the Forty-sixth Year of His present Majesty, intituled, "An Act for vesting certain Messuages, Lands, Tenements, and Hereditaments in Trustees, for better securing His Majesty's Docks, Ships and Stores at Portsmouth, and for extending the Works and Lines at Dover." (Note: Fortifications (Portsmouth and Dover) Act 1806 (46 Geo. 3. c. 105))
Kennet and Avon Canal Act 1809	49 Geo. 3. c. cxxxviii	3 June 1809
An Act for enabling the Kennet and Avon Canal Company to raise a sufficient Sum of Money to complete the said Canal, and for amending the several Acts for making the same.
Durham County Gaol, House of Correction and Courts of Justice Act 1809 (repealed)	49 Geo. 3. c. cxxxix	3 June 1809
An Act for erecting a new Gaol and House of Correction and new Courts of Justice, in and for the County Palatine of Durham, and purchasing proper Scites for the same; and for disposing of the old Gaol and House of Correction and Courts of Justice there; and making an equal County Rate for those Purposes. (Repealed by Durham City Council Act 1985 (c. xxix))
Oswestry Improvement Act 1809 (repealed)	49 Geo. 3. c. cxl	3 June 1809
An Act for paving, cleansing, lighting, watching, and otherwise improving the Streets and other Publick Passages and Places in the Town and Borough of Oswestry, in the County of Salop. (Repealed by Local Government Supplemental Act 1864 (27 & 28 Vict. c. 26))
Glamorgan, Brecon and Monmouth Court of Requests Act 1809 (repealed)	49 Geo. 3. c. cxli	3 June 1809
An Act for the more easy and speedy Recovery of Small Debts within the Parish of Merthyr Tidfil, and other Places therein mentioned, in the Counties of Glamorgan, Brecon and Monmouth. (Repealed by Glamorgan, Brecon and Monmouth Court of Requests Act 1809 Repeal Act 1834 (4 & 5 Will. 4. c. xl))
Vauxhall Bridge Act 1809 (repealed)	49 Geo. 3. c. cxlii	3 June 1809
An Act for building a Bridge across the River Thames, from or near Vauxhall Turnpike, in the Parish of Saint Mary Lambeth, in the County of Surrey, to the opposite Shore, in the Parish of Saint John, in the City and Liberty of Westminster, and County of Middlesex, and for making convenient Roads thereto. (Repealed by Local Law (Greater London Council and Inner London Boroughs) Order 1965 (SI 1965/540))
Wallingford Bridge and Approaches Act 1809	49 Geo. 3. c. cxliii	3 June 1809
An Act for taking down and re-building the Whole or Part of a certain Bridge called Wallingford Bridge, in the Borough of Wallingford, in the County of Berks, and for opening, widening, and improving the Avenues or Approaches to the said Bridge.
Newport Pagnell North and Tickford Bridges and Approaches Act 1809	49 Geo. 3. c. cxliv	3 June 1809
An Act for taking down and re-building certain Parts of North Bridge and Tickford Bridge, in the Parishes of Newport Pagnell and Lathbury, in the County of Buckingham, and for widening and making more commodious the laid Bridges, and the Approaches thereto.
Road to Abbott's Bromley Act 1809	49 Geo. 3. c. cxlv	3 June 1809
An Act for repairing and maintaining the Road from Burton upon Trent, in the County of Stafford, to Abbots Bromley, and from Bagots Bromley to the present Turnpike Road at or near Shirley Wich, in the said County.
Road from Carmarthen to Lampeterpontstephen (Cardigan and Carmarthen) Act 1809	49 Geo. 3. c. cxlvi	3 June 1809
An Act for enlarging the Term and Powers of an Act of His present Majesty, for repairing the Road from Carmarthen to Lampeter-pont-stephen in the County of Cardigan, and other Roads in the said Act mentioned, so far as the same relate to the Carmarthen District of Roads, and for conssolidating in the same Act and Trust certain other Roads in the said County of Carmarthen. (Note: Carmarthen Roads Act 1788 (28 Geo. 3. c. 109))
Road from Handsworth to Hamstead Bridge (Staffordshire) Act 1809	49 Geo. 3. c. cxlvii	3 June 1809
An Act for making and repairing a Road from Soho Hill, in the Parish of Handsworth, to the Walsall Turnpike Road, on the Northern Side of Hamstead Bridge; and also another Road from Brown's Green to a House called The Friary, all in the County of Stafford.
Foote's Estate Act 1809	49 Geo. 3. c. cxlviii	3 June 1809
An Act for vesting the settled and other Estates of John Pierson Foote Esquire, in the Parish of Calstock, in the County of Cornwall, in Trustees upon trust, to sell and to stand possessed of the Money arising from the Sale thereof, upon the Trusts therein mentioned.
Allhallows Barking Parish Estate Act 1809	49 Geo. 3. c. cxlix	3 June 1809
An Act for enabling the Minister and Churchwardens of the Parish of Allhallows Barking, in the City of London, to grant a Lease of certain Estates belonging to the same Parish, pursuant to an Agreement entered into for that Purpose.
Wheatley Inclosure Act 1809	49 Geo. 3. c. cl	3 June 1809
An Act for inclosing Lands in the Hamlet and Chapelry of Wheatley, in the Parish of Cuddesden, in the County of Oxford.
Hayes Inclosure Act 1809	49 Geo. 3. c. cli	3 June 1809
An Act for inclosing Lands in the Parish of Hayes, in the County of Middlesex, and for extinguishing the Tithes in the said Parish.
Maxey with Deepingate, Northborough, Glinton with Peakirk, Etton, and Helpstone Inclosures Act 1809	49 Geo. 3. c. clii	3 June 1809
An Act for inclosing Lands in the Parishes of Maxey with Deepingate, Northborough, Glinton with Peakirk, Etton, and Helpstone, in the County of Northampton.
Shobdon, Aymestrey and Lingen Inclosures Act 1809	49 Geo. 3. c. cliii	3 June 1809
An Act for inclosing Lands in the Parishes of Shobdon, Aymestrey, and Lingen, in the County of Hereford, and for extinguishing Tithes in those Parishes.
Goring Inclosures Act 1809	49 Geo. 3. c. cliv	3 June 1809
An Act for inclosing Goring Common, or Goring Heath, and certain Waste Lands, in the Parish of Goring, in the County of Oxford.
Thames Lastage and Ballastage Act 1809 (repealed)	49 Geo. 3. c. clv	10 June 1809
An At for continuing the Term of, and altering and amending an Act, passed in the Forty-fifth Year of His present Majesty, (Note: Thames Lastage and Ballastage Act 1805 (45 Geo. 3. c. xcviii)) for repealing two Acts (Note: River Thames (Lastage and Ballastage) Act 1732 (6 Geo. 3. c. 29)) (Note: Thames, etc. Act 1758 (32 Geo. 2. c. 16)) of His late Majesty, for the Regulation of Lastage and Ballastage in the River Thames, and to make more effectual Regulations relating thereto. (Repealed by Thames Lastage and Ballastage Act 1843 (6 & 7 Vict. c. lvii))
London Dock Company Act 1809 (repealed)	49 Geo. 3. c. clvi	10 June 1809
An Act to alter and amend several Acts passed in the Fortieth, (Note: Port of London Improvement Act 1800 (39 & 40 Geo. 3. c. xlvii)) Forty-fourth, (Note: Port of London Improvement Act 1804 (44 Geo. 3. c. ii)) (Note: London Docks (Warehousing of Goods) Act 1804 (44 Geo. 3. c. 100)) Forty-fifth, (Note: Port of London Improvement Act 1805 (45 Geo. 3. c. lviii)) Forty-sixth, (Note: Port of London Improvement and London Dock Company Act 1806 (46 Geo. 3. c. lix)) and Forty-seventh (Note: London Dock Company Act 1807 (47 Geo. 3 Sess. 2. c. v)) Years of His present Majesty, for making Wet Docks, Basons, Cuts, and other Works, for the greater Accommodation and Security of Shipping, Commerce, and Revenue, within the Port of London, and for other the Purposes therein mentioned relating thereto, and to enlarge the Powers and Authorities by the said Acts granted to the London Dock Company. (Repealed by London Docks Act 1828 (9 Geo. 4. c. cxvi))
Chelsea Waterworks Act 1809 or the Westminster Water Act 1809 (repealed)	49 Geo. 3. c. clvii	10 June 1809
An Act for amending an Act, (Note: Chelsea Waterworks Act 1721 (8 Geo. 1. c. 26)) for better supplying the City and Liberties of Westminster, and Parts adjacent, with Water, and for enlarging the Powers thereof. (Repealed by Chelsea Waterworks Act 1852 (15 & 16 Vict. c. clvi))
Bullo Pill Railway Act 1809	49 Geo. 3. c. clviii	10 June 1809
An Act for making and maintaining a Railway or Tram Road from the Summit of the Hill above Churchway Engine, in the Forest of Dean in the County of Gloucester, to a certain Place in the said Forest called Cinderford Bridge.
Lydney and Lidbrook Railway Act 1809	49 Geo. 3. c. clix	10 June 1809
An Act for making and maintaining a Railway from the River Wye, at or near to a Place called Lidbrook, in the Parish of Ruardean, in the County of Gloucester, to or near to a Place called the Lower Forge, below Newern, in the Parish of Lydney, in the said County, and for making other Railways therein mentioned in the Forest of Dean, in the County of Gloucester.
Dumfriesshire Roads Act 1809 (repealed)	49 Geo. 3. c. clx	10 June 1809
An Act to continue and amend several Acts (Note: Dumfriesshire Roads Act 1798 (38 Geo. 3. c. ix)) (Note: Roads in Dumfries and Kirkcudbright Act 1801 (41 Geo. 3. (U.K.) c. xlix)) for repairing Roads in the County of Dumfries, and converting the Statute Labour within the said County into Money. (Repealed by Roads in Dumfries Act 1819 (59 Geo. 3. c. cx))
Roads from Mead Brook (Gloucestershire) to Christian Malford Bridge (Wiltshire) Act 1809 (repealed)	49 Geo. 3. c. clxi	10 June 1809
An Act for enlarging the Term and Powers of several Acts of His late and present Majesty, (Note: Gloucester and Wiltshire Roads Act 1756 (29 Geo. 2. c. 56)) (Note: Gloucester and Wilts Roads Act 1762 (2 Geo. 3. c. 74)) (Note: Gloucester Roads Act 1787 (27 Geo. 3. c. 68)) for repairing the Roads from Mead Brook, in the County of Gloucester, to Christian Malford Bridge, in the County of Wilts, and other Places therein mentioned, and for extending the said Road to the Centre of Christian Malford Bridge. (Repealed by Draycott or Upper District Turnpike Road Act 1831 (1 Will. 4. c. lxiii))
Earl of Guilford's Estate Act 1809	49 Geo. 3. c. clxii	10 June 1809
An Act for the Exchange of Part of the Settled Estates of the Earl of Guilford, and for the Sale of other Part, to discharge a Mortgage thereon, and for other Purposes.
Wharton's Estate Act 1809	49 Geo. 3. c. clxiii	10 June 1809
An Act for the Partition of certain Settled Estates of John Wharton Esquire, situate in the Counties of York, Westmorland, and Durham.
Hutton's Estate Act 1809	49 Geo. 3. c. clxiv	10 June 1809
An Act for vesting certain Estates in the Counties of Kent and Sussex, devised by the Will of John Hutton Esquire, deceased, in Trustees to be sold, and for investing the Money arising therefrom in the Purchase of other Estates to be settled to the same Uses.
Morin's Estate Act 1809	49 Geo. 3. c. clxv	10 June 1809
An Act for vesting Part of the devised Estates of John Tirel Morin Esquire, deceased, situate in the Counties of Buckingham and Middlesex, in Trustees to be sold, for discharging Incumbrances affecting the same, and for laying out the Residue of the Monies to arise by such Sale in the Purchase of other Estates to be settled to the same Uses as the Estates intended to be sold.
Farrer's Estate Act 1809	49 Geo. 3. c. clxvi	10 June 1809
An Act for vesting the detached Parts of the Estates of William Farrer Esquire, deceased, in Trustees for Sale, under the Direction of the Court of Chancery, for paying the Incumbrances affecting the same.
Massingberd's Estate Act 1809	49 Geo. 3. c. clxvii	10 June 1809
An Act for vesting Part of the Real Estates, in the County of Lincoln, devised by the Will of Henry Massingberd Esquire, deceased, in Trustees to be sold, and for applying Part of the Purchase Money in paying off certain Incumbrances affecting the said Estates, and for laying out the Residue thereof in the Purchase of other Estates to be settled to the same Uses.
Jocelyn's Estate Act 1809	49 Geo. 3. c. clxviii	10 June 1809
An Act for vesting certain Estates late of the Honourable George Jocelyn deceased, in the County of Dublin, in Trustees to be sold, and for laying out the Monies thence arising in the Purchase of Government Securities, to be settled to the same Uses as the Estates sold.
Boxmoor Act 1809 or the Boxmoor Inclosure Act 1809	49 Geo. 3. c. clxix	10 June 1809
An Act for vesting in Trustees a certain Tract of Open Pasture Land called Box Moor, in the Parish of Hemel-hempsted, in the County of Hertford, upon certain Trusts, applying the Produce thereof, and for better securing the Rights of the respective Parties entitled to the said Moor.
Dronfield Inclosure Act 1809	49 Geo. 3. c. clxx	10 June 1809
An Act for inclosing Lands in the Parish of Dronfield, in the County of Derby.
Blackfriars Bridge Act 1809	49 Geo. 3. c. clxxi	15 June 1809
An Act for reviving, continuing, and amending an Act passed in the Twenty-sixth Year of His present Majesty, (Note: Blackfriars Bridge (Sunday Tolls) Act 1786 (26 Geo. 3. c. 37)) for laying a Toll upon all Horses and Carriages passing on a Sunday over Blackfriars Bridge, and for applying the Money to arise thereby towards increasing the Fund for watching, lighting, cleansing, watering, and repairing the said Bridge.
Roads to the West India Docks Act 1809 (repealed)	49 Geo. 3. c. clxxii	15 June 1809
An Act for altering and enlarging the Term and Powers of Three Acts, made in the Forty-second, (Note: Roads from West India Docks Act 1802 (42 Geo. 3. c. ci)) Forty-fourth, (Note: West India Docks, Cannon Street and East India Docks Roads Act 1804 (44 Geo. 3. c. xxxvii)) and Forty-sixth (Note: Roads to the West and East India Docks Act 1806 (46 Geo. 3. c. cxxv)) Years of the Reign of His present Majesty, for making, maintaining, watching, lighting, and watering several Roads to communicate with the West India Docks, in the Isle of Dogs, and the East India Docks at Blackwall, both in the County of Middlesex; and also of several Acts for repairing the Cannon Street Road, in the said County; and also for making, maintaining, watching, lighting, and watering a new Road from the said Road communicating with the East India Docks, to Barking, in the County of Essex; and for enlarging the Powers of an Act passed in the Forty-eighth Year of the Reign of His present Majesty, (Note: Tilbury Fort Road Act 1808 (48 Geo. 3. c. xcii)) for making and maintaining a Road from the Romford and Whitechapel Road to or near to Tilbury Fort, in the County of Essex. (Repealed by Commercial and East India and Barking Roads Act 1828 (9 Geo. 4. c. cxii))
Roads leading to Dartford Act 1809 (repealed)	49 Geo. 3. c. clxxiii	15 June 1809
An Act for continuing the Term and enlarging the Powers of Two Acts of the Sixth (Note: Dartford Roads Act 1766 (6 Geo. 3. c. 98)) and Twenty-eighth (Note: Dartford Roads Act 1788 (28 Geo. 3. c. 84)) Years of His present Majesty, for repairing several Roads leading to the Town of Dartford, in the County of Kent. (Repealed by Roads from Dartford to Sevenoaks Act 1831 (1 Will. 4. c. viii))
Duke of Norfolk's Estate Act 1809	49 Geo. 3. c. clxxiv	15 June 1809
An Act for extending and enlarging the Powers or Authorities given by an Act passed in the Thirty-seventh Year of the Reign of His present Majesty, (Note: Arundel Manor Act 1797 (37 Geo. 3. c. 40 Pr.)) intituled, "An Act for the Enfranchisement of Copyhold and Customary Lands, Parcel of the Manor of Arundel, and other Manors entailed by the Act of Parliament of the Third of Charles the First, (Note: Earl of Arundel's Dignity and Estate Act 1627 (3 Cha. 1. c. 4 Pr.)) and for the Sale of Tithes also entailed by the said Act."
Lord Thurlow's Estate Act 1809	49 Geo. 3. c. clxxv	15 June 1809
An Act to empower the Trustees under the Will of the Right Honourable Edward late Lord Thurlow to grant in Fee upon Fee Farm Rents, or for long Terms of Years, certain Estates by the same Will devised in Trust for Sales and to pull down the Mansion House called Knight's Hill, and to make Roads, and to enfranchise Copyholds, and for other Purposes.
Lord Le Despencer's Estate Act 1809	49 Geo. 3. c. clxxvi	15 June 1809
An Act for vesting an Estate in the County of Lincoln, devised by the Will of Francis Lord Le Despencer, in Trustees, upon Trust, to sell the same, and with the Money arising therefrom to discharge the Incumbrances thereupon, and to lay out the Surplus in the Purchase of other Estates to be settled to the same Uses.
Partridge's Estate Act 1809	49 Geo. 3. c. clxxvii	15 June 1809
An Act for effecting the Sale of certain Estates devised by the Will of Henry Partridge Esquire, deceased, and for laying out the Money to arise by such Sales in the Purchase of other Estates, and for settling the same to the like Uses.
Lord Craven's Estate Act 1809	49 Geo. 3. c. clxxviii	15 June 1809
An Act for vesting certain detached Parts of the Estates devised or limited to strict Uses by the Will of the Right Honourable William late Lord Craven deceased, and situate in the County of Gloucester, in Trustees, to be sold, and for applying Part of the Monies arising from the Sale thereof, in discharge of an Incumbrance subsisting thereon, and for laying out the Residue of such Monies in the Purchase of other Estates to be settled to the same Uses.
Hodgkin's Estate Act 1809	49 Geo. 3. c. clxxix	15 June 1809
An Act for vesting certain Estates, late of Thomas Hodgkins Esquire, lying in the respective Parishes of Walsall and Aldridge, in the County of Stafford, in Trustees, in trust to sell the same, and apply the Purchase Monies arising therefrom in paying off all Incumbrances upon such Estates, and otherwise under the Directions of the High Court of Chancery.
Sharnbrook Inclosure Act 1809	49 Geo. 3. c. clxxx	15 June 1809
An Act for inclosing Lands in the Parish of Sharnbrook, in the County of Bedford.
Wilshamstead Inclosure Act 1809	49 Geo. 3. c. clxxxi	15 June 1809
An Act for inclosing Lands in the Parish of Wilshamstead, in the County of Bedford.
Royal Exchange Insurance Company of Ireland Act 1809	49 Geo. 3. c. clxxxii	19 June 1809
An Act to enable the Royal Exchange Insurance Company of Ireland to sue and be sued io the Name of their Secretary.
Surrey and Kent Sewers Act 1809	49 Geo. 3. c. clxxxiii	19 June 1809
An Act for making new Sewers and Drains and amending the present Sewers and Drains within certain Districts under the Jurisdiction of the Commissioners of Sewers for the Limits extending from East Mouldsey in Surrey, to Ravensborne in Kent, and for other Purposes relating to the Execution of the Commission of Sewers for the said Limits.
St. Mary Magdalen Bermondsey Poor Relief and Churchyard Act 1809 (repealed)	49 Geo. 3. c. clxxxiv	19 June 1809
An Act for rendering more effectual Two Acts (Note: Bermondsey (Poor Relief) Act 1757 (31 Geo. 2. c. 45)) (Note: Bermondsey Poor Relief Act 1791 (31 Geo. 3. c. 19)) passed for the better regulating the Poor in the Parish of Saint Mary Magdalen, Bermondsey, in the County of Surrey; for inclosing the Church Yard thereof, and for other Purposes therein mentioned relating thereto. (Repealed by London Government (Borough of Bermondsey) Order in Council 1901 (SR&O 1901/264))
Northumberland Gaol and Courts of Justice Act 1809 (repealed)	49 Geo. 3. c. clxxxv	19 June 1809
An Act to enable His Majesty to grant the Moot Hall, Grand Jury Room, and certain Grounds and Buildings adjoining thereto in the Castle Garth, within the Scite of the Old Castle of Newcastle-upon-Tyne, to the Justices of the Peace for the County of Northumberland, for building Courts of Justice, and also a Gaol for the said County, and for other Purposes therein mentioned relating thereto. (Repealed by Statute Law (Repeals) Act 2013 (c. 2))
Road from Southwark to the Kent Road Act 1809 (repealed)	49 Geo. 3. c. clxxxvi	19 June 1809
An Act for making and maintaining a Road from the Borough of Southwark to the Kent Road in the County of Surrey. (Repealed by Road from Southwark to the Kent Road Act 1829 (10 Geo. 4. c. cxiii))
Minera Inclosure Act 1809	49 Geo. 3. c. clxxxvii	19 June 1809
An An to repeal so much of an Act passed in the Forty-eighth Year of His present Majesty, (Note: Minera Inclosure Act 1808 (48 Geo. 3. c. xvi)) for inclosing Wastes in the Township of Minera in the County of Denbigh, as subjects the Owners of certain Mines there to Damages for working the same, and as authorizes any Person to get Stone from any Mines of Stone in the said Wastes.
Barmouth and Traethmawr Road and Traethback Bridge Act 1809	49 Geo. 3. c. clxxxviii	20 June 1809
An Act for making and maintaining a Road leading from Barmouth in the County of Merioneth, to Traethmawr in the County of Caernarvon, and for building a Bridge at Traethbach, in the said County of Merioneth.
Kent Waterworks Act 1809	49 Geo. 3. c. clxxxix	20 June 1809
An Act for supplying with Water the Inhabitants of Deptford, Greenwich, and several other Parishes and Places in the Counties of Kent and Surrey.
Portsmouth and Isle of Wight Watermen Act 1809	49 Geo. 3. c. cxc	20 June 1809
An Act for the better Government of the Watermen working on the Passage between Gosport, Portsmouth, and Portsea, and other Places within Portsmouth Harbour, and to and from Spithead, St. Helen's, and other Parts within the Isle of Wight, in the County of Southampton, and to and from certain Places in the said Island, and for regulating the Fares of such Watermen.
Strand Bridge Act 1809 (repealed)	49 Geo. 3. c. cxci	20 June 1809
An Act for building a Bridge over the River Thames from the Precinct of the Savoy, or near thereunto, in the County of Middlesex, to the opposite Shore, and for making, convenient Roads and Avenues to communicate therewith, in the County of Surrey. (Repealed by Local Law (Greater London Council and Inner London Boroughs) Order 1965 (SI 1965/540))
Manchester and Salford Water Act 1809	49 Geo. 3. c. cxcii	20 June 1809
An Act for more effectually supplying with Water the Inhabitants of the Towns of Manchester and Salford, in the Parish of Manchester in the County Palatine of Lancaster.

=== Private acts ===
Short title	Citation	Royal assent
Long title
Lord Boringdon's Divorce Act 1809	49 Geo. 3. c. 1 Pr.	14 February 1809
An Act to dissolve the Marriage of the Right Honourable John Lord Boringdon with the Right Honourable Augusta Lady Boringdon his now Wife, and to enable him to marry again, and for other Purposes therein mentioned.
Langley Marish Inclosure Act 1809	49 Geo. 3. c. 2 Pr.	13 March 1809
An Act for inclosing Lands in the Parish of Langley Marish, in the County of Buckingham.
Hursley and Merdon Inclosure Act 1809	49 Geo. 3. c. 3 Pr.	13 March 1809
An Act for inclosing Lands in the Parish of Hursley and the Manor of Murdon, in the County of Southampton.
Denshaw Moor Inclosure Act 1809	49 Geo. 3. c. 4 Pr.	13 March 1809
An Act for inclosing Denshaw Moor, in the Township of Quick within Saddleworth, in the West Riding of the County of York.
Gregson's Divorce Act 1809	49 Geo. 3. c. 5 Pr.	13 March 1809
An Act to dissolve the Marriage of Jeffe Gregson Esquire, with Grace Close his now Wife, and to enable him to marry again, and for other Purposes therein mentioned.
Bazett's Divorce Act 1809	49 Geo. 3. c. 6 Pr.	13 March 1809
An Act to dissolve the Marriage of Richard Campbell Bazett with Margaret Ann Bazett his now Wife, and to enable him to marry again, and for other Purposes therein mentioned.
Dettmar's Naturalization Act 1809	49 Geo. 3. c. 7 Pr.	20 March 1809
An Act for naturalizing George Dettmar.
Barton Turf Inclosure Act 1809	49 Geo. 3. c. 8 Pr.	24 March 1809
An Act for inclosing Lands in the Parish of Barton Turf, in the County of Norfolk.
Sartoris' Naturalization Act 1809	49 Geo. 3. c. 9 Pr.	24 March 1809
An Act for naturalizing Peter Urbanis Sartoris.
Ackermann's Naturalization Act 1809	49 Geo. 3. c. 10 Pr.	24 March 1809
An Act for naturalizing Rudolph Ackermann.
Orcheston St. George Inclosure Act 1809	49 Geo. 3. c. 11 Pr.	30 March 1809
An Act for inclosing Lands in the several Tithings of Orcheston Saint George and Elston, in the Parish of Orcheston Saint George, in the County of Wilts.
Grûttner's Naturalization Act 1809	49 Geo. 3. c. 12 Pr.	30 March 1809
An Act for naturalizing Samuel Traugott Grûttner.
Dean Inclosure Act 1809	49 Geo. 3. c. 13 Pr.	28 April 1809
An Act for inclosing Lands in the Parish of Dean, in the County of Cumberland.
Congresbury Inclosure Act 1809	49 Geo. 3. c. 14 Pr.	28 April 1809
An Act for dividing, allotting, and inclosing the Open and Commonable Lands in the Parishes of Congresbury, Weck Saint Lawrence, and Puxton in the County of Somerset.
Rothersthorpe Inclosure Act 1809	49 Geo. 3. c. 15 Pr.	28 April 1809
An Act for inclosing Lands in the Parish of Rothersthorpe, in the County of Northampton.
Llansadwrn Inclosure Act 1809	49 Geo. 3. c. 16 Pr.	28 April 1809
An Act for inclosing Lands in the several Parishes of Llansadwrn, Llandilovawr, and Cayo, in the County of Carmarthen.
Ashford Inclosure Act 1809	49 Geo. 3. c. 17 Pr.	28 April 1809
An Act for inclosing Lands in the Parish of Echelford, otherwise Ashford, in the County of Middlesex.
Croxton Allotments Act 1809	49 Geo. 3. c. 18 Pr.	28 April 1809
An Act for allotting Lands in the Parish of Croxton, in the County of Lincoln.
Sheringham Inclosure Act 1809	49 Geo. 3. c. 19 Pr.	28 April 1809
An Act for inclosing Lands in the Parish of Sherringham, in the County of Norfolk.
Cudworth Inclosure Act 1809	49 Geo. 3. c. 20 Pr.	28 April 1809
An Act for enclosing Lands in the Township of Cudworth, in the Parish of Royston, in the West Riding of the County of York.
Purston Jackling Inclosure Act 1809	49 Geo. 3. c. 21 Pr.	28 April 1809
An Act for inclosing Lands in the Township of Purston Jackling, in the West Riding of the County of York/
Woolridge Inclosure Act 1809	49 Geo. 3. c. 22 Pr.	28 April 1809
An Act for inclosing a Tract of Land called Woolridge, in the Parishes of Saint Mary de Lode, or Hartpury, in the County of Gloucester.
Dry Drayton Inclosure Act 1809	49 Geo. 3. c. 23 Pr.	28 April 1809
An Act for inclosing Lands in the Parish of Dry Drayton, in the County of Cambridge.
Brograve's Divorce Act 1809	49 Geo. 3. c. 24 Pr.	28 April 1809
An Act to dissolve the Marriage of Sir George Berney Brograve Baronet, with Emma Louisa Brograve his now Wife, and to enable him to marry again, and for other Purposes therein mentioned.
Campbell's Divorce Act 1809	49 Geo. 3. c. 25 Pr.	28 April 1809
An Act to dissolve the Marriage of Peter Campbell Junior, Esquire, with Elizabeth Lewis Woollery his now Wife, and to enable him to marry again, and for other Purposes therein mentioned.
Moens' Naturalization Act 1809	49 Geo. 3. c. 26 Pr.	28 April 1809
An Act for naturalizing Adrian Moens.
Kahle's Naturalization Act 1809	49 Geo. 3. c. 27 Pr.	28 April 1809
An Act for naturalizing Christian Frederick Kahle.
Duchess of Chandos' Estate Act 1809	49 Geo. 3. c. 28 Pr.	12 May 1809
An Act for enabling the most Noble Elizabeth Duchess Dowager of Chandos and the Right Honourable John Lord Henniker, to grant a Lease of certain Lands in the County of Sussex, for the Term of Ninety-nine Years, to Edward Frisby Howis, pursuant to an Agreement entered into in that Behalf.
Earl of Cassillis's Estate Act 1809	49 Geo. 3. c. 29 Pr.	12 May 1809
An Act for empowering the Judges of the Court of Session io Scotland to sell certain Parts and Portions of the entailed Estate of Cassillis for Payment of the Debts contracted by David late Earl of Cassillis, and still owing; and for altering in Part an Act, passed in the last Session of Parliament, (Note: Earl of Cassillis's Estate Act 1808 (48 Geo. 3. c. 7 Pr.)) concerning the Estate of Cullean.
Campbell's Estate Act 1809	49 Geo. 3. c. 30 Pr.	12 May 1809
An Act for vesting the Lands of Glenkinglas, and certain other Lands, being Part of the Lands contained in a Deed of Entail, executed by the deceased Sir Duncan Campbell, of Lochnell, upon the Fifteenth Day of May One thousand seven hundred and sixty-two, in Trustees, in trust, to sell the same, and invest the Money arising by such Sale in the Purchase of other Lands, to be settled and secured to the same Series of Heirs, and under the same Conditions and Limitations as are contained in the aforesaid Deed of Entail.
Menzies' Estate Act 1809	49 Geo. 3. c. 31 Pr.	12 May 1809
An Act for empowering the Judges of the Court of Session in Scotland, to sell certain Parts and Portions of the entailed Estate of Lochlane, situated in the County of Perth, which belonged to and was entailed by the late Anne Campbell, otherwise Menzies, of Fairntoun, sufficient for Payment of her Debts, and to raise a Sum for the Purchase of other Lands and Hereditaments contiguous to, and convenient for, the said entailed Estate, to be entailed in the like Manner, in lieu of the Parts and Portions sold.
High Offley Inclosure Act 1809	49 Geo. 3. c. 32 Pr.	12 May 1809
An Act for inclosing Lands in the Parish of High Offley, in the County of Stafford.
Rothwell, &c. Inclosure Act 1809	49 Geo. 3. c. 33 Pr.	12 May 1809
An Act for inclosing Lands in the Townships of Rothwell with Royds, and Oulton with Woodlesford, in the West Riding of the County of York.
Abbotsbury Inclosure Act 1809	49 Geo. 3. c. 34 Pr.	12 May 1809
An Act for inclosing Lands in the Parish of Abbotsbury, in the County of Dorset.
Compton Valence Inclosure Act 1809	49 Geo. 3. c. 35 Pr.	12 May 1809
An Act for dividing and inclosing Lands in the Parish of Compton Vallence, otherwise East Compton, in the County of Dorset.
Fordham Inclosure Act 1809	49 Geo. 3. c. 36 Pr.	12 May 1809
An Act for allotting Lands in the Parish of Fordham, in the County of Cambridge.
Pimperne Inclosure Act 1809	49 Geo. 3. c. 37 Pr.	12 May 1809
An Act or allotting Lands in the Parish of Pimperne, in the County of Dorset.
Bourn Inclosure Act 1809	49 Geo. 3. c. 38 Pr.	12 May 1809
An Act for inclosing Lands in the Parish of Bourn, in the County of Cambridge.
Englefield Inclosure Act 1809	49 Geo. 3. c. 39 Pr.	12 May 1809
An Act for inclosing Lands in the Manor and Parish of Englefield, in the County of Berks.
Plush Inclosure Act 1809	49 Geo. 3. c. 40 Pr.	12 May 1809
An Act for inclosing Lands in the Tithing of Plush, in the County of Dorset.
Normanby Inclosure Act 1809	49 Geo. 3. c. 41 Pr.	12 May 1809
An Act for inclosing Lands in the Township of Normanby and Parish of Ormesby, in the North Riding of the County of York.
Seamer Inclosure Act 1809	49 Geo. 3. c. 42 Pr.	12 May 1809
An Act for inclosing Lands in the Parish of Seamer, in the North Riding of the County of York.
Iccomb Inclosure Act 1809	49 Geo. 3. c. 43 Pr.	12 May 1809
An Act for inclosing Lands in the Parish or Iccomb, in the County of Worcester.
Barwick-in-Elmet Inclosure Act 1809	49 Geo. 3. c. 44 Pr.	12 May 1809
An Act to render valid and effectual the Proceedings of the Commissioners under an Act (Note: Barwick-in-Elmet Inclosure Act 1796 (36 Geo. 3 c. 95 Pr.)) for dividing and inclosing the several open Fields and Waste Grounds, in the Parish of Barwick in Elmet, in the County of York.
Chilton Foliat Act 1809	49 Geo. 3. c. 45 Pr.	12 May 1809
An Act for inclosing Lands tn the Parish of Chilton Foliat, in the Counties of Wilts and Berks.
Bunwell Inclosure Act 1809	49 Geo. 3. c. 46 Pr.	12 May 1809
An Act for inclosing Lands in the Parish of Bunwell, in the County of Norfolk.
Altofts Inclosure Act 1809	49 Geo. 3. c. 47 Pr.	12 May 1809
An Act for inclosing Lands in the Township of Altofts, in the Parish of Normanton in the Weft Riding of the County of York
Chidham Inclosure Act 1809	49 Geo. 3. c. 48 Pr.	12 May 1809
An Act for inclosing Lands in the Parish of Chidham, in the County of Sussex.
Llanfirnach Inclosure Act 1809	49 Geo. 3. c. 49 Pr.	12 May 1809
An Act for inclosing Lands in the Parish of Llanfirnach, in the County of Pembroke.
Berrynarbor Inclosure Act 1809	49 Geo. 3. c. 50 Pr.	12 May 1809
An Act for inclosing Lands in the Parish of Berrynarhor, in the County of Devon.
Marske Inclosure Act 1809	49 Geo. 3. c. 51 Pr.	12 May 1809
An Act for inclosing Lands in the Manor of Marske, in the County of York.
Thoralby Inclosure Act 1809	49 Geo. 3. c. 52 Pr.	12 May 1809
An Act for inclosing Lands in the Manor of Thoralby, in the Parth of Aisgarth, in the North Riding of the County of York.
Lingfield Inclosure Act 1809	49 Geo. 3. c. 53 Pr.	12 May 1809
An Act for inclosing Lands in the Parish of Lingfield, in the County of Surrey.
Wheatacre Inclosure Act 1809	49 Geo. 3. c. 54 Pr.	12 May 1809
An Act for inclosing Lands in the Parish of Wheatacre All Saints, in the County of Norfolk.
Glenfield Inclosure Act 1809	49 Geo. 3. c. 55 Pr.	12 May 1809
An Act for inclosing Lands in Glenfield, in the County of Leicester.
Angmering Inclosure Act 1809	49 Geo. 3. c. 56 Pr.	12 May 1809
An Act for inclosing the Open and Common Fields in the Parish of Angmering, otherwise East Angmering and West Angmering annexed, in the County of Sussex.
Metcalfe's Name Act 1809	49 Geo. 3. c. 57 Pr.	12 May 1809
An Act to enable the Reverend George Marwood (lately called George Metcalfe), and this Issue, to take use and bear the Surname and Arms of Marwood, pursuant to the Will of Jane Turner, Widow, deceased.
Cummerow's Naturalization Act 1809	49 Geo. 3. c. 58 Pr.	12 May 1809
An Act for naturalizing Charles Cummerow.
Blackwood's Estate Act 1809	49 Geo. 3. c. 59 Pr.	20 May 1809
An Act for empowering the Judges of the Court of Session in Scotland to sell such Parts of the entailed Estate of Pitreavie in the Parish of Dunfermline and County of Fife in Scotland, now belonging to Shovel Blackwood Esquire, as shall be sufficient for Payment or the Debts affecting the same.
Mordiford Inclosure Act 1809	49 Geo. 3. c. 60 Pr.	20 May 1809
An Act for inclosing Lands in and adjoining or near to the Parish of Mordiford, in the County of Hereford.
Ravensden Inclosure Act 1809	49 Geo. 3. c. 61 Pr.	20 May 1809
An Act for inclosing Lands in the Parish of Ravensden, in the County of Bedford.
Bodham Inclosure Act 1809	49 Geo. 3. c. 62 Pr.	20 May 1809
An Act to amend an Act passed in the Forty-eighth Year of His present Majesty, (Note: Bodham Inclosure Act 1808 (48 Geo. 3. c. lxxxiv)) for inclosing Lands in the Parish of Bodham, in the County of Norfolk.
Longsutton Inclosure Act 1809	49 Geo. 3. c. 63 Pr.	20 May 1809
An Act for inclosing Lands in Longsutton, in the County of Somerset.
Milton Inclosure Act 1809	49 Geo. 3. c. 64 Pr.	20 May 1809
An Act for inclosing Lands in the Parish of Milton, in the County of Berks.
Sutton Inclosure Act 1809	49 Geo. 3. c. 65 Pr.	20 May 1809
An Act for inclosing Lands in the Manor and Parish of Sutton, in the County of Surrey.
Llanfachreth, &c. Inclosure Act 1809	49 Geo. 3. c. 66 Pr.	20 May 1809
An Act for inclosing Lands in the Townships of Nannauuwch-r-Afon, Nannau-îs'-r-Afon and Llanelltyd, in the Parishes of Llanfachreth and Llanelltyd, in the County of Merioneth.
West Wratting Inclosure Act 1809	49 Geo. 3. c. 67 Pr.	20 May 1809
An Act for inclosing Lands in the Parish of West Wratting, in the County of Cambridge.
Basildon Inclosure Act 1809	49 Geo. 3. c. 68 Pr.	20 May 1809
An Act for inclosing Lands in the Parish of Basildon, in the County of Berks.
Irton Inclosure Act 1809	49 Geo. 3. c. 69 Pr.	20 May 1809
An Act for inclosing Lands in the Parish of Irton, in the County of Cumberland.
Sampford Peverell, &c. Inclosure Act 1809	49 Geo. 3. c. 70 Pr.	20 May 1809
An Act for inclosing Lands in the Parishes of Sampford Peverell, Burliscombe, and Halberton, in the County of Devon.
Holt and Letheringsett Inclosure Act 1809	49 Geo. 3. c. 71 Pr.	20 May 1809
An Act to amend an Act passed in the Forty-seventh Year of His present Majesty (Note: Holt and Letheringsett Inclosure Act 1807 (47 Geo. 3 Sess. 2. c. 19 Pr.)) for inclosing Lands in the Parishes of Holt and Letheringsett, in the County of Norfolk.
Warningcamp Inclosure Act 1809	49 Geo. 3. c. 72 Pr.	20 May 1809
An Act for inclosing Lands in the Vill, Hamlet, or Parish of Warningcamp, in the County of Sussex.
Ilsington Inclosure Act 1809	49 Geo. 3. c. 73 Pr.	20 May 1809
An Act for inclosing Lands in the Parish of Ilsington, in the County of Devon.
North Creake Inclosure Act 1809	49 Geo. 3. c. 74 Pr.	20 May 1809
An Act for inclosing Lands in the Parish of North Creake, in the County of Norfolk.
Wensley Inclosure Act 1809	49 Geo. 3. c. 75 Pr.	20 May 1809
An Act for inclosing Lands in the Parish of Wensley, in the County of York.
Carperby Inclosure Act 1809	49 Geo. 3. c. 76 Pr.	20 May 1809
An Act for inclosing Lands in the Manor of Carperby and Parish of Aisgarth, in the County of York.
Horbury Inclosure Act 1809	49 Geo. 3. c. 77 Pr.	20 May 1809
An Act for inclosing Lands in the Township of Horbury, in the Parish of Wakefield, in the West Riding of the County of York.
Cullingworth Inclosure Act 1809	49 Geo. 3. c. 78 Pr.	20 May 1809
An Act for inclosing Lands in the Township or Hamlet of Cullingworth in the Manor and Parish of Bingley, in the West Riding of the County of York.
West Wellow Inclosure Act 1809	49 Geo. 3. c. 79 Pr.	20 May 1809
An Act for inclosing Lands in the Parish of West Wellow, in the County of Wilts.
Gillingham, &c. Inclosure Act 1809	49 Geo. 3. c. 80 Pr.	20 May 1809
An Act for inclosing Lands in the Parishes of Gillingham and Motcombe, in the County of Dorset.
Great Washbourne Inclosure Act 1809	49 Geo. 3. c. 81 Pr.	27 May 1809
An Act for inclosing Lands in the Parish of Great Washbourne, in the County of Gloucester.
Longthorpe Inclosure Act 1809	49 Geo. 3. c. 82 Pr.	27 May 1809
An Act for confirming and establishing the Division and Inclosure of certain Lands in the Hamlet of Longthorpe, in the County of Northampton.
North Duffield Inclosure Act 1809	49 Geo. 3. c. 83 Pr.	27 May 1809
An Act for inclosing Lands in the Township of North Duffield, in the Parish of Skipwith, in the East Riding of the County of York.
Westin's Naturalization Act 1809	49 Geo. 3. c. 84 Pr.	27 May 1809
An Act for naturalizing Gustavus Westin.
Myers' Naturalization Act 1809	49 Geo. 3. c. 85 Pr.	27 May 1809
An Act for naturalizing Henry Myers.
Horstman's Naturalization Act 1809	49 Geo. 3. c. 86 Pr.	27 May 1809
An Act for naturalizing John Horstman.
Marquis of Tweeddale's Estate Act 1809	49 Geo. 3. c. 87 Pr.	3 June 1809
An Act for felling the Lands and Estate of Appine, situated in the County of Argyle, and a Salmon Fishing situated in the County of Inverness, which were comprized in a Deed of Entail made by George late Marquis of Tweeddale, and the Trustees appointed by George sometime Marquis of Tweeddale deceased, and for investing the Money arising by such Sale in the Purchase of other Lands to be settled and secured to the same Series of Heirs, and under the same Conditions and Limitations as are contained in the aforesaid Deed of Entail.
St. Mary Woolwich Rectory Act 1809	49 Geo. 3. c. 88 Pr.	3 June 1809
An Act to enable the Rector of the Parish and Parish Church of Saint Mary Woolwich, in the County of Kent, for the Time being, to grant Building Leases of the Glebe Lands belonging to the said Rectory, and to sell the present Rectory House and Garden, and to build a new Rectory House.
Holland Fen Chapel Act 1809	49 Geo. 3. c. 89 Pr.	3 June 1809
An Act for changing the Scite of Holland Fen Chapel, (Note: All Saints Church, Holland Fen.) and for authorizing the Erection and Establishment thereof in the Parish of Fosdyke, in the County of Lincoln, instead of in the Parish of Algarkirke, in the said County.
Bredwardine and Dorston Inclosure Act 1809	49 Geo. 3. c. 90 Pr.	3 June 1809
An Act for inclosing Lands in the Parish of Bredwardine and the Township of Dorston, in the Parsh of Dorston, in the County of Hereford.
Flitton, &c. Inclosure Act 1809	49 Geo. 3. c. 91 Pr.	3 June 1809
An Act for inclosing Lands in the Parishes of Flitton-cum-Silsoe and Pulloxhill, in the County of Bedford.
Leaton Inclosure Act 1809	49 Geo. 3. c. 92 Pr.	3 June 1809
An Act for inclosing Lands in the Township and Manor of Leaton, in the Parish of Saint Mary in Shrewsbury, in the County of Salop.
West Kington Inclosure Act 1809	49 Geo. 3. c. 93 Pr.	3 June 1809
An Act for inclosing Lands in the Manor or Lordship of West Kington, in the Parish of West Kington, in the County of Wilts.
Forncett Inclosure Act 1809	49 Geo. 3. c. 94 Pr.	3 June 1809
An Act for inclosing Lands in the Parishes of Forncett Saint Peter and Forncett Saint Mary, in the County of Norfolk.
West Melbury Inclosure Act 1809	49 Geo. 3. c. 95 Pr.	3 June 1809
An Act for inclosing Lands in the Tithing of West Melbury, in the Parish of Cann Saint Rumbold, in the County of Dorset.
Skelton Inclosure Act 1809	49 Geo. 3. c. 96 Pr.	3 June 1809
An Act for inclosing Lands in the Township of Skelton, in the Parish of Howden, in the East Riding of the County of York.
Austwick Inclosure Act 1809	49 Geo. 3. c. 97 Pr.	3 June 1809
An Act for inclosing and reducing to a Stint several Commons and Waste Grounds within the Township and Manor of Austwick, in the Parish of Clapham, in the West Riding of the County of York.
Strumpshaw Inclosure Act 1809	49 Geo. 3. c. 98 Pr.	3 June 1809
An Act for inclosing Lands in the Parishes of Strumpshaw and Surlingham, in the County of Norfolk.
Whittlesford Inclosure Act 1809	49 Geo. 3. c. 99 Pr.	3 June 1809
An Act for inclosing Lands in the Parish of Whittlesford, in the County of Cambridge.
Bishopston, &c. Inclosure Act 1809	49 Geo. 3. c. 100 Pr.	3 June 1809
An Act for inclosing Lands in the Parishes of Bishopston and Mansell Lacy, otherwise Much Mansell, in the County of Hereford.
Birkin Inclosure Act 1809	49 Geo. 3. c. 101 Pr.	3 June 1809
An Act for inclosing Lands in or appertaining to the Manor and Township of Birkin, in the West Riding of the County of York.
Stanton Inclosure Act 1809	49 Geo. 3. c. 102 Pr.	3 June 1809
An Act for inclosing Lands in the Township, Hamlet, or Manor of Stanton, in the County of Derby.
Smythe's Estate Act 1809	49 Geo. 3. c. 103 Pr.	10 June 1809
An Act for settling and securing the Lands of Tippermallow, Meckven, and Whitebank, and the Lands of Cloag or Cloyock, and other Hereditaments lying in the County of Perth, to and in favour of Robert Smythe of Methven Esquire, and the Series of Heirs mentioned, and under the Conditions and Limitations specified in a Deed of Entail made by David Smythe sometime of Methven, deceased, and in lieu thereof, for vesting certain Parts of the Lands, Lordship, Barony, and Regality of Methven, and of the Lands and Barony of Reilour, lying in the said County, in the said Robert Smythe and his Heirs and Assigns in Fee Simple.
Stokeintinhead Inclosure Act 1809	49 Geo. 3. c. 104 Pr.	10 June 1809
An Act for inclosing Lands in the Parish of Stokeintinhead, in the County of Devon.
Swanton Abbott Inclosure Act 1809	49 Geo. 3. c. 105 Pr.	10 June 1809
An Act for inclosing Lands in the Parishes of Swanton, Abbott, Lamas, and Buxton, in the County of Norfolk.
Bishopstone Inclosure Act 1809	49 Geo. 3. c. 106 Pr.	10 June 1809
An Act for inclosing Lands in the Parish of Bishopstone, otherwise Bushopstone, in the County of Wilts.
Chatteris Inclosure Act 1809	49 Geo. 3. c. 107 Pr.	10 June 1809
An Act for inclosing Lands in the Parish of Chatteris, in the Isle of Ely, and County of Cambridge.
Henry's Naturalization Act 1809	49 Geo. 3. c. 108 Pr.	10 June 1809
An Act for naturalizing Nicholas Henry.
Stanmer Rectory Act 1809	49 Geo. 3. c. 109 Pr.	15 June 1809
An Act for uniting the Rectory and Parish Church of Stanmer, in the County of Sussex, with the adjoining Vicarage and Parish Church of Falmer; and also for exchanging the Parsonage House and Glebe Land of Stanmer, and the Vicarage House of Falmer for a Piece of Land at Falmer, Part of the settled Estates of the Right Honourable Thomas Earl of Chichester, and for a new Parsonage House to be built thereon, at the Expence of the said Earl.
Busby's Estate Act 1809	49 Geo. 3. c. 110 Pr.	15 June 1809
An Act for effectuating a Partition directed by the Court of Chancery of certain Fee Farm and Annual Rents arising and issuing within the Counties of Essex and Huntingdon, and of divers Messuages, Parcels of Ground, and Hereditaments situate in the Parish of Saint Matthew Bethnal Green, in the County of Middlesex, devised by the Will of Henry Busby Esquire, deceased; and also for enabling the Trustees or Persons in Possession, as Tenants for Life, of certain of the Premises to grant Building Leases, and for other Purposes.
Company of Armorers and Brasiers Estate Act 1809	49 Geo. 3. c. 111 Pr.	15 June 1809
An Act to enable the Company of Armorers and Brasiers in the City of London to sell and convey to the Governor and Company of the Bank of England several Lands and Tenements in the Parish of Saint Olave Jewry, London, formerly of Dame Elizabeth Morrys, discharged from the Trusts for charitable Purposes affecting the same, by virtue of the Will of the said Dame Elizabeth Morrys, and to subject other Lands and Tenements of the said Company of Armorers and Brasiers to the like Trusts.
Helperby Inclosure Act 1809	49 Geo. 3. c. 112 Pr.	15 June 1809
An Act for inclosing Lands in the Township of Helperby in the Parish of Brafferton, in the North Riding of the County of York.

=== Sources ===
- The Statutes of the United Kingdom of Great Britain and Ireland. Vol. 48: 49 George III. London: Joseph Butterworth. 1809 – via Internet Archive.
- The Statutes of the United Kingdom of Great Britain and Ireland. Vol. 48: 49 George III. London: Joseph Butterworth. 1809 – via Google Books.
- Journals of the House of Commons. Vol. 64. London: His Majesty's Stationery Office. pp. 3–422 – via Google Books.
- Chronological Table of and Index to the Statutes. Vol. 1: To the End of the Session 59 Vict. Sess. 2 (1895) (13th ed.). London: Her Majesty's Stationery Office. 1896. pp. 191–194 – via Google Books.
- "Statutes of the United Kingdom of Great Britain and Ireland, 1809". Irish Statute Book. Office of the Attorney General, Government of Ireland.

== See also ==
- List of acts of the Parliament of the United Kingdom
