= List of acts of the Parliament of Great Britain from 1787 =

This is a complete list of acts of the Parliament of Great Britain for the year 1787.

For acts passed until 1707, see the list of acts of the Parliament of England and the list of acts of the Parliament of Scotland. See also the list of acts of the Parliament of Ireland.

For acts passed from 1801 onwards, see the list of acts of the Parliament of the United Kingdom. For acts of the devolved parliaments and assemblies in the United Kingdom, see the list of acts of the Scottish Parliament, the list of acts of the Northern Ireland Assembly, and the list of acts and measures of Senedd Cymru; see also the list of acts of the Parliament of Northern Ireland.

The number shown after each act's title is its chapter number. Acts are cited using this number, preceded by the year(s) of the reign during which the relevant parliamentary session was held; thus the Union with Ireland Act 1800 is cited as "39 & 40 Geo. 3. c. 67", meaning the 67th act passed during the session that started in the 39th year of the reign of George III and which finished in the 40th year of that reign. Note that the modern convention is to use Arabic numerals in citations (thus "41 Geo. 3" rather than "41 Geo. III"). Acts of the last session of the Parliament of Great Britain and the first session of the Parliament of the United Kingdom are both cited as "41 Geo. 3".

Acts passed by the Parliament of Great Britain did not have a short title; however, some of these acts have subsequently been given a short title by acts of the Parliament of the United Kingdom (such as the Short Titles Act 1896).

Before the Acts of Parliament (Commencement) Act 1793 came into force on 8 April 1793, acts passed by the Parliament of Great Britain were deemed to have come into effect on the first day of the session in which they were passed. Because of this, the years given in the list below may in fact be the year before a particular act was passed.

== 27 Geo. 3 ==
The fourth session of the 16th Parliament of Great Britain, which met from 23 January 1787 until 30 May 1787.

This session was also traditionally cited as 27 G. 3.

=== Public acts ===
Short title	Citation	Royal assent
Long title
Lottery Act 1787 (repealed)	27 Geo. 3. c. 1	23 February 1787
An Act to render more effectual the Laws now in being for suppressing unlawful Lotteries. (Repealed by Lotteries Act 1806 (46 Geo. 3. c. 148))
New South Wales Courts Act 1787 or the New South Wales Act 1787 (repealed)	27 Geo. 3. c. 2	23 February 1787
An Act to enable His Majesty to establish a Court of Criminal Judicature on the Eastern Coast of New South Wales and the Parts adjacent. (Repealed by Statute Law Revision Act 1871 (34 & 35 Vict. c. 116))
Marine Mutiny Act 1787 (repealed)	27 Geo. 3. c. 3	23 February 1787
An Act for the Regulation of His Majesty's Marine Forces while on Shore. (Repealed by Statute Law Revision Act 1871 (34 & 35 Vict. c. 116))
Malt Duties Act 1787 (repealed)	27 Geo. 3. c. 4	5 March 1787
An Act for continuing and granting to His Majesty, certain Duties upon Malt, Mum, Cyder, and Perry, for the Service of the Year One thousand seven hundred and eighty-seven. (Repealed by Statute Law Revision Act 1871 (34 & 35 Vict. c. 116))
Land Tax Act 1787 (repealed)	27 Geo. 3. c. 5	5 March 1787
An Act for granting an Aid to His Majesty, by a Land Tax, to be raised in Great Britain, for the Service of the Year One thousand seven hundred and eighty-seven. (Repealed by Statute Law Revision Act 1871 (34 & 35 Vict. c. 116))
Mutiny Act 1787 (repealed)	27 Geo. 3. c. 6	22 March 1787
An Act for punishing Mutiny and Desertion, and for the better Payment of the Army and their Quarters. (Repealed by Statute Law Revision Act 1871 (34 & 35 Vict. c. 116))
Trade with America Act 1787 (repealed)	27 Geo. 3. c. 7	30 March 1787
An Act to continue the Laws now in Force for regulating the Trade between the Subjects of His Majesty's Dominions and the Inhabitants of the Territories belonging to the United States of America, and to render the Provisions thereof more effectual. (Repealed by Statute Law Revision Act 1871 (34 & 35 Vict. c. 116))
Militia Pay, etc. Act 1787 (repealed)	27 Geo. 3. c. 8	30 March 1787
An Act for defraying the Charge of the Pay and Cloathing of the Militia in that Part of Great Britain called England, for One Year, beginning the Twenty-fifth Day of March One thousand seven hundred and eighty-seven, for indemnifying Deputy Lieutenants and Officers of the Militia who have neglected to transmit Descriptions of their Qualifications to the Clerks of the Peace within the Time limited by Law, and for giving further Time for that Purpose. (Repealed by Statute Law Revision Act 1871 (34 & 35 Vict. c. 116))
Postage Act 1787 (repealed)	27 Geo. 3. c. 9	30 March 1787
An Act for granting Rates of Postage for the Conveyance of Letters and Packets between Great Britain and the Port of Waterford in the Kingdom of Ireland, by Way of Milford Haven. (Repealed by Post Office (Repeal of Laws) Act 1837 (7 Will. 4. & 1 Vict. c. 32))
Fisheries Act 1787 (repealed)	27 Geo. 3. c. 10	5 April 1787
An Act to extend the Provisions of an Act made in the Twenty-sixth Year of his present Majesty's Reign, intituled, "An Act for the more effectual Encouragement of the British Fisheries." (Note: Fisheries (No. 2) Act 1786 (26 Geo. 3. c. 81)) (Repealed by Sea Fisheries Act 1868 (31 & 32 Vict. c. 45))
Vagrants and Criminals Act 1787 (repealed)	27 Geo. 3. c. 11	5 April 1787
An Act to explain and amend so much of an Act made in the Sixth Year of the Reign of King George the First, (Note: Perpetuation, etc. of Acts 1719 (6 Geo. 1. c. 19)) intituled, "An Act for making perpetual so much of an Act made in the Tenth Year of the Reign of Queen Anne, (Note: Continuance of Laws Act 1711 (10 Ann. c. 24)) for the reviving and continuing several Acts therein mentioned, as relates to the building and repairing County Gaols; and also an Act of the Eleventh and Twelfth Years of the Reign of King William the Third, (Note: Piracy Act 1698 (11 Will. 3. c. 7)) for the more effectual Suppression of Piracy; and for making more effectual the Act of the Thirteenth Year of the Reign of King Charles the Second, (Note: Navy Act 1661 (13 Cha. 2. St. 1. c. 9)) intituled, 'An Act for establishing Articles and Orders for the regulating and better Government of His Majesty's Ships of War and Forces by Sea,'" as gives a discretionary Power to Magistrates to commit Vagrants, and other Criminals, Offenders, and Persons charged with small Offences, either to the common Goal or House of Correction. (Repealed by Statute Law Revision Act 1871 (34 & 35 Vict. c. 116))
Annuity to Sir John Skynner Act 1787 (repealed)	27 Geo. 3. c. 12	5 April 1787
An Act to enable His Majesty to grant a certain Annuity to the Right Honourable Sir John Skynner Knight, late Lord Chief Baron of His Majesty's Court of Exchequer, in Consideration of his Diligent and meritorious Services, and of his faithful and upright Conduct in the Execution of that Office. (Repealed by Statute Law Revision Act 1871 (34 & 35 Vict. c. 116))
Customs and Excise Act 1787 (repealed)	27 Geo. 3. c. 13	25 April 1787
An Act for repealing the several Duties of Customs and Excise, and granting other Duties in Lieu thereof; and for applying the said Duties, together with the other Duties composing the Publick Revenue; for permitting the Importation of certain Goods, Wares, and Merchandize, the produce or manufacture of the European Dominions of the French King into this Kingdom; and for applying certain unclaimed Monies remaining in the Exchequer for the Payment of Annuities on Lives, to the Reduction of the National Debt. (Repealed by Statute Law Revision Act 1871 (34 & 35 Vict. c. 116))
Canterbury (Streets) Act 1787 (repealed)	27 Geo. 3. c. 14	22 March 1787
An Act for paving, cleansing, lighting, and watching the Streets, Lanes, and other public Passages and Places within the Walls of the City of Canterbury and the Liberties thereof, and also several Streets and other Places near or adjoining to the said City; and for removing and preventing Encroachments, Obstructions, Nuisances, and Annoyances therein. (Repealed by Canterbury Streets Act 1825 (6 Geo. 4. c. clxxviii), Canterbury Improvement Act 1841 (4 & 5 Vict. c. lxvi), Canterbury Improvement Act 1844 (7 & 8 Vict. c. liii), Local Government Supplemental Act 1866 (29 & 30 Vict. c. 24), Local Government Board's Provisional Orders Confirmation (No. 9) Act 1890 (53 & 54 Vict. c. clxxviii) and County of Kent Act 1981 (c. xviii))
Gainsborough Bridge Act 1787 (repealed)	27 Geo. 3. c. 15	30 March 1787
An Act for building a Bridge at or near the Ferry over the River Trent, from Gainsborough in the County of Lincoln, to the opposite Shore in the Parish of Saundby in the County of Nottingham. (Repealed by Gainsborough Bridge (Acquisition) Act 1927 (17 & 18 Geo. 5. c. lxxxvii))
Negotiations of Certain Notes and Bills Act 1787 (repealed)	27 Geo. 3. c. 16	21 May 1787
An Act for making perpetual Two Acts passed in the Fifteenth (Note: Negotiations of Notes and Bills Act 1775 (15 Geo. 3. c. 51)) and Seventeenth (Note: Bills of Exchange Act 1776 (17 Geo. 3. c. 30)) Years of the Reign of His present Majesty, for restraining the Negotiation of Promissory Notes and Bills of Exchange, under a limited Sum, within that Part of Great Britain called England. (Repealed by Statute Law Revision Act 1871 (34 & 35 Vict. c. 116))
East Stonehouse Chapel Act 1787	27 Geo. 3. c. 17	25 April 1787
An Act for re-building the Chapel of East Stonehouse in the County of Devon.
Justiciary Circuit and Courts (Scotland) Act 1787 (repealed)	27 Geo. 3. c. 18	21 May 1787
An Act for making perpetual an Act made in the Twenty-third Year of the Reign of His present Majesty, intituled, "An Act for regulating the Proceedings of the Court of Justiciary, and Circuit Courts in Scotland." (Note: Justiciary and Circuit Courts (Scotland) Act 1783 (23 Geo. 3. c. 45)) (Repealed by Statute Law Revision Act 1871 (34 & 35 Vict. c. 116))
Shipping and Navigation Act 1787 (repealed)	27 Geo. 3. c. 19	30 May 1787
An Act to enforce and render more effectual several Acts passed in the Twelfth Year of the Reign of King Charles the Second, (Note: Navigation Act 1660 (12 Cha. 2. c. 18)) and other Acts made for the Increase and Encouragement of Shipping and Navigation. (Repealed by Statute Law Revision Act 1861 (24 & 25 Vict. c. 101))
Forth and Clyde Navigation Act 1787 (repealed)	27 Geo. 3. c. 20	21 May 1787
An Act for varying and extending the Powers of the Company of Proprietors of the Forth and Clyde Navigation. (Repealed by Forth and Clyde Navigation Act 1841 (4 & 5 Vict. c. lv))
Exemption from Coal Duty Act 1787 (repealed)	27 Geo. 3. c. 21	28 May 1787
An Act to enable the Lords Commissioners of His Majesty's Treasury, to purchase of the Proprietors of Coal Mines and Coal Works, on the Estate of Pitferran, in the County of Fife, the Right of Exemption from Payment of the Duty on Coals exported. (Repealed by Statute Law Revision Act 1871 (34 & 35 Vict. c. 116))
Sale of Certain Houses, etc., Belonging to His Majesty Act 1787 (repealed)	27 Geo. 3. c. 22	28 May 1787
An Act for Sale of certain Houses and Ground belonging to His Majesty. (Repealed by Crown Lands in Privy Garden, Westminster Act 1792 (32 Geo. 3. c. 24) and Crown Land Revenues Act 1794 (34 Geo. 3. c. 75))
Loans or Exchequer Bills Act 1787 (repealed)	27 Geo. 3. c. 23	28 May 1787
An Act for raising a certain Sum of Money by Loans or Exchequer Bills, for the Service of the Year One thousand seven hundred and eighty-seven. (Repealed by Statute Law Revision Act 1871 (34 & 35 Vict. c. 116))
Loans or Exchequer Bills (No. 2) Act 1787 (repealed)	27 Geo. 3. c. 24	28 May 1787
An Act for raising a further Sum of Money, by Loans or Exchequer Bills, for the Service of the Year One thousand seven hundred and eighty-seven. (Repealed by Statute Law Revision Act 1871 (34 & 35 Vict. c. 116))
Exchequer Bills Act 1787 (repealed)	27 Geo. 3. c. 25	28 May 1787
An Act for raising a further Sum of Money, by Exchequer Bills for the Service of the Year One thousand seven hundred and eighty-seven. (Repealed by Statute Law Revision Act 1871 (34 & 35 Vict. c. 116))
Post Horse Duties Act 1787 (repealed)	27 Geo. 3. c. 26	28 May 1787
An Act to enable the Lord High Treasurer or Commissioners of the Treasury for the Time being, to let to Farm the Duties granted by an Act made in Twenty-fifth Year of His present Majesty's Reign, (Note: Duties on Post Horses, etc. Act 1785 (25 Geo. 3. c. 51)) on Horses let to Hire for travelling Post, and by Time, to such Persons as should be willing to contract for the same. (Repealed by Duties on Horses Act 1823 (4 Geo. 4. c. 62))
Importation and Exportation Act 1787 (repealed)	27 Geo. 3. c. 27	28 May 1787
An Act for allowing the Importation and Exportation of certain Goods, Wares, and Merchandize in the Ports of Kingston, (Note: Kingston, Jamaica.) Savannah La Mar, (Note: Savanna-la-Mar, Jamaica.) Montego Bay, (Note: Montego Bay, Jamaica.) and Santa Lucea (Note: Lucea, Jamaica.) in the Island of Jamaica, in the Port of Saint George (Note: St. George's, Grenada.) in the Island of Grenada, in the Port of Roseau (Note: Roseau, Dominica.) in the Island of Dominica, and in the Port of Nassau (Note: Nassau, The Bahamas.) in the Island of New Providence, one of the Bahama Islands, under certain Regulations and Restrictions. (Repealed by Statute Law Revision Act 1861 (24 & 25 Vict. c. 101))
Glass Duties Act 1787 (repealed)	27 Geo. 3. c. 28	30 May 1787
An Act for granting to His Majesty a certain Duties on Glass imported into Great Britain, and for altering the Mode of charging the Duties on Glass made in Great Britain. (Repealed by Glass Duties Act 1838 (1 & 2 Vict. c. 44))
Competency of Witnesses Act 1787 (repealed)	27 Geo. 3. c. 29	28 May 1787
An Act for obviating Objections to the Competency of Witnesses in certain Cases. (Repealed by Statute Law Revision Act 1861 (24 & 25 Vict. c. 101))
Duties on Spirit Licences Act 1787 (repealed)	27 Geo. 3. c. 30	30 May 1787
An Act for laying additional Duties upon Licences to be taken out by Persons dealing by Retail in Spirituous Liquors. (Repealed by Statute Law Revision Act 1861 (24 & 25 Vict. c. 101) (Note: Incorrectly cited as "SLR 1871" in the Chronological Table of the Statutes.))
Exports Act 1787 (repealed)	27 Geo. 3. c. 31	30 May 1787
An Act for making Allowances to the Dealers in Foreign Wines, for the Stock of certain Foreign Wines in their Possession at a certain Time, upon which the Duties on Importation have been paid; and for amending several Laws relative to the Revenue of Excise. (Repealed by Statute Law Revision Act 1861 (24 & 25 Vict. c. 101) and Statute Law Revision Act 1948 (11 & 12 Geo. 6. c. 62))
Smuggling, etc. Act 1787 (repealed)	27 Geo. 3. c. 32	30 May 1787
An Act for making further Provisions in regard to such Vessels as are particularly described in an Act made in the Twenty-fourth Year of the Reign of His present Majesty, (Note: Smuggling Act 1784 (24 Geo. 3. Sess. 2. c. 47)) for the more effectual Prevention of Smuggling in this Kingdom, and for extending the said Act to other Vessels and Boats not particularly described therein; for taking off the Duties on Flasks in which Wine or Oil is imported; for laying an additional Duty on foreign Geneva imported; for taking off the Duty on Ebony the Growth of Africa, imported into this Kingdom; and for amending several Laws relative to the Revenue of Customs. (Repealed by Customs Law Repeal Act 1825 (6 Geo. 4. c. 105))
Appropriation Act 1787 (repealed)	27 Geo. 3. c. 33	30 May 1787
An Act for granting to His Majesty a certain Sum of Money out of the consolidated Fund, and for applying certain Monies therein mentioned for the Service of the Year One thousand seven hundred and eighty-seven; and for further appropriating the Supplies granted in this Session of Parliament. (Repealed by Statute Law Revision Act 1871 (34 & 35 Vict. c. 116))
Duchy of Lancaster Act 1787	27 Geo. 3. c. 34	28 May 1787
An Act to amend an Act passed in the Nineteenth Year of the Reign of His present Majesty, intituled, "An Act to enable the Chancellor and Council of the Duchy of Lancaster, to sell and dispose of certain Fee-farm Rents, and other Rents, and to enfranchise Copyhold and Customary Tenements, within their Survey, and to encourage the Growth of Timber on Lands held of the said Duchy," (Note: Duchy of Lancaster Act 1779 (19 Geo. 3. c. 45)) and to enable the said Chancellor and Council, to discharge Incumbrances affecting the Possessions of the said Duchy.
Inquiry into Fees, Public Offices Act 1787 (repealed)	27 Geo. 3. c. 35	30 May 1787
An Act for appointing Commissioners further to enquire into the Fees, Gratuities, Perquisites, and Emoluments, which are or have been lately received in the several Public Offices therein mentioned, to examine into any Abuses which may exist in the same, and to report such Observations as shall occur to them, for the better conducting and managing the Business transacted in the said Offices. (Repealed by Statute Law Revision Act 1871 (34 & 35 Vict. c. 116))
Continuance of Laws Act 1787 (repealed)	27 Geo. 3. c. 36	30 May 1787
An Act to continue several Laws relating to the free Importation of certain Raw Hides and Skins from Ireland and the British Plantations in America; to the allowing the Exportation of certain Quantities of Wheat and other Articles to His Majesty's Sugar Colonies in America; to the prohibiting the Exportation of Tools and Utensils made use of in the Iron and Steel Manufactures of this Kingdom, and to prevent the seducing of Artificers and Workmen employed in those Manufactures to go into Parts beyond the Seas; and to the granting a Bounty on the Exportation of certain Species of British and Irish Linens exported, and taking off the Duties on foreign Raw Linen Yarns made of Flax imported. (Repealed by Statute Law Revision Act 1871 (34 & 35 Vict. c. 116))
Pawnbrokers Act 1787 (repealed)	27 Geo. 3. c. 37	28 May 1787
An Act for further regulating the Trade and Business of Pawnbrokers. (Repealed by Statute Law Revision Act 1871 (34 & 35 Vict. c. 116))
Designing and Printing of Linens, etc. Act 1787 (repealed)	27 Geo. 3. c. 38	21 May 1787
An Act for the Encouragement of the Arts of designing and printing Linens, Cottons, Callicoes and Muslins, by vesting the Properties thereof, in the Designers, Printers, and Proprietors for a limited Time. (Repealed by Copyright of Designs Act 1842 (5 & 6 Vict. c. 100))
American Loyalists Act 1787 (repealed)	27 Geo. 3. c. 39	30 May 1787
An Act for appointing Commissioners further to enquire into the Losses and Services of all such Persons who have suffered in their Rights, Properties and Professions during the late unhappy Dissensions in America, in consequence of their Loyalty to His Majesty and Attachment to the British Government. (Repealed by Statute Law Revision Act 1871 (34 & 35 Vict. c. 116))
Indemnity Act 1787 (repealed)	27 Geo. 3. c. 40	28 May 1787
An Act to indemnify such Persons, as have omitted to qualify themselves for Offices and Employments, and to indemnify Justices of the Peace or others, who have omitted to register or deliver in their Qualifications, within the Time limited by Law, and for giving further Time for those Purposes, and to indemnify Members and Officers in Cities, Corporations and Borough Towns, whose Admissions have been omitted to be stamped according to Law, or, having been stamped, have been lost or mislaid, and for allowing them Time to provide Admissions duly stamped, and to give further Time to such Persons as have omitted to make and file Affidavits of the Execution of Indentures of Clerks, to Attornies and Solicitors. (Repealed by Promissory Oaths Act 1871 (34 & 35 Vict. c. 48))
Lotteries Act 1787 (repealed)	27 Geo. 3. c. 41	28 May 1787
An Act for granting to His Majesty, a certain Sum of Money, to be raised by a Lottery. (Repealed by Statute Law Revision Act 1871 (34 & 35 Vict. c. 116))
Papists Act 1787 (repealed)	27 Geo. 3. c. 42	28 May 1787
An Act for allowing further Time for Enrolment of Deeds and Wills made by Papists, and for the Relief of Purchasers. (Repealed by Statute Law Revision Act 1871 (34 & 35 Vict. c. 116))
County Palatine of Chester Act 1787 (repealed)	27 Geo. 3. c. 43	28 May 1787
An Act for taking and swearing Affidavits to be made Use of in the Court of Session of the County Palatine of Chester, and for taking of Special Bail in Actions and Suits depending in the same Court. (Repealed by Statute Law Revision Act 1861 (24 & 25 Vict. c. 101))
Ecclesiastical Suits Act 1787 (repealed)	27 Geo. 3. c. 44	21 May 1787
An Act to prevent frivolous and vexatious Suits in Ecclesiastical Courts. (Repealed by Church Discipline Act 1840 (3 & 4 Vict. c. 86), Ecclesiastical Courts Jurisdiction Act 1860 (23 & 24 Vict. c. 32), Statute Law Revision Act 1871 (34 & 35 Vict. c. 116) and Statute Law Revision Act 1948 (11 & 12 Geo. 6. c. 62))
Margate Improvement Act 1787 (repealed)	27 Geo. 3. c. 45	21 May 1787
An Act for re-building the Pier of Margate in the Isle of Thanet, in the County of Kent, for ascertaining, establishing, and recovering certain Duties in Lieu of the ancient and customary Droits, for the Support and Maintenance of the said Pier, for widening, paving, repairing, cleansing, lighting, and watching the Streets, Lanes, Highways, and Public Passages in the Town of Margate, and Parish of Saint John the Baptist, in the said Isle of Thanet; for settling the Rates of Porters, Chairmen, Carters, and Carmen within the said Town, and for preventing Encroachments, Nuisances, and Annoyances therein. (Repealed by Margate Pier Act 1799 (39 Geo. 3. c. ii), Margate Improvement and Harbour Act 1809 (49 Geo. 3. c. cxvii), Margate Pier and Harbour Company Act 1812 (52 Geo. 3. c. clxxxvi) and County of Kent Act 1981 (c. xviii))
Aberbrothock Beer Duties Act 1787 (repealed)	27 Geo. 3. c. 46	28 May 1787
An Act for continuing the Term of Two Acts made in the Eleventh Year of the Reign of His late Majesty George the Second, (Note: Aberbrothock Beer Duties Act 1737 (11 Geo. 2. c. 4)) and the Third Year of the Reign of His present Majesty, (Note: Aberbrothock Beer Duties Act 1763 (3 Geo. 3. c. 28)) for laying a Duty of Two Pennies Scots, or One-sixth Part of a Penny Sterling, upon every Scots Pint of Ale, and Beer, which shall be brewed for Sale, brought into, vended, tapped, or sold within the Town of Aberbrothock, and Liberties thereof. (Repealed by Statute Law Revision Act 1948 (11 & 12 Geo. 6. c. 62))
Land Tax (Commissioners) Act 1787 (repealed)	27 Geo. 3. c. 47	30 May 1787
An Act for rectifying Mistakes in the Names of several of the Commissioners appointed by an Act made in the last Session of Parliament, (Note: Land Tax (No. 5) Act 1786 (26 Geo. 3. c. 121)) to put in Execution an Act made in the same Session, intituled, "An Act for granting an Aid to His Majesty by a Land Tax to be raised in Great Britain, for the Service of the Year One thousand seven hundred and eighty-six;" (Note: Land Tax Act 1786 (26 Geo. 3. c. 3)) and for appointing other Commissioners, together with those named in the first-mentioned Act, to put in Execution an Act of this Session of Parliament; (Note: Land Tax Act 1787 (27 Geo. 3. c. 5)) for granting an Aid to His Majesty by a Land Tax to be raised in Great Britain, for the Service of the Year One thousand seven hundred and eighty-seven. (Repealed by Statute Law Revision Act 1871 (34 & 35 Vict. c. 116) (Note: Incorrectly cited as "SL(R) 1971" in the Chronological Table of the Statutes.))
East India Company (Warehouses) Act 1787 (repealed)	27 Geo. 3. c. 48	21 May 1787
An Act to enable the East India Company to continue their Warehouses already built, and to build new Warehouses exceeding certain Dimensions freed and discharged from the Regulations and Directions contained in an Act made in the Fourteenth Year of the Reign of His Majesty King George the Third, intituled, "An Act for the further and better Regulation of Buildings and Party-Walls, and for the more effectually preventing Mischiefs by Fire, within the Cities of London and Westminster and the Liberties thereof, and other the Parishes, Precincts, and Places within the Weekly Bills of Mortality, the Parishes of Saint Mary-le-bon, Paddington, Saint Pancras, and Saint Luke, at Chelsea, in the County of Middlesex, and for indemnifying, under certain Conditions, Builders and other Persons against the Penalties to which they are or may be liable, for erecting Buildings within the Limits aforesaid contrary to Law." (Note: Fires Prevention (Metropolis) Act 1774 (14 Geo. 3. c. 79)) (Repealed by Statute Law Revision Act 1950 (14 Geo. 6. c. 6))
Saint James' Parish, Bristol Act 1787	27 Geo. 3. c. 49	21 May 1787
An Act for dividing the Parish of Saint James in the City and County of Bristol, and County of Gloucester, and for building a Church, and providing a Cemetery or Church Yard, and Parsonage House within the new Parish.
Newcastle Theatre Act 1787 (repealed)	27 Geo. 3. c. 50	30 May 1787
An Act to enable His Majesty to licence a Playhouse in the Town and County of the Town of Newcastle-upon-Tyne. (Repealed by Statute Law Revision Act 1948 (11 & 12 Geo. 6. c. 62))
Edinburgh (Improvement) Act 1787 (repealed)	27 Geo. 3. c. 51	30 May 1787
An Act for making a Road from Saint Bernard's Street in the Town of Leith, to the Foot of Leith Walk, in the County of Edinburgh, and for widening and enlarging certain Streets in the City of Edinburgh, and the Avenues leading to the same; and for amending Two several Acts passed, relative to the said City, in the Twenty-fifth (Note: Edinburgh (Streets) Act 1785 (25 Geo. 3. c. 28)) and Twenty-sixth (Note: Edinburgh (Improvement) Act 1786 (26 Geo. 3. c. 113)) Years of His present Majesty's Reign. (Repealed by Edinburgh Municipal and Police Act 1879 (42 & 43 Vict. c. cxxxii) (Note: Incorrectly cited as "42 & 43 Vict. c. cxxii" in the Chronological Table of the Statutes.))
Camberwell (Streets) Act 1787 (repealed)	27 Geo. 3. c. 52	21 May 1787
An Act for better lighting and watching the Village of Camberwell, in the County of Surrey, and certain Roads and other Places adjoining or near thereto. (Repealed by London Government (Borough of Camberwell) Order in Council 1901 (SR&O 1901/213))
Hatfield Chase (Drainage) Act 1787	27 Geo. 3. c. 53	21 May 1787
An Act for better draining and preserving certain Lands and Grounds within the Level of Hatfield Chace and Parts adjacent, in the Counties of York, Lincoln, and Nottingham.
Westminster (Improvement) Act 1787 (repealed)	27 Geo. 3. c. 54	21 May 1787
An Act to render effectual the Purchase of a House situate in the Parish of Saint Luke, Chelsea, in the County of Middlesex, to be used as an additional Workhouse for the Parish of Saint George, Hanover Square, within the Liberty of the City of Westminster, and for other Purposes. (Repealed by London Government (City of Westminster) Order in Council 1901 (SR&O 1901/278))
Forth and Clyde Navigation (No. 2) Act 1787 (repealed)	27 Geo. 3. c. 55	28 May 1787
An Act for altering and extending the Line of the Cut or Canal authorized to be made and maintained by so much of several Acts made in the Eighth, (Note: Forth and Clyde Navigation Act 1768 (8 Geo. 3. c. 63)) Eleventh, (Note: Forth and Clyde Navigation Act 1771 (11 Geo. 3. c. 62)) Thirteenth, (Note: Forth and Clyde Navigation Act 1773 (13 Geo. 3. c. 104)) and Twenty-fourth (Note: Forth and Clyde Navigation Act 1784 (24 Geo. 3. Sess. 2. c. 59)) Years of the Reign of His present Majesty, as authorizes the making and maintaining a navigable Cut or Canal from the Frith or River of Forth at or near the Mouth of the River of Carron in the County of Stirling, to the Frith or River of Clyde at or near a Place called Dalmuir Burnfoot in the County of Dumbarton; and also a collateral Cut from the same to the City of Glasgow; for deepening the said Cut or Canal, and for explaining and amending so much of the said Acts as relates to the making and maintaining the said Cut or Canal. (Repealed by Forth and Clyde Navigation Act 1841 (4 & 5 Vict. c. lv))
River Cart Navigation Act 1787 (repealed)	27 Geo. 3. c. 56	21 May 1787
An Act for enabling the Magistrates and Town Council of Paisley, to improve the Navigation of the River Cart, and to make a Navigable Cut or Canal, across the Turnpike Road leading from Glasgow to Greenock. (Repealed by River Cart Navigation and Paisley Harbour Act 1835 (5 & 6 Will. 4. c. xxxii) and Paisley Corporation (Cart Navigation) Order Confirmation Act 1971 (c. ii))
Dumfries Beer Duties Act 1787 (repealed)	27 Geo. 3. c. 57	28 May 1787
An Act for continuing and amending several Acts, made in the Third Year of the Reign of King George the First, (Note: Dumfries Beer Duties Act 1716 (3 Geo. 1. c. 6)) the Tenth Year of the Reign of King George the Second, (Note: Dumfries Beer Duties Act 1736 (10 Geo. 2. c. 7)) and the Second Year of the Reign of His present Majesty, (Note: Dumfries Beer Duties Act 1762 (2 Geo. 3. c. 55)) for laying a Duty of Two Pennies Scots, or One-sixth Part of a Penny Sterling, on every Pint of Ale or Beer, that shall be vended, or sold, within the Town of Dumfries and Privileges thereof; for paying the Debts of the said Town, and for building a Church and making a Harbour there, and for laying a Duty on the Tonnage of Shipping, and a Duty on Goods imported and exported into and out of the Port of the said Town, for the better repairing of the said Harbour; and for paving, cleansing, lighting, and watching the Streets and other Public Places within the said Town, and widening the Streets where necessary, and removing and preventing Nuisances therein. (Repealed by Statute Law Revision Act 1948 (11 & 12 Geo. 6. c. 62))
Sussex Gaol Act 1787 (repealed)	27 Geo. 3. c. 58	28 May 1787
An Act for vesting the Scite, Buildings, and other the Premises belonging to the Old Gaol, or Prison of the County of Sussex, in Trustees, for the Purpose of conveying the same to the Right Honourable Frances Viscountess Irwin and her Heirs, and to declare the New Gaol or Prison lately built, to be the Common Gaol for the said County. (Repealed by Statute Law (Repeals) Act 2008 (c. 12))
Devon Gaol Act 1787 (repealed)	27 Geo. 3. c. 59	28 May 1787
An Act for making and declaring the Gaol for the County of Devon, called the High Gaol, a Public and Common Gaol, and for discharging Denys Rolle and John Rolle Esquires, and their respective Heirs and Assigns, from the Office of Keeper of the said Gaol, and for improving and enlarging the same, or building a new One, and also for taking down the Chapel in the Castle of Exeter, and for other Purposes therein mentioned. (Repealed by Statute Law (Repeals) Act 2008 (c. 12))
Stafford Gaol Act 1787 (repealed)	27 Geo. 3. c. 60	28 May 1787
An Act for building a new Gaol, and providing a proper Prison for Debtors, and House of Correction, for the several Boroughs, Towns Corporate, Liberties, Franchises, and all other Places within the County of Stafford, and for regulating the same respectively. (Repealed by Statute Law (Repeals) Act 2008 (c. 12))
Grantham Town Hall Act 1787	27 Geo. 3. c. 61	28 May 1787
An Act for taking down the Guild-hall or Town-hall in the Borough of Grantham, in the County of Lincoln, and re-building the same.
Hanley Chapel, Stafford Act 1787	27 Geo. 3. c. 62	28 May 1787
An Act for taking down and re-building the Chapel of Hanley, (Note: St. John the Evangelist, Hanley, Stoke-on-Trent.) in the County of Stafford, for vesting the Right of Nomination in Trustees, and for enlarging the Chapel Yard, and other Purposes.
Saint Mary Church, Wanstead Act 1787	27 Geo. 3. c. 63	28 May 1787
An Act for re-building the Church of the Parish of Saint Mary Wanstede, alias Wanstead, in the County of Essex.
Portsea Chapel Act 1787	27 Geo. 3. c. 64	28 May 1787
An Act for building a new Chapel upon Portsmouth Common, in the Parish of Portsea in the County of Southampton.
Edinburgh College of Surgeons Act 1787 (repealed)	27 Geo. 3. c. 65	28 May 1787
An Act for confirming a Charter or Letters Patent granted by His Majesty, to the Royal College and Corporation of Surgeons, of the City of Edinburgh, so far as relates to a Scheme for raising a Fund for a Provision for the Widows and Children of the Members of the said Corporation, and of their Clerk, with certain Alterations, and for establishing the said Scheme, and impowering the Corporation, and the Trustees and Officers elected for managing the Fund, effectually to carry the said Scheme into Execution. (Repealed by Royal College of Surgeons (Edinburgh) Widows' Fund Act 1813 (53 Geo. 3. c. lxxvi) and Royal College of Surgeons of Edinburgh (Widows Fund) Act 1860 (23 & 24 Vict. c. clxxvi))
Lincoln Drainage Act 1787 (repealed)	27 Geo. 3. c. 66	21 May 1787
An Act for dividing and enclosing the Low Lands and Common Fens within the Hamlet of Martin, in the Parish of Timberland, and within the Parish of Blankney, in the County of Lincoln, and for draining and preserving the Low Lands and Fens within the said Hamlet of Martin, and Parish of Blankney, and within the Hamlet of Linwood, in the said Parish of Blankney. (Repealed by Lincolnshire Fens and Dales Drainage Act 1832 (2 & 3 Will. 4. c. xciv))
Sandwich (Improvement) Act 1787 (repealed)	27 Geo. 3. c. 67	28 May 1787
An Act for the better repairing, paving, cleansing, lighting, and watching the Highways, Streets, and Lanes of and in the Town and Port of Sandwich in the County of Kent, and in the several Parishes of Saint Peter the Apostle, Saint Mary the Virgin, and Saint Clement, in the said Town, Port, and County, and for removing and preventing Encroachments, Nuisances, Obstructions, and Annoyances in the said Highways, Streets, and Lanes, and on the Common Quay belonging to the said Town and Port, and in the Haven adjoining to the said Quay, and the Bridge built over the said Haven; and for regulating the Births and Mooring Places of Vessels at the said Quay, and the proper Times for Vessels to pass through the said Bridge. (Repealed by County of Kent Act 1981 (c. xviii))
Gloucester Roads Act 1787 (repealed)	27 Geo. 3. c. 68	5 March 1787
An Act for more effectually repairing the Roads leading from Mead Brook, which divides the Parishes of Pucklechurch and Mangotsfield in the County of Gloucester, to Christian Malford Bridge in the County of Wilts, and from Pucklechurch aforesaid, to certain Coal Mines in the said Parish. (Repealed by Pucklechurch or Lower District of Roads Act 1831 (1 Will. 4. c. lxii) and Draycot or Upper District Turnpike Road (Wiltshire) Act 1831 (1 Will. 4. c. lxiii))
Epping and Ongar Road Act 1787 (repealed)	27 Geo. 3. c. 69	22 March 1787
An Act for continuing and enlarging the Term and Powers of several Acts made in the Tenth Year of the Reign of King George the First, (Note: Essex Roads Act 1723 (10 Geo. 1. c. 9)) the Sixteenth Year of the Reign of King George the Second, (Note: Epping and Ongar Road Act 1742 (16 Geo. 2. c. 19)) and the Ninth Year of the Reign of His present Majesty, (Note: Epping and Ongar Road Act 1769 (9 Geo. 3. c. 63)) for repairing the Road from the North Part of Harlow Bush Common (Note: Harlow, Essex.) in the Parish of Harlow, to Woodford (Note: Woodford, now in Greater London, historically in Essex.) in the County of Essex; and for repairing and widening the Road from Epping through the Parishes of Northweald Bassett, (Note: North Weald Bassett, Essex.) Bobbingworth, (Note: Bobbingworth, Essex.) High Ongar, (Note: High Ongar, Essex.) Chipping Ongar, (Note: Chipping Ongar, Essex.) and Shelley, (Note: Shelley, Essex.) to the Four Want Way (Note: Now the Four Wantz roundabout, at the junction of the A414 road and the A128 road. 51°42′46″N 0°14′42″E) in the said Parish of Shelley, and from thence through the Parishes of High Ongar and Norton Mandeville (Note: Norton Mandeville, Essex.) to the Parish of Writtle (Note: Writtle, Essex.) in the said County. (Repealed by Road from Harlow Act 1822 (3 Geo. 4. c. xliv))
Kent and Surrey Roads Act 1787 (repealed)	27 Geo. 3. c. 70	22 March 1787
An Act for enlarging the Term of an Act of the Fifth Year of His present Majesty, (Note: Kent and Surrey Roads Act 1765 (5 Geo. 3. c. 68)) for repairing, widening, and keeping in Repair the Road leading from the Turnpike Road at Wrotham Heath in the County of Kent, to the Turnpike Road leading from Croydon to Godstone in the County of Surrey. (Repealed by Wrotham Heath and Croydon and Godstone Road Act 1829 (10 Geo. 4. c. xx))
Lincoln and Nottinghamshire Roads Act 1787 (repealed)	27 Geo. 3. c. 71	22 March 1787
An Act for making, maintaining, and repairing a Road from the West End of the Bridge intended to be built at or near the Ferry over the River Trent, from Gainsborough in the County of Lincoln to the Parish of Saundby in the County of Nottingham, through the several Parishes of Saundby, Beckingham, Bole, North Wheatley, Hayton, and Clareborough, to East Retford, all situate in the said County of Nottingham, with a Side Branch from the Boundary Gate between the said Parishes of Beckingham and Saundby, through the said Parish of Beckingham and the Parish of Gringley on the Hill in the same County to the Town of Gringley on the Hill aforesaid. (Repealed by Road from Gainsborough Bridge (Lincolnshire) Act 1808 (48 Geo. 3. c. xxv) and Roads from Gainsborough Bridge (Lincolnshire, Nottinghamshire) Act 1830 (11 Geo. 4 & 1 Will. 4. c. xxv))
Hurst Green Road Act 1787 (repealed)	27 Geo. 3. c. 72	22 March 1787
An Act for continuing the Term and altering and enlarging the Powers of an Act passed in the Fifth Year of the Reign of His present Majesty, (Note: Hurst Green Road Act 1765 (5 Geo. 3. c. 64)) for repairing, widening, and keeping in Repair the Road leading from the Turnpike Road on Hurst Green (Note: Hurst Green, East Sussex.) in the County of Sussex, through Etchingham (Note: Etchingham, East Sussex.) and Burwash, (Note: Burwash, East Sussex.) to the Extent of the said Parish of Burwash in the said County. (Repealed by Roads from Lewes Act 1830 (11 Geo. 4 & 1 Will. 4. c. lxxxii))
Warwick Worcester and Stafford Roads Act 1787 (repealed)	27 Geo. 3. c. 73	30 March 1787
An Act for continuing the Term of Three Acts of the Thirteenth Year of King George the First, (Note: Birmingham and Wednesbury Roads Act 1726 (13 Geo. 1. c. 14)) the Twenty-first Year of His late Majesty, (Note: Warwick, Stafford and Worcester Roads Act 1747 (21 Geo. 2. c. 20)) and the Twelfth Year of His present Majesty, (Note: Warwick, Stafford and Worcester Roads Act 1772 (12 Geo. 3. c. 110)) so far as the same relate to the Roads from Birmingham through Wednesbury to High Bullen and to Great Bridge, and from, thence to the Port Way at the End of Darlaston Lane next to Bilston, and to Nether Trindle near Dudley in the Counties of Warwick, Worcester, and Stafford; and for making and keeping in Repair a Road from Trouse Lane in the Parish of Wednesbury to Darlaston in the County of Stafford. (Repealed by Birmingham and Wednesbury Roads Act 1832 (2 & 3 Will. 4. c. vi))
Devon Roads Act 1787 (repealed)	27 Geo. 3. c. 74	30 March 1787
An Act to enlarge the Term and Powers of an Act passed in the Fifth Year of the Reign of His present Majesty, (Note: Devon Roads (No. 2) Act 1765 (5 Geo. 3. c. 70)) for repairing and widening the Roads from Keyberry Bridge to the Passage at Shalldon, and from the said Bridge to the Pier or Harbour of Torkey in the County of Devon. (Repealed by Newton Abbott and Torquay Roads Act 1823 (4 Geo. 4. c. xvii))
Brecon Roads Act 1787 (repealed)	27 Geo. 3. c. 75	30 March 1787
An Act for enlarging the Term and Powers of an Act passed in the Seventh Year of the Reign of His present Majesty King George the Third, intituled, "An Act for repairing and widening several Roads in the County of Brecon;" (Note: Brecon Roads Act 1766 (7 Geo. 3. c. 60)) and for amending certain other Roads in the said County. (Repealed by Roads in Brecon, Radnor and Glamorgan Act 1809 (49 Geo. 3. c. xiv))
Nottingham to Mansfield Road Act 1787 (repealed)	27 Geo. 3. c. 76	5 April 1787
An Act for amending, widening, and keeping in repair the Road leading from the Town of Nottingham to the Town of Mansfield in the County of Nottingham. (Repealed by Nottingham and Mansfield Road Act 1828 (9 Geo. 4. c. xxiii))
Gloucester and Oxford Roads Act 1787 (repealed)	27 Geo. 3. c. 77	5 April 1787
An Act for continuing and amending an Act of the Twenty-eight Year of His late Majesty, (Note: Gloucester and Warwick Roads Act 1755 (28 Geo. 2. c. 47)) so far as the same relates to the Roads from the Hand and Post at the Top of Burford Lane (Note: The junction of the A429 Fosse Way and the A424 Burford Road. 51°55′05″N 1°43′31″W) in the County of Gloucester, to Stow on the Wold, (Note: Stow-on-the-Wold.) and from thence to Paddle Brook, (Note: The A429 crosses Paddle Brook near Stretton-on-Fosse. 52°02′11″N 1°40′29″W) and from the Cross Hands on Salford Hill (Note: The Cross Hands Inn, on the A44 Salford Hill between Moreton in Marsh and Chipping Norton.) in the County of Oxford, to the Hand and Post in the Parish of Withington in the County of Gloucester. (Repealed by Burford Lane and Stow-on-the-Wold Roads Act 1824 (5 Geo. 4. c. ix))
Gloucester and Crickley Hill Road Act 1787 (repealed)	27 Geo. 3. c. 78	5 April 1787
An Act for enlarging the Term and Powers of an Act of the First Year of His present Majesty, (Note: Gloucester and Crickley Hill Road Act 1760 (1 Geo. 3. c. 30)) for repairing the Roads from the City of Gloucester (Note: The North Gate of the City of Gloucester, located on Northgate Street, near the junction with St Aldate Street. 51°52′00″N 2°14′39″W) to the Top of Birdlip Hill, (Note: The top of Birlip Hill is in the village of Birdlip, Gloucestershire. 51°49′41″N 2°06′38″W) and from the Foot of the said Hill (Note: The junction of Cirencester Road and Ermin Way. 51°50′23″N 2°08′27″W) to the Top of Crickley Hill. (Note: The location of the former Air Balloon public house, where the A417 meets the A436. 51°50′37″N 2°05′45″W) (Repealed by Gloucester and Crickley Hill Road Act 1806 (46 Geo. 3. c. l))
Roxburgh Roads Act 1787 (repealed)	27 Geo. 3. c. 79	21 May 1787
An Act to enlarge the Term and Powers of an Act made in the Sixth Year of the Reign of His present Majesty, (Note: Berwick Roads Act 1766 (6 Geo. 3. c. 73)) for repairing the Road from the Burgh of Lauder in the Shire of Berwick, to and through Kelso in the Shire of Roxburgh, to the Marchburn. (Repealed by Road from Lauder to Kelso Act 1829 (10 Geo. 4. c. lxvi))
Kent and Sussex Roads (No. 2) Act 1787 (repealed)	27 Geo. 3. c. 80	21 May 1787
An Act for continuing the Term, and varying the Powers of an Act of the Second Year of His present Majesty, (Note: Kent and Sussex Roads Act 1762 (2 Geo. 3. c. 67)) for repairing the Roads from Kipping's Cross, in the County of Kent, to Lamberhurst Pound and Pullens Hill in the said County, and to Flimwell Vent in the County of Sussex; and also for repairing the Road from the Turnpike Gate at Lamberhurst Pound aforesaid, through East Lane and by Hope Mill, to the Turnpike Road at Clay Hill in the Parish of Goudhurst, in the County of Kent. (Repealed by Kipping's Cross and Flimwell Vent Road (Kent and Sussex) Act 1829 (10 Geo. 4. c. xxvi))
Berkshire Oxford Buckinghamshire and Hertford Roads Act 1787 (repealed)	27 Geo. 3. c. 81	21 May 1787
An Act for continuing the Term and varying the Powers of an Act of the Eighth Year of His present Majesty, (Note: Reading and Hatfield Road Act 1768 (8 Geo. 3. c. 50)) for repairing, widening, turning, and altering the Road leading from Reading in the County of Berks, through Henley, in the County of Oxford, and Great Marlow, Chipping Wycombe, Agmondesham, and Cheynes, in the County of Bucks, and Rickmansworth, Watford, and Saint Alban's to Hatfield, in the County of Hertford; and also the Road leading out of the said Road at Marlow over Great Marlow Bridge through Bysham, to or near the Thirty Mile Stone in the Turnpike Road, leading from Maidenhead to Reading. (Repealed by Road from Reading to Hatfield Act 1829 (10 Geo. 4. c. cxxxiii))
Stafford and Worcester Roads Act 1787 (repealed)	27 Geo. 3. c. 82	21 May 1787
An Act for continuing and amending three Acts of the Thirteenth Year of King George the First, the Twenty-first Year of His late Majesty, and the Twelfth Year of His present Majesty, so far as the same relate to the Roads from a Place called the Nether Trindle near Dudley, to Kingswinford, and to the further End of Brittel Lane, within the Counties of Stafford and Worcester, and for making and keeping in repair a Road from or near to the Nether Trindle aforesaid, to Tipton Green in the said Counties. (Repealed by Dudley and Brettell Lane District of Roads Act 1832 (2 & 3 Will. 4. c. lxxxiv))
Stirling Roads Act 1787 (repealed)	27 Geo. 3. c. 83	21 May 1787
An Act to continue the Term, and alter and enlarge the Powers of several Acts made in the Twenty-sixth (Note: Glasgow Roads Act 1753 (26 Geo. 2. c. 90)) and Twenty-seventh (Note: Glasgow Roads Act 1754 (27 Geo. 2. c. 27)) Years of the Reign of His late Majesty King George the Second, and the Sixth Year of the Reign of His present Majesty, (Note: Glasgow Roads Act 1766 (6 Geo. 3. c. 82)) so far as relates to the Road leading from Glasgow to Redburn Bridge, and for altering the Course of the Road from Glasgow to Redburn Bridge, and for repairing the Road from Redburn Bridge to Bonny Water and from thence to or near Loanhead, in the County of Stirling, there to join the Turnpike Road leading from Falkirk to Kilsyth. (Repealed by Road from Glasgow to Redburn Bridge Act 1804 (44 Geo. 3. c. lxv))
Balby to Worksop Road Act 1787 (repealed)	27 Geo. 3. c. 84	21 May 1787
An Act for enlarging the Term and Powers of an Act made in the Fifth Year of the Reign of His present Majesty, intituled, "An Act for amending the Road from the Pinfold in Balby, in the County of York, to Worksop in the County of Nottingham." (Note: Balby to Worksop Road Act 1765 (5 Geo. 3. c. 67)) (Repealed by Balby and Worksop Turnpike Road Act 1828 (9 Geo. 4. c. xlvi))
Salop Roads Act 1787 (repealed)	27 Geo. 3. c. 85	21 May 1787
An Act for continuing the Term and altering and enlarging the Powers of an Act passed in the Twenty-ninth Year of His late Majesty, (Note: Shropshire Roads (No. 2) Act 1756 (29 Geo. 2. c. 64)) for repairing the Roads from Shrewsbury to Preston Brockhurst, to Shawbury, and to Shreyhill in the County of Salop; and for repairing several other Roads in the said County. (Repealed by Road from Shrewsbury to Preston Brockhurst Act 1819 (59 Geo. 3. c. lxxxvi))
Beverley and Kendell House, and Molescroft and Bainton Balk Roads Act 1787 (repealed)	27 Geo. 3. c. 86	21 May 1787
An Act for enlarging the Term and Powers of an Act passed in the Sixth Year of the Reign of His present Majesty, (Note: Beverley and Kendell House, and Molescroft and Bainton Balk Roads Act 1766 (6 Geo. 3. c. 59)) for repairing and widening the Road from Beverley by Molscroft to Kendal House, and from Molscroft to Bainton Balk in the County of York. (Repealed by Beverley and Kendell House, and Molescroft and Bainton Balk Roads Act 1830 (11 Geo. 4 & 1 Will. 4. c. cxxxi))
Derby and Stafford Roads Act 1787 (repealed)	27 Geo. 3. c. 87	21 May 1787
An Act for enlarging the Term and Powers of an Act made in the Sixth Year of the Reign of His present Majesty King George the Third, (Note: Derby and Stafford Roads Act 1766 (6 Geo. 3. c. 79)) for repairing and widening the Road from Ashborne to Sudbury, and from Sudbury to Yoxhall Bridge, and from the Turnpike Road upon Hatton Moor to Tutbury in the Counties of Derby and Stafford. (Repealed by Ashbourne, Hatton Moor, Uttoxeter and Hadley Plain Roads Act 1830 (11 Geo. 4 & 1 Will. 4. c. lxxxix) and Ashbourne, Sudbury and Yoxhall Bridge, and Uttoxeter and Callingwood Plain Turnpike Road Act 1863 (26 & 27 Vict. c. xcviii))
Stafford Roads Act 1787 (repealed)	27 Geo. 3. c. 88	28 May 1787
An Act for enlarging the Term and Powers of an Act passed in the Sixth Year of the Reign of His present Majesty King George the Third, (Note: Stafford Roads (No. 2) Act 1766 (6 Geo. 3. c. 88)) for repairing and widening the Road from High Bridges in the County of Stafford, to Uttoxeter, (Note: Uttoxeter, Staffordshire.) and from Spath (Note: Spath, Staffordshire.) to Hanging Bridge, (Note: Hanging Bridge over the River Dove, Mayfield, Staffordshire. 53°00′34″N 1°45′57″W) and from Tewnall's Lane (Note: Junction of B5014 Litchfield Road and A515 Tewnall's Lane. 52°43′03″N 1°50′35″W) to Yoxhall Bridge (Note: Yoxall Bridge on the A515 Yoxall Road between King's Bromley and Yoxall, Staffordshire. 52°45′27″N 1°48′26″W) in the said County, so far as the same relates to the Two Districts of Road therein described. (Repealed by High Bridges and Uttoxeter, and Spath and Hanging Bridge Roads Act 1828 (9 Geo. 4. c. xxxii))
Berwick Roads Act 1787 (repealed)	27 Geo. 3. c. 89	28 May 1787
An Act for repairing and widening the Road leading from the Borough of Berwick-upon-Tweed by Ayton Bridge and the new Bridge over the Pees or Pass of Cockburnspath to Dunglass Bridge, and also the Roads leading from Billie Causeway and Preston Bridge, to join the said Road at or near Cockburnspath Tower in the County of Berwick. (Repealed by Berwick-upon-Tweed and Dunglas Bridge Road Act 1832 (2 & 3 Will. 4. c. xxxi))
Stafford Roads (No. 2) Act 1787 (repealed)	27 Geo. 3. c. 90	28 May 1787
An Act for enlarging the Term and Powers of an Act passed in the Sixth Year of the Reign of His present Majesty, (Note: Stafford Roads (No. 4) Act 1766 (6 Geo. 3. c. 99)) for repairing and widening the Road from Muckley Corner to Walsall and Wednesbury, and to Leigh Brook and Ocker Hill, and several other Roads in the County of Stafford, so far as the same relates to the Two First Districts of Road therein comprized. (Repealed by Walsall and Muckley Corner Road Act 1830 (11 Geo. 4 & 1 Will. 4. c. cvi))
Stafford Roads (No. 3) Act 1787 (repealed)	27 Geo. 3. c. 91	28 May 1787
An Act for continuing the Term, and altering and enlarging the Powers of an Act of the Sixth Year of His present Majesty, (Note: Stafford Roads (No. 3) Act 1766 (6 Geo. 3. c. 95)) for repairing and widening the Road leading from High Bullen in Wednesbury to the further End of Darlaston Lane next the Portway, and from thence through Bilston to the further End of Gibbet Lane, and several other Roads leading to and from Bilston in the County of Stafford. (Repealed by Bilston Turnpike Roads (Staffordshire) Act 1829 (10 Geo. 4. c. lxxvi))
Stamford and Grantham Road Act 1787 (repealed)	27 Geo. 3. c. 92	28 May 1787
An Act for enlarging the Term and Powers of Two Acts passed in the Twelfth (Note: Stamford and Grantham Road Act 1738 (12 Geo. 2. c. 8)) and Twenty-fourth (Note: Stamford and Grantham Road Act 1750 (24 Geo. 2. c. 3)) Years of the Reign of His late Majesty King George the Second, for repairing the Road between Stamford and Grantham in the County of Lincoln. (Repealed by Road from Foston Bridge (Lincolnshire) Act 1808 (48 Geo. 3. c. lxiii) and Road from Stamford to South Witham Act 1808 (48 Geo. 3. c. cxiii))
Chester Roads Act 1787 (repealed)	27 Geo. 3. c. 93	28 May 1787
An Act for amending and widening the Roads from the City of Chester to the Woodside Ferry in the Township of Birkenhead in the County of Chester, and from the said City to the Assembly House in Parkgate in the Township of Great Neston in the said County, and from Great Neston aforesaid to the said Woodside Ferry, and from the Road leading from the City of Chester to Parkgate aforesaid, to the Road leading from the same City to the said Woodside Ferry. (Repealed by Chester, Neston and Woodside Ferry District of Roads Act 1833 (3 & 4 Will. 4. c. xl))
Southampton and Berkshire Roads Act 1787 (repealed)	27 Geo. 3. c. 94	28 May 1787
An Act to continue the Term, and alter and enlarge the Powers of an Act made in the Sixth Year of the Reign of His present Majesty, (Note: Hants and Berkshire Roads Act 1766 (6 Geo. 3. c. 86)) for repairing and amending the Road from the present Turnpike Road in the Parish of Hursley, in the County of Southampton, through the Borough of Andover, to the Town of Newbury in the County of Berks, and from Newbury to Chilton Pond and Newtown River; and for amending and keeping in Repair the Road from the South End of Bartholomew Street in the said Town of Newbury, to the Turnpike Road at Speenhamland in the said County of Berks. (Repealed by Hursley and Chilton Pond Turnpike Road Act 1828 (9 Geo. 4. c. xlvii))
Milford to Portsmouth Road Act 1787 (repealed)	27 Geo. 3. c. 95	28 May 1787
An Act for reviving, continuing, and enlarging the Term and Powers of an Act passed in the Fourth Year of the Reign of His present Majesty, (Note: Milford to Portsmouth Road Act 1764 (4 Geo. 3. c. 63)) for amending and widening the Road from a Place near the Village of Milford, through Haslemere, to the Portsmouth Road between Lippock and Rake in the several Counties of Surrey, Sussex, and Southampton. (Repealed by Road through Haslemere Act 1808 (48 Geo. 3. c. cxxxviii) and Milford and Haslemere Road Act 1831 (1 Will. 4. c. xxviii))

=== Private acts ===
Short title	Citation	Royal assent
Long title
Wackerbarth's Naturalization Act 1787	27 Geo. 3. c. 1 Pr.	23 February 1787
An Act for naturalizing George Wackerbarth.
Cracoe Inclosure Act 1787	27 Geo. 3. c. 2 Pr.	5 March 1787
An Act for dividing and enclosing several Open Fields, and Stinted Pastures, within the Township of Cracoe in the Parish of Burnsall, in the West Riding of the County of York.
Dedel's Naturalization Act 1787	27 Geo. 3. c. 3 Pr.	5 March 1787
An Act for naturalizing Solomon Dedel.
Keessingland and Covehithe or North Hales (Suffolk) Inclosure Act 1787	27 Geo. 3. c. 4 Pr.	22 March 1787
An Act for dividing and enclosing the Commons and Waste Lands within the Parishes of Kessingland and Covehithe otherwise North Hales in the County of Suffolk.
Goring Inclosure Act 1787	27 Geo. 3. c. 5 Pr.	22 March 1787
An Act for dividing and enclosing the Open Common Fields, Common Meadows, Cow Commons, Linchets, and Pieces or Parcels of Waste Land or other Ground, intermixed with or adjoining to the said Common Fields and Common Meadows, situate in the Parish of Goring in the County of Oxford.
Graff's Naturalization Act 1787	27 Geo. 3. c. 6 Pr.	22 March 1787
An Act for naturalizing Daniel Graff.
Camper's Naturalization Act 1787	27 Geo. 3. c. 7 Pr.	22 March 1787
An Act for naturalizing Peter Everhard Camper.
Chandler's Naturalization Act 1787	27 Geo. 3. c. 8 Pr.	30 March 1787
An Act for naturalizing George Chandler and Maria Chandler.
Hosch's Naturalization Act 1787	27 Geo. 3. c. 9 Pr.	30 March 1787
An Act for naturalizing Peter John Hosch.
Graham's Estate Act 1787	27 Geo. 3. c. 10 Pr.	5 April 1787
An Act for settling and securing certain Parts and Portions of the Lands and Barony of Williamston, the Lands Drumdewan, Lednock, Mansion House of Lednock, and others lying within the County of Perth, to and in Favour of Thomas Graham Esquire, of Balgowan, and the same Series of Heirs, in Fee-Fail, and under the same Conditions and Limitations as are mentioned and contained in a Deed of Entail, made in the Year One Thousand Seven hundred and Twenty-six; and for vesting in the aforesaid Thomas Graham, and his Heirs and Assigns, in Fee-Simple, the Lands and Barony of Blair, Newton of Blair, Lands of Pitmurthly Maws, and others lying within the aforesaid County of Perth, and County of Forfar.
Fawkener's Divorce Act 1787	27 Geo. 3. c. 11 Pr.	5 April 1787
An Act to dissolve the Marriage of William Fawkener Esquire with Georgiana Ann Poyntz his now Wife, and to enable him to marry again; and for other Purposes therein mentioned.
Coggs Inclosure Act 1787	27 Geo. 3. c. 12 Pr.	5 April 1787
An Act for dividing and enclosing the Open and common Fields, common Meadows, common Pastures, Commons, Waste, and other commonable Lands within the Manor and Parish of Coggs, in the County of Oxford.
Spofforth Inclosure Act 1787	27 Geo. 3. c. 13 Pr.	5 April 1787
An Act for dividing and enclosing the Open arable Fields, Meadows, Pastures, Commons, and Waste Grounds within the Township of Spofforth, in the Parish of Spofforth in the County of York.
Hertel's Naturalization Act 1787	27 Geo. 3. c. 14 Pr.	5 April 1787
An Act for naturalizing John Jacob Hertel.
Rolt's Estate Act 1787	27 Geo. 3. c. 15 Pr.	25 April 1787
An Act for discharging divers Manors, Lands, Tenements, and Hereditaments belonging to Sir Edward Bayntun Rolt Baronet, and Andrew Bayntun Rolt Esquire, from a certain Limitation contained in an Indenture of Release, bearing Date the Twenty-second Day of August One thousand seven hundred and seventy-seven.
West Harptree Inclosure Act 1787	27 Geo. 3. c. 16 Pr.	25 April 1787
An Act for dividing and enclosing the Commons and Waste Lands within the Parish of West Harptree, otherwise West Harptry in the County of Somerset.
Earl Cholmondeley's Estate Act 1787	27 Geo. 3. c. 17 Pr.	21 May 1787
An Act for vesting Part of the settled Estates of the Right Honourable George James Earl Cholmondeley, in the County of Chester, in the said Earl Cholmondeley in Fee-simple; and for settling an Estate of greater Value in the same County, in Lieu thereof.
Dillingham's Estate Act 1787	27 Geo. 3. c. 18 Pr.	21 May 1787
An Act for vesting certain Estates in the Counties of Bedford, Northampton, Essex, Middlesex, and Cambridge, devised by the Will of Theophilus Dillingham Esquire, deceased, in Dillingham Brampton Gurdon Dillingham Esquire, and his Heirs, and for settling another Estate of greater Value in the County of Norfolk, to the same Uses as the devised Estates now stand limited.
Bowles' Estate Act 1787	27 Geo. 3. c. 19 Pr.	21 May 1787
An Act for discharging certain Manors, Messuages, Lands, Tenements, and Hereditaments, in the several Counties of Kent, Surrey, Middlesex, and Berks, Part of the Estate of Oldfield Bowles Esquire, from the Uses, Estates, and Trusts, declared concerning the same in and by the Settlement made previous to the Marriage of the said Oldfield Bowles with Mary his now Wife; and for settling the Manor of North Aston and other Lands and Hereditaments in the County of Oxford, of greater Value, in Lieu thereof, to the like Uses.
Jesus Hospital Estate Act 1787	27 Geo. 3. c. 20 Pr.	21 May 1787
An Act for vesting the Tythes and Estate at Orton in the County of Northampton, belonging to Jesus Hospital in the same County, in John Peach Hungerford Esquire, for his Life, with Remainders over; and for settling a Rent Charge out of the said Estate and other Hereditaments of the said John Peach Hungerford at Orton aforesaid, in Lieu thereof.
Foley's Divorce Act 1787	27 Geo. 3. c. 21 Pr.	21 May 1787
An Act to dissolve the Marriage of the Honourable Edward Foley with the Right Honourable Lady Ann Coventry, his now Wife, and for other Purposes.
Bitteswell Inclosure Act 1787	27 Geo. 3. c. 22 Pr.	21 May 1787
An Act for dividing and enclosing the Open and Common Fields and Commonable Places in the Parish of Bitteswell in the County of Leicester.
Trowell (Nottinghamshire): confirmation of agreement for dividing, inclosing and exchanging lands and other estates, and uniting the two halves (medieties) of the rectory of the parish church.	27 Geo. 3. c. 23 Pr.	21 May 1787
An Act to confirm an Agreement for dividing, enclosing, and exchanging the Lands and other Estates within the Lordship of Trowell in the County of Nottingham; and for uniting the Two Medieties of the Rectory of the Parish Church of Trowell aforesaid.
Kirkbymalzeard Inclosure Act 1787	27 Geo. 3. c. 24 Pr.	21 May 1787
An Act for dividing and enclosing certain Moors, Commons, or Waste Grounds in the Parish of Kirkbymalzeard in the County of York.
Barrow-upon-Trent Inclosure Act 1787	27 Geo. 3. c. 25 Pr.	21 May 1787
An Act for dividing and enclosing the several Common and Open Fields, Meadows, Pastures, Commons, and Waste Grounds, within the Manor and Hamlet of Barrow-upon-Trent in the Parish of Barrow-upon-Trent in the County of Derby.
Dorrington Inclosure Act 1787	27 Geo. 3. c. 26 Pr.	21 May 1787
An Act for dividing and enclosing certain Open and Common Fields, Meadows, Pastures, Fens, and Waste Lands, within the Parish of Dorrington in the County of Lincoln.
Sarsden, Churchill and Shipton-under-Wychwood (Oxfordshire) Inclosure Act 1787	27 Geo. 3. c. 27 Pr.	21 May 1787
An Act for dividing and enclosing the Common Fields, Common Pastures, Common Meadows, Common Grounds, and Waste Grounds, in the Parishes of Sarsden and Churchill and Tything of Lyneham, Merriscourt, and Finescourt, in the Parish of Shipton under Whichwood in the County of Oxford.
Hippius's Naturalization Act 1787	27 Geo. 3. c. 28 Pr.	21 May 1787
An Act for naturalizing Frederick Hippius.
Archbishop of York's Estate Act 1787	27 Geo. 3. c. 29 Pr.	28 May 1787
An Act for vesting the Estates in the County of York, and also the Heir Looms devised and bequeathed by the Will of the Honourable and Most Reverend Robert late Lord Archbishop of York, in Trustees to be sold, and for laying out the Monies to arise from such Sales in the Purchase of Estates to be settled to the same Uses.
Salusbury's Estate Act 1787	27 Geo. 3. c. 30 Pr.	28 May 1787
An Act for rendering valid and effectual the Powers of Sale and Exchange inserted in the Settlement made on the Marriage of Robert Salusbury Esquire with Katharine his Wife.
Simpson's Estate Act 1787	27 Geo. 3. c. 31 Pr.	28 May 1787
An Act for vesting Part of the Estates late of William Simpson Esquire, in the Counties of York, Lincoln, and Nottingham, in Trustees, to be sold, and for laying out the Money arising by such Sale in the Purchase of other Lands and Hereditaments to be settled, in Lieu thereof, to the same Uses.
Lastingham Inclosure Act 1787	27 Geo. 3. c. 32 Pr.	28 May 1787
An Act for dividing and enclosing the Common Fields within the Township of Lastingham in the North Riding of the County of York.
Milwich Inclosure Act 1787	27 Geo. 3. c. 33 Pr.	28 May 1787
An Act for dividing and enclosing the Commons and Waste Grounds within the Manor or reputed Manor and Parish of Milwich in the County of Stafford.
Steeton and Eastburn (Kildwick, Yorkshire) Inclosure Act 1787	27 Geo. 3. c. 34 Pr.	28 May 1787
An Act for allotting, dividing, and enclosing the several Moors, Commons, and Waste Grounds within the Manor or Manors, and Township or Townships of Steeton and Eastburn, in the Parish of Kildwick, in the County of York.
Sawley Inclosure Act 1787	27 Geo. 3. c. 35 Pr.	28 May 1787
An Act for dividing and enclosing the several Open Fields, Common Meadows, Common Pastures, and Waste Grounds within or belonging to the Hamlet of Sawley in the County of Derby.
Little Eaton Inclosure Act 1787	27 Geo. 3. c. 36 Pr.	28 May 1787
An Act for dividing and enclosing the Common Open Fields, Commonable Lands, and Waste Grounds in the Liberty of Little Eaton, within the Manor of Little Chester, in the County of Derby.
Melbourne and King's Newton (Derbyshire) Inclosure Act 1787	27 Geo. 3. c. 37 Pr.	28 May 1787
An Act for dividing and enclosing the several Commons and Open Fields, Meadows, Pastures, Commons, and Waste Grounds within the Liberties of Melbourne and King's Newton, in the Parish and Lordship of Melbourne, in the County of Derby.
Uttoxeter Inclosure Act 1787	27 Geo. 3. c. 38 Pr.	28 May 1787
An Act for enclosing and leasing or letting certain Commons or Waste Grounds lying within the Township or Constablewick of Uttoxeter in the County of Stafford, called the High Wood and the Heath, and applying the Profits thereof in Aid of the Poor's Rate or other Taxes or public Expences within the said Township or Constablewick, and within the Constablewick of the Rectory of Uttoxeter.
Homeyer's Naturalization Act 1787	27 Geo. 3. c. 39 Pr.	28 May 1787
An Act for naturalizing William Homeyer.
Ratcliffe-upon-Trent Inclosure Act 1787	27 Geo. 3. c. 40 Pr.	30 May 1787
An Act for dividing and enclosing the Open Fields, Meadows, Pastures, Commons, and Waste Grounds, lying within the Parish of Ratcliffe-upon-Trent, in the County of Nottingham.
Cropwell Butler and Cropwell Bishop (Nottinghamshire) Inclosure Act 1787	27 Geo. 3. c. 41 Pr.	30 May 1787
An Act for dividing and enclosing the Open Fields, Meadows, Pastures, Commons, and Waste Grounds, in the Lordship or Liberty of Cropwell Butler, and a certain Inter-common Field, and Meadow, called the Fern Field and Great Meadow, lying intermixed in the said Lordship and the Lordship of Cropwell Bishop, in the County of Nottingham.

=== Sources ===
- Pickering, Danby, ed. (1787). "Anno vicesimo septimo Georgi III". The Statutes at Large. Vol. 36. Cambridge: John Archdeacon. p. 1-304 – via Google Books.
- Journals of the House of Commons. Vol. 42. London: His Majesty's Stationery Office. 1803. pp. 3–859 – via Google Books.
- Journal of the House of Lords. Vol. 37: 1783-1787. London: His Majesty's Stationery Office. 1830. pp. 578–761 – via British History Online.
- Chronological Table of and Index to the Statutes. Vol. 1: To the End of the Session 59 Vict. Sess. 2 (1895) (13th ed.). London: Her Majesty's Stationery Office. 1896. p. 147 – via Google Books.
- "Acts of the Parliament of Great Britain from 1787". legislation.gov.uk. The National Archives.
- Chronological Table of the Statutes: Covering the Period from 1235 to the End of 1971. London: Her Majesty's Stationery Office. 1972. pp. 170–171. ISBN 978-0-11-840096-1 – via Google Books.

== See also ==
- List of acts of the Parliament of Great Britain
