= Glass Duties Act 1838 =

Act of the Parliament of the United Kingdom

- Act of Parliament
- Parliament of the United Kingdom
- Long title: An Act to consolidate and amend the Laws for collecting and securing the Duties of Excise on Glass.
- Citation: 1 & 2 Vict. c. 44
- Territorial extent: United Kingdom

Dates
- Royal assent: 27 July 1838
- Commencement: 1 August 1838 (Note: Section 94.)
- Repealed: 9 August 1874
Other legislation
Amends	See § Repealed enactments
Repeals/revokes	See § Repealed enactments
Repealed by	Statute Law Revision Act 1874 (No. 2)

Status: Repealed

Text of statute as originally enacted

The Glass Duties Act 1838 (1 & 2 Vict. c. 44) was an act of the Parliament of the United Kingdom that consolidated enactments related to glass tax.

== Provisions ==
=== Repealed enactments ===
Section 93 of the act repealed 24 enactments, listed in that section.

Citation	Short title	Description	Extent of repeal
19 Geo. 2. c. 12	National Debt Act 1745	An Act passed in the Nineteenth Year of the Reign of His Majesty King George the Second, intituled An Act for granting to His Majesty several Rates and Duties upon Glass and upon spirituous Liquors, and for raising a certain Sum of Money by Annuities and a Lottery, to be charged on the said Rates and Duties, andfor obviating some Doubts about making out Orders at the Exchequerfor the Monies advanced upon the Credit of the Salt Duties granted and continued to His Majesty by an Act of the last Session of Parliament.	So far as the same relate to Duties of Excise on Glass, or contain any Regulations for collecting, managing, or securing the Duties en Glass, but no further.
17 Geo. 3. c. 39	Taxation (No. 2) Act 1776	An Act passed in the Seventeenth Year of the Reign of His Majesty King George the Third, intituled An Act for granting to His Majesty a Duty upon all Servants retained or employed in the several Capacities therein mentioned, and for repealing several Rates and Duties upon Glass imposed by an Act made in the Nineteenth Year of the Reign of His late Majesty, and for granting to His Majesty other Rates and Duties upon Glass in lieu thereof, and for the better collecting the Duties upon Glass, and for repealing the several Rates and Duties charged by an Act made in the Twenty-ninth Year of the Reign ofHis said late Majesty upon all Persons and Bodies Politic and Corporate having certain Quantities of Silver Plate.	So far as the same relate to Duties of Excise on Glass, or contain any Regulations for collecting, managing, or securing the Duties en Glass, but no further.
26 Geo. 3. c. 77	Excise (No. 5) Act 1786	An Act passed in the Twenty-sixth Year of the Reign of His Majesty King George the Third, intituled An Act to limit a Time for the Repayment of the Duties on Male Servants and Carriages by the Commissioners of Excise, and also on Horses, Waggons, Wains, and Carts by the Commissioners of Stamps; and for the Amendment of several Laws relating to the Duties under the Management of the Commissioners of Excise.	So far as the same relate to Duties of Excise on Glass, or contain any Regulations for collecting, managing, or securing the Duties en Glass, but no further.
27 Geo. 3. c. 28	Glass Duties Act 1787	An Act passed in the Twenty-seventh Year of the Reign of His Majesty King George the Third, intituled An Act for granting to His Majesty certain Duties on Glass imported into Great Britain, and for altering the Mode of charging the Duties on Glass made in Great Britain.	The whole act.
28 Geo. 3. c. 37	Excise Act 1788	An Act passed in the Twenty-eighth Year of the Reign of His Majesty King George the Third, intituled An Act for repealing the Duties of Buck or Deer Skins undressed, Buck or Deer Skins, Indian half-dressed, and Elk Skins undressed, imported, and on Hides and Skins dressed in Oil in this Kingdom, andfor granting other Duties in lieu thereof; for laying a Duty on Stuffs printed, painted, stained, or dyed in Great Britain ; allowing Deer and other Skins the Produce of Florida to be sold by Auction free from the Duty charged on such Sales; for amending several Laws relative to the Revenue ofExcise, and to prevent the Sale of Sweets for Consumption in the Houses of Retailers thereof, who shall have not have Licences to sell Beer or Ale.	So far as the same relate to Duties of Excise on Glass, or contain any Regulations for collecting, managing, or securing the Duties en Glass, but no further.
32 Geo. 3. c. 40	Excise Laws, Glass Act 1792	An Act passed in the Thirty-second Year of the Reign of His Majesty King George the Third, intituled An Act for amending the Laws of Excise relating to the Manufactory of Flint Glass.	The whole act.
34 Geo. 3. c. 27	Glass Duties Act 1794	An Act passed in the Thirty-fourth Year of the Reign of His Majesty King George the Third, intituled An Act for granting to His Majesty certain additional Duties on Glass imported into or made in Great Britain.	The whole act.
35 Geo. 3. c. 114	Duties on Glass Act 1795	An Act passed in the Thirty-fifth Year of the Reign of His Majesty King George the Third, intituled An Act for better securing the Duties on Glass.	The whole act.
45 Geo. 3. c. 30	Excise Act 1805	An Act passed in the Forty-fifth Year of the Reign of His Majesty King George the Third, inti- tuled An Act for granting to His Majesty several additional Duties of Excise in Great Britain.	So far as the same relate to Duties of Excise on Glass, or contain any Regulations for collecting, managing, or securing the Duties en Glass, but no further.
47 Geo. 3. Sess. 2. c. 30	Exportation Act (No. 2) 1807	An Act passed in the Second Session of Parliament, in the Forty-seventh Year of the Reign of His Majesty King George the Third, intituled An Act to amend several Laws of Excise in Great Britain relating to the Duties on Salt, Soap, Paper, Coffee, Cocoa Nuts, Spirits, and Glass, and for restoring Seizures in certain Cases.	So far as the same relate to Duties of Excise on Glass, or contain any Regulations for collecting, managing, or securing the Duties en Glass, but no further.
49 Geo. 3. c. 63	Excise Act 1809	An Act passed in the Forty-ninth Year of the Reign of His Majesty King George the Third, intituled An Act for repealing the Duties on the Materials used in making Spread Window Glass and Crown Glass, andfor granting other Duties in lieu thereof, and for the better Collection of the said Duties.	The whole act.
51 Geo. 3. c. 69	Duties on Glass Act 1811	An Act passed in the Fifty-first Year of the Reign of His Majesty King George the Third, intituled An Act for repealing the Duty on the Materials used in making Flint and Phial Glass, and for granting until the First Day of August One thousand eight hundred and twelve other Duties in lieu thereof, and for continuing and amending an Act passed in the Forty-ninth Year of His Majesty's Reign, intituled An Act for repealing the Duties on the Materials used in making Spread Window Glass ' and Crown Glass, and for granting other Duties in lieu thereof, and for the better Collection of the said Duties.	The whole act.
52 Geo. 3. c. 77	Drawback, etc., on Glass Act 1812	An Act passed in the Fifty-second Year of the Reign of His Majesty King George the Third, intituled An Act for granting an additional Drawback on Flint, Phial, and Crown Glass ; for charging an additional countervailing Duty on Flint and Crown Glass imported from Ireland, andfor the better Prevention of Frauds in the Exportation of Glass on Drawback.	The whole act.
54 Geo. 3. c. 97	Duties on Glass (Great Britain) Act 1814	An Act passed in the Fifty-fourth Year of the Reign of His Majesty King George the Third, intituled An Act to continue until the First Day ofAugust One thousand eight hundred and fifteen several Laws relating to the Duties on Glass made in Great Britain ; for granting an Excise Duty on common Glass Bottles imported ; and for the further Prevention of Frauds in the Exportation of Glass.	So far as the same relate to Duties of Excise on Glass, or contain any Regulations for collecting, managing, or securing the Duties en Glass, but no further.
55 Geo. 3. c. 113	Duties, etc., on Glass, etc. Act 1815	An Act passed in the Fifty-fifth Year of the Reign of His Majesty King George the Third, intituled An Act for altering certain Drawbacks and countervailing Duties on Glass, for exempting Irish Glass Bottles from the Duty imposed by an Act of the last Session of Parliament, and for exempting the Leather and Glass of Carriages belonging to certain Persons imported from Ireland for private Use from Duty.	So far as the same relate to Duties of Excise on Glass, or contain any Regulations for collecting, managing, or securing the Duties en Glass, but no further.
56 Geo. 3. c. 108	Excise (No. 3) Act 1816	An Act passed in the Fifty-sixth Year of the Reign of King George the Third, intituled An Act to repeal certain Drawbacks and countervailing Duties of Excise on Beer and Malt; to alter the Drawbacks on Plate Glass, and to prevent Frauds therein.	So far as the same relate to Duties of Excise on Glass, or contain any Regulations for collecting, managing, or securing the Duties en Glass, but no further.
58 Geo. 3. c. 33	Glass Duties Act 1818	An Act passed in the Fifty-eighth Year of the Reign of His Majesty King George the Third, intituled An Act to alter the Allowance for broken Plate Glass, and to exempt Manufacturers of certain Glass Wares from Penalties for not being licensed.	So far as the same relate to Duties of Excise on Glass, or contain any Regulations for collecting, managing, or securing the Duties en Glass, but no further.
59 Geo. 3. c. 104	Excise (No. 4) Act 1819	An Act passed in the Fifty-ninth Year of the Reign of His Majesty King George the Third, intituled An Act to continue until the Fifth Day of July One thousand eight hundred and twenty certain Laws of Excise with regard to Crown Glass, and Flint and Phial Glass, and to alter certain Laws with regard to Flint Glass.	The whole act.
59 Geo. 3. c. 115	Duties on Glass (Great Britain) Act 1819	Another Act passed in the same Fifty-ninth Year of the Reign of His Majesty King George the Third, intituled An Act to repeal the Duties and Drawbacks of Excise on Plates or Sheets of Plate Glass, and to impose other Duties and allow other Drawbacks in lieu thereof.	The whole act.
6 Geo. 4. c. 117	Duties on Glass, etc. Act 1825	An Act passed in the Sixth Year of the Reign of His Majesty King George the Fourth, intituled An Act to repeal the Excise Duties and Drawbacks on Flint Glass in Great Britain, and to impose other Duties and another Drawback in lieu thereof throughout the United Kingdom, and to continue the Jurisdiction and Powersfor recovering Penalties under Customs and Excise Laws in Ireland, untilfurther Provision can be made.	The whole act.
7 & 8 Geo. 4. c. 40	Glass Duties Act 1827	An Act passed in the Seventh and Eighth Years of the Reign of His Majesty King George the Fourth, intituled An Act to continue until the Tenth Day of October One thousand eight hundred and thirty an Act relating to Duties of Excise on Crown, Flint, and Phial Glass, and to alter certain Laws of Excise relating to Flint Glass.	The whole act.
9 Geo. 4. c. 48	Duties on Glass Act 1828	An Act passed in the Ninth Year of the Reign of His Majesty King George the Fourth, intituled An Act to repeal the Excise Duties and Drawbacks on Plate Glass, Broad Glass, Crown Glass, Bottle Glass, and Glass Bottles, payable in Great Britain and Ireland respectively, and to impose other Duties and to grant other Drawbacks in lieu thereof throughout the United Kingdom, and to make perpetual and extend to the United King- dom several Acts relating to certain Duties on Glass.	The whole act.
2 & 3 Will. 4. c. 102	Glass Duties Act 1832	An Act passed in the Second and Third Years of the Reign of His late Majesty King William the Fourth, intituled An Act to repeal the Excise Duties on Flint Glass, and to impose other Duties in lieu thereof, and to amend the Laws relating to Glass.	The whole act.
5 & 6 Will. 4. c. 77	Glass Duties Act 1835	An Act passed in the Fifth and Sixth Years of the Reign of His said late Majesty, intituled An Act to repeal the Duty and Drawback on Flint Glass, and to impose other Duties and another Drawback in lieu thereof, and to reduce the Drawback on German Sheet Glass exported in Panes, and to repeal the Drawback on unground and unpolished Plate Glass, and to amend the Laws relating to the Duties on Glass.	The whole act.

== Subsequent developments ==
The whole act was repealed by section 1 of, and the schedule to, the Statute Law Revision Act 1874 (No. 2) (37 & 38 Vict. c. 96), which came into force on 9 August 1844.
