= Hatfield and Reading Turnpike =

English turnpike road

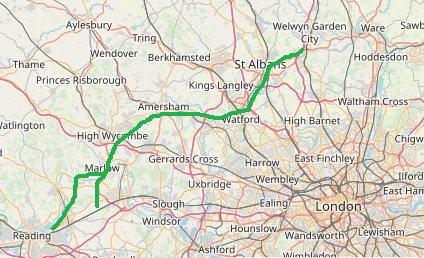
Route of the Hatfield and Reading Turnpike on a modern map of the area.

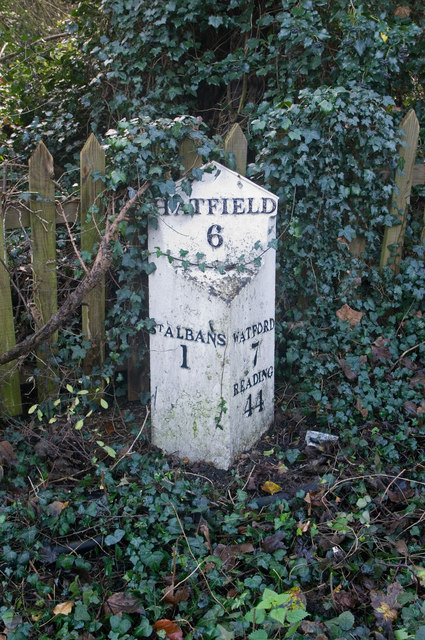
A cast iron milepost in St Stephen's Hill, St Albans placed by the Hatfield and Reading Turnpike Trust about 1820

The Hatfield and Reading Turnpike, nicknamed the Gout Track, was an English turnpike road created in the 1760s to provide a route that connected the Great North Road (the modern A1) with the Holyhead Road (A5) and the Bath Road (A4). It had the advantage that it made it possible for travellers to avoid congested London and was shorter in distance. In 1881 it was one of the last of the turnpikes to have its tolls removed.

== Founding ==
Reading and Hatfield Road Act 1768
- Act of Parliament
- Parliament of Great Britain
- Long title: An Act for repairing, widening, turning, and altering, the Road leading from Reading, in the County of Berks, through Henley, in the County of Oxford; and Great Marlow, Chipping Wycombe, Agmondesham, and Cheynes, in the County of Bucks; and Rickmansworth, Watford, and Saint Albans, to Hatfield, in the County of Hertford; and also the Road leading out of the Said Road at Marlow, over Great Marlow Bridge, through Bysham, to or near the Thirty mile Stone in the Turnpike Road leading from Maidenhead to Reading.
- Citation: 8 Geo. 3. c. 50
- Territorial extent: Great Britain

Dates
- Royal assent: 8 March 1768
- Commencement: 24 November 1767 (Note: Start of session.)
- Repealed: 29 June 1829
Other legislation
Repealed by	Road from Reading to Hatfield Act 1829

Status: Repealed

Text of statute as originally enacted

It is said that the Marquis of Salisbury, who lived at Hatfield House, wanted a route to the Great West Road avoiding central London, for onward travel to the spa towns of Bath and Cheltenham where, as a sufferer of gout, he often took the waters. This would also spare him the discomfort and congestion of London's cobbled streets. With others (including the Earl of Essex, who suffered from a similar affliction, and who lived at Cassiobury House near Watford) he sponsored an act of Parliament passed in 1757 for the building of a road from Hatfield to Reading. The Reading and Hatfield Turnpike Trust was set up by a further act of Parliament, the Reading and Hatfield Road Act 1768 (8 Geo. 3. c. 50), to improve the route between the two towns. It ran via St Albans, Watford, Rickmansworth, Amersham, High Wycombe and Marlow, with two alternative routes south and west from there, one to Knowl Hill (on the Great West Road between Maidenhead and Reading) and the other to Reading itself via Henley-on-Thames. The Trust lasted until 1881, and at that date was one of the last surviving Turnpike Trusts in the country. For many years the route was known as the Gout Track, given its reputed raison-d'etre.

Analysis of toll receipts shows that traffic was lighter than that on the great trunk routes it interconnected. Nevertheless, it stimulated the local economies along its route in trades like farriers, foraging and inn keeping.

== Modern successor routes ==
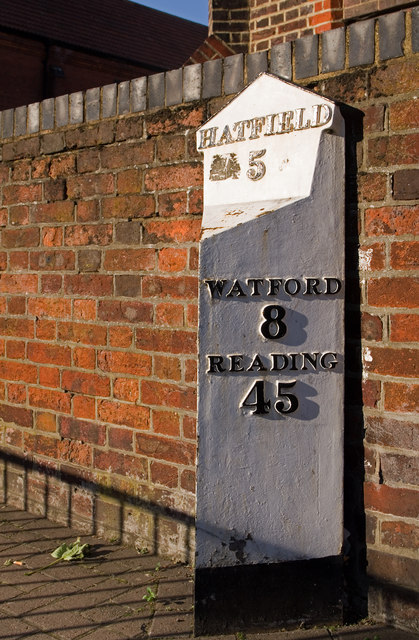
Hatfield and Reading Turnpike Trust milestone on Hatfield Road St Albans..

On classification by the newly formed Ministry of Transport in 1922, it formed parts of the A414 (Hatfield - St Albans), A412 (St Albans - Watford - Rickmansworth), A404 (Rickmansworth - Amersham), A416 (Amersham - High Wycombe - Marlow - Knowl Hill) and A32 (Marlow - Henley - Reading). In 1935, the A404 was extended along the A416 section between Amersham and the A4 to make it easier for those who wanted to use the route for its original function, while the A32 section through Henley was renumbered the A4155.

South of Marlow the turnpike had two alternate routes -

- one to Knowl Hill (former terminus of A404) on the A4 to the west of Maidenhead with part now the unclassified Burchett's Green Road.
- or another via Henley-on-Thames to Reading (now the A4155).
