= List of acts of the Parliament of Great Britain from 1768 =

This is a complete list of acts of the Parliament of Great Britain for the year 1768.

For acts passed until 1707, see the list of acts of the Parliament of England and the list of acts of the Parliament of Scotland. See also the list of acts of the Parliament of Ireland.

For acts passed from 1801 onwards, see the list of acts of the Parliament of the United Kingdom. For acts of the devolved parliaments and assemblies in the United Kingdom, see the list of acts of the Scottish Parliament, the list of acts of the Northern Ireland Assembly, and the list of acts and measures of Senedd Cymru; see also the list of acts of the Parliament of Northern Ireland.

The number shown after each act's title is its chapter number. Acts are cited using this number, preceded by the year(s) of the reign during which the relevant parliamentary session was held; thus the Union with Ireland Act 1800 is cited as "39 & 40 Geo. 3. c. 67", meaning the 67th act passed during the session that started in the 39th year of the reign of George III and which finished in the 40th year of that reign. Note that the modern convention is to use Arabic numerals in citations (thus "41 Geo. 3" rather than "41 Geo. III"). Acts of the last session of the Parliament of Great Britain and the first session of the Parliament of the United Kingdom are both cited as "41 Geo. 3".

Acts passed by the Parliament of Great Britain did not have a short title; however, some of these acts have subsequently been given a short title by acts of the Parliament of the United Kingdom (such as the Short Titles Act 1896).

Before the Acts of Parliament (Commencement) Act 1793 came into force on 8 April 1793, acts passed by the Parliament of Great Britain were deemed to have come into effect on the first day of the session in which they were passed. Because of this, the years given in the list below may in fact be the year before a particular act was passed.

== 8 Geo. 3 ==
The seventh session of the 12th Parliament of Great Britain, which met from 24 November 1767 until 10 March 1768.

This session was also traditionally cited as 8 G. 3, 8 Geo. 3. Sess. 1 or 8 G. 3. Sess. 1.

=== Public acts ===
| Short title | Citation | Royal assent |
Long title
| Exportation and Importation Act 1768 (repealed) | 8 Geo. 3. c. 1 | 7 December 1767 |
An Act to continue and amend an Act, made in the last Session of Parliament, (Note: Importation and Exportation (No. 6) Act 1766 (7 Geo. 3. c. 3)) to prohibit, for a limited Time, the Exportation of Corn, Grain, Meal, Malt, Flour, Bread, Biscuit, and Starch, and also the Extraction of Low Wines and Spirits, from Wheat and Wheat Flour. (Repealed by Statute Law Revision Act 1867 (30 & 31 Vict. c. 59))
| Exportation and Importation (No. 2) Act 1768 (repealed) | 8 Geo. 3. c. 2 | 7 December 1767 |
An Act to continue several Acts, made in the last Session of Parliament, for allowing the Importation of Wheat, Wheat Flour, Barley, Barley Meal, Pulse, Oats, Oatmeal, Rye, and Rye Meal, Duty-free; and also so much of an Act, made in the same Session, (Note: Importation (No. 8) Act 1766 (7 Geo. 3. c. 30)) as relates to the free Importation of Rice from His Majesty's Colonies in North America, and to allow the Importation of Wheat and Wheat Flour from Africa, for a limited Time, free of Duty. (Repealed by Statute Law Revision Act 1867 (30 & 31 Vict. c. 59))
| Exportation and Importation (No. 3) Act 1768 (repealed) | 8 Geo. 3. c. 3 | 21 December 1767 |
An Act for the Free Importation of Indian Corn, or Maize, from any of His Majesty's Colonies in America, for a Time therein limited. (Repealed by Statute Law Revision Act 1867 (30 & 31 Vict. c. 59))
| Malt Duties Act 1768 (repealed) | 8 Geo. 3. c. 4 | 21 December 1767 |
An Act for continuing, and granting to His Majesty, certain Duties upon Malt, Mum, Cyder, and Perry, for the Service of the Year One thousand seven hundred and sixty-eight. (Repealed by Statute Law Revision Act 1867 (30 & 31 Vict. c. 59))
| Highways Act 1768 (repealed) | 8 Geo. 3. c. 5 | 21 December 1767 |
An Act to explain, amend, and render more effectual, an Act passed in the Seventh Year of His present Majesty's Reign, intituled, "An Act to explain, amend, and reduce into One Act of Parliament, the several Statutes now in being, for the amendment, and Preservation of the Public Highways of this Kingdom; and for other Purposes therein mentioned." (Note: Highways (No. 2) Act 1766 (7 Geo. 3. c. 42)) (Repealed by Statute Law Revision Act 1867 (30 & 31 Vict. c. 59))
| Indemnity Act 1768 (repealed) | 8 Geo. 3. c. 6 | 21 December 1767 |
An Act to indemnify such Persons as have. omitted to qualify themselves for Offices and Employments within the Time limited by Law, and for allowing further Time for that Purpose; and to indemnifying Members and Officers in Cities, Corporations, and Borough Towns, whose Admissions have been omitted to be stamped according to Law, or, having been stamped, have been lost or mislaid; and for allowing them Time to provide Admissions duly stamped. (Repealed by Statute Law Revision Act 1867 (30 & 31 Vict. c. 59))
| Mutiny Act 1768 (repealed) | 8 Geo. 3. c. 7 | 21 December 1767 |
An Act for punishing Mutiny and Desertion; and for the better Payment of the Army and their Quarters. (Repealed by Statute Law Revision Act 1867 (30 & 31 Vict. c. 59))
| Land Tax Act 1768 (repealed) | 8 Geo. 3. c. 8 | 21 December 1767 |
An Act for granting an Aid to His Majesty by a Land Tax, to be raised in Great Britain, for the Service of the Year One thousand seven hundred and sixty-eight. (Repealed by Statute Law Revision Act 1867 (30 & 31 Vict. c. 59))
| Importation Act 1768 (repealed) | 8 Geo. 3. c. 9 | 29 January 1768 |
An Act to continue and amend an Act, made in the Fifth Year of the Reign of His present Majesty, intituled, "An Act for importation of Salted Beef, Pork, Bacon, and Butter, from Ireland, for a limited lime;" (Note: Importation Act 1765 (5 Geo. 3. c. 1)) and for allowing the Importation of Salted Beef, Pork, Bacon, and Butter, from the British Dominions in America, for a limited Time. (Repealed by Statute Law Revision Act 1867 (30 & 31 Vict. c. 59))
| Bath Theatre Act 1768 (repealed) | 8 Geo. 3. c. 10 | 29 January 1768 |
An Act to enable His Majesty to licence a Playhouse in the City of Bath. (Repealed by Statute Law Revision Act 1948 (11 & 12 Geo. 6. c. 62))
| East India Company Act 1768 (repealed) | 8 Geo. 3. c. 11 | 24 February 1768 |
An Act for further regulating the Proceedings of the United Company of Merchants of England trading to the East Indies, with respect to the making of Dividends. (Repealed by Statute Law Revision Act 1867 (30 & 31 Vict. c. 59))
| Marine Mutiny Act 1768 (repealed) | 8 Geo. 3. c. 12 | 24 February 1768 |
An Act for the Regulation of His Majesty's Marine Forces while on Shore. (Repealed by Statute Law Revision Act 1867 (30 & 31 Vict. c. 59))
| Army in Ireland Act 1768 (repealed) | 8 Geo. 3. c. 13 | 24 February 1768 |
An Act to explain and amend so much of an Act made in the Tenth Year of the Reign of King William the Third, intituled, "An Act for granting an Aid to His Majesty for disbanding the Army, and other necessary Occasions," (Note: Disbanding the Army Act 1698 (10 Will. 3. c. 1)) as relates to the Number of Troops to be kept upon the Irish Establishment. (Repealed by Statute Law Revision Act 1867 (30 & 31 Vict. c. 59))
| Great Sessions in Wales Act 1768 (repealed) | 8 Geo. 3. c. 14 | 24 February 1768 |
An Act for providing proper Accommodations for His Majesty's Justices of the Great Sessions in Wales, during the Time of holding such Sessions. (Repealed by Statute Law Revision Act 1867 (30 & 31 Vict. c. 59))
| Transportation Act 1768 (repealed) | 8 Geo. 3. c. 15 | 24 February 1768 |
An Act for the more speedy and effectual Transportation of Offenders. (Repealed by Transportation Act 1824 (5 Geo. 4. c. 84))
| Glasgow (Improvement) Act 1768 (repealed) | 8 Geo. 3. c. 16 | 24 February 1768 |
An Act for making and widening a passage or street from The Salt Market Street, in the city of Glasgow, to Saint Andrew's Church, in the said City; and for enlarging and compleating the Church-yard of the said Church; and for making and building a convenient Exchange or Square in the said City; and also for explaining and amending an Act passed in the Thirty second year of His late Majesty, (Note: Clyde Bridge Act 1758 (32 Geo. 2. c. 62)) for improving the Navigation of the river Clyde, to the City of Glasgow; and for building a Bridge Cross the said River, from the said City to the Village of Gorbells. (Repealed by Statute Law (Repeals) Act 1981 (c. 19))
| Journeymen Tailors (London) Act 1768 (repealed) | 8 Geo. 3. c. 17 | 8 March 1768 |
An Act to amend an Act, made in the Seventh Year of King George the First, intituled, "An Act for regulating the Journeymen Taylors within the Weekly Bills of Mortality." (Note: Journeymen Tailors, London Act 1720 (7 Geo. 1. St. 1. c. 13)) (Repealed by Combinations of Workmen Act 1825 (6 Geo. 4. c. 129))
| Unfunded Debt Act 1768 (repealed) | 8 Geo. 3. c. 18 | 8 March 1768 |
An Act for raising a certain Sum of Money, by Loans or Exchequer Bills, for the Service of the Year one thousand seven hundred and sixty eight. (Repealed by Statute Law Revision Act 1867 (30 & 31 Vict. c. 59))
| Mutiny, America Act 1768 (repealed) | 8 Geo. 3. c. 19 | 8 March 1768 |
An Act for further continuing an Act of the Sixth Year of His present Majesty's Reign, (Note: Mutiny in America Act 1766 (6 Geo. 3. c. 18)) intituled, "An Act to amend and render more effectual in His Majesty's Dominions in America, an Act passed in this present Session of Parliament, (Note: Mutiny Act 1766 (6 Geo. 3. c. 8)) intituled, 'An Act for punishing Mutiny and Desertion, and for the better Payment of the Army and their Quarters.'" (Repealed by Statute Law Revision Act 1867 (30 & 31 Vict. c. 59))
| Militia Pay Act 1768 (repealed) | 8 Geo. 3. c. 20 | 8 March 1768 |
An Act for defraying the Charge of the Pay and Cloathing of the Militia in that Part of Great Britain called England, for One Year, beginning the Twenty-fifth Day of March One thousand seven hundred and sixty-eight. (Repealed by Statute Law Revision Act 1867 (30 & 31 Vict. c. 59))
| Paving, etc., of London Act 1768 (repealed) | 8 Geo. 3. c. 21 | 8 March 1768 |
An Act for the better paving, cleansing, and enlightening, the City of London, and the Liberties thereof, and for preventing Obstructions and Annoyances within the same, and for other Purposes therein mentioned; and for repealing an Act, made in the Sixth Year of His present Majesty's Reign (Note: London Paving and Lighting Act 1766 (6 Geo. 3. c. 26)) for those Purposes. (Repealed by City of London Sewerage Act 1771 (11 Geo. 3. c. 29))
| Colonial Trade Act 1768 (repealed) | 8 Geo. 3. c. 22 | 8 March 1768 |
An Act for the more easy and effectual Recovery of the Penalties and Forfeitures inflicted by the Acts of Parliament relating to the Trade and Revenues in the British Colonies and Plantations in America. (Repealed by Customs Law Repeal Act 1825 (6 Geo. 4. c. 105))
| Customs Act 1768 (repealed) | 8 Geo. 3. c. 23 | 8 March 1768 |
An Act to repeal so much of an Act, made in the Fourth Year of His present Majesty, (Note: Supply, etc. Act 1763 (4 Geo. 3. c. 13)) as affects the Islands of Guernsey and Jersey, with respect to the Leakage of Wines imported into this Kingdom from the Said Islands, under certain Restrictions and Regulations; and for continuing an Act, made in the Thirty-third Year of His late Majesty, (Note: Sail Cloth Act 1759 (33 Geo. 2. c. 17)) for the better Encouragement of the making of Sail Cloth in Great Britain. (Repealed by Statute Law Revision Act 1867 (30 & 31 Vict. c. 59))
| Exportation Act 1768 (repealed) | 8 Geo. 3. c. 24 | 8 March 1768 |
An Act to permit the Exportation of certain Quantities of Malt belonging to certain Merchants in the County of Norfolk, and which were made for Exportation between the Fifteenth of November One thousand seven hundred and sixty-six, and the passing the Act of the last Session, (Note: Importation and Exportation (No. 6) Act 1766 (7 Geo. 3. c. 3)) for prohibiting the Exportation of Malt. (Repealed by Statute Law Revision Act 1867 (30 & 31 Vict. c. 59))
| Stamps Act 1768 (repealed) | 8 Geo. 3. c. 25 | 8 March 1768 |
An Act for reducing the Duties on Foul Salt to be used for Manure; for altering the Stamp Duties on certain Policies of Assurance; for amending so much of an Act, made in the Thirty-third Year of the Reign of His late Majesty King George the Second, (Note: Exportation (No. 2) Act 1759 (33 Geo. 2. c. 28)) as relates to the Allowance of the Duties of Customs, and exempting from the Duties of Excise such Rum or Spirits of the Growth, Produce, or Manufacture of the British Sugar Plantations in America, as shall be exported from this Kingdom; for better securing the Excise Duties upon Foreign Liquors imported; for repealing a Clause in an Act, made in the last Session of Parliament, (Note: Tea Act 1767 (7 Geo. 3. c. 56)) prohibiting the Sale of condemned Tea for Home Consumption; for amending such Parts of Two Acts, made in the Sixth (Note: Importation, etc. Act 1766 (6 Geo. 3. c. 28)) and Seventh (Note: Importation (No. 9) Act 1766 (7 Geo. 3. c. 43)) Years of the Reign of His present Majesty, as relate to the depositing in the Warehouses belonging to the Custom House at London, Foreign Wrought Silks, and Velvets, and Cambricks, and French Lawns, upon the Seizure thereof. (Repealed by Inland Revenue Repeal Act 1870 (33 & 34 Vict. c. 99))
| Duchy of Cornwall Act 1768 (repealed) | 8 Geo. 3. c. 26 | 8 March 1768 |
An Act to enable His Majesty to make Leases, Copies, and Grants of Offices, Lands, and Hereditaments, Parcel of the Duchy of Cornwall, or annexed to the same and for other Purposes therein mentioned. (Repealed by Statute Law Revision Act 1948 (11 & 12 Geo. 6. c. 62))
| Whale Fishery Act 1768 (repealed) | 8 Geo. 3. c. 27 | 8 March 1768 |
An Act for the further continuing several Acts of Parliament made for the Encouragement of the Whale Fishery carried on by His Majesty's Subjects. (Repealed by Statute Law Revision Act 1867 (30 & 31 Vict. c. 59))
| Norwich Theatre Act 1768 (repealed) | 8 Geo. 3. c. 28 | 8 March 1768 |
An Act for licensing a playhouse within the City of Norwich. (Repealed by Statute Law Revision Act 1948 (11 & 12 Geo. 6. c. 62))
| National Debt Act 1768 (repealed) | 8 Geo. 3. c. 29 | 8 March 1768 |
An Act for redeeming the Remainder of the joint Stock of Annuities established by an Act, made in the Third Year of His present Majesty's Reign, intituled, "An Act for granting to His Majesty several Additional Duties upon Wines imported into this Kingdom; and certain Duties upon all Cyder and Perry, and for raising the Sum of Three millions five hundred thousand Pounds, by Way of Annuities and Lotteries, to be charged on the said Duties." (Note: National Debt (No. 2) Act 1762 (3 Geo. 3. c. 12)) (Repealed by Statute Law Revision Act 1870 (33 & 34 Vict. c. 69))
| Supply, etc. Act 1768 (repealed) | 8 Geo. 3. c. 30 | 10 March 1768 |
An Act for granting to His Majesty a certain Sum of Money out of the Sinking Fund; and for applying certain Monies therein mentioned, for the Service of the Year One thousand seven hundred and sixty-eight; and for further appropriating the Supplies granted in this Session of Parliament. (Repealed by Statute Law Revision Act 1867 (30 & 31 Vict. c. 59))
| National Debt (No. 2) Act 1768 (repealed) | 8 Geo. 3. c. 31 | 10 March 1768 |
An Act for raising a certain Sum of Money, by way of Annuities, and a Lottery attended with Annuities, to be charged on the Sinking Fund; and for carrying certain Duties on Wines, and on Cyder and Perry, granted by Two Acts of the Third and Sixth (Note: Duties on Cider, etc. Act 1766 (6 Geo. 3. c. 14)) Years of the Reign of His present Majesty, to the said Fund. (Repealed by Statute Law Revision Act 1870 (33 & 34 Vict. c. 69))
| Gresham College, etc. Act 1768 | 8 Geo. 3. c. 32 | 10 March 1768 |
An Act for carrying into Execution an Agreement made between the Mayor and Commonalty and Citizens of the City of London, and the Wardens and Commonalty of the Mystery of Mercers of the said City, (Note: The 'Mystery of Mercers' is the Worshipful Company of Mercers.) and Stamp Brooksbank Esquire, Secretary to the Commissioners of His Majesty's Revenue of Excise, for the Purchase of Gresham College, and the Ground and Buildings thereunto belonging, and for vesting the same unalienably in the Crown, for the Purpose of erecting and building an Excise Office there; and for enabling the Lecturers of the said College to marry; notwithstanding any Restriction contained in the Will of Sir Thomas Gresham Knight, deceased.
| Shoreditch Streets Act 1768 (repealed) | 8 Geo. 3. c. 33 | 8 March 1768 |
An Act for opening certain passages, and for paving the Streets, and other Places, in the Parish of Saint Leonard Shoreditch, in the County of Middlesex, and for preventing Annoyances therein. (Repealed by Statute Law (Repeals) Act 2013 (c. 2))
| Oxford Roads Act 1768 (repealed) | 8 Geo. 3. c. 34 | 21 December 1767 |
An Act to enlarge and vary the Term and Powers of an Act (Note: Oxford and Fifield Road Act 1766 (7 Geo. 3. c. 66)) for repairing and widening the Road from the West End of Thames Street, in the City of Oxford, over Botley Causeway, to the Turnpike Road near Fifield, in the County of Berks; and to provide more effectually for repairing and widening the ancient Horse Road from the West End of Botley Causeway to Witney, in the County of Oxford. (Repealed by Oxford, Fifield and Witney Roads Act 1835 (5 & 6 Will. 4. c. ciii))
| Goudhurst Roads Act 1768 (repealed) | 8 Geo. 3. c. 35 | 21 December 1767 |
An Act for amending, widening, and keeping in Repair, several Roads leading to and through the Town of Goudhurst in the County of Kent. (Repealed by Roads to and through Goudhurst Act 1832 (2 & 3 Will. 4. c. lxxiv))
| Coventry Canal Act 1768 | 8 Geo. 3. c. 36 | 29 January 1768 |
An Act for making and maintaining a Navigable Canal from the City of Coventry, to communicate, upon Fradley Health in the County of Stafford, with a Canal now making between the Rivers Trent and Mersey.
| Droitwich Canal Act 1768 | 8 Geo. 3. c. 37 | 29 January 1768 |
An Act for making and maintaining a navigable Cut or Canal from the River Severn, at or near a Place called Hawford, in the Parish of Claines, in the County of Worcester, to or near a Place called Chapel Bridge, within the Borough of Droitwich, in the said County.
| Birmingham Canal Navigation Act 1768 or the Birmingham Canal Act 1768 (repealed) | 8 Geo. 3. c. 38 | 24 February 1768 |
An Act for making and maintaining a Navigable Cut or Canal from Birmingham to Bilstone, and from thence to Autherley, there to communicate with the Canal now making between the Rivers Severn and Trent, and for making collateral Cuts up to several Coal Mines. (Repealed by Birmingham Canal Navigations Act 1835 (5 & 6 Will. 4. c. xxxiv))
| Droitwich Roads Act 1768 (repealed) | 8 Geo. 3. c. 39 | 29 January 1768 |
An Act to continue the Terms, and enlarge the Powers, of several Acts of the Twelfth of Queen Anne, (Note: Worcester Highways Act 1713 (13 Ann. c. 27)) the Twelfth of King George the First, (Note: Worcester Roads Act 1725 (12 Geo. 1. c. 14)) and the Twenty-second of His late Majesty, (Note: Worcestershire Roads Act 1748 (22 Geo. 2. c. 43)) for repairing the Road from the City of Worcester, through Droitwich, to Bromsgrove, and other Roads therein mentioned; and to repeal an Act of the Twenty-eighth Year of His late Majesty, (Note: Worcestershire Roads Act 1755 (28 Geo. 2. c. 48)) for repairing the Roads lying in, and leading from Droitwich aforesaid; and for amending the several Roads which were directed to be repaired by the said Act. (Repealed by Worcester Roads Act 1793 (33 Geo. 3. c. 175))
| Coventry Gaol Act 1768 (repealed) | 8 Geo. 3. c. 40 | 24 February 1768 |
An Act for rebuilding and enlarging the Common Gaol of the City and County of the City of Coventry; and for appointing a Place for the Custody of Prisoners in the mean Time. (Repealed by Statute Law (Repeals) Act 2008 (c. 12))
| Gloucester and Oxford Roads Act 1768 (repealed) | 8 Geo. 3. c. 41 | 24 February 1768 |
An Act for continuing and enlarging the Powers of an Act, passed in the Twenty-fourth Year of the Reign of His late Majesty, intituled, "An Act for repairing the Road from the Top of Crickley Hill in the County of Gloucester, to Frogg Mill, through the Towns of North Leach, Burford, and Witney, and Parishes of Hanborough and Bladon, to Campsfield, in the Parish of Kidlington, in the County of Oxford; and also the Road from Witney, through Eynsham, Cumner, and Botley, to the City of Oxford;" (Note: Gloucester and Oxford Road Act 1750 (24 Geo. 2. c. 28)) except so much thereof as relates to the Road from Witney, through Eynsham, Cumner, and Botley, to the City of Oxford; and also for repairing and widening the road from Campsfield, to the Turnpike Road at or near Enslow Bridge, in the said County of Oxford. (Repealed by Crickley Hill and Campsfield Roads Act 1821 (1 & 2 Geo. 4. c. cix), Barrington and Campsfield and Enslow Bridge Roads (Oxfordshire) Act 1834 (4 & 5 Will. 4. c. xciv), Annual Turnpike Acts Continuance Act 1869 (32 & 33 Vict. c. 90) and Statute Law (Repeals) Act 2013 (c. 2))
| Sunderland to Durham Road Act 1768 (repealed) | 8 Geo. 3. c. 42 | 24 February 1768 |
An Act for enlarging and continuing the Term and Powers granted by an Act, passed in the Twentieth Year of the Reign of His late Majesty, (Note: Sunderland to Durham Road Act 1746 (20 Geo. 2. c. 13)) for repairing the Road from Sunderland near the Sea, to the City of Durham in the County of Durham. (Repealed by Sunderland and Durham Road Act 1831 (1 & 2 Will. 4. c. lxiv))
| Maidstone to Cranbrook Road Act 1768 (repealed) | 8 Geo. 3. c. 43 | 24 February 1768 |
An Act to enlarge the Term and powers of an Act, made in the Thirty-third Year of the Reign of His late Majesty, (Note: Maidstone to Cranbrook Road Act 1759 (33 Geo. 2. c. 57)) for repairing the Road from the Thirty-nine Mile Stone in Maidstone, to Tubb's Lake, in the Parish of Cranbrooke, in the County of Kent. (Repealed by Maidstone and Cranbrook Road Act 1813 (53 Geo. 3. c. clxxxviii) and Annual Turnpike Acts Continuance Act 1867 (30 & 31 Vict. c. 121))
| Halifax Water Supply, etc. Act 1768 (repealed) | 8 Geo. 3. c. 44 | 24 February 1768 |
An Act to amend and render more effectual an Act made in the Second Year of the Reign of His present Majesty, (Note: Halifax (Water Supply) Act 1762 (2 Geo. 3. c. 40)) for supplying the Town of Halifax with Water; and for better paving, cleansing, and lighting the Streets and other Places there; and for removing all Nuisances, Incroachments, and Obstructions within the said Town, and preventing the like for the future. (Repealed by Halifax Improvement Act 1823 (4 Geo. 4. c. xc))
| Shoreditch and Enfield Road Act 1768 (repealed) | 8 Geo. 3. c. 45 | 24 February 1768 |
An Act to continue and render more effectual several Acts passed for repairing the Road leading from The Stones End, in the Parish of Saint Leonard Shoreditch, in the County of Middlesex, to the farthermost Part of the Northern Road, in the Parish of Enfield, in the same County, next to the Parish of Cheshunt, in the County of Hertford; and for amending the Road from The Watch House in Edmonton, to the Market Place in Enfield. (Repealed by Middlesex Roads Act 1789 (29 Geo. 3. c. 96))
| Marylebone Improvement Act 1768 (repealed) | 8 Geo. 3. c. 46 | 24 February 1768 |
An Act for repealing an Act made in the Twenty-ninth Year of the Reign of His late Majesty King George the Second, intituled, "An Act for the better regulating the Nightly Watch and Beadles; and cleaning, enlightening, and paving the Streets, Squares, Lanes, and other Passages, and repairing the Highways and Causeways; and regulating the Poor within the Parish of Saint Mary le Bone, in the County of Middlesex;" (Note: Saint Marylebone Watch Act 1756 (29 Geo. 2. c. 53)) and for making more effectual Provision for those Purposes. (Repealed by Saint Marylebone Improvement Act 1795 (35 Geo. 3. c. 73))
| Yorks and Derby Roads Act 1768 (repealed) | 8 Geo. 3. c. 47 | 24 February 1768 |
An Act for diverting, altering, widening, repairing, and amending the Road from Huddersfield in the West Riding of the County of York, to Woodhead in the County Palatine of Chester; and from thence to a Bridge over the River Mersey, called Enterclough Bridge, on the Confines of the County of Derby. (Repealed by Huddersfield, Woodhead and Derby Road Act 1831 (1 & 2 Will. 4. c. xl))
| Wilts Roads Act 1768 (repealed) | 8 Geo. 3. c. 48 | 8 March 1768 |
An Act for continuing the Terms of several Acts, made in the Thirteenth Year of King George the First, (Note: Chippenham Roads Act 1726 (13 Geo. 1. c. 13)) and in the Seventeenth (Note: Wiltshire Roads (No. 2) Act 1743 (17 Geo. 2. c. 27)) and Thirty-second (Note: Wilts Roads Act 1758 (32 Geo. 2. c. 63)) Years of His late Majesty, for repairing several Roads leading from and through Chippenham, and from Chippenham Bridge, (Note: The town bridge in Chippenham, Wiltshire. 51°27′33″N 2°07′01″W) in the County of Wilts; and for amending the Said Acts, and reducing them into One Act of Parliament. (Repealed by Roads from Studley Bridge and from Chippenham Act 1818 (58 Geo. 3. c. xliii))
| Wilts and Somerset Roads Act 1768 (repealed) | 8 Geo. 3. c. 49 | 8 March 1768 |
An Act to enlarge the Term and Powers of an Act, made in the Twenty-fifth Year of the Reign of His late Majesty King George the Second, (Note: Wiltshire and Somerset Roads Act 1751 (25 Geo. 2. c. 17)) for repairing the Road from The Green Man, in the Chapelry of Seend, in the County of Wilts, to Beckington, in the County of Somerset; and for repealing so much of an Act, made in the same Year, (Note: Wiltshire and Somerset Roads (No. 2) Act 1751 (25 Geo. 2. c. 24)) for repairing several Roads in the Counties of Wilts and Somerset, as relates to the Road from a Place in Trowle Bridge Lane to Midford, and from Freshford to Hall's Close in Limpley Stoke; and for amending the Said Roads, and also several other Roads leading from or near the Roads included in the Said Acts. (Repealed by Seend, Trowbridge and Beckington Road Act 1799 (39 Geo. 3. c. lxiii))
| Reading and Hatfield Road Act 1768 (repealed) | 8 Geo. 3. c. 50 | 8 March 1768 |
An Act for repairing, widening, turning, and altering, the Road leading from Reading, in the County of Berks, through Henley, in the County of Oxford; and Great Marlow, Chipping Wycombe, Agmondesham, and Cheynes, in the County of Bucks; and Rickmansworth, Watford, and Saint Albans, to Hatfield, in the County of Hertford; and also the Road leading out of the Said Road at Marlow, over Great Marlow Bridge, through Bysham, to or near the Thirty mile Stone in the Turnpike Road leading from Maidenhead to Reading. (Repealed by Road from Reading to Hatfield Act 1829 (10 Geo. 4. c. cxxxiii))
| Salop, Radnor and Montgomery Roads Act 1768 (repealed) | 8 Geo. 3. c. 51 | 8 March 1768 |
An Act for amending and widening several Roads leading from the Town of Bishop's Castle, and from Montgomery, to the Turnpike Road at Westbury, and from Brocton to the Turnpike Road at Minsterley, in the several Counties of Salop, Radnor, and Montgomery. (Repealed by Roads from Bishop's Castle, Montgomery and Brockton Act 1822 (3 Geo. 4. c. xlix))
| Hardington and Old Stratford Road Act 1768 (repealed) | 8 Geo. 3. c. 52 | 24 February 1768 |
An Act for repairing and widening the road from the Way Post in the Parish of Hardingston, in the County of Northampton, to Old Stratford, in the same County. (Repealed by Roads from Hardingston to Old Stratford Act 1810 (50 Geo. 3. c. lxiii) and Road from Hardingston to Old Stratford (Northamptonshire) Act 1832 (2 & 3 Will. 4. c. iv) (Note: Incorrectly cited as "2 & 3 Will. 4. c. vi" in the Chronological Table of the Statutes.))
| Somerset Roads Act 1768 (repealed) | 8 Geo. 3. c. 53 | 24 February 1768 |
An Act for repairing and widening the Road from Buckland Dinham, to the End of the Parish of Timsbury; and also the Road from Midsummer Norton, to the End of the Parish of Norton Saint Phillips; and also the Road from Tucker's Grave, to the Road leading from Wellow, to a Place known by the Name of The Red Post, in the County of Somerset. (Repealed by Road from Buckland Dinham and from Kilmersdon Act 1810 (50 Geo. 3. c. xi) and Roads from Radstock Act 1830 (11 Geo. 4 & 1 Will. 4. c. xxxiv))
| Yorkshire Roads Act 1768 (repealed) | 8 Geo. 3. c. 54 | 8 March 1768 |
An Act for amending and widening the Road from the City of York, to the Top of Oswaldkirk Bank, and from the Said Road in Sutton Field, through Craike towards Oulston, to the Extent of the Lordship of Craike, in the County of York. (Repealed by York and Oswaldkirk Bank Road Act 1825 (6 Geo. 4. c. cl))
| Thetford and Newmarket Road Act 1768 (repealed) | 8 Geo. 3. c. 55 | 24 February 1768 |
An Act for amending the Road from Christopher's Bridge, in the Borough of Thetford, in the County of Suffolk, to the North-east End of the Town of New-market in the County of Cambridge. (Repealed by Thetford and Newmarket Road Act 1828 (9 Geo. 4. c. li))
| Kingston-upon-Thames to Sheet Bridge Road Act 1768 (repealed) | 8 Geo. 3. c. 56 | 8 March 1768 |
An Act to explain, amend, and render more effectual, and to enlarge the Term and Powers granted by an Act, passed in the Twenty-second Year of the Reign of His late Majesty, (Note: Surrey and Sussex Roads Act 1748 (22 Geo. 2. c. 35)) so far as the Said Act relates to the repairing and widening the Road from the Town of Kingston upon Thames, in the County of Surrey, to a Place called Sheet Bridge, near Petersfield, in the County of Southampton. (Repealed by Road from Kingston-upon-Thames to Sheetbridge Act 1803 (43 Geo. 3. c. cxi))
| Dunbar Water Supply Act 1768 (repealed) | 8 Geo. 3. c. 57 | 8 March 1768 |
An Act for the better supplying the Town of Dunbar with Fresh Water. (Repealed by Dunbar Burgh and Harbour Act 1848 (11 & 12 Vict. c. cxxii))
| Hertford Shire-house Act 1768 | 8 Geo. 3. c. 58 | 8 March 1768 |
An Act for taking down the present Shire-house in the Market Place of the Town of Hertford, in the County of Hertford; and for building a new one on a more extensive and commodious Plan in the Market Place of the Said Town.
| Selkirk Roads Act 1768 (repealed) | 8 Geo. 3. c. 59 | 8 March 1768 |
An Act for repairing several Roads leading through the County of Selkirk. (Repealed by Selkirk Roads Act 1807 (47 Geo. 3 Sess. 1. c. xxiii))
| Roxburgh Roads Act 1768 (repealed) | 8 Geo. 3. c. 60 | 8 March 1768 |
An Act for repairing several Roads leading through the County of Roxburgh. (Repealed by Roxburgh and Berwick Roads and Bridges Act 1806 (46 Geo. 3. c. xlviii))
| Abingdon to Swinford Road Act 1768 (repealed) | 8 Geo. 3. c. 61 | 8 March 1768 |
An Act for repairing and widening the Road from the Mayor's Stone in Abingdon, in the County of Berks, through Cumner to the ancient Horse Road at Swinford, in the Said County. (Repealed by Roads from Oxford over Botley Causeway Act 1814 (54 Geo. 3. c. clxxxvi) and Statute Law (Repeals) Act 2013 (c. 2))
| Portsmouth Improvement Act 1768 (repealed) | 8 Geo. 3. c. 62 | 8 March 1768 |
An Act for the better paving and cleansing the Streets, and other publick Passages in the Town of Portsmouth, in the County of Southampton; and for preventing Nuisances and Annoyances therein, and for widening and rendering the same more commodious. (Repealed by Municipal Corporations Act 1835 (5 & 6 Will. 4. c. 76) and Portsmouth Improvement Act 1847 (10 & 11 Vict. c. cclvii))
| Forth and Clyde Navigation Act 1768 (repealed) | 8 Geo. 3. c. 63 | 8 March 1768 |
An Act for making and maintaining a Navigable Cut or Canal from the Firth or River of Forth, at or near the Mouth of the River of Carron, in the County of Stirling, to the Firth or River of Clyde, at or near a Place called Dalmuir Burn-foot, in the County of Dumbarton; and also a collateral Cut from the same to the City of Glasgow, and for making a Navigable Cut or Canal of Communication from the Port and Harbour of Borrowstounness, to join the Said Canal, at or near, the Place where it will fall into the Firth of Forth. (Repealed by Forth and Clyde Navigation Act 1820 (1 Geo. 4. c. xlviii) and Forth and Clyde Navigation Act 1841 (4 & 5 Vict. c. lv))

=== Private acts ===
| Short title | Citation | Royal assent |
Long title
| Stow Inclosure Act 1768 | 8 Geo. 3. c. 1 Pr. | 21 December 1767 |
An Act for dividing and enclosing the Open and Common Fields and Meadows of Stow, within the Parish of Threckingham, in the County of Lincoln.
| James Shuttleworth the younger (and issue): change of name and arms to Holden, pursuant to the will of Robert Holden. | 8 Geo. 3. c. 2 Pr. | 21 December 1767 |
An Act to enable James Shuttleworth the younger Esquire, and his Issue, to take and use the Surname and Arms of Holden, pursuant to the Will of Robert Holden Esquire, deceased.
| John Grundy: change of name and arms to Swinsen. | 8 Geo. 3. c. 3 Pr. | 21 December 1767 |
An Act to enable James Swinsen (lately called John Grundy), and his Issue, to take and use the Surname and Arms of Swinsen.
| Reverend Ralph Drake (and issue): change of name and arms to Brockman, pursuant to the will of James Brockman. | 8 Geo. 3. c. 4 Pr. | 21 December 1767 |
An Act to enable the Reverend Ralph Drake Clerk, and his Issue, to take and bear the Surname and Arms of Brockman, pursuant to the Will of James Brockman Esquire, deceased.
| Naturalization of William Aubert. | 8 Geo. 3. c. 5 Pr. | 21 December 1767 |
An Act for naturalizing William Aubert.
| Naturalization of Dirk Willem Van Dam. | 8 Geo. 3. c. 6 Pr. | 21 December 1767 |
An Act for naturalizing Dirk Willem Van Dam.
| Naturalization of John Rossier, Charles de Willermin, Nicholas Freeze, John Schlapffer, and Lewis Repinder. | 8 Geo. 3. c. 7 Pr. | 21 December 1767 |
An Act for naturalizing John Francis Rossier, Charles Augustus Rodolph Lewis de Willermin, Nicholas Freeze, John James Schlapffer, and Lewis Reminder.
| Lougthon Inclosure Act 1768 | 8 Geo. 3. c. 8 Pr. | 29 January 1768 |
An Act for dividing and enclosing the Open and Common Fields, Common Meadows, Common Pastures, and other Commonable Lands and Grounds in the Parish of Loughton, in the County of Bucks.
| John Wallinger (formerly Arnold) and issue: continuing, establishing and confirming the name and arms of Wallinger, pursuant to the will of John Wallinger. | 8 Geo. 3. c. 9 Pr. | 29 January 1768 |
An Act for continuing, establishing, and confirming the Surname and Arms of Wallinger unto John Wallinger, formerly called John Arnold, and his Issue, pursuant to the Will of John Wallinger, his late Uncle, deceased.
| Judith Paul (and issue): change of name to Saint Paul. | 8 Geo. 3. c. 10 Pr. | 29 January 1768 |
An Act to enable Judith Paul, and her Issue, to use and take the Name of Saint Paul.
| Naturalization of David Peyer Imhoff. | 8 Geo. 3. c. 11 Pr. | 29 January 1768 |
An Act for naturalizing David Peyer Imhoff.
| Rempstone Inclosure Act 1768 | 8 Geo. 3. c. 12 Pr. | 24 February 1768 |
An Act for dividing and enclosing several Open Fields and Commons Within the Lordship and Liberty of Rempstone in the County of Nottingham.
| Hotham Inclosure Act 1768 | 8 Geo. 3. c. 13 Pr. | 24 February 1768 |
An Act for dividing and enclosing the Open and Common Fields, Meadows, and Pastures within the Township of Hotham, in the East Riding of the County of York.
| Leamington Priors Inclosure Act 1768 | 8 Geo. 3. c. 14 Pr. | 24 February 1768 |
An Act for dividing and enclosing the Open and Common Fields, Common Meadows, and Commonable Lands, oh the South and West Parts of the River Leam, in the Manor and Parish of Lemington Priors, in the County of Warwick.
| Billingborough and Birthorpe (Lincolnshire) inclosure and drainage. | 8 Geo. 3. c. 15 Pr. | 24 February 1768 |
An Act for dividing and enclosing the Open and Common Fields, Meadows, and Common Fen, within the parishes of Billingborough and Birthorpe in the County of Lincoln; and for draining and improving the said Fen.
| Millington Inclosure Act 1768 | 8 Geo. 3. c. 16 Pr. | 24 February 1768 |
An Act for dividing and enclosing the Open and Common Fields, Common Pastures, Commons, and Wastes, within the Township of Millington in the County of York.
| Bridlington Inclosure Act 1768 | 8 Geo. 3. c. 17 Pr. | 24 February 1768 |
An Act for dividing and enclosing the several Open Fields, Lands, Grounds, Meadows, Pastures, Commons, and Wastes, within the Township of Bridlington in the East Riding of the County of york, and for extinguishing the Right of Common or Average upon certain ancient Enclosures within the same Township.
| Winfrith Newburgh Inclosure Act 1768 | 8 Geo. 3. c. 18 Pr. | 24 February 1768 |
An Act for dividing and enclosing the Common Fields, Meadow Grounds, Sheep Downs, Commons, Common Heaths, and other Waste Grounds, in the In-Parish of Winfrith Newburgh in the County of Dorset.
| Ketton Inclosure Act 1768 | 8 Geo. 3. c. 19 Pr. | 24 February 1768 |
An Act for dividing and enclosing the several Open Common Fields, Meadow Grounds, Heath, and Commonable Lands, in the Parish of Ketton in the County of Rutland.
| Hook (Snaith) (Yorkshire) inclosure and maintenance of banks. | 8 Geo. 3. c. 20 Pr. | 24 February 1768 |
An Act for dividing and enclosing the Open Common Fields, Marshes Waste Grounds, Commons, Carrs, Pasture, and Moor, within the Manor of Hook, in the Parish of Snaith, in the County of York; and for maintaining the Banks within the said Manor and Township.
| Morden Inclosure Act 1768 | 8 Geo. 3. c. 21 Pr. | 24 February 1768 |
An Act for dividing and enclosing the several Commons, Common Heaths, and Waste Grounds in the Manor of Morden, in the County of Dorset.
| Litton Inclosure Act 1768 | 8 Geo. 3. c. 22 Pr. | 24 February 1768 |
An Act for dividing and enclosing several Stinted Pastures within the Township of Litton, in the Parish of Armcliffe, in the County of York.
| Cononly Inclosure Act 1768 | 8 Geo. 3. c. 23 Pr. | 24 February 1768 |
An Act for dividing and enclosing the Common and Waste Ground, within the Township and Manor of Cononly, in the Parish of Kildwick, in the West Riding of the County of York.
| Tilsworth Inclosure Act 1768 | 8 Geo. 3. c. 24 Pr. | 24 February 1768 |
An Act for dividing and enclosing the several Open and Common Fields, within the Manor or Lordship of Tilsworth in the County of Bedford.
| Woughton on the Green Inclosure Act 1768 | 8 Geo. 3. c. 25 Pr. | 24 February 1768 |
An Act for dividing and enclosing the Open and Common Fields, Common Meadows, Common Pastures, and other Commonable Lands and Grounds, in the Parish of Woughton on the Green, in the County of Bucks.
| Brooke's Divorce Act 1768 | 8 Geo. 3. c. 26 Pr. | 24 February 1768 |
An Act to dissolve the Marriage of Thomas Brooke Doctor in Physic, with Harriet Nelthorpe his now Wife, and to enable him to marry again; and for other Purposes therein mentioned.
| Exemplifying and enrolling Elizabeth Bridges' indenture of settlement and Brooke Bridges' will and codicils and making them evidence in Ireland and Britain. | 8 Geo. 3. c. 27 Pr. | 24 February 1768 |
An Act for exemplifying or enrolling an Indenture of Settlement of Elizabeth Bridges, and the Will and Codicils of Brooke Bridges Esquire, and making the same Evidence as well in Ireland as Great Britain.
| Thomas Killborn, and issue male: change of name to Burrowes, pursuant to the will of John Borrowes. | 8 Geo. 3. c. 28 Pr. | 24 February 1768 |
An Act to enable Thomas Kilborn and his Issue Male, to take and use the Surname of Burrowes, pursuant to the Will of John Burrowes deceased.
| Thomas Jenner (an infant) and issue: change of name to Worge, pursuant to the will of George Worge. | 8 Geo. 3. c. 29 Pr. | 24 February 1768 |
An Act to enable Thomas Jenner an Infant, and his Issue, to take and use the Surname of Worge only, pursuant to the Will of George Worge deceased.
| Marquis of Tavistock's Estate Act 1768 | 8 Geo. 3. c. 30 Pr. | 8 March 1768 |
An Act to enable the Most Noble John Duke of Bedford, and the Most Honourable Elizabeth Marchioness of Tavistock, and the Survivor of them, and such Person or Persons as they or the Survivor of them shall, by any Deed or Writing, or by his or her last Will and Testament, nominate or appoint, to make Leases of the Real Estates, late of the Most Honourable Francis Russell, called Marquis of Tavistock, deceased.
| Fisher's Estate Act 1768 | 8 Geo. 3. c. 31 Pr. | 8 March 1768 |
An Act for vesting several undivided Parts of divers Baronies, Lands, and Hereditaments, late the Estate of Brice Fisher Esquire, deceased, situate in the Provinces of South Carolina and Georgia, in America, in Trustees, to be sold, discharged of the Uses of the Will of the Said Brice Fisher; and for vesting the Money arising by such Sale in the Purchase of Lands and Hereditaments in that Part of Great Britain called England, to be settled to the Uses of the Said Will.
| Edwardes' Estate Act 1768 | 8 Geo. 3. c. 32 Pr. | 8 March 1768 |
An Act for establishing and confirming Articles of Agreement, dated Thirty-first of March One thousand seven hundred and fifty-seven, between the Honourable William Edwardes, Rowland Edwardes, John Owen Edwardes, Esquires, and the Right Honourable Henry Lord Holland, concerning the Manor of Abbots Kensington, and divers Messuages, Lands, and Hereditaments in the Parish of Kensington, in the County of Middlesex, and for vesting such Manor, Lands, and Hereditaments in Trust, to sell and convey the same to the Said Henry Lord Holland; and for other Purposes therein mentioned.
| Viscount Fane's Estate Act 1768 | 8 Geo. 3. c. 33 Pr. | 8 March 1768 |
An Act for vesting an undivided Moiety of certain Manors, messuages, Lands, Tenements, and Hereditaments, situate and being in the County of Berks, late the Estate of Charles Lord Viscount Fane deceased, and which upon his Death became vested in Possession in, Dorothy Countess of Sandwich, in Trustees and their Heirs, in Trust, to be sold, and for applying the Money to arise by the Sale thereof in the Manner therein-mentioned.
| Enabling William Tufnell Joliff, lord of Barners or Barnersbury manor in Islington (Middlesex) to grant building leases there and rate and assess fines on copyhold lands with the manor for encouraging tenants to build thereon. | 8 Geo. 3. c. 34 Pr. | 8 March 1768 |
An Act to enable William Tuffnell Joliff Esquire, Lord of the Manor of Barners, otherwise Barnersbury, in Islington, in the County of Middlesex, to grant Building Leases of the Demesne Lands thereto, and to rate and assess Fines on certain Copyhold Lands within the Said Manor, for encouraging the Tenants to build thereon.
| Roger Drake's estate: sale and laying out proceeds for benefit of his eldest son and heir Roger Drake. | 8 Geo. 3. c. 35 Pr. | 8 March 1768 |
An Act for Sale of the Freehold Estate late of Roger Drake Esquire, deceased, and for laying out the Money arising thereby, for the Benefit of Roger Drake, an Infant, his eldest Son and Heir at Law.
| Endowing a building in Stockport (Cheshire) intended as a chapel and erected by William Wright and making it a perpetual cure and benefice. | 8 Geo. 3. c. 36 Pr. | 8 March 1768 |
An Act for making a Building intended for a Chapel, lately erected by William Wright Esquire, in the Township of Stockport, and County and Diocese of Chester, a perpetual Cure and Benefice, and for endowing the same.
| Navestock and Lofthall Inclosure Act 1768 | 8 Geo. 3. c. 37 Pr. | 8 March 1768 |
An Act or dividing and enclosing Common and Heath called Navestock common and Heath, within the Manors of Navestock and Lofthall, in the County of Essex.
| Nun's Green in Derby sale and improvement. | 8 Geo. 3. c. 38 Pr. | 8 March 1768 |
An Act for selling Part of a Green, called Nuns Green, in the Borough of Derby, in the County of Derby, and for applying the Money arising from the Sale thereof in the Improvement of the remaining Part of the Said Green, and for other Purposes therein mentioned.
| Welwick and Weeton Inclosure Act 1768 | 8 Geo. 3. c. 39 Pr. | 8 March 1768 |
An Act for dividing and enclosing certain Open Common Fields, Lands, and Grounds, in Welwick and Weeton, in the Parish of Welwick in Holdernesse, in the East Riding of the County of York.
| Little Sheepey Inclosure Act 1768 | 8 Geo. 3. c. 40 Pr. | 8 March 1768 |
An Act for dividing and enclosing the several Fields, Meadows, Waste and other Commonable Lands, lying within the Manor or Liberty of Little Sheepy, in the County of Leicester.
| Morton Inclosure Act 1768 | 8 Geo. 3. c. 41 Pr. | 8 March 1768 |
An Act for dividing and enclosing the Open Common Fields, Meadow Grounds, and Common Fen, in the Parish of Morton, in the County of Lincoln; and for draining and improving the Said Fen.
| Ashby de la Zouch Inclosure Act 1768 | 8 Geo. 3. c. 42 Pr. | 8 March 1768 |
An Act for dividing and enclosing several Open and Common Fields, Meadows, and Commons, within the Lordship or Liberty of Ashby de la Zouch, in the County of Leicester.
| Willoughton Inclosure Act 1768 | 8 Geo. 3. c. 43 Pr. | 8 March 1768 |
An Act for dividing and enclosing the Open Fields, Meadows, Pastures, and Commonable Lands, in the Parish of Willoughton, in the County of Lincoln.
| Littleover Inclosure Act 1768 | 8 Geo. 3. c. 44 Pr. | 8 March 1768 |
An Act for dividing and enclosing the Commons, Waste Grounds, Open Fields, Common Meadows, and Common Pastures, in the Liberty of Littleover, within the Parish of Mickleover, in the County of Derby.
| East Ayton Inclosure Act 1768 | 8 Geo. 3. c. 45 Pr. | 8 March 1768 |
An Act for dividing and enclosing the Open Commons and Town Fields, within the Township of East Ayton, in the parish of seamer, in the county or York.
| Normanton next Derby Inclosure Act 1768 | 8 Geo. 3. c. 46 Pr. | 8 March 1768 |
An Act for dividing and enclosing the Open Fields, Common Meadows, and Common Pastures, in the Parish of Normanton, next Derby, in the County of Derby.
| Lakenheath and Brandon Drainage Act 1768 | 8 Geo. 3. c. 47 Pr. | 8 March 1768 |
An Act for draining and preserving certain Fen Lands, and Low Grounds, in the Parishes of Lakenheath and Brandon, in the County of Suffolk.
| Lilley and Offley Inclosure Act 1768 | 8 Geo. 3. c. 48 Pr. | 8 March 1768 |
An Act For dividing and enclosing the Common Fields, and other Commonable Lands and Grounds, in the Parishes of Lilley and Offley, in the County of Hertford, except a certain Sheep Down commonly called Lilley Hoo, in the Parish, of Lilley, and certain Lands, Part of the Said Common Fields lying South-east of West Lane End, The Mill House, and Cold's Cross, and North-east of the Town of Offley.
| North Burton or Burton Fleming (Yorkshire) Inclosure Act 1768 | 8 Geo. 3. c. 49 Pr. | 8 March 1768 |
An Act for dividing and enclosing the Open Fields, Lands, and Grounds, within the Township of North Burton, otherwise Burton Fleming, in the County of York.
| Epperstone Inclosure Act 1768 | 8 Geo. 3. c. 50 Pr. | 8 March 1768 |
An Act for dividing and enclosing the open Fields, Meadows, and Commonable Lands, within the Liberties of Epperstone, in the County of Nottingham.
| Wavertree Inclosure Act 1768 | 8 Geo. 3. c. 51 Pr. | 8 March 1768 |
An Act for dividing and enclosing several Commons, and Waste Grounds, within the Manor of Wavertree, in the Parish of Childwall, in the County Palatine of Lancaster.
| Burton Joyce and Bulcoate Inclosure Act 1768 | 8 Geo. 3. c. 52 Pr. | 8 March 1768 |
An Act for dividing and enclosing the Open Fields, Meadows, Common Pastures, and other Commonable Lands, within the Parish and Liberties of Burton Joyce and Bulcoate, in the County of Nottingham.
| Making the exemplification of Richard Fitz Gerald's will evidence in all British and Irish courts. | 8 Geo. 3. c. 53 Pr. | 8 March 1768 |
An Act for making the Exemplification of the last Will of Richard Fitz Gerald Esquire, deceased, Evidence in all Courts of Law and Equity in Great Britain and Ireland.
| Reynold Thomas (an infant): change of name to Deeres, pursuant to the will of Reynold Deere. | 8 Geo. 3. c. 54 Pr. | 8 March 1768 |
An Act to enable Reynold Thomas, an Infant, and his Heirs, to take and use the Surname of Deere, pursuant to the Will of Reynold Deere deceased.
| Enabling and empowering the mayor, commonality and citizens of the city of London to sell and convey to George Earl of Pomfret, the Lordship and manor of Oxenforde and applying the purchase money to purposes therein mentioned. | 8 Geo. 3. c. 55 Pr. | 10 March 1768 |
An Act for enabling and empowering the Mayor and Commonalty and Citizens of the City of London, and their Successors, to sell and convey to the Right Honourable George Earl of Pomfret, the Lordship and Manor of Oxenforde, with the Messages, Lands, and Hereditaments thereto belonging, and for applying the Purchase Money to the Purposes therein mentioned.
| Washington Earl Ferrers' Estate Act 1768 | 8 Geo. 3. c. 56 Pr. | 10 March 1768 |
An Act for the more effectually carrying into Execution An Act, made in the Sixth Year of the Reign of His present Majesty, intituled, "An Act for vesting in Trustees the settled Estate of Washington Earl Ferrers, in the County of Derby, to be sold for satisfying the Incumbrances and Portions affecting the same, and the rest of his settled Estates; and for other Purposes therein mentioned." (Note: Earl Ferrers' Estate Act 1766 (6 Geo. 3. c. 60 Pr.))
| Correcting a mistake in a trustees name in the settlement made of William Earl of Harrington's estate, previous to his marriage to Caroline Countess of Harrington. | 8 Geo. 3. c. 57 Pr. | 10 March 1768 |
An Act for rectifying a Mistake in the Name of One of the Trustees in the Settlement made of the Estates of the Right Honourable William Earl of Harrington, previous to his Marriage with the Right Honourable Caroline Countess of Harrington, his Wife.
| Subjecting and charging a competent part of Tottenham Hall or Tottenham Court manor and lordship (Middlesex) with the payment of a perpetual yearly rent charge to Richard Browne and divesting the fee simple and inheritance of said premises out of him and his successors and vesting the same in trustees to the use of Ann and Charles Fitzroy and their issue, with such powers and authorities as therein are mentioned. | 8 Geo. 3. c. 58 Pr. | 10 March 1768 |
An Act to subject and charge a competent Part of the Manor and Lordship of Tottenham Hall, otherwise Tottenham Court, in the County of Middlesex, and of the Lands and Hereditaments thereunto belonging, with the Payment of a perpetual yearly Rent Charge to Doctor Richard Browne and his Successors; and for diverting the Fee Simple and Inheritance of the said Premises out of him and his Successors, and for vesting the same in Trustees to the Use of Charles Fitzroy Esquire, and Ann his Wife, and their Issue, with such Powers and Authorities as are therein mentioned.
| Sir Thomas and Dame Lucy Gage's estate in Lincolnshire: sale and proceeds to be applied for purposes in the Act mentioned and settling another estate in Suffolk. | 8 Geo. 3. c. 59 Pr. | 10 March 1768 |
An Act for vesting in Trustees and their Heirs an entailed Estate in the County of Lincoln, of Sir Thomas Gage Baronet, Dame Lucy his Wife, and their Issue, in order that the same may be sold, and the Purchase Money applied for the Purposes in the said Act mentioned, and for settling an Estate in the County of Suffolk of the said Sir Thomas Gage, of greater Value, in lieu thereof.
| William Nedham's estate in Jamaica: vesting in trustees for purposes therein mentioned. | 8 Geo. 3. c. 60 Pr. | 10 March 1768 |
An Act for vesting the settled Estate of William Nedham Esquire, in the Island of Jamaica, in Trustees for the Purposes therein mentioned.
| Reverend James and Mary Yorke's estate in Arlington Street (Middlesex): conveyance and purchasing and settling another. | 8 Geo. 3. c. 61 Pr. | 10 March 1768 |
An Act for vesting Part of the settled Estates of the Honourable and Reverend James Yorke and Mary his Wife, situate in Arlington Street, in the County of Middlesex, in Trustees, to be conveyed pursuant to Articles entered into for Sale thereof, and for laying out the Money thereby stipulated to be paid, in the Purchase of other Lands to be settled to the same Uses.
| Confirming and executing an agreement on 26 December 1767 between Walter Waring and Robert Lord Clive and for vesting estates in Salop. and Montgomery in trustees for that purpose. | 8 Geo. 3. c. 62 Pr. | 10 March 1768 |
An Act for confirming and carrying into Execution an Agreement dated the Twenty-fifth Day of December, in the Year One thousand seven hundred and fifty-seven, between Walter Waring Esquire, and the Right Honourable Robert Lord Clive; and for vesting certain Estates in the Counties of Salop and Montgomery, in certain Trustees and their Heirs, for that Purpose.
| Vesting lands in Warfield in Berkshire in John Hart Cotton and for settling and assuring in lieu thereof, a rent charge issuing out of said lands and other lands in Warfield and Binfield belonging to said John Hart Cotton for purposes therein mentioned. | 8 Geo. 3. c. 63 Pr. | 10 March 1768 |
An Act for vesting certain Lands and Hereditaments in the Parish of Warfield, in the County of Berks, with the Appurtenances, in John Hart Cotton, of Warfield aforesaid, Esquire, and for settling and assuring in lieu thereof a Rent Charge of greater Value, to be issuing out of Part of the said Lands and Hereditaments, and also out of a capital Message and Lands in the said Parish of Warfield, and in the Parish of Binfield, in the same County, or One of them, belonging to the said John Hart Cotton, for the Purposes in the Act mentioned.
| Empowering trustees of Thomas Hawkin's four infant sons to make leases of estates in Cornwall, to which they are successively intituled, as tenants in tail, under Philip Hawkins will. | 8 Geo. 3. c. 64 Pr. | 10 March 1768 |
An Act for empowering Trustees, during the respective Minorities of the Four Infant Sons of Thomas Hawkins Esquire, deceased, to make Leases of Estates in the County of Cornwall, to which they are successively entitled as Tenants in Tail under the Will of Philip Hawkins Esquire, deceased, and for other the Purposes therein mentioned.
| Mary Wright's undivided shares in lands in Lancashire: sale and purchase and settling of other lands to the use of the said infant, Mary Wright and heirs, on the part of her mother. | 8 Geo. 3. c. 65 Pr. | 10 March 1768 |
An Act for vesting certain undivided Shares belonging to Mary Wright an Infant, of and in several Messages, Tenements, and Lands, in the County of Lancaster, in Trustees, to be sold; and for laying out the Money arising from the Sale thereof in the Purchase of other Lands, to be settled to the Use of the said Infant and her Heirs, on the Part of her Mother, and for other Purposes therein mentioned.
| Skipton upon Cherwell Inclosure Act 1768 | 8 Geo. 3. c. 66 Pr. | 10 March 1768 |
An Act for dividing and enclosing the Common Fields, and other Commonable Lands and Grounds, in the Parish of Shipton upon Charwell, in the County of Oxford.
| Snainton Inclosure Act 1768 | 8 Geo. 3. c. 67 Pr. | 10 March 1768 |
An Act for, dividing and enclosing the Open Arable Fields, Meadows, Pastures, Commons, and Grounds, within the Township of Snainton, in the Parishes of Brompton and Ebberston, in the North Riding of the County of York.
| Toynton Supra Inclosure Act 1768 | 8 Geo. 3. c. 68 Pr. | 10 March 1768 |
An Act for dividing and enclosing the Open and Common Fields, Cow Pastures, and other Commons and Commonable Lands, in the Parish of Toynton Supra, within the Manor of Horncastle, in the County of Lincoln.
| James Grenville, Isaac Barre, and Richard Rigby oaths of office. | 8 Geo. 3. c. 69 Pr. | 10 March 1768 |
An Act to enable the Right Honourable James Grenville, the Right Honourable Isaac Barre, and the Right Honourable Richard Rigby, to take, in Great Britain, the Oath of Office as Vice Treasurer, and Receiver General, and Paymaster General of all His Majesty's Revenues in the Kingdom of Ireland, and to qualify themselves for the Enjoyment of the said Offices.
| Frederick Viscount Bolingbroke's divorce from Lady Diana Spencer. | 8 Geo. 3. c. 70 Pr. | 10 March 1768 |
An Act to dissolve the Marriage of Frederick Lord Viscount Bolingbroke with Lady Diana Spencer his now Wife, and to enable him to marry again, and for other Purposes therein-mentioned.
| Charles Daly's divorce from Anna Statia Daly, and other provisions. | 8 Geo. 3. c. 71 Pr. | 10 March 1768 |
An Act to dissolve the Marriage of Charles Daly Esquire, with Anna Statia Daly his now Wife, and to enable him to marry again; and for other Purposes therein mentioned.
| Naturalization of Lawrence Laforest. | 8 Geo. 3. c. 72 Pr. | 10 March 1768 |
An Act for naturalizing Lawrence La Forest.

=== Sources ===
- "8 George III - 1767-8". The Statutes at Large. Vol. 28. C. Eyre and A. Strahan. 1768. pp. 1–134 – via Internet Archive.
- "8 George III - 1767-8". The Statutes at Large. Vol. 28. 1768. pp. 1–134 – via Google Books.
- "8 George III - 1767-8". The Statutes at Large. Vol. 28. Printed by J. Bentham. 1807 – via Internet Archive.
- Journals of the House of Commons. Vol. 31. London: His Majesty's Stationery Office. 1803. pp. 421–666 – via Google Books.
- Chronological Table of and Index to the Statutes. Vol. 1: To the End of the Session 59 Vict. Sess. 2 (1895) (13th ed.). London: Her Majesty's Stationery Office. 1896. p. 125 – via Google Books.

== 8 Geo. 3 Sess. 2 ==
The first session of the 13th Parliament of Great Britain, which met from 10 May 1768 until 21 June 1768.

This session was also traditionally cited as 8 G. 3 Sess. 2

=== Public acts ===
| Short title | Citation | Royal assent |
Long title
| Continuance of Laws Act 1768 (repealed) | 8 Geo. 3. Sess. 2. c. 1 | 21 May 1768 |
An Act for further continuing certain Laws, to prohibit for a limited Time the Exportation of Corn, Grain, Meal, Malt, Flour, Bread, Biscuit, and Starch; and also the Extraction of Low Wines and Spirits from Wheat and Wheat Flour; for further allowing the Importation of Wheat and Wheat Flour, Barley, Barley Meal, and Pulse, free of Duty, into this Kingdom, from any Part of Europe; and for allowing the Importation of Oats and Oat Meal, Rye and Rye Meal, into this Kingdom, for a limited Time, free of Duty; and also for continuing such other Laws as will expire before the Beginning of the next Session of Parliament. (Repealed by Statute Law Revision Act 1867 (30 & 31 Vict. c. 59))

=== Private acts ===
| Short title | Citation | Royal assent |
Long title
| Leautier's Naturalization Act 1768 | 8 Geo. 3. Sess. 2. c. 1 Pr. | 21 May 1768 |
An Act for naturalizing John Daniel Leautier.

=== Sources ===
- "8 George III - 1767-8". The Statutes at Large. Vol. 28. C. Eyre and A. Strahan. 1768. p. 137 – via Internet Archive.
- "8 George III - 1767-8". The Statutes at Large. Vol. 28. 1768. p. 137 – via Google Books.
- "8 George III - 1767-8". The Statutes at Large. Vol. 28. Printed by J. Bentham. 1807 – via Internet Archive.
- Journals of the House of Commons. Vol. 32. London: His Majesty's Stationery Office. 1803. pp. 5–18 – via Google Books.
- Chronological Table of and Index to the Statutes. Vol. 1: To the End of the Session 59 Vict. Sess. 2 (1895) (13th ed.). London: Her Majesty's Stationery Office. 1896. p. 125 – via Google Books.

== See also ==
- List of acts of the Parliament of Great Britain
