= Turnpike trusts in South West England =

Historic road maintenance bodies in England

This is a list of turnpike trusts that maintained roads in South West England.

Between 1663 and 1836, the Parliament of Great Britain and the Parliament of the United Kingdom passed a series of acts of Parliament that created organisations – turnpike trusts – that collected road tolls, and used the money to repair the road. These applied to major roads, around a fifth of the road network. The turnpike system was phased out in the 1870s, and major roads transitioned in the 1880s to the maintenance of the new county councils.

The counties used for these lists are the historic counties of England that existed at the time of the turnpike trusts. This article lists those in the south west of England: Cornwall, Devon, Dorset, Gloucestershire, Somerset and Wiltshire.

== Cornwall ==
Trust	Founded	Initial act	
Trust	Founded	Citation	Title
Bodmin Turnpike Trust	1769	9 Geo. 3. c. 69	Bodmin Roads Act 1769; An Act for repairing and widening several Roads, leading to and through the Borough of Bodmin, in the County of Cornwall.
Bodmin and Roche Turnpike Trust	1835	5 & 6 Will. 4. c. cv	Bodmin Roads Act 1835; An Act for more effectually repairing certain Roads leading to and from Bodmin, and other Roads therein mentioned, in the County of Cornwall, and for making and maintaining certain new Roads communicating therewith.
Callington Turnpike Trust	1764	4 Geo. 3. c. 48	Callington Roads Act 1764; An Act for repairing and widening several Roads leading from Callington, in the County of Cornwall.
Camelford, Wadebridge and St Columb Turnpike Trust	1759	33 Geo. 2. c. 42	Cornwall Roads Act 1759; An Act for repairing and widening the Roads from Haleworthy in the Parish of Davidstow in the County of Cornwall to the East End of Wadebridge in the said County, and from the West End of Wadebridge aforesaid into and through the Borough of Mitchell in the said County.
Creed and St Just Turnpike Trust	1762	2 Geo. 3. c. 46	Cornwall Roads Act 1762; An Act for repairing and widening the Road from the Lostwithiel Turnpike Road in the Parish of Creed, in the County of Cornwall, through Tregony, to Ruan Lanehorne; and from Dennis Water to Three Hundred Yards on the South Side of Trethim Mill in the Parish of Saint Just in the said County.
Hayle Bridge Causeway Turnpike Trust	1825	6 Geo. 4. c. iv	Grigg's Quay, Hayle Bridge and Phillack Road (Cornwall) Act 1825; An Act for building a Bridge and making a Causeway and Turnpike Road from or near Grigg's Quay, in the Parish of Uny Lelant, over Hayle River and Sands, in the Parish of Saint Erth, to Carnsew Quay, through Hayle Foundery, in the said Parish of Saint Erth, and Pen Poll in the Parish of Phillack, all in the County of Cornwall.
Helston Turnpike Trust	1760	1 Geo. 3. c. 32	Cornwall Roads Act 1760; Penzance and St. Just Turnpike Roads Act 1863
Launceston Turnpike Trust	1759	33 Geo. 2. c. 59	Launceston Roads Act 1759; An Act for amending, widening, and keeping in Repair, several Roads leading to the Borough of Launceston, in the County of Cornwall.
Liskeard Turnpike Trust	1760	1 Geo. 3. c. 25	Cornwall and Devon Roads Act 1760; An Act for repairing and widening the Road from the East End of West Tap-house Lane to the Borough of Liskeard, and from thence to Coomb Row House; and also the Road from the said Borough of Liskeard to Crafthole, and from thence to Crimble Passage and Tar Point, and from Crafthole aforesaid to Saint German's Beacon; in the Counties of Cornwall and Devon.
Penryn and Redruth Turnpike Trust	1763	3 Geo. 3. c. 52	Cornwall Roads (No. 2) Act 1763; An Act for amending and widening the Roads leading from New Street and Pig Street in Penryn in the County of Cornwall, to Redruth in the same County.
Penzance to St Just Turnpike Trust	1863	26 & 27 Vict. c. xxvii	Penzance and St. Just Turnpike Roads Act 1863; An Act for making a Turnpike Road from Penzance to Saint Just in Penrith in the County of Cornwall, with Branches, and for the Adoption, Alteration, and Improvement, for the Purposes thereof, of certain public Highways; and for other Purposes.
Saltash Turnpike Trust	1762	2 Geo. 3. c. 43	Saltash Roads Act 1762; An Act for repairing and widening several Roads in the Counties of Cornwall and Devon, leading to the Borough of Saltash, in the County of Cornwall.
St Austell and Lostwithiel Turnpike Trust	1760	1 Geo. 3. c. 27	Cornwall Roads Act 1760; An Act for repairing and widening the Road leading from the Eastern End of the Borough of Grampound in the County of Cornwall, through the Towns of Saint Austell and Lostwithiel, and from thence to the East End of The Western Taphouse-Lane in the said County.
Trebarwith Sands Road Turnpike Trust	1825	6 Geo. 4. c. 84	Trebarwith Sands and Condolden Bridge Road Act 1825; An Act for making and maintaining a Turnpike Road from Trebarwith Sands on the Sea Shore, to Condolden Bridge, on the Road leading from Bossiney to Camelford, all in the County of Cornwall.
Truro Turnpike Trust	1754	27 Geo. 2. c. 41	Truro Roads Act 1754; An Act for amending and widening several Roads, leading from the Borough of Truro, in the County of Cornwall.

== Devon ==
Trust	Founded	Initial act	
Trust	Founded	Citation	Title
Ashburton Turnpike Trust	1755	28 Geo. 2. c. 49	Devon Roads Act 1755; An Act for repairing and widening the Road from Chudleigh Bridge, in the Parish of Hennock in the County of Devon, through the Town and Borough of Ashburton, to Brent Bridge, in the Parish of South Brent in the said County.
Barnstaple Turnpike Trust	1763	3 Geo. 3. c. 35	Barnstaple Roads Act 1763; An Act for repairing, widening, and keeping in Repair, several Roads leading from the Town of Barnstaple, in the County of Devon.
Bideford Turnpike Trust	1764	4 Geo. 3. c. 87	Bideford Roads Act 1764; An Act for repairing several Roads leading from the Town of Bideford, in the County of Devon.
Braunton Turnpike Trust; Braunton and New Road Turnpike Trust	1829	10 Geo. 4. c. xvii	Road from Barnstaple to Braunton Act 1829; An Act for making and maintaining a Turnpike Road from Barnstaple to the Town or Village of Braunton in the County of Devon.
Combe Martin Turnpike Trust	1838	1 & 2 Vict. c. xviii	Combe Martin and Bratton Down Turnpike Road (Devon) Act 1838; An Act for making a Turnpike Road from Combmartin in the County of Devon to Bratton Down in the same County, and several other Roads in the Neighbourhood thereof.
Combe Martin and Ilfracombe Turnpike Trust	1866	29 & 30 Vict. c. cxvi	Combemartin and Ilfracombe Turnpike Road Act 1866; An Act for making and maintaining a new Road between Combmartin and Ilfracombe, both in the County of Devon.
Countess Wear Bridge Turnpike Trust	1769	9 Geo. 3. c. 93	Exeter Roads Act 1769; An Act to continue and render more effectual Two Acts for amending several Roads leading from the City of Exeter, and for repairing and widening several other Roads therein mentioned; and for rebuilding or repairing Exe Bridge, and making the Avenues leading thereto more commodious; and for building a Bridge over the River Exe at or near Countess Wear, in the County of Devon.
Cullompton Turnpike Trust	1813	53 Geo. 3. c. lxv	Road from Cullompton to Hazel Stone Act 1813; An Act for making and maintaining a Carriage Road from Padbrooke Bridge in the Parish of Cullompton, to Hazel Stone in the Parish of Broad Clift, in the County of Devon.
Dartmoor and Roborough Turnpike Trust	1812	52 Geo. 3. c. iv	Roborough Down and Dartmoor Road Act 1812; An Act for repairing the Road from Roborough Down to the Tavistock Road near Dart Moor Prison of War, and to Two Bridges, in the County of Devon.
Dartmouth, Torquay and Shaldon Turnpike Trust	1765	5 Geo. 3. c. 69	Devon Roads Act 1765; An Act for repairing and widening the Roads from the South End of Newton Abbott to the Passage Way in Kinswear opposite Clifton Dartmouth Hardness, and from the End of a Lane leading out of the Turnpike Road between Newton Abbott and Totness towards Abbotts Kenswell to Five Lanes, and from Langvers Barn to the said Turnpike Road between Newton Abbott and Totnes, and from Galmpton Warborough to Monk's Bridge and Brixham Quay, and from Langvers Barn to the North End of Paington Town, all in the County of Devon.
Devon and Dorset (Axminster) Turnpike Trust	1754	27 Geo. 2. c. 32	Axminster Roads Act 1754; An Act for repairing and widening the Road from a certain Entrenchment on Askerswell Hill, opposite to Chilcomb Farm through the Town of Bridport, to Penn Inn, and from Bridport aforesaid to the Town of Beamister, in the County of Dorset, and also the Road from Penn Inn aforesaid, through the Town of Axminster, to the Work-house at the East End of the Town of Honiton, in the County of Devon.
Exeter Turnpike Trust	1753	26 Geo. 2. c. 74	Exeter Roads Act 1753; An Act for amending several Roads leading from the City of Exeter.
Exmouth Turnpike Trust; Exmouth Road Turnpike Trust	1832	2 & 3 Will. 4. c. lii	Lympstone and Exmouth Turnpike Road Act 1832; An Act for making and maintaining a Turnpike Road from Burnt House in the Parish of Lympstone in the County of Devon to Exmouth in the same County.
Great Torrington Turnpike Trust	1765	5 Geo. 3. c. 58	Great Torrington Roads Act 1765; An Act for repairing, widening, and keeping in Repair, several Roads in and near Great Torrington, in the County of Devon.
Honiton Turnpike Trust	1757	31 Geo. 2. c. 43	Dorset and Devon Roads Act 1757; An Act for repairing and widening several Roads, in the Counties of Dorset and Devon, leading to and through the Borough of Lyme Regis.
Honiton and Ilminster Turnpike Trust	1807	47 Geo. 3 Sess. 1. c. vi	Road from Upottery to Horton Act 1807; An Act for repairing and improving the Road from the Honiton Turnpike Road, near Yard Farm, in the Parish of Upottery, in the County of Devon, to the Ilminster Turnpike Road, near the Village of Horton, in the Parish of Ilminster, in the County of Somerset.
Honiton and Sidmouth Turnpike Trust	1816	56 Geo. 3. c. xxxii	Gittisham and Sidmouth Road Act 1816; An Act for repairing and improving the Road from the Lyme Turnpike Road, in the Parish of Gittisham, to Sidmouth, in the County of Devon.
Kingsbridge and Dartmouth Turnpike Trust	1824	5 Geo. 4. c. xxxi	Roads from Kingsbridge to Dartmouth Act 1824; An Act for making and maintaining certain Roads from Kingsbridge to Dartmouth, Modbury, Salcombe and other Places in the South Part of the County of Devon.
Modbury Turnpike Trust	1758	32 Geo. 2. c. 68	Devon Roads (No. 2) Act 1758; An Act for repairing and widening the Road from Modbury, through the Town of Plympton, to the North End of Lincotta Lane in the County of Devon.
Moretonhampstead Turnpike Trust	1772	12 Geo. 3. c. 93	Devon Roads (No.2) Act 1772; An Act for repairing and widening the Road from the Exeter Turnpike at Reedy Gate, in the Parish of Dunsford, in the County of Devon, to Cherry Brook, in the Forest of Dartmoore, in the said County.
Newton Bushell Turnpike Trust	1760	1 Geo. 3. c. 34	Devon Roads Act 1760; An Act for repairing and widening the Road from the East End of West Tap-house Lane to the Borough of Liskeard, and from thence to Coomb Row House; and also the Road from the said Borough of Liskeard to Crafthole, and from thence to Crimble Passage and Tar Point, and from Crafthole aforesaid to Saint German's Beacon; in the Counties of Cornwall and Devon.
Okehampton Turnpike Trust	1759	33 Geo. 2. c. 36	Okehampton Roads Act 1759; An Act for repairing several Roads leading to the Town of Oakhampton, in the County of Devon.
Plymouth and Exeter Road Turnpike Trust	1820	1 Geo. 4. c. xxi	Plymouth and Exeter Road Act 1820; An Act to improve certain Parts of the Line of Road between the Borough of Plymouth and the City of Exeter, through Ashburton and Chudleigh, in the County of Devon.
Plymouth and Tavistock Turnpike Trust	1804	44 Geo. 3. c. xvi	Roads from Tavistock to Plymouth and from Manadon Gate Act 1804; An Act for the better amending and repairing of the roads leading from the lower market-house in Tavistock, to Old Town Gate, in the borough of Plymouth, and from Manadon Gate to the Old Pound near Plymouth Dock, in the county of Devon.
Plymouth Turnpike Trust; Plymouth (Eastern) Turnpike Trust	1757	31 Geo. 2. c. 51	Devon Roads Act 1757; An Act for repairing the High Road leading from Brent Bridge, in the County of Devon, to Gasking Gate, in or near the Borough of Plymouth, in the said County.
Sidmouth to Cullompton Turnpike Trust	1844	7 & 8 Vict. c. xlix	Sidmouth and Collumpton Turnpike Act 1844; An Act for making and maintaining a Turnpike Road from Sidmouth to Collumpton, and also to or near to Hele Mill in the Parish of Bradninch, all in the County of Devon.
South Molton Turnpike Trust	1758	32 Geo. 2. c. 45	South Molton Roads Act 1758; An Act for repairing, widening, and rendering safe and commodious, several Roads leading from the Town of Southmolton, in the County of Devon.
Stonehouse Turnpike Trust	1784	24 Geo. 3. Sess. 2. c. 67	Devon Roads (No. 2) Act 1784; An Act for repairing and widening the Road from the Shambles, in the Borough of Plymouth, in the County of Devon, through Franckfort Gate to Stonehouse Bridge, and from the West End of the said Bridge to the Inner Barrier Gate next the Playhouse, in the Parish of Stoke Damarel, in the said County; for lighting, watching, and watering the said Road; and for regulating the Stands and Fares of Carriages using the same.
Taunton Turnpike Trust	1751	25 Geo. 2. c. 54	Taunton Roads Act 1751; An Act for amending the several Roads leading from the Town of Taunton, in the County of Somerset.
Tavistock Turnpike Trust	1762	2 Geo. 3. c. 50	Devon Roads Act 1762; An Act for repairing, widening, and altering, several Roads leading from Tavistock to Plymouth, and other Places, in the County of Devon.
Tedburn St Mary to Chudleigh Turnpike Trust	1831	1 & 2 Will. 4. c. xxxi	Crediton and Chudleigh Turnpike Road Act 1831; An Act for making and maintaining a Turnpike Road from the South End of Mitford Bridge in the Parish of Tedburn Saint Mary to Chudleigh Bridge, and from Crockham Bridge to the Exeter Turnpike Road in Chudleigh, all in the County of Devon.
Teignmouth and Dawlish Turnpike Trust	1823	4 Geo. 4. c. xliv	East Teignmouth and Exminster Turnpike Road Act 1823; An Act for making and maintaining a Turnpike Road from East Teignmouth, through Dawlish, Starcross and Kenton, to communicate with the Exeter Turnpike Road in the Parish of Exminster, all in the County of Devon.
Tiverton Turnpike Trust	1757	31 Geo. 2. c. 49	Tiverton Roads Act 1757; An Act for amending several Roads leading from the Town of Tiverton, in the County of Devon.
Totnes and Bridgetown-Pomeroy Turnpike Trust	1758	32 Geo. 2. c. 52	Devon Roads Act 1758; An Act for amending, widening, and keeping in Repair, the Road from the Hollow Way on the West Side of Lord Clifford's Park Gate, where the Exeter Turnpike ends, to a Place called Biddaford, in the County of Devon.

== Dorset ==
Trust	Founded	Initial act	
Trust	Founded	Citation	Title
Abbotsbury and Bridport Turnpike Trust	1777	17 Geo. 3. c. 103	Dorset Roads Act 1777; An Act for amending, widening, and keeping in Repair, the Road leading from Crookhill, in the Parish of Chickrell, to the Turnpike Road leading from Bridport to Bridport Harbour, and several other Roads therein mentioned, in the County of Dorset.
Blandford and Poole Turnpike Trust	1767	7 Geo. 3. c. 82	Dorset and Somerset Roads Act 1766; An Act to explain, alter, and amend, an Act for repairing and widening several Roads leading from between the Second and Third Mile Stones on the Turnpike Road between the Town and County of Poole and Winborn Minster in the County of Dorset, to Bratton Corner in the County of Somerset; and for repairing and widening the Road from the Turnpike Road in Brainston, to or near a House called Fontleroy's Farm House in the County of Dorset.
Blandford and Wimborne Turnpike Trust	1765	5 Geo. 3. c. 102	Dorset and Somerset Roads Act 1765; An Act for repairing and widening several Roads leading from between the Second and Third Mile Stones on the Turnpike Road between the Town and County of Poole and Winborne Minister in the County of Dorset, to Bratton Corner in the County of Somerset.
Bridport Turnpike Trust	1754	27 Geo. 2. c. 32	Axminster Roads Act 1754; An Act for repairing and widening the Road from a certain Entrenchment on Askerswell Hill, opposite to Chilcomb Farm through the Town of Bridport, to Penn Inn, and from Bridport aforesaid to the Town of Beamister, in the County of Dorset, and also the Road from Penn Inn aforesaid, through the Town of Axminster, to the Work-house at the East End of the Town of Honiton, in the County of Devon.
Bridport Turnpike Trust	1799	39 Geo. 3. c. xxxiii	First District; Bridport Roads Act 1799; An act to continue for twenty-one years, and from thence to the end of the then next session of parliament, the term, and to alter, enlarge, and repeal some of the provisions, of two acts, passed in the twenty-seventh year of the reign of King George the Second, and in the fifth year of the reign of his present Majesty, so far as the said acts relate to the repairing of the roads from an intrenchment on Askerwell Hill, through Bridport to Penn Inn, from Bridport to Beaminser, from the north end of the south street of Bridport Harbour, from the north turnpike gate at Beaminster to Beaminster Wood, otherwise Wood Common, and to Lehham's Water, all in the county of Dorset.
Bridport Turnpike Trust	1819	59 Geo. 3. c. lxxxviii	Second District; Roads to and from Bridport Act 1819; An Act for repairing, widening, improving and maintaining in Repair the several Roads leading to and from the Town of Bridport, and for making a new Line of Road to communicate with the same.
Bridport and Broadwindsor Turnpike Trust	1828	9 Geo. 4. c. xix	Roads to Join Crewkerne Turnpike Road (Dorset and Somerset) Act 1828; An Act for making and maintaining a Turnpike Road from the Bridport Turnpike Road at Allington, through Broadwindsor and Drimpton in the County of Dorset, to the Crewkerne Turnpike Road at or near Clapton Bridge, and also from Hewish Toll Gate to the Crewkerne Turnpike Road at or near Roundham Corner in the Parish of Crewkerne in the County of Somerset.
Cerne Abbas Turnpike Trust	1824	5 Geo. 4. c. xxx	Roads to and from Cerne Abbas Act 1824; An Act for repairing, improving and maintaining several Roads leading to and from Cerne Abbas in the County of Dorset.
Dorchester and Wool Turnpike Trust	1769	9 Geo. 3. c. 47	Dorset Roads Act 1769; An Act for amending, widening, altering, clearing, and keeping in Repair, several Roads leading from the Borough of Dorchester, in the County of Dorset; and for repealing so much of an Act, passed in the Sixth Year of His present Majesty's Reign, as relates to the repairing the Road leading from Wool to the said Borough.
Harnham, Blandford and Dorchester Turnpike Trust	1756	29 Geo. 2. c. 54	Wiltshire and Dorset Roads Act 1756; An Act for repairing and widening the Road from the Top of Harnham Hill, near the City of New Sarum, in the County of Wilts, through the Towns of Blandford Forum and Dorchester, to a certain Intrenchment on Askerwell Hill in the County of Dorset.
Lyme Regis Turnpike Trust	1757	31 Geo. 2. c. 43	Dorset and Devon Roads Act 1757; An Act for repairing and widening several Roads, in the Counties of Dorset and Devon, leading to and through the Borough of Lyme Regis.
Maiden Newton Turnpike Trust	1778	18 Geo. 3. c. 95	Somerset and Dorset Roads Act 1778; An Act for amending, widening, turning, altering and keeping in Repair, the Roads from Whistle Bridge, in the Parish of Barwick, in the County of Somerset, to the Turnpike Road in the Parish of Charminster, in the County of Dorset; and from the Cross in the Town of Maiden Newton, to a Stream of Water in the Parish of South Perrott, in the County of Dorset; and from a Place called Furzmoor Gate, in the Parish of Broad Winsor, to Lenham's Water, in the Parish of Beamister; and from Bugler's Corner, in the Town of Beamister, to the Dorsetshire Inn, in the Parish of Woolcombe; and from Upsydling Ewe Leaze, to the Town of Cerne Ahbas; and from the Town of Frampton, to join the Western Turnpike Road near Steepleton, in the said County of Dorset.
Poole Turnpike Trust	1756	29 Geo. 2. c. 52	Poole Roads Act 1756; An Act for repairing and widening several Roads leading from a Gate called Poole Gate, in the Town and County of Poole.
Puddletown and Wimborne Turnpike Trust; Wimborne and Puddletown Turnpike Trust	1841	4 & 5 Vict. c. xxiii	Wimborne Minster and Piddletown Turnpike Road (Dorset) Act 1841; An Act for making a Turnpike Road from Wimborne Minster in the County of Dorset to Piddletown in the same County, with certain Branches therefrom.
Shaftesbury and Blandford Turnpike Trust; Shaftesbury and New Road to Blandford Turnpike Trust	1753	26 Geo. 2. c. 60	Wiltshire, Dorset and Somerset Roads Act 1753; An Act for repairing and widening the Road from the Top of White Sheet Hill, in the Parish of Donhead Saint Andrew, in the County of Wilts, through the Towns of Shaftesbury, Milborne Port, and Sherborne, in the Counties of Dorset and Somerset, to The Halfway-house, in the Parish of Nether otherwise Lower Compton, in the said County of Dorset, and several other Roads near the Towns of Shaftesbury and Sherborne aforesaid.
Sherborne Turnpike Trust	1753	26 Geo. 2. c. 60	Wiltshire, Dorset and Somerset Roads Act 1753; An Act for repairing and widening the Road from the Top of White Sheet Hill, in the Parish of Donhead Saint Andrew, in the County of Wilts, through the Towns of Shaftesbury, Milborne Port, and Sherborne, in the Counties of Dorset and Somerset, to The Halfway-house, in the Parish of Nether otherwise Lower Compton, in the said County of Dorset, and several other Roads near the Towns of Shaftesbury and Sherborne aforesaid.
Vale of Blackmoor Turnpike Trust	1767	7 Geo. 3. c. 82	Dorset and Somerset Roads Act 1766; An Act to explain, alter, and amend, an Act for repairing and widening several Roads leading from between the Second and Third Mile Stones on the Turnpike Road between the Town and County of Poole and Winborn Minster in the County of Dorset, to Bratton Corner in the County of Somerset; and for repairing and widening the Road from the Turnpike Road in Brainston, to or near a House called Fontleroy's Farm House in the County of Dorset.
Vale of Blackmoor Turnpike Trust	1831	1 & 2 Will. 4. c. xxx	Vale of Blackmoor Turnpike Roads Act 1831; An Act to continue and amend an Act of the Fifth Year of His late Majesty, for repairing the Roads from Durweston Bridge to Caundle Bishop, and other Roads, in the Counties of Dorset and Somerset, so far as relates to the Vale of Blackmoor Turnpike Roads.
Wareham Turnpike Trust	1766	6 Geo. 3. c. 92	Wareham and Purbeck Roads Act 1766; An Act for amending, widening, altering, clearing, and keeping in Repair, several Roads, leading from the Market Cross in the Town of Wareham, and in Purbeck, in the County of Dorset.
Weymouth Backwater Bridge and Road Turnpike Trust	1857	20 & 21 Vict. c. ci	Backwater Bridge and Road Act 1857; An Act for making a Bridge across the River Backwater near Weymouth, and a Turnpike Road, and other Works in connexion therewith, in the County of Dorset; and for other Purposes.
Weymouth, Melcombe Regis and Dorchester Turnpike Trust	1760	1 Geo. 3. c. 24	Dorset Roads Act 1760; An Act for repairing and widening several Roads leading to and through the Towns of Weymouth and Melcombe Regis and Dorchester, in the County of Dorset.
Yeovil Turnpike Trust	1753	26 Geo. 2. c. 69	Somerset Roads Act 1753; An Act for repairing and widening the Road from The Halfway-house, in the Parish of Lower Compton, in the County of Dorset, through the Towns of Yeovil, Crewkerne, and Chard, to the East End of the Town of Axminster, in the County of Devon, and several other Roads round the said Town of Yeovil, in the County of Somerset.

== Gloucestershire ==
Trust	Founded	Initial act		Route	
Trust	Founded	Citation	Title	From	To
Berkeley and Dursley Turnpike Trust	1725	12 Geo. 1. c. 24	Gloucestershire Roads Act 1725; An Act for repairing the Road from the City of Gloucester to Stone, and also the Roads to and near Berkeley, Dursley, Wootten Under Edge, Stroud, and Sodbury, in the County of Gloucester.		
Berkeley, Dursley, Wotton Under Edge, Frocester and Caincross Turnpike Trust	1779	19 Geo. 3. c. 118	Gloucester and Wilts Roads Act 1779; An Act for amending the Road from the Nine Mile Stone on the Bristol Road, at or near a Place called The Clay Pits, to or near the Chapel at Stone; and also the Roads to and near Berkeley, Dursley, Wotton under Edge, Stroud and Sodbury; and several other Roads in the Counties of Gloucester and Wilts.		
Bibury and Dancy's Fancy Turnpike Trust; Bibury Turnpike Trust	1753	26 Geo. 2. c. 70	Oxford and Gloucester Roads Act 1753; An Act for repairing and widening the Road from the Hand and Post in Upton Field, in the Parish of Burford, in the County of Oxford, through the several Parishes within mentioned, to a Place in the Parish of Preston, in the County of Gloucester, called Dancy's Fancy.		
Bristol Turnpike Trust	1726	13 Geo. 1. c. 12	Bristol Roads Act 1726; An Act for amending the several Roads leading from the City of Bristol.		
Broadway to Mickleton Turnpike Trust; Mickleton and Broadway Turnpike Trust	1824	5 Geo. 4. c. xxviii	Broadway and Mickleton Road Act 1824; An Act for repairing the Road leading from the Worcester Turnpike Road, in the Village of Broadway in the County of Worcester, to the Stratford-upon-Avon Turnpike Road, in the Village of Mickleton in the County of Gloucester.		
Burford to Preston Turnpike Trust					
Cainscross Turnpike Trust	1725	12 Geo. 1. c. 24	Gloucestershire Roads Act 1725; An Act for repairing the Road from the City of Gloucester to Stone, and also the Roads to and near Berkeley, Dursley, Wootten Under Edge, Stroud, and Sodbury, in the County of Gloucester.		
Campden and Clifford Turnpike Trust	1818	58 Geo. 3. c. lxxii	Road from Chipping Camden to Old Stratford Act 1818; An Act for repairing the Road from Chipping Campden, in the County of Gloucester, to Clifford Side Gate in the Parish of Old Stratford, in the County of Warwick.		
Chapel-on-the-Heath and Bourton-on-the-Hill Turnpike Trust	1730	4 Geo. 2. c. 23	Oxford and Gloucester Roads Act 1730; An Act for repairing the Road leading from Chappel on the Heath, in the County of Oxon, to the Quarry above Bourton on the Hill, in the County of Gloucester.		
Cheltenham Turnpike Trust	1785	25 Geo. 3. c. 125	Cheltenham Roads Act 1785; An Act for amending the Roads from a Place called Piff's Elm in the Tewkesbury Turnpike Road through Cheltenham to Elston Church, and from thence to Coombend Beeches, in the Road from Cirencester to Gloucester, and from the Market House in Cheltenham to the Burford Turnpike Road at a Place called Pewsdon Ash, and from Cheltenham to the Road from Gloucester to London, at or near a House called Kilkenny, and from the Direction Post in Bembridge Field, through Birdlip, to join the Road from Gloucester to Bath, at or near Painswick, and at a House called the Harrow, all in the County of Gloucester.		
Cheltenham and Gloucester Turnpike Trust	1809	49 Geo. 3. c. xxix	Cheltenham to Gloucester Road Act 1809; An Act for making and maintaining a Road from the First small Bridge or Culvert which crosses the present Turnpike Road from Cheltenham to Gloucester, on the Gloucester Side of Staverton Bridge, to join the same Turnpike Road in the Town of Cheltenham in the County of Gloucester.		
Cheltenham and Painswick Turnpike Trust	1820	1 Geo. 4. c. xvi	Road from Cheltenham to Prinknash Act 1820; An Act for making and maintaining a Road from the Town of Cheltenham to join the present Turnpike Road from Cheltenham to Painswick, at or near to Prinknash Park Wall, in the County of Gloucester.		
Cheltenham and Tewkesbury Turnpike Trust					
Chipping Campden Turnpike Trust	1817	57 Geo. 3. c. v	Road from Cross Hands to Halford Bridge Act 1817; An Act for repairing the Road from the Cross Hands, on the Worcester and Oxford Turnpike Road, to Halford Bridge, and other Roads therein mentioned, in the Counties of Gloucester, Warwick and Worcester.		
Cirencester Turnpike Trust; Cirencester Roads Turnpike Trust	1726	13 Geo. 1. c. 11	Cirencester Roads Act 1726; An Act for repairing the Roads leading from Cirencester Town's-end to St. John's Bridge, in the County of Gloucester.		
Cirencester and Bath Turnpike Trust	1742	16 Geo. 2. c. 22	Gloucester Roads (No. 2) Act 1742; An Act for repairing the Road leading from the Town of Cirencester in the County of Gloucester, to a Place called The Monument, upon Lansdown, in the same County.		
Cirencester and Wootton Bassett Turnpike Trust	1810	50 Geo. 3. c. clxxiv	Road from Cirencester to Wootton Bassett Act 1810; An Act for making and maintaining a Turnpike Road from Cirencester in the County of Gloucester to Wootton Bassett in the County of Wilts, and a Branch of Road from the Malmesbury and Cirencester Turnpike Road near Crudwell Church to communicate with the Turnpike Road leading from Cricklade to Malmesbury at or near Minety Common.		
Cirencester to Birdlip Turnpike Trust; Cirencester (Gloucester District) Turnpike Trust	1746	20 Geo. 2. c. 23	Gloucester Roads Act 1746; An Act for repairing the Road leading from Cirencester, in the County of Gloucester, to Birdlips Hill, in the said County.		
Cirencester to Stroud Turnpike Trust; Cirencester (Stroud District) Turnpike Trust	1751	25 Geo. 2. c. 13	Gloucester Roads Act 1751; An Act for repairing the Road from the Town of Cirencester, to the Town of Stroud, and that Part of Rodborough Hill which leads to Dudbridge, and also the Road leading from Cirencester towards Bisley, so far as the Bottom of Gulph Hill, all in the County of Gloucester.		
Cirencester to Tetbury Turnpike Trust					
Cleeve and Evesham Turnpike Trust	1810	50 Geo. 3. c. ii	Road from Cheltenham to Bishop's Cleve Act 1810; An Act for making and maintaining a Road from Albion Street in the Town of Cheltenham in the County of Gloucester, to Bunch Lane in or near the Village of Bishop's Cleve, in the said County, to join the Turnpike Road leading from the Town of Evesham in the County of Worcester, to the said Town of Cheltenham.		
Coldharbour Turnpike Trust	1757	31 Geo. 2. c. 65	Gloucestershire Roads (No. 3) Act 1757; An Act for repairing and widening the Roads from Tetbury to the Gates on the West of Simond's Hall Down, and from the Turnpike Gate at the Top of Frocester Hill to the Turnpike Road from Cirencester towards Bath, and from the Field called Bouldoun Sleight to the End of a Lane adjoining to a Road from Horsley to Tetbury near Tiltup's Inn, and from the Market House in Tetbury to the Turnpike Road on Minchin Hampton Common, and from the said Road in Minchin Hampton Field unto the Turnpike Road from Cirencester to Stroud near Burnt Ash, and from the said Turnpike Road to Tayloe's Mill Pond in Chalford Bottom, and through Hide to the Bottom of The Bourne Hill, in the County of Gloucester.		
Crickley Hill to Frogg Mill Turnpike Trust					
Elton Turnpike Trust	1725	12 Geo. 1. c. 13	Gloucester and Hereford Roads Act 1725; An Act for repairing and widening the Roads from the City of Gloucester to the City of Hereford.		
Elton Turnpike Trust	1833	3 & 4 Will. 4. c. lxxv	Roads through Huntley from Gloucester Act 1833		
Forest of Dean Turnpike Trust	1796	36 Geo. 3. c. 131	Dean Forest Roads Act 1796; An act for amending, widening, improving, and keeping in repair, several roads in and through his Majesty's forest of Dean, and the waste lands thereto belonging, in the county of Gloucester, and for turning, altering, and changing the course of the said roads, and for making several new roads in the said forest to lead to certain places in and near the same; and also for amending, widening, and keeping in repair, certain roads leading from the said forest to and through several parts of the parish of Newland, adjoining the said forest, and also leading from the bottom of a place called The Viney Hill in the said forest, to and through certain parts of the parishes of Lidney and Awre, adjoining the said forest, in the said county of Gloucester.		
Foss and Cross (Stow on the Wold) Turnpike Trust	1755	28 Geo. 2. c. 47	Gloucester and Warwick Roads Act 1755; An Act for repairing and widening the Road from The Hand and Post at the Top of Burford Lane in the County of Gloucester to Stow on the Wold, and from thence to Halford Bridge in the County of Warwick, and also the Road from The Cross Hands on Salford Hill to The Hand and Post in the Parish of Dowdeswell in the County of Gloucester.		
Frocester Turnpike Trust	1725	12 Geo. 1. c. 24	Gloucestershire Roads Act 1725; An Act for repairing the Road from the City of Gloucester to Stone, and also the Roads to and near Berkeley, Dursley, Wootten Under Edge, Stroud, and Sodbury, in the County of Gloucester.		
Haw Bridge and Roads Turnpike Trust	1823	4 Geo. 4. c. i	Haw Passage (Gloucestershire) Severn Bridge and Roads Act 1823; An Act for building a Bridge over the River Severn, at or near the Haw Passage, in the County of Gloucester, and for making convenient Roads thereto.		
Huntley and Mitcheldean Turnpike Trust	1725	12 Geo. 1. c. 13	Gloucester and Hereford Roads Act 1725; An Act for repairing and widening the Roads from the City of Gloucester to the City of Hereford.		
Huntley and Mitcheldean Turnpike Trust	1833	3 & 4 Will. 4. c. lxxv	Roads through Huntley from Gloucester Act 1833		
Kingsholm Turnpike Trust; Cheltenham and Kingsholm Turnpike Trust	1756	29 Geo. 2. c. 58	Gloucester Roads Act 1756; An Act for repairing and widening the Roads leading from the City of Gloucester towards Cheltenham and Tewkesbury, in the County of Gloucester.		
Kingswood Turnpike Trust	1827	7 & 8 Geo. 4. c. c	Wooton-under-edge and Wickwar Roads (Gloucestershire, Wiltshire) Act 1827; An Act for making and maintaining a Turnpike Road from Wooton-under-Edge through Kingswood to Wickwar, and Branch Roads therefrom, all in the Counties of Gloucester and Wilts.		
Lightpill and Birdlip Turnpike Trust	1800	39 & 40 Geo. 3. c. xliii	Rodburgh and Birdlip Road Act 1800; An Act for making and maintaining a Road from, or from near, Lightpill Gate, on the Road leading from Bath to Dudbridge, in the Parish of Rodborough, to join the Turnpike Road from Painswick to Cheltenham, at or near to Birdlip, in the Parishes of Brimpsfield and Cowley, or one of them, all in the County of Gloucester.		
Maisemore Turnpike Trust	1725	12 Geo. 1. c. 13	Gloucester and Hereford Roads Act 1725; An Act for repairing and widening the Roads from the City of Gloucester to the City of Hereford.		
Maisemore Turnpike Trust	1746	20 Geo. 2. c. 31	Gloucester and Hereford Roads Act 1746; An Act for continuing the Term, and enlarging the Powers, granted by an Act passed in the Twelfth Year of His late Majesty's Reign, intituled, "An Act for repairing and widening the Roads from the City of Gloucester to the City of Hereford," and for repairing other Roads in the County of Gloucester.		
Malmesbury Turnpike Trust	1798	38 Geo. 3. c. lxvi	Roads from Tetbury, Malmesbury, Farringdon and Sherstone Act 1798; An Act for more effectually repairing, widening, and improving the Road from Tetbury, in the County of Gloucester, to and through Malmesbury, to the Churchway in Lower Stanton Field, in the County of Wilts, there to join the Turnpike Road leading from Chippenham Bridge to Lower Stanton aforefaid; and from Malmesbury to the Turnpike Road at or near Jackament's Bottom, in the said County of Gloucester; and also the Road from Farringdon to Cricklade, from thence to Malmesbury, and to the Turnpike Road at Acton Turville; and also from Sherstone to the Turnpike Road leading from Tetbury to Bath; and for making, maintaining, widening, and improving several other Roads communicating therewith.		
Marshfield Turnpike Trust	1726	13 Geo. 1. c. 13	Chippenham Roads Act 1726; An Act for repairing the Road leading from Studley Bridge, through Chippenham, in the County of Wilts, to the Top of Toghill, in the County of Gloucester.		
Minchinhampton, Tetbury and Bisley Turnpike Trust	1757	31 Geo. 2. c. 65	Gloucestershire Roads (No. 3) Act 1757; An Act for repairing and widening the Roads from Tetbury to the Gates on the West of Simond's Hall Down, and from the Turnpike Gate at the Top of Frocester Hill to the Turnpike Road from Cirencester towards Bath, and from the Field called Bouldoun Sleight to the End of a Lane adjoining to a Road from Horsley to Tetbury near Tiltup's Inn, and from the Market House in Tetbury to the Turnpike Road on Minchin Hampton Common, and from the said Road in Minchin Hampton Field unto the Turnpike Road from Cirencester to Stroud near Burnt Ash, and from the said Turnpike Road to Tayloe's Mill Pond in Chalford Bottom, and through Hide to the Bottom of The Bourne Hill, in the County of Gloucester.		
Nailsworth, Woodchester and Dudbridge Turnpike Trust	1780	20 Geo. 3. c. 84	Gloucester Roads (No. 2) Act 1780; An Act for making and maintaining a Road from Tiltup's Inn, in the Parish of Horsley, to join the Turnpike Road leading from Cirencester to Dudbridge, at or near Dudbridge, in the Parish of Rodborough; and from the Bridge at Nailsworth, in the Parish of Avening to Minchinhampton Common; and several other Roads therein mentioned, all in the County of Gloucester.		
Newent Turnpike Trust	1802	42 Geo. 3. c. xlv	Newent Roads Act 1802; An Act for making and maintaining a Turnpike Road from a Place called The Crown Hill, in the Town of Newent, in the County of Gloucester, to join the Turnpike Road leading from the City of Hereford, towards Newnham, in the County of Gloucester; and also another Road leading from the Bottom of Kilcott Hill, in the Parish of Newent aforesaid, towards the Town and Forest of Deane, in the County of Gloucester, with a Branch from the same towards Ledbury, in the County of Hereford.		
Newnham to Little Dean Turnpike Trust	1783	23 Geo. 3. c. 104	Gloucester Roads Act 1783; An Act for amending and widening the Road from the Passage or Ferry over the River Severn at Newnham in the County of Gloucester, through the Parishes of Newnham and Little Dean, to a Place called Saint White's, adjoining His Majesty's Forest of Dean, in the said County.		
Northgate Turnpike Trust	1697	9 Will. 3. c. 18	Birdlip and Crickley Hill Road Act 1697; An Act for repairing the Highways from the Towne of Birdlipp and the Top of Crickley Hill in the County of Gloucester to the City of Gloucester.		
Northgate Turnpike Trust	1722	9 Geo. 1. c. 31	Gloucestershire Highways Act 1722; An Act for repairing the Highways from the City of Gloucester to the Top of Birdlip Hill (being the Road to London), and from the Foot of the said Hill to the Top of Crickly Hill (being the Road to Oxford); and to oblige those concerned in the Receipt or Payment of any Monies, by virtue of an Act of the Ninth and Tenth Years of His late Majesty King William, touching the repairing the said Highways, to accompt for the same to the Trustees appointed by this Act.	Gloucester Northgate	Top of Birdlip Hill
Northgate Turnpike Trust	1722	9 Geo. 1. c. 31	Gloucestershire Highways Act 1722; An Act for repairing the Highways from the City of Gloucester to the Top of Birdlip Hill (being the Road to London), and from the Foot of the said Hill to the Top of Crickly Hill (being the Road to Oxford); and to oblige those concerned in the Receipt or Payment of any Monies, by virtue of an Act of the Ninth and Tenth Years of His late Majesty King William, touching the repairing the said Highways, to accompt for the same to the Trustees appointed by this Act.	Little Witcombe	Top of Crickley Hill
Over Turnpike Trust	1769	9 Geo. 3. c. 50	Gloucester and Hereford Roads Act 1769; An Act for enlarge the Term and Powers of an Act, made in the Thirty-third Year of King George the Second, for repairing and widening the Road from Gloucester towards Hereford, and other Roads therein mentioned; and for amending several other Roads near or adjoining to some of the said Roads.	Over	Newent
Over Turnpike Trust	1769	9 Geo. 3. c. 50	Gloucester and Hereford Roads Act 1769; An Act for enlarge the Term and Powers of an Act, made in the Thirty-third Year of King George the Second, for repairing and widening the Road from Gloucester towards Hereford, and other Roads therein mentioned; and for amending several other Roads near or adjoining to some of the said Roads.	Gloucester	Westbury-on-Severn
Painswick Turnpike Trust	1778		Gloucester to Stroud Road Act 1778; An Act for repairing and widening the Road from the City of Gloucester to the Town of Stroud, in the County of Gloucester.		
Pucklechurch Turnpike Trust	1756	29 Geo. 2. c. 56	Gloucester and Wiltshire Roads Act 1756; An Act for amending and keeping in Repair the Roads leading from Mead Brook, which divides the Parishes of Pucklechurch and Mangotsfield, in the County of Gloucester, to Christian Malford Bridge in the County of Wilts, and also from Pucklechurch aforesaid to certain Coal Mines in the said Parish.		
Redbrook to St Arvans Turnpike Trust					
Sodbury Division Turnpike Trust	1751	25 Geo. 2. c. 59	Wiltshire and Gloucester Roads Act 1751; An Act for repairing and widening the Roads leading from Chippenham Bridge in the County of Wilts, to the Top of Togg Hill in the County of Gloucester, and from Chippenham Bridge aforesaid to the Top of Old Sodbury Hill, in the said County of Gloucester.		
Southgate Turnpike Trust	1721	12 Geo. 1. c. 24	Gloucestershire Roads Act 1725; An Act for repairing the Road from the City of Gloucester to Stone, and also the Roads to and near Berkeley, Dursley, Wootten Under Edge, Stroud, and Sodbury, in the County of Gloucester.		
Stroud and Bisley Turnpike Trust	1823	4 Geo. 4. c. xiv	Stroud and Bisley Turnpike Road Act 1823; An Act for making and maintaining a Turnpike Road from Stroud to Bisley, in the County of Gloucester.		
Stroud and Chalford Turnpike Trust; Stroud to Sapperton Turnpike Trust	1814	54 Geo. 3. c. lxxx	Roads from Stroud Act 1814; An Act for making and maintaining certain Roads from the Town of Stroud, and several other Places therein mentioned, all in the County of Gloucester.		
Stroud and Gloucester (thru Pitchcombe) Turnpike Trust	1818	58 Geo. 3. c. i	Stroud and Gloucester Road Act 1818; An Act for making and maintaining a Road from the Town of Stroud, in the County of Gloucester, through Pitchcomb, into the City of Gloucester.		
Stroud, Caincross and Minchinhampton Turnpike Trust; Stroud, Cainscross and Minchinhampton Turnpike Trust	1825	6 Geo. 4. c. xxiii	Cainscross and Minchinhampton Turnpike Road Act 1825; An Act for making and maintaining a Turnpike Road from Cainscross through Stroud, over Rodborough and Minchinhampton Commons, to the Town of Minchinhampton, with several Branches therefrom, all in the County of Gloucester.		
Stump Cross Turnpike Trust; Swell, Stump Cross, Winchcomb and Andover Turnpike Trust	1792	32 Geo. 3. c. 146	Gloucester Roads Act 1792; An Act for amending, widening, altering, and repairing the Roads from Swell Wold, in the Parish of Lower Swell, in the County of Gloucester, to or near the Sixth Mile Stone in the Turnpike Road leading from the Borough of Tewkesbury to the Town of Stow, in the same County, and from the North East End of the Swan Lane, in the Parish of Cheltenham, in the same County, to the Turnpike Road leading to Evesham, in the Parish of Sedgeborough, in the County of Worcester, and from the Town of Winchcomb, in the said County of Gloucester, by a Place called Stamp Cross, to or near the Tenth Mile Stone on the said Turnpike Road leading from Tewkesbury to Stow aforesaid.		
Tewkesbury Turnpike Trust	1725	12 Geo. 1. c. 18	Tewkesbury Roads Act 1725; An Act for repairing the several Roads therein mentioned, leading into the Town of Tewkesbury, in the County of Gloucester.		
Tewkesbury Severn Bridge and Roads Turnpike Trust	1823	4 Geo. 4. c. ii	Tewkesbury Severn Bridge and Roads Act 1823; An Act for building a Bridge over the River Severn, at or near to the Mythe Hill, within the Parish and near to the Town of Tewkesbury in the County of Gloucester, to the opposite Side of the said River, in the Parish of Bushley in the County of Worcester; and for making convenient Roads and Avenues to communicate with such Bridge, within the Counties of Gloucester and Worcester.		
Winchcombe Turnpike Trust	1792	32 Geo. 3. c. 146	Gloucester Roads Act 1792; An Act for amending, widening, altering, and repairing the Roads from Swell Wold, in the Parish of Lower Swell, in the County of Gloucester, to or near the Sixth Mile Stone in the Turnpike Road leading from the Borough of Tewkesbury to the Town of Stow, in the same County, and from the North East End of the Swan Lane, in the Parish of Cheltenham, in the same County, to the Turnpike Road leading to Evesham, in the Parish of Sedgeborough, in the County of Worcester, and from the Town of Winchcomb, in the said County of Gloucester, by a Place called Stamp Cross, to or near the Tenth Mile Stone on the said Turnpike Road leading from Tewkesbury to Stow aforesaid.		
Wootton Under Edge Turnpike Trust	1725	12 Geo. 1. c. 24	Gloucestershire Roads Act 1725; An Act for repairing the Road from the City of Gloucester to Stone, and also the Roads to and near Berkeley, Dursley, Wootten Under Edge, Stroud, and Sodbury, in the County of Gloucester.		

== Somerset ==
Trust	Founded	Initial act	
Trust	Founded	Citation	Title
Allington to Crewkerne Turnpike Trust; Bridport and Broadwinsor Turnpike Trust	1828	9 Geo. 4. c. xix	Roads to Join Crewkerne Turnpike Road (Dorset and Somerset) Act 1828; An Act for making and maintaining a Turnpike Road from the Bridport Turnpike Road at Allington, through Broadwindsor and Drimpton in the County of Dorset, to the Crewkerne Turnpike Road at or near Clapton Bridge, and also from Hewish Toll Gate to the Crewkerne Turnpike Road at or near Roundham Corner in the Parish of Crewkerne in the County of Somerset.
Bath Turnpike Trust	1707	6 Ann. c. 42	Bath Highway, Streets, etc. Act 1707; An Act for repairing, amending, and enlarging the Highways, between the Top of Kingsdown Hill and the City of Bath, and also several other Highways leading to and through the said City; and for cleansing, paving, and lightening the Streets, and regulating the Chairmen there.
Black Dog Turnpike Trust	1751	25 Geo. 2. c. 12	Wiltshire Roads (No. 2) Act 1751; An Act for repairing and widening the Road from the Town of Warminster, in the County of Wilts, to the City of Bath, in the County of Somerset, and also the Road from the Town of Frome, in the said County of Somerset, to the Town of Beckington, in the same County, and for repairing the Road from Heytesbury to Anstrow Hill, in the County of Wilts.
Bridgwater Turnpike Trust	1729	3 Geo. 2. c. 34	Bridgwater Roads Act 1729; An Act for repairing several Roads leading into the Town of Bridgewater, in the County of Somerset.
Bristol Turnpike Trust	1726	13 Geo. 1. c. 12	Bristol Roads Act 1726; An Act for amending the several Roads leading from the City of Bristol.
Bruton Turnpike Trust	1756	29 Geo. 2. c. 50	Bruton Roads Act 1756; An Act for repairing and widening several Roads leading from and near the Town of Brewton, in the County of Somerset.
Chard Turnpike Trust	1753	26 Geo. 2. c. 69	Somerset Roads Act 1753; An Act for repairing and widening the Road from The Halfway-house, in the Parish of Lower Compton, in the County of Dorset, through the Towns of Yeovil, Crewkerne, and Chard, to the East End of the Town of Axminster, in the County of Devon, and several other Roads round the said Town of Yeovil, in the County of Somerset.
Crewkerne Turnpike Trust	1765	5 Geo. 3. c. 61	Crewkerne Roads Act 1765; An Act for repairing, widening, and keeping in Repair, several Roads leading to and from Crewkerne, in the County of Somerset.
Frome Turnpike Trust	1757	30 Geo. 2. c. 39	Frome Roads Act 1757; An Act for repairing and widening several Roads leading to, through, and from, the Town of Frome in the County of Somerset; and for giving further Powers to the Trustees in an Act passed in the Twenty-fifth Year of His present Majesty's Reign, for repairing the Roads from the Town of Warminster, in the County of Wilts, to the City of Bath, in the County of Somerset, and other Roads therein mentioned.
High Ham Turnpike Trust; High Ham and Ashcott Turnpike Trust	1826	7 Geo. 4. c. xxxix	Roads through High Ham and Ashcott (Somerset) Act 1826; An Act for more effectually repairing and improving the Roads leading from Pick's Hill, near the Town of Langport Eastover, in the County of Somerset, through High Ham, Ashcott and other Places, to Meare, in the said County.
Honiton Turnpike Trust	1758	31 Geo. 2. c. 43	Dorset and Devon Roads Act 1757; An Act for repairing and widening several Roads, in the Counties of Dorset and Devon, leading to and through the Borough of Lyme Regis.
Honiton and Ilminster Turnpike Trust	1807	47 Geo. 3 Sess. 1. c. vi	Road from Upottery to Horton Act 1807; An Act for repairing and improving the Road from the Honiton Turnpike Road, near Yard Farm, in the Parish of Upottery, in the County of Devon, to the Ilminster Turnpike Road, near the Village of Horton, in the Parish of Ilminster, in the County of Somerset.
Ilchester Turnpike Trust	1753	26 Geo. 2. c. 71	Somerset Roads (No. 2) Act 1753; An Act for repairing and widening the Roads therein mentioned, leading to and from the Towns of Shepton Malet and Ivelchester, in the County of Somerset.
Ilminster Turnpike Trust	1803	43 Geo. 3. c. xxiii	Road from Chard Act 1803; An Act for more effectually amending, widening, and keeping in Repair the Roads from the East End of the Town of Chard to the South End of West Moor, and from the West End of the Yeovil Turnpike Road through Illminster to Kenny Gate, and from the West End of Pease Marsh Lane to Horton Elm, and from Saint Rane Hill to Ilminster, and from White Cross to Chillington Down, and from a Place called Three Oaks, over Ilford Bridges, to Old Way, and from The Cross Keys to Catherine Wheel, in the Parish of Ashill, in the County of Somerset.
Langport, Somerton and Castle Cary Turnpike Trust	1753	26 Geo. 2. c. 92	Somerset Roads (No. 3) Act 1753; An Act for repairing, amending, and widening, the several Roads leading from The Red Post, in the Parish of Fivehead, through the Towns of Langport and Somerton, to Butwell; and also from Curry Rivell to Puckington Lane, and from Cary Bridge to Street Cross, in the County of Somerset.
Martock and South Petherton Turnpike Trust	1760	1 Geo. 3. c. 29	Somerset Roads Act 1760; An Act for repairing and widening the Roads from Dyed Way to Somerton, and from Gawbridge to Tintinbull Fords, and from a Stream of Water called Ford to Cartgate in Martock, in the County of Somerset.
Minehead Roads Turnpike Trust	1765	5 Geo. 3. c. 93	Somerset and Devon Roads Act 1765; An Act for repairing, widening, turning, altering, and keeping in Repair, the Roads leading from the Port Town and Borough of Minehead, through Dunster and Timberscombe, to Hele Bridge, and through the Town of Dulverton, and by the River and Brushford Green, to Exbridge in the County of Somerset, and from thence to Baltham Bridge in the Town of Bampton in the County of Devon; and also the Road leading from the said Port Town and Borough of Minehead, through Carhampton and Bilbrooke, to Harrow Gate in the Parish of Stogumber in the County of Somerset; and also the Road leading from Carhampton aforesaid, through the Town of Watchet in the Parish of Saint Decumans in the County of Somerset, to or near the Village of Rydon, and by Long Cross Barn to the End of the Bridgewater Turnpike Road in the Town of Nether Stowey in the County of Somerset; and also from the said Town of Watchet to Tower Hill in the Village of Wiliton in the said Parish of Saint Decumans; and from the said Town of Watchet, by Way of Five Bells, to Fair Cross, and from thence to Stickle Path, over Brendon Hill, to Robery Lane, and to Bampton, in the said County of Devon.
Radstock Turnpike Trust	1768	8 Geo. 3. c. 53	Somerset Roads Act 1768; An Act for repairing and widening the Road from Buckland Dinham, to the End of the Parish of Timsbury; and also the Road from Midsummer Norton, to the End of the Parish of Norton Saint Phillips; and also the Road from Tucker's Grave, to the Road leading from Wellow, to a Place known by the Name of The Red Post, in the County of Somerset.
Shepton Mallet Turnpike Trust	1753	26 Geo. 2. c. 71	Somerset Roads (No. 2) Act 1753; An Act for repairing and widening the Roads therein mentioned, leading to and from the Towns of Shepton Malet and Ivelchester, in the County of Somerset.
Taunton Turnpike Trust	1751	25 Geo. 2. c. 54	Taunton Roads Act 1751; An Act for amending the several Roads leading from the Town of Taunton, in the County of Somerset.
Tiverton Turnpike Trust	1757	31 Geo. 2. c. 49	Tiverton Roads Act 1757; An Act for amending several Roads leading from the Town of Tiverton, in the County of Devon.
Wedmore Turnpike Trust	1827	7 & 8 Geo. 4. c. v	Ashcott and Rowberrow Hill Road (Somerset) Act 1827; An Act for making and maintaining a Road from Chappel's Corner, in the Parish of Ashcott, to join the Bristol Turnpike Road at or near Rowberrow Hill, all in the County of Somerset.
Wells Turnpike Trust	1753	26 Geo. 2. c. 76	Wells Roads Act 1753; An Act for repairing and widening the Road leading from Pipers Inn in the Parish of Ashcott, in the County of Somerset, to and through Glaston, otherwise Glastonbury, and Wells, to the Direction or White Post in the great Western Road to the City of Bath, and also from Wells to Rush Hill, leading to the City of Bristol.
Wells, Highbridge and Cheddar Turnpike Trust; Wells and Highbridge Turnpike Trust	1841	4 & 5 Vict. c. xcviii	Wells, Highbridge and Cheddar Road Act 1841; An Act for further and more effectually repairing and maintaining certain Turnpike Roads in the Counties of Roxburgh and Dumfries.
West Harptree Turnpike Trust	1793	33 Geo. 3. c. 165	Somerset Roads Act 1793; An Act, for making, amending, diverting, and widening the Roads leading from West Harptry to the Bath and Wells Turnpike Road, at Marksbury; and from Stowey to Chew Magna; and from West Harptry to the Bath Turnpike Road at Emborow; and from West Harptry to Fore Cross, in the Parish of Churchill; and from West Harptry to the Blue Bowl Inn, in Compton Martin; and from Berrington to the Town of Wrington; and from the Nine Elms at North Wedcombe to Coley, in the County of Somerset.
Weston-super-Mare and Worle Turnpike Trust	1840	3 & 4 Vict. c. xxii	Weston-super-Mare and Worle Road Act 1840; An Act for making and maintaining a new Road from the Road at Worle to a Road in the Parish of Kewstoke leading to Locking and Weston-super-Mare in the County of Somerset.
Wincanton Turnpike Trust	1756	29 Geo. 2. c. 49	Wincanton Roads Act 1756; An Act for repairing and widening the Road from the Eighteen Mile Stone beyond Willoughby Hedge, through the Town of Mere, in the County of Wilts, and through Wincanton to Charlton Houthorn, and from thence to Milborn Port, and from Willoughby Hedge aforesaid to the West End of Long Lane in Kilmington, and from Wincanton aforesaid to the Sherborn Turnpike Cross Gate on Cattle Hill, and from Wincanton to Sparkford, in the County of Somerset.
Wiveliscombe Turnpike Trust	1786	26 Geo. 3. c. 135	Wiveliscombe Roads Act 1786; An Act for amending and widening several Roads leading from and through the Town of Wiveliscombe, in the County of Somerset, and other Roads adjoining or near thereto.
Yeovil Turnpike Trust	1753	26 Geo. 2. c. 69	Somerset Roads Act 1753; An Act for repairing and widening the Road from The Halfway-house, in the Parish of Lower Compton, in the County of Dorset, through the Towns of Yeovil, Crewkerne, and Chard, to the East End of the Town of Axminster, in the County of Devon, and several other Roads round the said Town of Yeovil, in the County of Somerset.

== Wiltshire ==
Trust	Founded	Initial act	
Trust	Founded	Citation	Title
Amesbury Turnpike Trust	1762	2 Geo. 3. c. 39	Southampton and Wilts Road Act 1762; An Act for repairing and widening the Roads from Mullen's Pond in the County of Southampton, to the Eighteen Mile Stone from the City of Salisbury, near Willoughby Hedge, and from West Amesbury to Anstlow Hill, and from Amesbury to Fiddleton, and from The New Inn in Amesbury to the End of the Parish leading to Durrington, and from Wily to Cook's House and Landford, and from Beacon Hill to The Nag's Head, and from thence One Mile of the Road leading to Shrewton in the County of Wilts.
Beckhampton Turnpike Trust	1742	16 Geo. 2. c. 10	Wiltshire Roads Act 1742; An Act for repairing the Roads leading from Marlborough through West-Kennet to Shepherds Shard; and from the Hare and Hounds in Beckhampton, to the Top of Cherill Hill; and from the Town of Avebury to the Cross-way at Beckhampton, in the County of Wilts.
Blackdog Turnpike Trust	1751	25 Geo. 2. c. 12	Wiltshire Roads (No. 2) Act 1751; An Act for repairing and widening the Road from the Town of Warminster, in the County of Wilts, to the City of Bath, in the County of Somerset, and also the Road from the Town of Frome, in the said County of Somerset, to the Town of Beckington, in the same County, and for repairing the Road from Heytesbury to Anstrow Hill, in the County of Wilts.
Bradford Turnpike Trust	1751	25 Geo. 2. c. 52	Wiltshire and Somerset Roads (No. 3) Act 1751; An Act for widening and repairing the Road from Combe Bridge in the County of Somerset, to Bradford in the County of Wilts, and from thence through Hilperton, and so far over Ashton Common as to join the Road which leads from Steeple Ashton to Trowbridge, and also the Road leading from Bradford aforesaid to Cockhill Gate, in the said County of Wilts.
Calne Turnpike Trust	1707	6 Ann. c. 26	Wiltshire Highways Act 1706; An Act for repairing the Highways between Sheppard Shord and The Devizes, and between the Top of Ashlington Hill and Rowdford, in the County of Wilts.
Calne, Lyneham and Hillmartin Turnpike Trust	1791	31 Geo. 3. c. 121	Swindon, Calne and Cricklade Roads Act 1791; An Act for amending, widening, and keeping in Repair the Roads leading from Swindon to the Centre of Christian Malford Bridge, and from Calne to Lyneham Green, and from the Direction Post in Long Leaze Lane, near Lydiard Marsh, to Cricklade, in the County of Wilts.
Chippenham Turnpike Trust; Chippenham to Togg Hill Turnpike Trust; Draycot Turnpike Trust	1726	13 Geo. 1. c. 13	Chippenham Roads Act 1726; An Act for repairing the Road leading from Studley Bridge, through Chippenham, in the County of Wilts, to the Top of Toghill, in the County of Gloucester.
Christian Malford to Shillingford Turnpike Trust	1757	31 Geo. 2. c. 66	Wilts and Berks Roads Act 1757; An Act for amending, widening, and keeping in Repair, the Roads leading from Christian Malford Bridge in the County of Wilts, to Shillingford Gate in the County of Berks, and also from Swindon to Lyddenton Wall in the said County of Wilts.
Bradford Turnpike Trust; Combe Bridge to Bradford Turnpike Trust	1751	25 Geo. 2. c. 52	Wiltshire and Somerset Roads (No. 3) Act 1751; An Act for widening and repairing the Road from Combe Bridge in the County of Somerset, to Bradford in the County of Wilts, and from thence through Hilperton, and so far over Ashton Common as to join the Road which leads from Steeple Ashton to Trowbridge, and also the Road leading from Bradford aforesaid to Cockhill Gate, in the said County of Wilts.
Corsham Turnpike Trust; Bradford to Lacock Turnpike Trust	1725	12 Geo. 1. c. 11	Wiltshire Roads (No. 2) Act 1725; An Act for repairing and widening the Road from Horsley Upright Gate, leading down Bowden Hill, in the County of Wilts, to the Top of Kingsdown Hill, in the Parish of Box, in the said County.
Crudwell and Minty Turnpike Trust			
Devizes Turnpike Trust	1797	37 Geo. 3. c. 154	Devizes Roads Act 1797; An Act for completing, widening, and keeping in repair the road from West Lavington, unto and through the town of the Devizes, to the house known by the name of The Green Man, in Seend, in the county of Wilts; and from Rowde Ford, through the Devizes market-place, to join the Beckhampton turnpike road near Wansdyke; and from the east end of the Devizes aforesaid, to the top of Red Hone Hill, in the said county of Wilts.
Draycot or Upper District Turnpike Trust	1756	29 Geo. 2. c. 56	Gloucester and Wiltshire Roads Act 1756; An Act for amending and keeping in Repair the Roads leading from Mead Brook, which divides the Parishes of Pucklechurch and Mangotsfield, in the County of Gloucester, to Christian Malford Bridge in the County of Wilts, and also from Pucklechurch aforesaid to certain Coal Mines in the said Parish.
Draycot or Upper District Turnpike Trust	1831	11 Geo. 4 & 1 Will. 4. c. lxiii	Brighton, Shoreham and Lancing Road and New Shoreham Bridge Act 1830; An Act for more effectually repairing and improving the Road from Brighton to Shoreham, for building a Bridge over the River Adur, at New Shoreham, and for making a Road to Lancing, and a Branch Road therefrom, all in the County of Sussex.
Everley Turnpike Trust	1762	2 Geo. 3. c. 60	Weyhill and Lyde Way Road Act 1762; An Act for repairing and widening the Road from the Turnpike Road at Weyhill in the County of Southampton, to the Turnpike Road at Lyde Way in the County of Wilts.
Fisherton, Wilton etc. Turnpike Trust	1760	1 Geo. 3. c. 37	Wilts Roads Act 1760; An Act for amending, widening, and keeping in Repair, the Road leading from Fisherton Bridge to the Turnpike Road at Willoughby Hedge in West Knoyle, and from Wilton Bridge to the Turnpike Road at the West End of Heytesbury, and also the Road from the Turnpike Road at the Top of Red Hone Hill in the Parish of Urshfont to the Mile Stone at the Western End of Fisherton Street, in the County of Wilts.
Holt and Wraxall Turnpike Trust	1762	2 Geo. 3. c. 59	Wilts Roads (No. 3) Act 1762; An Act for repairing, widening, turning, and shortening, the Road leading from the Turnpike Road on Farrad's Common in the Parish of Bradford, through Holt and Melksham, to Homan's Stile in the Parish of Laycock in the County of Wilts.
Lechlade to Swindon Turnpike Trust	1792	32 Geo. 3. c. 153	Gloucester and Wiltshire Roads Act 1792; An Act for repairing, widening, turning, and altering the Road leading from the Town of Burford, in the County of Oxford, to Leachlade, in the County of Gloucester, and for making a Road from thence to the River Isis or Thames; for building a Bridge across the said River, and for making a Road from thence to join the present Road leading from Leachlade to Inglesham; and for repairing, widening, turning, and altering the said last mentioned Road, to and through the Town of Highworth, in the County of Wilts, to the present Turnpike Road leading from Cricklade to Swindon, in the same County.
Malmesbury Turnpike Trust	1756	29 Geo. 2. c. 77	Berkshire Roads Act 1756; An Act for repairing and widening the Road from the Town of Farringdon in the County of Berks, to the Town of Cricklade, and from thence to the Town of Malmsbury, in the County of Wilts, and the Road from thence to join the Turnpike Road at Acton Turville in the County of Gloucester, and also the Road from Tetbury in the said County, through Malmsbury aforesaid, to Chippenham Bridge,[ad] and the Road from Sherston to join the Turnpike Road leading from Tetbury to Bath.
Marlborough and Froxfield Turnpike Trust	1725	12 Geo. 1. c. 8	Newbury to Marlborough Road Act 1725; An Act for repairing the Highways from Speenham Land, adjoining to Newbury, in the County of Berks, to Marlborough, in the County of Wilts.
Marlborough and Sailsbury Turnpike Trust	1762	2 Geo. 3. c. 49	Wilts Roads Act 1762; An Act for amending and widening the Road from the Turnpike Road at or near the Town of Swindon to the North End or Side of the Town of Marlborough, and from the said Town of Marlborough to the Village of Everley, in the County of Wilts.
Marlborough and Swindon Turnpike Trust	1819	59 Geo. 3. c. lxxxiii	Road from Marlborough to Cote Act 1819; An Act for making and maintaining a Road from Marlborough, to the present Turnpike Road at or near Coate, in the Parish of Liddington, in the County of Wilts.
Meadbrook to Christian Malford Turnpike Trust	1756	29 Geo. 2. c. 56	Gloucester and Wiltshire Roads Act 1756; An Act for amending and keeping in Repair the Roads leading from Mead Brook, which divides the Parishes of Pucklechurch and Mangotsfield, in the County of Gloucester, to Christian Malford Bridge in the County of Wilts, and also from Pucklechurch aforesaid to certain Coal Mines in the said Parish.
Melksham Turnpike Trust	1757	30 Geo. 2. c. 41	Wiltshire Roads Act 1757; An Act for amending, widening, and keeping in Repair, the Road from the Turnpike Road at the Bottom of Shaw Hill in the Parish of Melksham, through Googe's Lane, Corsham, Biddestone, and West Yatton, to the Turnpike Road at Upper Combe, in the Parish of Castle Combe, in the County of Wilts.
New Sarum to Dorchester Turnpike Trust	1756	29 Geo. 2. c. 54	Wiltshire and Dorset Roads Act 1756; An Act for repairing and widening the Road from the Top of Harnham Hill, near the City of New Sarum, in the County of Wilts, through the Towns of Blandford Forum and Dorchester, to a certain Intrenchment on Askerwell Hill in the County of Dorset.
Sarum and Eling Turnpike Trust	1753	26 Geo. 2. c. 66	Wiltshire and Southampton Roads Act 1753; An Act for repairing and widening the Roads leading from Lobcomb Corner, in the Parish of Winterslow, to Harnham Bridge, in the County of Wilts; and from the West Corner of Saint Anne's Street, in the City of New Sarum, to the Parishes of Landford and Brook, and from thence to Ealing; and from Landford aforesaid, through Ower and Testwood, to Ealing aforesaid, in the County of Southampton.
Seend to Box Turnpike Trust			
Swindon and Christian Malford Turnpike Trust	1791	31 Geo. 3. c. 121	Swindon, Calne and Cricklade Roads Act 1791; An Act for amending, widening, and keeping in Repair the Roads leading from Swindon to the Centre of Christian Malford Bridge, and from Calne to Lyneham Green, and from the Direction Post in Long Leaze Lane, near Lydiard Marsh, to Cricklade, in the County of Wilts.
Swindon and Cold Harbour Turnpike Trust	1791	31 Geo. 3. c. 121	Swindon, Calne and Cricklade Roads Act 1791; An Act for amending, widening, and keeping in Repair the Roads leading from Swindon to the Centre of Christian Malford Bridge, and from Calne to Lyneham Green, and from the Direction Post in Long Leaze Lane, near Lydiard Marsh, to Cricklade, in the County of Wilts.
Swindon and Hungerford Turnpike Trust	1814	54 Geo. 3. c. l	Road from Swindon to Ramsbury Act 1814; An Act for making and maintaining a Turnpike Road from Swindon to or near Knighton Farm, in the Parish of Ramsbury, and from Liddington to the Road leading from Swindon to Marlborough, in the County of Wilts.
Swindon and Marlborough Turnpike Trust	1762	2 Geo. 3. c. 49	Wilts Roads Act 1762; An Act for amending and widening the Road from the Turnpike Road at or near the Town of Swindon to the North End or Side of the Town of Marlborough, and from the said Town of Marlborough to the Village of Everley, in the County of Wilts.
Swindon, Calne and Cricklade Turnpike Trust	1791	31 Geo. 3. c. 121	Swindon, Calne and Cricklade Roads Act 1791; An Act for amending, widening, and keeping in Repair the Roads leading from Swindon to the Centre of Christian Malford Bridge, and from Calne to Lyneham Green, and from the Direction Post in Long Leaze Lane, near Lydiard Marsh, to Cricklade, in the County of Wilts.
Trowbridge Turnpike Trust; Seend to Trowbridge Turnpike Trust	1751	25 Geo. 2. c. 17	Wiltshire and Somerset Roads Act 1751; An Act for repairing the Road leading from The Green Man, in the Chapelry of Seend, in the County of Wilts, through Trowbridge, to a Place called White Trough, in the Parish of Trowbridge, in the same County, and from thence, by Road Church, to Beckington, in the County of Somerset.
Warminster Turnpike Trust	1726	13 Geo. 1. c. 16	Warminster Roads Act 1726; An Act for repairing the several Roads leading from the Town of Warminster, in the County of Wilts.
Warminster to Beckington Turnpike Trust			
West Lavington to Seend Turnpike Trust; West Lavington, Devizes and Seend Turnpike Trust	1750	24 Geo. 2. c. 9	Wiltshire Roads Act 1750; An Act for repairing the Road leading from West Lavington to The Devizes, and from The Devizes to Seend, in the County of Wilts.
Westbury Turnpike Trust	1757	31 Geo. 2. c. 68	Wilts Roads Act 1757; An Act for amending the Road leading from Pengate in the Parish of Westbury in the County of Wilts, to Latchet's Bridge near the East End of Market Lavington, and also the Road leading from Market Lavington Down to the Turnpike Road near Dewey's Water, and also the Road leading from Bolesborough to Studley Lane End, and also the Road leading from Yarnbrook to the Turnpike Road at Melksham in the said County of Wilts.
Whitesheet Turnpike Trust; Hurdcot to Barford Turnpike Trust	1788	28 Geo. 3. c. 86	Wiltshire Roads Act 1788; An Act for amending, widening, and keeping in Repair the Road from the Bottom of Whitesheet Hill through Hurdcot, to the Wilton Turnpike Road at or near Barford in the County of Wilts.
Winterslow to Harnham Bridge Turnpike Trust	1753	26 Geo. 2. c. 66	Wiltshire and Southampton Roads Act 1753; An Act for repairing and widening the Roads leading from Lobcomb Corner, in the Parish of Winterslow, to Harnham Bridge, in the County of Wilts; and from the West Corner of Saint Anne's Street, in the City of New Sarum, to the Parishes of Landford and Brook, and from thence to Ealing; and from Landford aforesaid, through Ower and Testwood, to Ealing aforesaid, in the County of Southampton.
Wooton Basset and Marlborough Turnpike Trust	1809	49 Geo. 3. c. xc	Wootton Bassett Road Act 1809; An Act for repairing and maintaining the Road from Wotton Basset in the County of Wilts to the Two Mile Stone on the Turnpike Road from Swindon to Marlborough in the said County.
