= Newton Bushell Turnpike Trust =

Former road operator in England

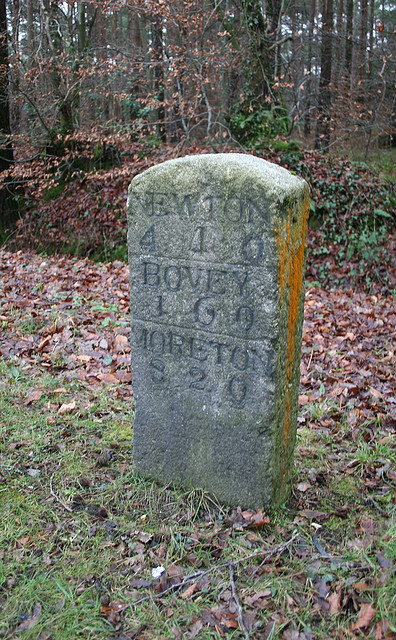
- Milestone of the Newton Bushell Turnpike Trust at Bovey Heath
- Formation: 1760; 266 years ago
- Dissolved: November 1872; 153 years ago
- Purpose: Creation and maintenance of turnpike roads
- Region served: Devon, United Kingdom

The Newton Bushell Turnpike Trust was a turnpike trust company in Devon, England which built and maintained trunk road connections from the West of Newton Bushell (now part of Newton Abbot) between 1760 and November 1872. The trust built several roads, including what is now the A382 from Newton to Whiddon Down and the A383 to Ashburton.

== History ==
The trust was formed in 1760, and on 16 December 1760, placed its first petition to Parliament to take control of, widen, and repair the road between Newton Bushell and Ashburton. This led to the passage through Parliament of the Devon Roads Act 1760 (1 Geo. 3. c. 34), setting the legal framework to create the turnpike.

The following year, in 1761 they made "petition of the Gentlemen, Clergy, and Freeholders of the several Parishes of Teingrafe, Bovey Tracey, Lustley, North Bovey, and Moreton Hampstead" on 19 January 1761, due their road being "incommodious, having a very troublesome ascent and descent, that has scarcely ever been considered a public road". This caused the building of the turnpike road from Newton Bushell (now Newton Abbot) to Moretonhampstead.

In 1826, a further act of Parliament, the Newton Bushell, South Bovey and Moretonhampstead Roads Act 1826 (7 Geo. 4. c. xcii), was made to both repair and improve the road from Newton to Moretonhampstead, as well as extend it to Whiddon Down through the village of Sandy Park, where it would join with the turnpike of the Okehampton Turnpike Trust.

In 1834, the trust was taken to court and it was found that they had not fulfilled their duties under the acts of Parliament, by not completing all of the road as directed, and were therefore ordered to remove the Moreton Northern and Whiddon Down Gates.

The trust sub-let operation of the toll gates to a contractor, and then used the money to pay for road repairs, which was done by tender.

The trust ceased to exist following the expiry of all of its acts of Parliament in November 1872.

== Routes ==
The trust's routes were:

- from Newton Bushell to Ashburton, via Highweek
- from Newton Bushell to Whiddon Down, via Bovey Travey, Moretonhampstead, and Sandy Park
- from Bovey Tracey to Chudleigh Knighton

== Tollhouses ==
The turnpike trust had ten tollhouses along their routes (as well as three on their branch to Ashburton, now the A383), of which three remain standing. These were at:

- Forches Cross, Newton Abbot (demolished 2009)
- Claybere, Newton Abbot
- Bovey Tracey (still standing)
- Bradleyford, Bovey Tracey
- King's Bridge, Moretonhampstead (still standing)
- Northern gate, Moretonhampstead
- Whiddon Down (still standing)
- Whiddon North – towards North Tawton and Okehampton turnpike (still standing)
- Highweek (village)
- Highweek (Mile End)
- Greenaway (Highweek)
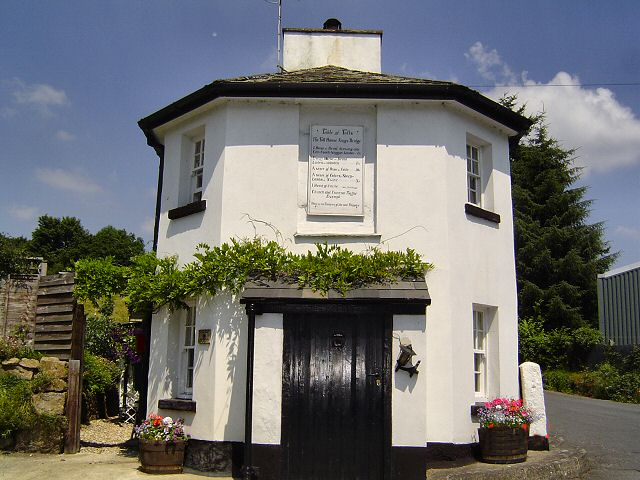
Tollhouse at Moretonhampstead

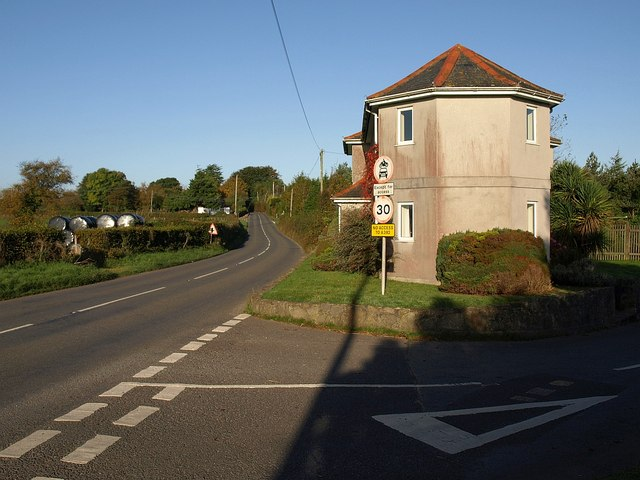
Tollhouse at Whiddon Down

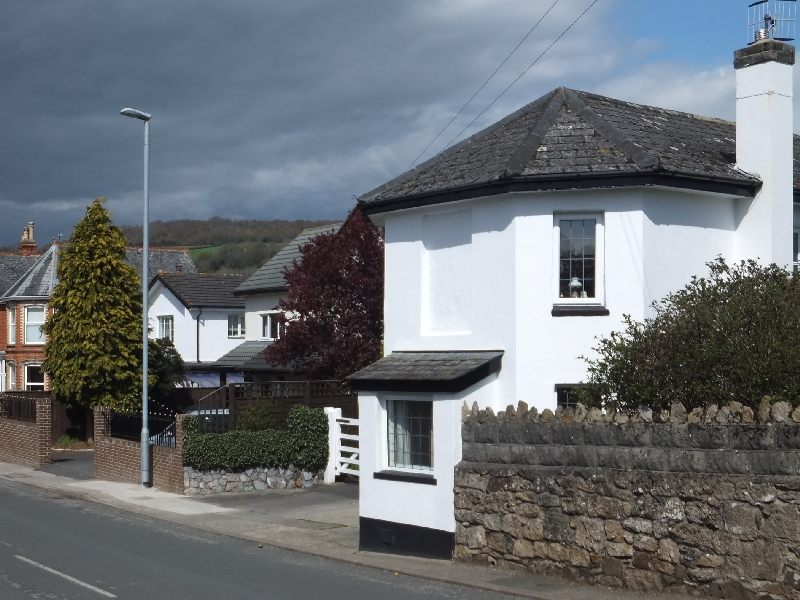
Tollhouse at Bovey Tracey

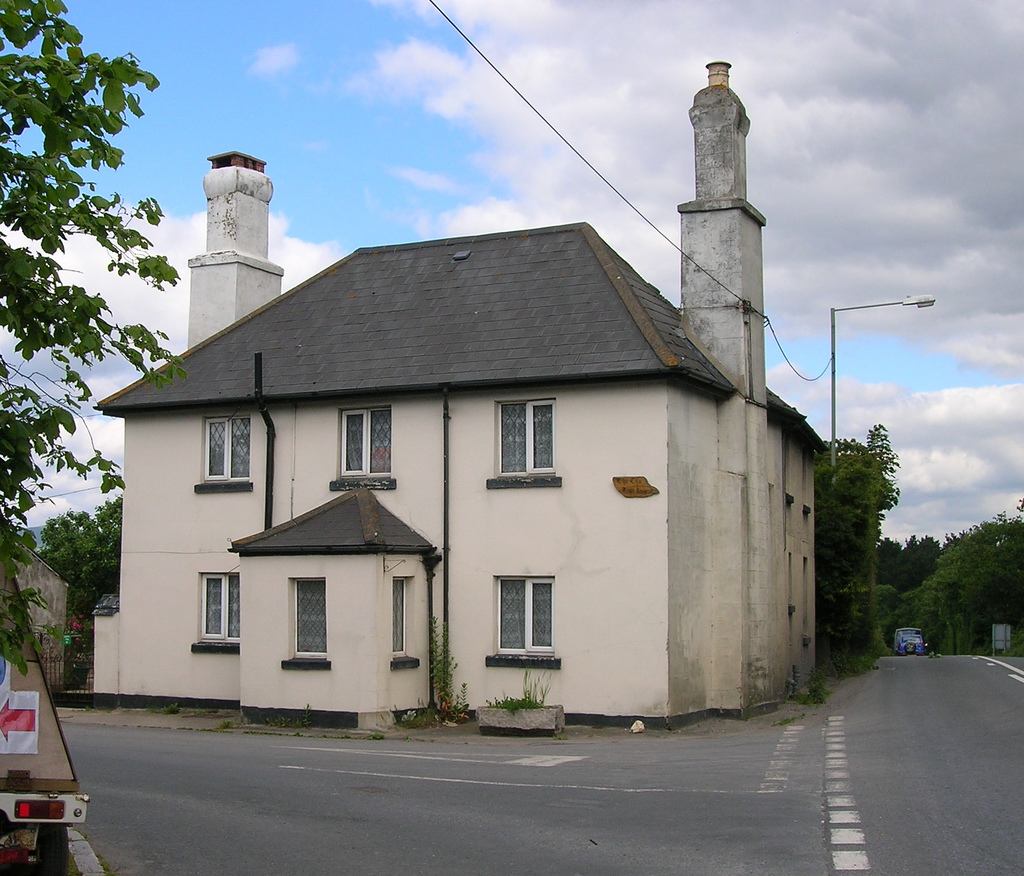
Tollhouse at Forches Cross, demolished in 2009

== Milestones ==
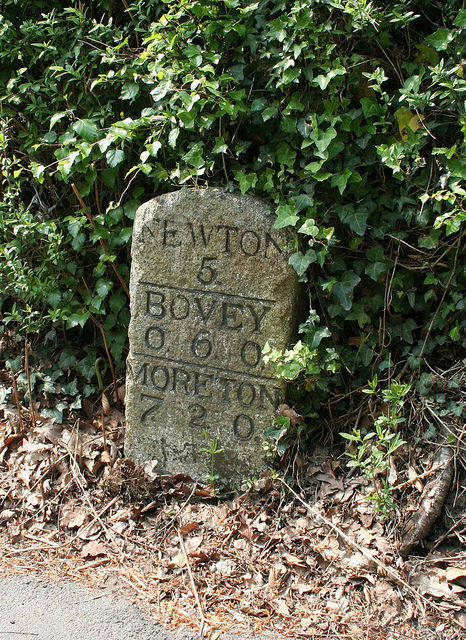
Newton detail granite milestone at Bovey Tracey

The trust installed distinctive milestones on their roads, with distances carved onto granite and showing the distance to the destinations in miles, furlongs, and poles.
