= List of acts of the Parliament of Great Britain from 1760 =

This is a complete list of acts of the Parliament of Great Britain for the year 1760.

For acts passed until 1707, see the list of acts of the Parliament of England and the list of acts of the Parliament of Scotland. See also the list of acts of the Parliament of Ireland.

For acts passed from 1801 onwards, see the list of acts of the Parliament of the United Kingdom. For acts of the devolved parliaments and assemblies in the United Kingdom, see the list of acts of the Scottish Parliament, the list of acts of the Northern Ireland Assembly, and the list of acts and measures of Senedd Cymru; see also the list of acts of the Parliament of Northern Ireland.

The number shown after each act's title is its chapter number. Acts are cited using this number, preceded by the year(s) of the reign during which the relevant parliamentary session was held; thus the Union with Ireland Act 1800 is cited as "39 & 40 Geo. 3. c. 67", meaning the 67th act passed during the session that started in the 39th year of the reign of George III and which finished in the 40th year of that reign. Note that the modern convention is to use Arabic numerals in citations (thus "41 Geo. 3" rather than "41 Geo. III"). Acts of the last session of the Parliament of Great Britain and the first session of the Parliament of the United Kingdom are both cited as "41 Geo. 3".

Acts passed by the Parliament of Great Britain did not have a short title; however, some of these acts have subsequently been given a short title by acts of the Parliament of the United Kingdom (such as the Short Titles Act 1896).

Before the Acts of Parliament (Commencement) Act 1793 came into force on 8 April 1793, acts passed by the Parliament of Great Britain were deemed to have come into effect on the first day of the session in which they were passed. Because of this, the years given in the list below may in fact be the year before a particular act was passed.

== 1 Geo. 3 ==
The eighth session of the 11th Parliament of Great Britain, which met from 26 October 1760 until 19 March 1761.

This session was also traditionally cited as 1 G. 3.

=== Public acts ===
Short title	Citation	Royal assent
Long title
Civil List Act 1760 (repealed)	1 Geo. 3. c. 1	9 December 1760
An Act for the Support of his Majesty's Household, and of the Honour and Dignity of the Crown of Great Britain. (Repealed by Statute Law Revision Act 1867 (30 & 31 Vict. c. 59))
Land Tax Act 1760 (repealed)	1 Geo. 3. c. 2	9 December 1760
An Act for granting an Aid to His Majesty, by a Land Tax, to be raised in Great Britain, for the Service of the Year One Thousand Seven Hundred and Sixty-one. (Repealed by Statute Law Revision Act 1867 (30 & 31 Vict. c. 59))
Malt Duties etc. Act 1760 (repealed)	1 Geo. 3. c. 3	9 December 1760
An Act for continuing, and granting to His Majesty, certain Duties upon Malt, Mum, Cyder, and Perry, for the Service of the Year One Thousand Seven Hundred and Sixty-one. (Repealed by Statute Law Revision Act 1867 (30 & 31 Vict. c. 59))
Importation Act 1760 (repealed)	1 Geo. 3. c. 4	23 December 1760
An Act to continue, for a limited Time, the Importation of Salted Beef, Pork, and Butter, from Ireland. (Repealed by Statute Law Revision Act 1867 (30 & 31 Vict. c. 59))
South Sea Company Act 1760 (repealed)	1 Geo. 3. c. 5	23 December 1760
An Act to enable His Majesty to be Governor of The South Sea Company. (Repealed by Statute Law Revision Act 1867 (30 & 31 Vict. c. 59))
Mutiny Act 1760 (repealed)	1 Geo. 3. c. 6	23 December 1760
An Act for punishing Mutiny and Desertion; and for the better Payment of the Army and their Quarters. (Repealed by Statute Law Revision Act 1867 (30 & 31 Vict. c. 59))
National Debt Act 1760 (repealed)	1 Geo. 3. c. 7	20 January 1761
An Act for granting to His Majesty an additional Duty upon Strong Beer and Ale; and for raising the Sum of Twelve Millions, by Way of Annuities and a Lottery, to be charged on the said Duty; and for further encouraging the Exportation of Strong Beer and Ale. (Repealed by Statute Law Revision Act 1870 (33 & 34 Vict. c. 69))
Marine Mutiny Act 1760 (repealed)	1 Geo. 3. c. 8	20 January 1761
An Act for the Regulation of His Majesty's Marine Forces while on Shore. (Repealed by Statute Law Revision Act 1867 (30 & 31 Vict. c. 59))
Colonial Trade Act 1760 (repealed)	1 Geo. 3. c. 9	3 March 1761
An Act to continue an Act made in the Sixth Year of the Reign of His late Majesty King George the Second, intituled, "An Act for the better securing and encouraging the Trade of His Majesty's Sugar Colonies in America." (Note: Trade of Sugar Colonies Act 1732 (6 Geo. 2. c. 13)) (Repealed by Statute Law Revision Act 1867 (30 & 31 Vict. c. 59))
Taxation Act 1760 (repealed)	1 Geo. 3. c. 10	3 March 1761
An Act for extending an Act, intituled, "An Act to discontinue, for a limited Time, the Duties payable on Tallow imported from Ireland," to Hogs Lard and Grease. (Repealed by Statute Law Revision Act 1867 (30 & 31 Vict. c. 59))
Duchy of Cornwall Act 1760 (repealed)	1 Geo. 3. c. 11	3 March 1761
An Act to enable His Majesty to make Leases and Copies of Offices, Lands, and Hereditaments, Parcel of His Dutchy of Cornwall, or annexed to the same; and for other Purposes therein mentioned. (Repealed by Statute Law Revision Act 1948 (11 & 12 Geo. 6. c. 62))
Indemnity Act 1760 (repealed)	1 Geo. 3. c. 12	3 March 1761
An Act to indemnify Persons who have omitted to qualify themselves for Offices and Employments; and to indemnify Justices of the Peace, Deputy Lieutenants, Officers of the Militia, and others, who have omited to register, or to deliver in, their Qualifications within the Time limited by Law; and for giving further Time for those Purposes. (Repealed by Statute Law Revision Act 1867 (30 & 31 Vict. c. 59))
Justices' Qualification Act 1760 (repealed)	1 Geo. 3. c. 13	3 March 1761
An Act to amend an Act passed in the Eighteenth Year of the Reign of King George the Second, (Note: Justices Qualification Act 1744 (18 Geo. 2. c. 20)) concerning the Qualification of Justices of the Peace; and for other Purposes therein mentioned. (Repealed by Statute Law Revision Act 1948 (11 & 12 Geo. 6. c. 62))
Courts-martial, East Indies Act 1760 (repealed)	1 Geo. 3. c. 14	3 March 1761
An Act to extend the Provisions relating to the holding of Courts Martial, and to the Punishment of Offences committed in The East Indies, contained in the Act made in the Twenty-seventh Year of His late Majesty's Reign, intituled, "An Act for punishing Mutiny and Desertion of Officers and Soldiers in the Service of the United Company of Merchants of England trading to The East Indies; and for the Punishment of Offences committed in The East Indies, or at the Island of Saint Helena," (Note: Mutiny, East Indies Act 1754 (27 Geo. 2. c. 9)) to the said Company's Settlement of Fort Marlborough, and to such other principal Settlements wherein the said Company may be hereafter empowered to hold Courts of Judicature. (Repealed by Statute Law Revision Act 1867 (30 & 31 Vict. c. 59))
Grants to George Keith Act 1760 (repealed)	1 Geo. 3. c. 15	3 March 1761
An Act to enable His Majesty to grant unto George Keith, late Earl Marischall, a Sum therein limited, out of the Principal Money and Interest now remaining due to the Publick on Account of the Purchase-money of certain Parts of the forfeited Estates of the said late Earl. (Repealed by Statute Law Revision Act 1867 (30 & 31 Vict. c. 59))
Coinage Duties Act 1760 (repealed)	1 Geo. 3. c. 16	19 March 1761
An Act to continue the Duties for Encouragement of the Coinage of Money. (Repealed by Statute Law Revision Act 1867 (30 & 31 Vict. c. 59))
Insolvent Debtors Relief Act 1760 (repealed)	1 Geo. 3. c. 17	19 March 1761
An Act for Relief of Insolvent Debtors. (Repealed by Statute Law Revision Act 1867 (30 & 31 Vict. c. 59))
Supply, etc. Act 1760 (repealed)	1 Geo. 3. c. 18	19 March 1761
An Act for granting to His Majesty a certain Sum of Money out of the Sinking Fund; and for applying certain Monies remaining in the Exchequer, for the Service of the Year One Thousand Seven Hundred and Sixty-one. (Repealed by Statute Law Revision Act 1867 (30 & 31 Vict. c. 59))
Supply, etc. (No. 2) Act 1760 (repealed)	1 Geo. 3. c. 19	19 March 1761
An Act for enabling His Majesty to raise the Sum of One Million, for the Uses and Purposes therein mentioned; and for further appropriating the Supplies granted in this Session of Parliament; and for exempting any Annuities granted, or to be granted, to the Royal Family, from the Payment of Taxes. (Repealed by Statute Law Revision Act 1867 (30 & 31 Vict. c. 59))
Supply, etc. (No. 3) Act 1760 (repealed)	1 Geo. 3. c. 20	19 March 1761
An Act for enabling His Majesty to raise a certain Sum of Money, towards paying off and discharging the Debt of the Navy, and towards Naval Services, for the Year One Thousand Seven Hundred and Sixty-one; and for allowing further Time for making Affidavits of the Execution of Articles or Contracts of Clerks to Attornies or Solicitors, and filing thereof. (Repealed by Statute Law Revision Act 1867 (30 & 31 Vict. c. 59))
Game Act 1760 (repealed)	1 Geo. 3. c. 21	19 March 1761
An Act for the better Preservation of the Game in that Part of Great Britain called Scotland; and for repealing Part of an Act, passed in the Twenty-fourth Year of the Reign of His late Majesty, (Note: Game (Scotland) Act 1750 (24 Geo. 2. c. 34)) for the better Preservation of the Game in that Part of Great Britain called Scotland. (Repealed by Game (Scotland) Act 1772 (13 Geo. 3. c. 54))
Militia Pay Act 1760 (repealed)	1 Geo. 3. c. 22	19 March 1761
An Act for applying the Money granted in this Session of Parliament towards defraying the Charge of the Pay of the Militia of that Part of Great Britain called England when unembodied, and of the Cloathing of the Part of the said Militia now unembodied, for One Year, beginning the Twenty-fifth Day of March One Thousand Seven Hundred and Sixty-one. (Repealed by Statute Law Revision Act 1867 (30 & 31 Vict. c. 59))
Commissions and Salaries of Judges Act 1760 (repealed)	1 Geo. 3. c. 23	19 March 1761
An Act for rendering more effectual the Provisions in an Act made in the Twelfth and Thirteenth Years of the Reign of His late Majesty King William the Third, intituled, "An Act for the further Limitation of the Crown, and better securing the Rights and Liberties of the Subject," (Note: Act of Settlement 1700 (12 & 13 Will. 3. c. 2)) relating to the Commissions and Salaries of Judges. (Repealed by Civil Procedure Acts Repeal Act 1879 (42 & 43 Vict. c. 59))
Dorset Roads Act 1760 (repealed)	1 Geo. 3. c. 24	23 December 1760
An Act for repairing and widening several Roads leading to and through the Towns of Weymouth and Melcombe Regis and Dorchester, in the County of Dorset. (Repealed by Weymouth, Melcombe Regis and Dorchester Roads Act 1825 (6 Geo. 4. c. c))
Cornwall and Devon Roads Act 1760 (repealed)	1 Geo. 3. c. 25	3 March 1761
An Act for repairing and widening the Road from the East End of West Tap-house Lane to the Borough of Liskeard, and from thence to Coomb Row House; and also the Road from the said Borough of Liskeard to Crafthole, and from thence to Crimble Passage and Tar Point, and from Crafthole aforesaid to Saint German's Beacon; in the Counties of Cornwall and Devon. (Repealed by Liskeard Roads Act 1823 (4 Geo. 4. c. lii) (Note: Cited without a regnal year, as "G 4 c lii", in the Chronological Table of the Statutes.))
London, City Road Act 1760 (repealed)	1 Geo. 3. c. 26	3 March 1761
An Act for making, widening, and repairing, a Road from the North-East Side of the Goswell Street Road, next Islington, in the County of Middlesex, and near to the Road called The New Road, over the Fields and Grounds, to Old Street Road, opposite to The Dog-house Bar, and at and from The Dog-house Bar to the End of Chiswell Street by The Artillery Ground. (Repealed by City Road Act 1824 (5 Geo. 4. c. lxi))
Cornwall Roads Act 1760 (repealed)	1 Geo. 3. c. 27	3 March 1761
An Act for repairing and widening the Road leading from the Eastern End of the Borough of Grampound in the County of Cornwall, through the Towns of Saint Austell and Lostwithiel, and from thence to the East End of The Western Taphouse-Lane in the said County. (Repealed by Grampound, St. Austell and Lostwithiel Road Act 1824 (5 Geo. 4. c. lxxxv))
Exeter (Lighting etc.) Act 1760 (repealed)	1 Geo. 3. c. 28	3 March 1761
An Act for enlightening the Streets within the City of Exeter and Suburbs thereof. (Repealed by Exeter Improvement Act 1810 (50 Geo. 3. c. cxlvi))
Somerset Roads Act 1760 (repealed)	1 Geo. 3. c. 29	3 March 1761
An Act for repairing and widening the Roads from Dyed Way to Somerton, and from Gawbridge to Tintinbull Fords, and from a Stream of Water called Ford to Cartgate in Martock, in the County of Somerset. (Repealed by Somerton District of Roads (Somerset) Act 1823 (4 Geo. 4. c. lxii))
Gloucester and Crickley Hill Road Act 1760 (repealed)	1 Geo. 3. c. 30	3 March 1761
An Act for continuing and amending an Act made in the Sixteenth Year of His late Majesty's Reign, (Note: Gloucester Roads Act 1742 (16 Geo. 2. c. 21)) for repairing the Highways from the City of Gloucester (Note: The North Gate of the City of Gloucester, located on Northgate Street, near the junction with St Aldate Street. 51°52′00″N 2°14′39″W) to the Top of Birdlip Hill, (Note: The top of Birlip Hill is in the village of Birdlip, Gloucestershire. 51°49′41″N 2°06′38″W) and from the Foot of the said Hill (Note: The junction of Cirencester Road and Ermin Way. 51°50′23″N 2°08′27″W) to the Top of Crickley Hill. (Note: The location of the former Air Balloon public house, where the A417 meets the A436. 51°50′37″N 2°05′45″W) (Repealed by Gloucester and Crickley Hill Road Act 1806 (46 Geo. 3. c. l))
Bath Roads Act 1760 (repealed)	1 Geo. 3. c. 31	3 March 1761
An Act to explain and amend so much of an Act passed in the Thirty-second Year of the Reign of His late Majesty, intituled, "An Act to explain, amend, and render more effectual, the Powers granted by several Acts of Parliament, for repairing several Roads leading to the City of Bath, and for amending several other Roads near the said City," (Note: Bath Roads Act 1758 (32 Geo. 2. c. 51)) as directs the laying-out a new Road from the Bridge at Bath to Rush Hill. (Repealed by Bath Roads Act 1793 (33 Geo. 3. c. 144))
Falmouth and Marazion Road Act 1760 (repealed)	1 Geo. 3. c. 32	3 March 1761
An Act for amending and widening the Road leading from the Town of Falmouth in the County of Cornwall, through the Towns of Penryn, Helston, and Marazion, and from thence to and over Marazion River and Bridge, and Two Hundred Feet to the Westward of the said River and Bridge. (Repealed by Falmouth and Marazion Road Act 1823 (4 Geo. 4. c. lxxviii))
Leeds to Sheffield Road Act 1760 (repealed)	1 Geo. 3. c. 33	3 March 1761
An Act to amend and render more effectual an Act passed in the Thirty-first Year of the Reign of His late Majesty King George the Second, intituled, "An Act for repairing the Road from Leeds to Sheffield, in the County of York." (Note: Leeds and Wakefield Road Act 1757 (31 Geo. 2. c. 63)) (Repealed by Wakefield and Sheffield Road Act 1813 (53 Geo. 3. c. xlviii) and Wakefield and Sheffield Road Act 1830 (11 Geo. 4 & 1 Will. 4. c. xxii))
Devon Roads Act 1760 (repealed)	1 Geo. 3. c. 34	3 March 1761
An Act for repairing and widening the Road from Traveller's Rest in the Parish of Ashburton to Newton Bushel, and from thence to Forches otherwise Forger's Cross, in the Parish of Highweek, in the County of Devon. (Repealed by Newton Bushell, South Bovey and Moretonhampstead Roads Act 1826 (7 Geo. 4. c. xcii))
Sacred Gate and Patrington Creek Road Act 1760 (repealed)	1 Geo. 3. c. 35	3 March 1761
An Act for amending the Road from Sacred Gate in the Parish of Thorngumbald to Pattrington Creek or Haven; and from the Guide Post in Winestead to Frodingham Gate in or near Widow Branton's Farm, in the County of York; and for scouring and cleansing the said Creek or Haven. (Repealed by Road from Sacred Gate to Patrington Creek (Yorkshire) Act 1824 (5 Geo. 4. c. lxxxvi) (Note: Incorrectly cited as "5 G 4 c lxxvi" in the Chronological Table of the Statutes.))
Warwick Roads Act 1760 (repealed)	1 Geo. 3. c. 36	3 March 1761
An Act for discontinuing the Use of a Road in the Parish of Great Packington in the County of Warwick; and for preventing the Trustees appointed to put in Execution an Act passed in the Thirty-third Year of His late Majesty's Reign, (Note: Chester to Birmingham Road Act 1759 (33 Geo. 2. c. 51)) for repairing the Road from Stone Bridge to Castle Bromwich, from erecting a Gate or Turnpike between Stone Bridge and the Place where the Road turns off to Coleshill, in the County of Warwick. (Repealed by Welsh Harp and Stonebridge, and Castle Bromwich and Birmingham Roads Act 1823 (4 Geo. 4. c. cxxi))
Wilts Roads Act 1760 (repealed)	1 Geo. 3. c. 37	3 March 1761
An Act for amending, widening, and keeping in Repair, the Road leading from Fisherton Bridge (Note: Fisherton Bridge, carrying Fisherton Street across the River Avon, Salisbury, Wiltshire. 51°04′08″N 1°47′54″W) to the Turnpike Road at Willoughby Hedge (Note: Willoughby Hedge is at the junction of the A303 and B3089 roads, north of West Knoyle, Wiltshire. 51°06′04″N 2°11′15″W) in West Knoyle, and from Wilton Bridge (Note: Burden's Ball Bridge, Wilton, Wiltshire. 51°04′59″N 1°51′36″W) to the Turnpike Road at the West End of Heytesbury, (Note: The junction of the A36 and B390 roads west of Heytesbury, Wiltshire. 51°10′52″N 2°05′37″W) and also the Road from the Turnpike Road at the Top of Red Hone Hill (Note: Redhorn Hill, south of Urchfont, Wiltshire. 51°18′09″N 1°54′59″W) in the Parish of Urshfont to the Mile Stone at the Western End of Fisherton Street, (Note: Junction of Fisherton Street, Devizes Street and Wilton Street, Salisbury, Wiltshire. 51°04′19″N 1°48′18″W) in the County of Wilts. (Repealed by Roads from Fisherton, Wilton and Heytesbury Act 1815 (55 Geo. 3. c. lxii) and Annual Turnpike Acts Continuance Act 1869 (32 & 33 Vict. c. 90))
Croydon Parish Church Act 1760 (repealed)	1 Geo. 3. c. 38	19 March 1761
An Act for repairing the Parish Church of Croydon, in the County of Surrey. (Repealed by Statute Law (Repeals) Act 2013 (c. 2))
Stafford, Worcester and Warwick Roads Act 1760 or the Wolverhampton Turnpike Act 1760 (repealed)	1 Geo. 3. c. 39	19 March 1761
An Act for amending and widening the Road from the Town of Stone to Wordsley Green Gate, and from the West End of Bilston Street in Wolverhampton to The High Street opposite The Old Bush in Dudley, and from a Place called Burnt Tree, near Dudley, to Birmingham, and from the Market Cross in Wolverhampton to Cannock, in the Counties of Stafford, Worcester, and Warwick. (Repealed by Stone, Stafford and Penkridge Turnpike Road Act 1824 (5 Geo. 4. c. lix) and Dudley, Birmingham, Wolverhampton and Streetway District Roads Act 1829 (10 Geo. 4. c. lxxix))
Dartford and Strood Roads Act 1760 (repealed)	1 Geo. 3. c. 40	19 March 1761
An Act for rendering more effectual several Acts, passed in the Tenth Year of Her late Majesty Queen Anne, (Note: Kent Roads Act 1711 (10 Ann. c. 16)) in the Eleventh Year of His late Majesty King George the First, (Note: Kent Roads Act 1724 (11 Geo. 1. c. 5)) and in the Eleventh Year of His late Majesty King George the Second, (Note: Kent Roads Act 1737 (11 Geo. 2. c. 37)) for enlarging, amending, and maintaining, the Road from Dartford to Northfleet and Gravesend, and from Gravesend to Chalk, and from Northfleet to Chalk, and from thence to The Stones End near the Parish Church of Strood, in the County of Kent. (Repealed by Road from Dartford to Strood Act 1822 (3 Geo. 4. c. lxx))
Yorkshire and Durham Roads Act 1760 (repealed)	1 Geo. 3. c. 41	19 March 1761
An Act for amending and widening the Roads from the Turnpike Road upon Gatherley Moor in the County of York, to Staindrop in the County of Durham; and from the said Turnpike Road near Smallways, across the River Tees, to Winston in the said County of Durham; and for building a Bridge over the said River, at or near Winston Ford. (Repealed by Gatherley Moor and Staindrop, and Smallways and Winston Roads Act 1825 (6 Geo. 4. c. vii))
White Cross and Beverley Roads Act 1760 (repealed)	1 Geo. 3. c. 42	19 March 1761
An Act for repairing and amending the Road leading from Whitecross in the Parish of Leven in Holderness, in the East Riding of the County of York, to the Town of Beverley in the said County. (Repealed by Whitecross and Beverley Road Act 1826 (7 Geo. 4. c. cxxvi))
Westmorland Roads Act 1760 (repealed)	1 Geo. 3. c. 43	19 March 1761
An Act for repairing and widening the Road from the Borough of Appleby in the County of Westmorland, through the Township of Orton to Kirby Kendal; and from Orton to the Turnpike Road near Shapp; and from Highgate near Tebay, in a Part of the Highway between Appleby and Kirby Kendal, through the Town of Kirby Steven, to the Town of Market Brough in the said County. (Repealed by Appleby and Kendal and other roads in Westmorland Act 1824 (5 Geo. 4. c. xv))
Whitehaven Improvement Act 1760	1 Geo. 3. c. 44	19 March 1761
An Act for continuing so much of an Act, passed in the Thirteenth Year of King George the Second, (Note: Whitehaven Harbour Improvement Act 1739 (13 Geo. 2. c. 14)) intituled, "An Act for making more effectual Two Acts of Parliament, passed in the Seventh (Note: Whitehaven Harbour Act 1708 (7 Ann. c. 9)) and Tenth (Note: Whitehaven Harbour Act 1711 (10 Ann. c. 17)) Years of Her late Majesty Queen Anne, for preserving and enlarging the Harbour of Whitehaven in the County of Cumberland, and for repairing and amending the High Roads leading to the said Harbour and Town of Whitehaven," as relates to the preserving and enlarging of the said Harbour.

=== Private acts ===
Short title	Citation	Royal assent
Long title
Naturalization of John Dolignon, Peter Thellusson, Peter Planche and Christian Poppe.	1 Geo. 3. c. 1 Pr.	23 December 1760
An Act for naturalizing John Dolignon, Peter Thellusson, Peter Anthony Planché, and Christian Poppe.
Heath's Naturalization Act 1760	1 Geo. 3. c. 2 Pr.	23 December 1760
An Act for naturalizing Rose Marie Heath, Wife of Benjamin Heath Esquire.
Cooke's Name Act 1760	1 Geo. 3. c. 3 Pr.	20 January 1761
An Act to enable Charles Molloy, an Infant (lately called Charles Cooke), and the Heirs of his Body, to take and use the Surname and Arms of Molly, pursuant to the Will of Sir Charles Molloy Knight, deceased.
Rearsby Inclosure Act 1760	1 Geo. 3. c. 4 Pr.	3 March 1761
An Act for the dividing and enclosing the Open Arable Fields, and the Open Meadow Pasture, and Waste Grounds, in the Parish of Rearsby, in the County of Leicester.
Hinton Waldrist Inclosure Act 1760	1 Geo. 3. c. 5 Pr.	3 March 1761
An Act for dividing and enclosing the Common Fields, Common or Waste Ground, and other Commonable Places; in the Parish of Hinton, otherwise Hinton Walrish, in the County of Berks.
Asfordby Inclosure Act 1760	1 Geo. 3. c. 6 Pr.	3 March 1761
An Act for dividing and enclosing the Open and Common Fields of Asfordby, in the County of Leicester.
Snowshill Inclosure Act 1760	1 Geo. 3. c. 7 Pr.	3 March 1761
An Act for dividing and enclosing certain Common Fields, and Common Meadows, and a Common Hill, called Snowshill Hill, lying within the Manor of Snowshill, in the County of Gloucester.
Moreton Pinkney Inclosure Act 1760	1 Geo. 3. c. 8 Pr.	3 March 1761
An Act for dividing and enclosing the Open and Common Fields, Common Meadows, Common Pastures, Common Grounds, and Commonable Lands, within the Parish, Township, and Liberties, of Morton Pinkney, in the County of Northampton.
Langton Herring Inclosure Act 1760	1 Geo. 3. c. 9 Pr.	3 March 1761
An Act for dividing and enclosing the Common Fields, Commons, and Waste Grounds, lying in the Parish and within the Precincts of the Manor of Langton Herring, in the County of Dorset.
Eydon Inclosure Act 1760	1 Geo. 3. c. 10 Pr.	3 March 1761
An Act for dividing and enclosing the Common Fields, Common Pastures, Common Meadows, Common Grounds, Grange Lands, and Waste Grounds, of and in the Manor and Parish of Eydon, in the County of Northampton.
Pailton Inclosure Act 1760	1 Geo. 3. c. 11 Pr.	3 March 1761
An Act for the dividing and enclosing the Open and Common Fields in the Hamlet of Pailton, in the Parish of Monks Kirby, in the County of Warwick.
Earl of Dartmouth's Estate Act 1760	1 Geo. 3. c. 12 Pr.	3 March 1761
An Act for vesting Part of the settled Estates of the Right Honourable William Earl of Dartmouth and Frances Katherine Countess of Dartmouth his Wife, in the City of London and County of Middlesex, in Trustees, to be sold; and for laying out the Money to arise thereby in the Purchase of other Lands and Hereditaments, to be settled to the same Uses as the said settled Estates now stand limited.
Thornton's Estate Act 1760	1 Geo. 3. c. 13 Pr.	3 March 1761
An Act for vesting Part of the settled Estate of William Thornton Esquire, in the County of York, in him, in Fee-simple, discharged of the Uses of his Marriage Settlement; and for settling other Lands, of greater Value, to the same Uses.
Enabling Capel and George Hanbury to exchange their settled estates in Monmouthshire for themselves and their issue male.	1 Geo. 3. c. 14 Pr.	3 March 1761
An Act to enable Capel Hanbury Esquire and George Hanbury Esquire, for themselves and their respective Issue Male, to make an Exchange of their settled Estates in the County of Monmouth; and for other Purposes therein mentioned.
Rendering effectual an agreement for making a partition of James Sherard's and Robert Freeman's estates in Leicestershire.	1 Geo. 3. c. 15 Pr.	3 March 1761
An Act for rendering effectual an Agreement, for making a Partition of several Lands, Tenements, and Hereditaments, in the County of Leicester, late the Estates of James Sherard Doctor of Physick, and Robert Freeman Gentleman, deceased; and for other Purposes therein mentioned.
Lemon's Estate Act 1760	1 Geo. 3. c. 16 Pr.	3 March 1761
An Act for enabling the acting Trustees and Executors of William Lemon Esquire, deceased, to make Leases for Lives, or Years determinable on Deaths, of the Estates in the County of Cornwall, devised by his Will, or purchased in Pursuance thereof, respectively, during the Minority of his Grandsons and Nephews entitled to the same for the Time being; and for enabling the said Grandsons and Nephews when of Age, and the said Trustees during their Infancy, respectively, to make and grant Setts and Leases of Mines, according to the Custom of the Country.
Confirming and establishing an agreement concerning Charles Tudway and Archdeacon of Wells' estates exchange.	1 Geo. 3. c. 17 Pr.	3 March 1761
An Act for confirming and establishing an exchange of Lands, agreed to be made, between Charles Tudway Esquire and the Archdeacon of Wells, in the County of Somerset.
St. Mary Newington Butts Glebe lands: enabling rector and successors to grant leases.	1 Geo. 3. c. 18 Pr.	3 March 1761
An Act to enable the Rector of the Parish and Parish Church of Saint Mary Newington Butts, in the County of Surrey, and his Successors, to grant a Lease or Leases of certain Glebe Lands belonging to the said Rectory.
Naturalization of Frederick Rasch and John Seibel.	1 Geo. 3. c. 19 Pr.	3 March 1761
An Act for naturalizing Frederick Rasch and John Roger Siebel.
Naturalization of Jan Turner and August Pieschel.	1 Geo. 3. c. 20 Pr.	3 March 1761
An Act for naturalizing Jan Turner and August Gottlieh Pieschel.
Hampden's Naturalization Act 1760	1 Geo. 3. c. 21 Pr.	3 March 1761
An Act for naturalizing Constantia Hampden Wife of Robert Hampden Esquire.
Maisonneuve's Naturalization Act 1760	1 Geo. 3. c. 22 Pr.	3 March 1761
An Act for naturalizing Benjamin Maisonneuve.
Theaud's Naturalization Act 1760	1 Geo. 3. c. 23 Pr.	3 March 1761
An Act for naturalizing Nicholas Theaud.
Baratty's Naturalization Act 1760	1 Geo. 3. c. 24 Pr.	3 March 1761
An Act for naturalizing Simon Baratty.
Villion's Naturalization Act 1760	1 Geo. 3. c. 25 Pr.	3 March 1761
An Act for naturalizing Anthony Villion.
Wappenham Inclosure Act 1760	1 Geo. 3. c. 26 Pr.	19 March 1761
An Act for dividing and enclosing the Common Fields, Common Pastures, Common Meadows, Common Grounds, Waste Grounds, and Commonable Lands, in the Manor and Parish of Wappenham, in the County of Northampton, exclusive of the Hamlet of Astwell and Faulcut in the said Parish.
Exhall Inclosure Act 1760	1 Geo. 3. c. 27 Pr.	19 March 1761
An Act for dividing and enclosing the Open and Common Fields, Pastures, Meadows, and other Grounds, within the Parish of Exhall, in the County of the City of Coventry.
Ryton-on-Dunsmore Inclosure Act 1760	1 Geo. 3. c. 28 Pr.	19 March 1761
An Act for dividing and enclosing the Common Fields, Common Pastures, Waste Grounds, and Commonable Lands, in the Parish of Ryton, otherwise Ruyton upon Dunsmore, in the County of Warwick.
Moresby Inclosure Act 1760	1 Geo. 3. c. 29 Pr.	19 March 1761
An Act for dividing and enclosing an Open Common, within the Manor and Parish of Morresby, in the County of Cumberland.
Williamscote or Willscot, and Coton or Cotes (Oxfordshire) inclosures.	1 Geo. 3. c. 30 Pr.	19 March 1761
An Act for dividing and enclosing the Open and Common Fields, Common Meadows, Common Grounds, and Waste Ground, within Wardington, Williamscott otherwise Willscott, and Coton otherwise Cotes, in the County of Oxford.
Confirming and establishing an agreement concerning East Lulworth and Combe Keynes (Dorset) inclosure.	1 Geo. 3. c. 31 Pr.	19 March 1761
An Act for confirming and establishing Articles of Agreement, for dividing and enclosing several Commons, Common Heaths, and Waste Grounds, in the adjoining Manors of East Lulworth and Combe Keynes, in the County of Dorset.
Norham Inclosure Act 1760	1 Geo. 3. c. 32 Pr.	19 March 1761
An Act for dividing and enclosing certain Open and Common Grounds called Norham Infields, and the Common or Waste called Norham Moor, within the Township of Norham, in the County of Durham.
Ansty Inclosure Act 1760	1 Geo. 3. c. 33 Pr.	19 March 1761
An Act for dividing and enclosing the Common and Open Fields of Ansty, in the County of Leicester.
Abkettleby Inclosure Act 1760	1 Geo. 3. c. 34 Pr.	19 March 1761
An Act for dividing and enclosing the Open and Common Fields of Abkettleby, in the County of Leicester, and all the Lands and Grounds within the same Fields.
Fringford or Ferringford (Oxfordshire) Inclosure Act 1760	1 Geo. 3. c. 35 Pr.	19 March 1761
An Act for dividing and enclosing certain Open and Common Fields in the Parish of Fringford, otherwise Ferringford, in the County of Oxford.
Lanverchildol and Street Marshall (Montgomery) Inclosure Act 1760	1 Geo. 3. c. 36 Pr.	19 March 1761
An Act for dividing, enclosing, and allotting, the Moors, Commons, and Waste Grounds, called Pool Common, in the Manors of Lanverchidol and Stret Marcel, otherwise Stret Marshall, in the Parishes of Pool and Guilsfield, in the County of Montgomery.
Burton Pidsea Inclosure Act 1760	1 Geo. 3. c. 37 Pr.	19 March 1761
An Act for confirming and establishing Articles of Agreement, for dividing and enclosing certain Open and Common Fields in Burton Pidsea in Holderness, in the County of York.
Heslington Inclosure Act 1760	1 Geo. 3. c. 38 Pr.	19 March 1761
An Act for confirming Articles of Agreement, for enclosing Common or Waste Ground within the Manor or Lordship of Heslington, in the County of York.
John Earl of Sandwich, Wellbore Ellis, Robert Nugent, William Earl of Harrington and Richard Rigby oaths of office.	1 Geo. 3. c. 39 Pr.	19 March 1761
An Act to enable John Earl of Sandwich, Welbore Ellis Esquire, and Robert Nugent Esquire, to take in Great Britain the Oath of Office, as Vice Treasurer and Receiver General and Paymaster General of all His Majesty's Revenues in the Kingdom of Ireland; and to enable William Earl of Harrington to take in Great Britain the Oath of Office, as Customer and Collector of the Ports of Dublin, Skerrys, Malahide, and Wicklow, in the said Kingdom; and to enable Richard Rigby Esquire to take in Great Britain the Oath of Office, as Keeper and Master of the Rolls of the Court of Chancery in the said Kingdom, and Clerk, Keeper, or Master, of the Rolls, Books, Writs, and Records, of the said Court; and to qualify themselves for the Enjoyment of the said respective Offices.
Viscount Bolingbroke's Estate Act 1760	1 Geo. 3. c. 40 Pr.	19 March 1761
An Act for vesting Part of the settled Estate of Frederick Viscount Bolingbroke, in the County of Kent, in Trustees, to be sold; and for settling an Estate in the County of Surrey, of greater Value, in Lieu thereof; and for empowering him to sell other Part of the said Kentish Estate, for the Purposes therein mentioned.
Bartholomew Clarke and Hitch Younge estates: sale of lands and hereditaments in London, Middlesex, Surrey, Berkshire and Northamptonshire and purchase and settling of others to uses of their wills.	1 Geo. 3. c. 41 Pr.	19 March 1761
An Act for selling divers Lands and Hereditaments, in London, Middlesex, Berkshire, and Northamptonshire, devised by the Wills of Bartholomew Clarke and Hitch Younge Esquires; and for laying out the Money arising by such Sale in the Purchase of other Lands and Hereditaments, to be settled, in Lieu thereof, to the Uses of the said Wills, respectively.
Walter's Estate Act 1760	1 Geo. 3. c. 42 Pr.	19 March 1761
An Act for vesting the Plantation and Estate of John Walter Esquire and Newton his Wife (late Newton Walker, Spinster), in the Island of Barbadoes, in Trustees, for raising Money, to be applied in purchasing of Stock; and for other Purposes, for the Improvement of the same Plantation and Estate.
Dodwell's Estate Act 1760	1 Geo. 3. c. 43 Pr.	19 March 1761
An Act for selling divers Lands and Hereditaments, in the City of London, and in the Counties of Middlesex, Kent, Buckingham, and Somerset, devised by the Will of Sir William Dodwell Knight, deceased, and purchased in Pursuance thereof, respectively; and for laying out the Money arising by such Sale in the purchasing other Lands and Hereditaments, in or near the County of Gloucester, to be settled, in Lieu thereof, to the Uses of the said Will.
Williams' Estate Act 1760	1 Geo. 3. c. 44 Pr.	19 March 1761
An Act for vesting the settled Estate of John Williams Esquire, in the County of Essex, in Trustees, to be sold, for raising Money to discharge Encumbrances; and laying out the Surplus in the Purchase of Lands and Hereditaments, to be settled to the Uses limited of the said settled Estate.
Willis' Estate Act 1760	1 Geo. 3. c. 45 Pr.	19 March 1761
An Act for selling a Messuage and Lands in Whaddon, in the County of Bucks, settled by the late Brown Willis Esquire on the Marriage of his Son; and for purchasing another Estate, in Lieu thereof, to be settled to the same Uses.
Morse's Estate Act 1760	1 Geo. 3. c. 46 Pr.	19 March 1761
An Act for vesting and settling the Real and Personal Estate of John Morse, late Citizen and Goldsmith of London, deceased, for the Benefit of the several Persons entitled under his Will; and for the better answering and effecting the Intents and Purposes of the same Will.
Dillon's Estate Act 1760	1 Geo. 3. c. 47 Pr.	19 March 1761
An Act for divesting out of the Crown the Remainder in Fee of several Lands in Ireland, late the Estate of Martin Dillon Esquire; and for vesting the same in Carleton Whitelocke of the City of Dublin Esquire, and his Heirs, in Trust for Henry Mitchell of the said City of Dublin Esquire, his Heirs and Assigns.

=== Sources ===
- Pickering, Danby, ed. (1766). The Statutes at Large. Vol. 23: From the Thirty Second Year of King George II to the First Year of King George III Inclusive. Cambridge: Joseph Bentham. pp. 109–309 – via Internet Archive.
- Pickering, Danby, ed. (1766). The Statutes at Large. Vol. 23: From the Thirty Second Year of King George II to the First Year of King George III Inclusive. Cambridge: Joseph Bentham. pp. 109–309 – via Google Books.
- Journals of the House of Commons. Vol. 28. London: His Majesty's Stationery Office. 1803. pp. 933–1111 – via Google Books.
- Chronological Table of and Index to the Statutes. Vol. 1: To the End of the Session 59 Vict. Sess. 2 (1895) (13th ed.). London: Her Majesty's Stationery Office. 1896. p. 120 – via Google Books.

== See also ==
- List of acts of the Parliament of Great Britain
