= Succession to the Crown Act =

The Succession to the Crown Act, or Act of Succession, may refer to a number of pieces of English law passed in the reign of Henry VIII:

- The Succession to the Crown Act 1533 (25 Hen. 8. c. 22)
- The Succession to the Crown Act 1534 (26 Hen. 8. c. 2)
- The Succession to the Crown Act 1536 (28 Hen. 8. c. 7)
- The Succession to the Crown Act 1543 (35 Hen. 8. c. 1) (often incorrectly given as 1544)

It may also refer to the first statute in the reign of James I:

- The Succession to the Crown Act 1603 (1 Jas. 1. c. 1)

It may also refer to an Act of the Parliament of Great Britain passed during the reign of Queen Anne:

- The Succession to the Crown Act 1707 (6 Ann. c. 41)

It may also refer to an Act of the Parliament of the United Kingdom of Great Britain and Northern Ireland during the reign of Queen Elizabeth II:

- The Succession to the Crown Act 2013 (c. 20)

It may also refer to an Act of the Parliament of Australia during the reign of Queen Elizabeth II

- The Succession to the Crown Act 2015
