= Thomas Cromwell =

English statesman (1485–1540)

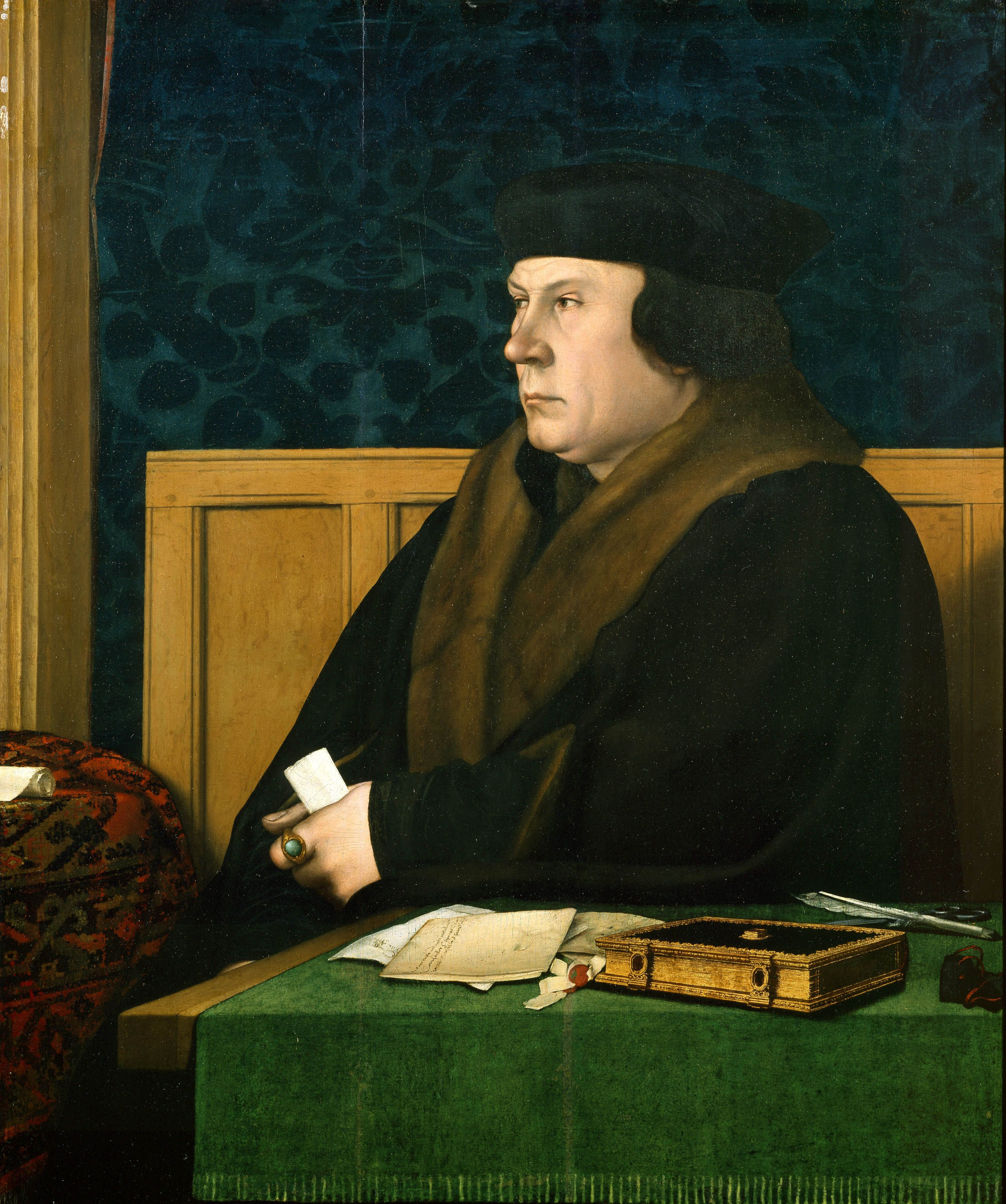
- Portrait of Thomas Cromwell (1532–1533)

Lord Great Chamberlain
- In office 17 April 1540 – 10 June 1540
- Monarch: Henry VIII
- Preceded by: John de Vere
- Succeeded by: Robert Radcliffe

Governor of the Isle of Wight
- In office 2 November 1538 – 10 June 1540
- Monarch: Henry VIII
- Preceded by: James Worsley
- Succeeded by: Richard Worsley

Lord Privy Seal
- In office 2 July 1536 – 10 June 1540
- Monarch: Henry VIII
- Preceded by: Thomas Boleyn
- Succeeded by: William Fitzwilliam

Master of the Rolls
- In office 8 October 1534 – 10 July 1536
- Monarch: Henry VIII
- Preceded by: John Taylor
- Succeeded by: Christopher Hales

Principal Secretary
- In office April 1534 – April 1540
- Monarch: Henry VIII
- Preceded by: Stephen Gardiner
- Succeeded by: Thomas Wriothesley

Chancellor of the Exchequer
- In office 12 April 1533 – 10 June 1540
- Monarch: Henry VIII
- Preceded by: John Bourchier
- Succeeded by: John Baker

Personal details
- Born: c. 1485 Putney, Surrey, England
- Died: 28 July 1540 (aged 54–55) Tower Hill, London, England
- Cause of death: Execution by beheading
- Resting place: Chapel Royal of St. Peter ad Vincula, Tower of London, London, United Kingdom; 51.508611°N 0.076944°W
- Spouse: Elizabeth Wyckes (m. 1515; died 1529)
- Children: Gregory Cromwell, 1st Baron Cromwell; Anne Cromwell; Grace Cromwell
- Relatives: Cromwell family

Thomas Cromwell, 1st Earl of Essex (/ˈkrɒmwəl, -wɛl/; (Note: Contemporary native speakers of English most often wrote the surname as Crumwell, suggesting that this spelling was an attempt to represent a commonly used pronunciation. Based on the phonetic challenges to native speakers posed by this and other variants of the frequent Cromwell spelling (e.g. Cromuello) adopted by correspondents, Diarmaid MacCulloch proposes common usage of pronunciations missing the w and shifting to "a short 'o' sound", as reflected in spellings such as Crummle or Cromell (that used by the King when he stripped Cromwell of all his titles).) c. 1485 – 28 July 1540) was an English statesman and lawyer who served as chief minister to King Henry VIII from 1534 until mid-1540, at which time he was beheaded on Henry's orders, a loss the King would later regret.

Cromwell was one of the most powerful proponents of the English Reformation. As the King's chief secretary, he instituted new administrative procedures that transformed the workings of government. He helped to engineer an annulment of the King's marriage to Catherine of Aragon so that Henry could lawfully marry Anne Boleyn. Henry had failed to obtain the approval of Pope Clement VII for the annulment in 1533, so Parliament endorsed the King's claim to be Supreme Head of the Church of England — thus giving him the authority to annul his own marriage. Cromwell subsequently charted an evangelical and reformist course for the new Church of England from his unique posts of Vicegerent in Spirituals and Vicar General (the two titles refer to the same position).

During his rise to power, Cromwell made many enemies, including Henry's second queen Anne Boleyn, due to his reformist policies and non-noble background. He played a prominent role in her downfall and execution on charges of treason in 1536. He fell from power in 1540, despite being created Earl of Essex that year, after arranging the King's short-lived fourth marriage to the German princess Anne of Cleves. The marriage was a disaster for Cromwell, ending in an annulment six months later. Cromwell was arraigned under an act of attainder (32 Hen. 8. c. 62) and was executed for treason and heresy on Tower Hill on 28 July 1540. The King later expressed regret at the loss of his chief minister, and his reign never recovered from the incident.

== Family background and early life ==
=== Putney ===
Thomas Cromwell is thought to have been born by or around 1485 in Putney, (Note: In 1878, his presumed birthplace was still of note: The site of Cromwell's birthplace is still pointed out by tradition and is in some measure confirmed by the survey of Wimbledon Manor ... for it describes on that spot 'an ancient cottage called the smith's shop, lying west of the highway from Richmond to Wandsworth, being the sign of the Anchor'. The Anchor, the family hostelry, was situated in modern-day Brewhouse Lane, near to the Thames in Putney. Another tradition places the cottage higher on Putney Hill, at the edge of Putney Heath.) then a village in Surrey providing a ferry service across the Thames upstream from London. His grandfather, John, had moved to the area from Nottinghamshire (Note: A well-informed but anonymous contemporary chronicler wrote that the Cromwell family was of Irish ancestry, but the nineteenth-century scholar James Gairdner traced the family roots to Norwell in Nottinghamshire.) to run a fulling mill (for wool processing) leased to him by the Archbishop of Canterbury, who had a mansion farther upstream at Mortlake and was lord of the local manor of Wimbledon. His father, Walter (c. 1450 – c. 1514), was an ambitious yeoman landowner who plied various trades, operating as a sheep farmer and wool processor ("fuller" and "shearman"), while also running a tavern and a brewery. A popular tradition that he was also a blacksmith is plausible, although the association could have arisen from his use of the alternative surname of Smith (as in "Cromwell alias Smyth"). As a successful tradesman, Cromwell's father was regularly called upon for jury service and was elected Constable of Putney in 1495. He had frequent brushes with the law himself in the local manorial court, often on relatively minor matters, (Note: MacCulloch largely dismisses as "Victorian fantasy" popular accounts that Walter was a violent man, unscrupulous in his business dealings, contending that such notions are based on a mistaken understanding of Putney manorial court records, where civil disagreements are not easily distinguished from criminal proceedings, or fines for breaching ale quality standards from "a routine manorial system of licensing ale-selling".) but also for assault and, ultimately, in 1514, for "falsely and fraudulently" removing evidence from the court roll regarding his manorial tenancy, a judgement that led to confiscation of all his accumulated lands.

Little is known about Cromwell's mother, even though she came from a recognised gentry family, the Meverells of Staffordshire. Generally referred to as "Katherine Meverell", her first name is uncertain. She married Cromwell's father in 1474 while living in Putney in the house of a local attorney, John Welbeck.

Cromwell is assumed to have been the youngest of three children. (Note: In the single surviving mention of his mother, Cromwell made the improbable assertion that she was 52 years old at the time of his birth.) He had two sisters: the elder, Katherine, married Morgan Williams, a Welsh lawyer's son who came to Putney as a follower of King Henry VII when he established himself in the nearby Richmond Palace; the younger, Elizabeth, married William Wellyfed, a sheep farmer. Katherine and Morgan's son, Richard, was employed in his uncle's service and by the autumn of 1529 had changed his name to Cromwell. Richard was the great-grandfather of Oliver Cromwell.

No record survives of Cromwell's childhood days in Putney, and it is unknown whether he was ever sent to school or had to serve an apprenticeship. Various people from Putney crop up in his adult life, and he maintained close relations with his two sisters and their extended families.

=== Early life ===
==== France, Italy and the Low Countries ====
Cromwell acknowledged to Thomas Cranmer, the Archbishop of Canterbury, that he had been a "ruffian ... in his young days". Around the start of the 16th century, for reasons which remain unclear, he left his family in Putney and crossed the Channel to continental Europe, allegedly (Note: The claim that he spent time in prison was made by Eustace Chapuys.) after spending some time in prison. Accounts of his activities in France, Italy and the Low Countries are problematic. The tradition that he quickly became a mercenary and marched with the French army to Italy, where in 1503 he fought in the Battle of Garigliano, stems from a novella by the contemporary Italian writer Matteo Bandello in which Cromwell is portrayed as a page to a foot-soldier, carrying his pike and helmet. This account was treated as fact by many later writers, including John Foxe in his Actes and Monuments of 1563. Despite the obvious exaggerations contained in Bandello's novella, MacCulloch points out that the "picaresque" narrative provides the best available clues to shine some light on the obscurity of Cromwell's first Italian trip.

While in Italy, Cromwell seems to have entered service in the household of the Frescobaldi family of Florentine bankers (Bandello has an implausibly young Francesco Frescobaldi graciously saving him from starvation on the streets of Florence). It appears that he later worked as a cloth merchant in the Low Countries, where his frequentation of English Merchant Adventurers allowed him to develop useful contacts and gain familiarity with several languages. Cromwell, who was known to have a prodigious memory, was probably already fluent in French and Italian, as well as being proficient in Latin, with some knowledge also of Ancient Greek.

==== Return to Italy ====
At some point Cromwell returned to Italy: the records of the English Hospital in Rome indicate that he stayed there in June 1514, while documents in the Vatican Archives suggest that he was an agent for the Archbishop of York, Cardinal Christopher Bainbridge, and handled English ecclesiastical issues before the Roman Rota.

In 1517–1518, he travelled to Rome again, this time to gain Pope Leo X's continued approval for plenary indulgences being sold by the St Mary's Guild, Boston—a lucrative trade. During this lengthy trip, Cromwell studied in detail Erasmus's new edition of the gospels. His reading made him, for the first time, doubt the legitimacy of the practice he was hired to advocate. Tracy Borman has suggested that it was at this point Cromwell developed his contempt for the papacy, because of the ease with which he had been able to manipulate the Pope into granting the Boston petition without due consideration.

== Marriage and issue ==
At one point during these years, Cromwell returned to England, where around 1515 he married Elizabeth Wyckes (d. 1529). She was the widow of Thomas Williams, a Yeoman of the Guard, and the daughter of a Putney shearman, Henry Wyckes, who had later served as a Gentleman Usher to King Henry VII. The couple had three children:

- Gregory Cromwell, 1st Baron Cromwell (c. 1520–1551), who became Elizabeth Seymour's second husband.
- Anne Cromwell (c. 1522 – October 1529)
- Grace Cromwell (c. 1527 – October 1529)

Cromwell's wife died in 1529 and his daughters, Anne and Grace, are believed to have died not long after their mother. Their deaths may have been caused by the sweating sickness. Provisions made for Anne and Grace in Cromwell's will, dated 12 July 1529, were crossed out at some later date. Gregory outlived his father by only 11 years, succumbing to sweating sickness in 1551.

Cromwell also had an illegitimate daughter, Jane (c. 1530–1580), whose early life is a complete mystery. Jane was born to an unknown mother during the time Cromwell was mourning the loss of his wife and daughters. Jane presumably was educated and resided in Cromwell's homes, but in 1539, Margaret Vernon, the worldly prioress of Little Marlow Priory (who had also helped to raise Gregory Cromwell) suggested she take Jane to begin her education away from home. In that same year Jane's half-brother Gregory (at age nineteen) and his wife Elizabeth moved into Leeds Castle, Kent, in preparation for Gregory's election as a knight of the shire (Member of Parliament) for the county. Jane, then nine years of age, accompanied him. Cromwell's records show him paying Elizabeth for clothing and expenses for Jane. It is unknown what became of Jane's mother, though historian Caroline Angus argues that Jane's mother was Elizabeth Gregory, a former household servant who was left a surprisingly large amount of money and items in Cromwell's will. Elizabeth Gregory was listed among family members in the will, despite not being any relation to the Cromwell, Williams, Wyckes or Williamson families. Cromwell was known to be one of the few men at court without mistresses and tried to keep this indiscretion secret.

Jane married William Hough (c. 1527–1585), of Leighton in the Wirral Hundred, around 1550. William Hough was the son of Richard Hough (1505–1574) who was Cromwell's agent in Chester from 1534 to 1540. Jane and her husband remained staunch Catholics, who, together with their daughter, Alice, her husband, William Whitmore, and their children, all came to the attention of the authorities as recusants during the reign of Elizabeth I.

== Lawyer, Member of Parliament, adviser to Wolsey ==
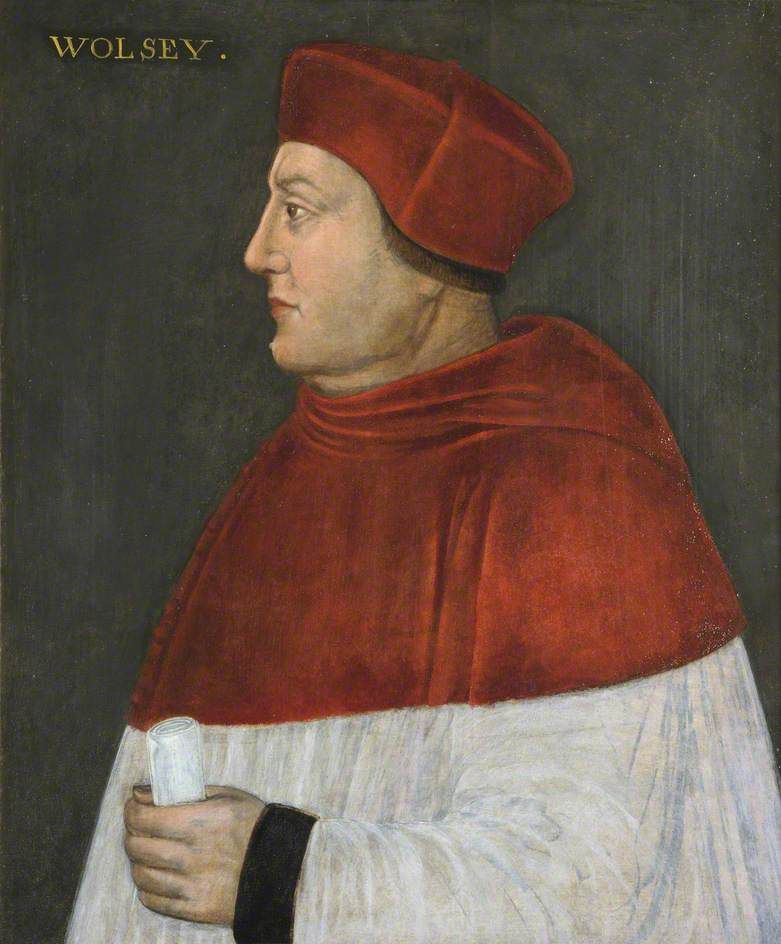
Cardinal Thomas Wolsey

By 1520, Cromwell was firmly established in London mercantile and legal circles. In 1523, he obtained a seat in the House of Commons as a burgess, though the constituency he represented has not been identified with certainty. He prepared a daring speech against King Henry's declared intention of leading an invasion of France, although it was expressed tactfully in terms of concern for the King's safety while on campaign and fear of the costs such an overbold policy would entail; it was the latter point that embodied Cromwell's true concern. There is no record of when Cromwell actually delivered the speech in the chamber and some modern historians, including Michael Everett and Robert Woods, have suggested that the whole episode was no more than a ploy, sanctioned by Henry himself, to allow him to withdraw graciously from his rash threat of war.

After Parliament had been dissolved, Cromwell wrote a letter to a friend, jesting about the session's lack of productivity:

I amongst other have indured a parlyament which contenwid by the space of xvii hole wekes wher we communyd of warre pease Stryffe contencyon debatte murmure grudge Riches poverte penurye trowth falshode Justyce equyte dicayte [deceit] opprescyon Magnanymyte actyvyte foce [force] attempraunce [moderation] Treason murder Felonye consyli... [conciliation] and also how a commune welth myght be ediffyed and a[lso] contenewid within our Realme. Howbeyt in conclusyon we have d[one] as our predecessors have been wont to doo that ys to say, as well we myght and lefte wher we begann.

For a short while early in 1523 Cromwell became an adviser to Thomas Grey, 2nd Marquess of Dorset, drafting a parliamentary bill to relieve his sponsor of taxation on some property in Cumberland. Although the bill was not introduced in the 1523 session of Parliament, this may indicate that the unidentified seat for which Cromwell was returned in that year was Carlisle, Cumberland, to present the Marquess's bill. Early in 1524 he became a member of the household of Lord Chancellor Cardinal Thomas Wolsey although, initially, he maintained his private legal practice; in that year he was elected a member of Gray's Inn, a lawyers' guild. Cromwell assisted in the dissolution of nearly thirty monasteries to raise funds for Wolsey to found The King's School, Ipswich (1528), and Cardinal College, in Oxford (1529). In 1527 Wolsey appointed Cromwell a member of his personal council, as one of his most senior and trusted advisers. By the end of October of that year, however, Wolsey had fallen from power. Cromwell had made enemies by aiding Wolsey to suppress the monasteries, but was determined not to fall with his master, as he told George Cavendish, then a Gentleman Usher and later Wolsey's biographer:

I do entend (god wyllyng) this after none, whan my lord hathe dyned to ride to london and so to the Court, where I wyll other make or marre, or ere [before] I come agayn, I wyll put my self in the prese [press] to se what any man is Able to lay to my charge of ontrouthe or mysdemeanor.

Cavendish acknowledges that Cromwell's moves to mend the situation were by means of engaging himself in an energetic defence of Wolsey ("There could nothing be spoken against my lord ... but he [Cromwell] would answer it incontinent[ly]") rather than by distancing himself from his old master's actions, and this display of "authentic loyalty" only enhanced his reputation, not least in the mind of the King.

== Royal favourite ==
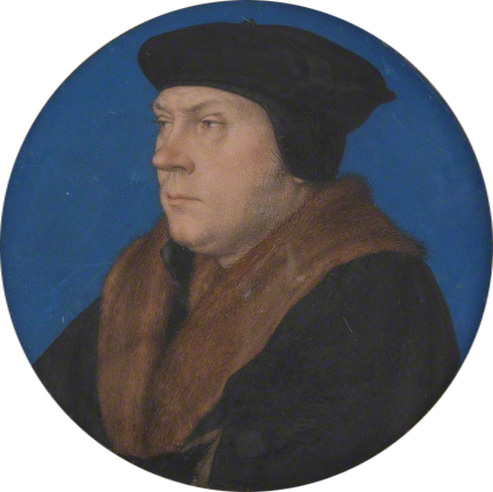
Thomas Cromwell, c. 1532–1533, attributed to Hans Holbein the Younger

Cromwell successfully overcame the shadow cast over his career by Wolsey's downfall. By November 1529, he had secured a seat in Parliament as a member for Taunton and was reported to be in favour with the King. Early in this short session of Parliament (November to December 1529) Cromwell involved himself with legislation to restrict absentee clergy from collecting stipends from multiple parishes ("clerical farming") and to abolish the power of Rome to award dispensations for the practice.

At some point during the closing weeks of 1530, the King appointed him to the Privy Council. Cromwell held numerous offices during his career in the King's service, including:

- Commissioner for the Subsidy, London 1524, Kent 1534, for printing of the Bible 1539, for sale of crown lands 1539, 1540
- Master of the King's Jewel House, jointly with Sir John Williams 14 April 1532, c. 1533–1540
- Clerk of the Hanaper 16 July 1532, jointly with Ralph Sadler April 1535 – 1540
- Chancellor of the Exchequer, 12 April 1533 – 1540
- Recorder, Bristol, 1533–1540
- Steward, Westminster Abbey, 12 September 1533, jointly with Robert Wroth 14 February 1534 – May 1535
- Lordships of Edmonton and Sayesbery, Middlesex, May 1535; of manor of Writtle, Essex, June 1536; of Havering-atte-Bower, Essex, December 1537
- Steward of the Honour of Rayleigh, Essex, September 1539
- Surveyor of the King's Woods, jointly with Sir William Paulet by 1533
- Principal Secretary, c. April 1534–April 1540
- Master of the Rolls, 8 October 1534 – 10 July 1536
- Constable jointly with Richard Williams (alias Cromwell) of Hertford Castle, Hertfordshire, 1534–1540, Berkeley Castle, Gloucestershire 1535–d., sole, Leeds Castle, Kent, 4 January 1539 – 1540
- Visitor-General of the Monasteries and Vicar General, 21 January 1535
- Steward, Duchy of Lancaster, Essex, Hertfordshire and Middlesex, 12 May 1535 – 1540
- Steward of Savoy Manor, May 1535 – 1540
- Chancellor, High Steward and Visitor, Cambridge University 1535–1540
- Commissioner for the Peace, Bristol, Kent, Middlesex, Surrey 1535–1540, Essex 1536–1540, Derbyshire, Westmorland 1537–1540, all counties 1538–1540
- Prebendary of Salisbury, May 1536 – 1540
- Receiver of Petitions in the Lords, parliament of 1536
- Trier, Parliament of 1539 (Note: A trier was the official first to receive and scrutinise petitions to the King.)
- Lord Privy Seal, 2 July 1536 – 1540
- Vicegerent of the King in Spirituals, 18 July 1536
- Dean of Wells, 1537–1540
- Warden and Chief Justice in Eyre, North of Trent, 30 December 1537 – 1540
- Governor of the Isle of Wight, 2 November 1538 – 1540
- Lord Great Chamberlain, 17 April 1540

Cromwell also possessed numerous other minor offices.

=== Anne Boleyn ===
From 1527, Henry VIII sought to have his marriage to Queen Catherine of Aragon annulled, so that he could lawfully marry Anne Boleyn with the hope of producing a legitimate heir who could inherit and secure the Tudor line. At the centre of the campaign to secure the annulment was the emerging (or crafted) doctrine of royal supremacy over the church. By the autumn of 1531, Cromwell had taken control of the supervision of the King's legal and parliamentary affairs, working closely with Thomas Audley, and had joined the inner circle of the council. By the following spring, he had begun to exert influence over elections to the House of Commons.

The third session of what is now known as the Reformation Parliament had been scheduled for October 1531, but was postponed until 15 January 1532 because of Henry's indecision as to the best way to proceed towards his annulment. Cromwell favoured the assertion of royal supremacy over the recalcitrant Church, and he manipulated support in the House of Commons for the measure by resurrecting anti-clerical grievances, the "supplication against the ordinaries" expressed earlier, in the session of 1529. Once he achieved his goal of managing affairs in Parliament, he never relinquished it. In March 1532, speaking without royal permission, he urged the House of Commons to draw up a list of clerical abuses in need of reform. On 18 March 1532, the Commons delivered a supplication to the King, denouncing clerical abuses and the power of the ecclesiastical courts, and describing Henry as "the only head, sovereign lord, protector and defender" of the Church. On 14 May 1532, Parliament was prorogued. Two days later, Sir Thomas More resigned as Lord Chancellor, realising that the battle to save the King's marriage to Catherine was lost. More's resignation from the Council represented a triumph for Cromwell and the pro-Reformation faction at court.

The King's gratitude to Cromwell was expressed in a grant of the lordship of the manor of Romney in the Welsh Marches (recently confiscated from the family of the executed Edward Stafford, 3rd Duke of Buckingham) and appointment to three relatively minor offices: Master of the Jewels on 14 April 1532, Clerk of the Hanaper on 16 July, and Chancellor of the Exchequer on 12 April 1533. None of these offices afforded much income, but the appointments were an indication of royal favour, and gave Cromwell a position in three major institutions of government: the royal household, the Chancery, and the Exchequer.

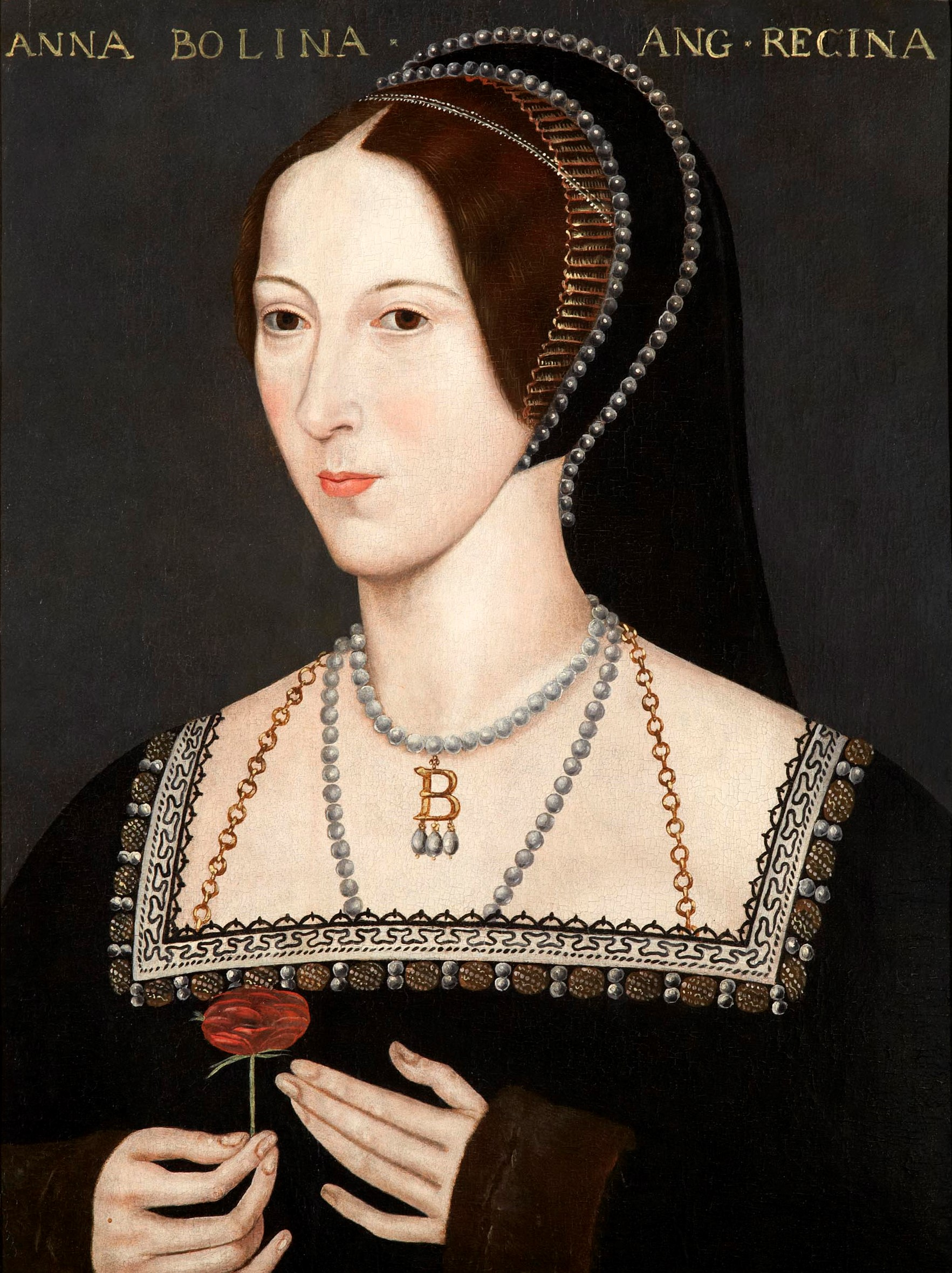
Queen Anne Boleyn

Henry and Anne married on 25 January 1533, after a secret marriage on 14 November 1532 that may have taken place in Calais.

On 26 January 1533, Audley was appointed Lord Chancellor and his replacement as Speaker of the House of Commons was Cromwell's old friend (and former lawyer to Cardinal Wolsey) Humphrey Wingfield. Cromwell further increased his control over parliament through his management of by-elections: since the previous summer, assisted by Thomas Wriothesley, then Clerk of the Signet, he had prepared a list of suitably amenable "burgesses, knights and citizens" for the vacant parliamentary seats.

The parliamentary session began on 4 February 1533, and Cromwell introduced a new bill restricting the right to make appeals to Rome, reasserting the long-standing contention that England was an "empire" and thus not subject to external jurisdiction. (Note: At this time an empire was considered to be "an extensive territory under the control of a supreme ruler", an alternative meaning to its modern usage of "an extensive group of subject territories".) On 30 March, Thomas Cranmer was consecrated as Archbishop of Canterbury and the Convocation immediately declared the King's marriage to Catherine unlawful. In the first week of April 1533, Parliament passed Cromwell's bill into law, as the Ecclesiastical Appeals Act 1532 (24 Hen. 8. c. 12), ensuring that any adjudication concerning the King's marriage could not be challenged in Rome. On 11 April, Archbishop Cranmer sent the King formal notice that the validity of his marriage to Catherine was to be the subject of an ecclesiastical court hearing. The trial began on 10 May 1533 at Dunstable Priory (near to where Catherine was staying at Ampthill Castle) and on 23 May the Archbishop pronounced the court's verdict: declaring that the marriage had been "null and invalid ... [and] contrary to the law of God". Five days later he pronounced the King's marriage to Anne to be lawful, and on 1 June, she was crowned queen.

In December, the King authorised Cromwell to discredit the papacy. The minister organised a campaign throughout the nation, attacking the Pope in sermons, pamphlets and plays mounted in parish churches. In 1534 a new Parliament was summoned, again under Cromwell's supervision, to enact the legislation necessary to formally break England's remaining ties to Rome and the Catholic hierarchy there. Archbishop Cranmer's verdict took statutory form as the Succession to the Crown Act 1533 (25 Hen. 8. c. 22), the Ecclesiastical Licences Act 1533 (25 Hen. 8. c. 21) reiterated royal supremacy, and the Submission of the Clergy Act 1533 (25 Hen. 8. c. 19) incorporated into law the clergy's surrender in 1532. On 30 March 1534, Audley gave royal assent to the legislation in the presence of the King.

== King's chief minister ==
Cromwell's coat of arms from 1532 to 1537

In April 1534, Henry confirmed Cromwell as his principal secretary and chief minister, a position which he had held for some time in all but name. Cromwell immediately took steps to enforce the legislation just passed by Parliament. Before the members of both houses returned home on 30 March, they were required to swear an oath accepting the Act of Succession: all the King's subjects were now required to swear to the legitimacy of the marriage and, by implication, to accept the King's new powers and the break from Rome. On 13 April, the London clergy accepted the oath. On the same day, the commissioners offered it to Sir Thomas More and John Fisher, Bishop of Rochester, both of whom refused it. More was taken into custody on the same day and was moved to the Tower of London on 17 April. Fisher joined him there four days later. On 7 May Cromwell led a deputation from the commissioners to Fisher and More, to persuade them to accept the Act and save themselves. This failed and, within a month, both prisoners were executed.

On 18 April, an order was issued that all citizens of London were to swear their acceptance of the Oath of Succession. Similar orders were issued throughout the country. When Parliament reconvened in November, Cromwell brought in the most significant revision of the treason laws since 1352, making it treasonous to speak rebellious words against the Royal Family, to deny their titles, or to call the King a heretic, tyrant, infidel, or usurper. The Act of Supremacy 1534 (26 Hen. 8. c. 1) also clarified the King's position as Head of the Church and the First Fruits and Tenths Act 1534 (26 Hen. 8. c. 3) substantially increased clerical taxes. Cromwell also strengthened his own control over the Church.

During November 1534, another provision of the Act of Succession was in preparation: the appointment of three vicegerentes to supervise all ecclesiastical institutions. When the measure was put into effect on 21 January 1535, however, only one name remained: that of Cromwell. (Note: The other two under consideration had been John Tregonwell and Thomas Bedyll) The King appointed him Royal Vicegerent and Vicar General, and issued a warrant to authorise a visitation of all the country's churches, monasteries and clergy. Neville Williams explains that as Vicegerent in spiritual affairs, Cromwell held sway over church doctrine and religious policy, while from the Vicar General title, he drew his authority over monasteries and other church institutions. By September 1535 Cromwell had appointed his own officials for church administration, with authority over the Archbishops of Canterbury and York, to oversee all church affairs. He never declared that this visitation was ever complete, so he retained its extensive powers in his own hands. In this capacity, Cromwell conducted a census in 1535 to enable the government to evaluate and tax church property more effectively.

A lasting achievement of Cromwell's vicegerency was his direction of Autumn 1538 that every parish in the country should securely maintain a record of all christenings, marriages and burials. Although intended as a means to identify Anabaptists (dissenting religious refugees from the Low Countries and elsewhere who did not practise infant baptism) the measure proved to be of great benefit to the posterity of English historians.

=== Fall of Anne Boleyn ===
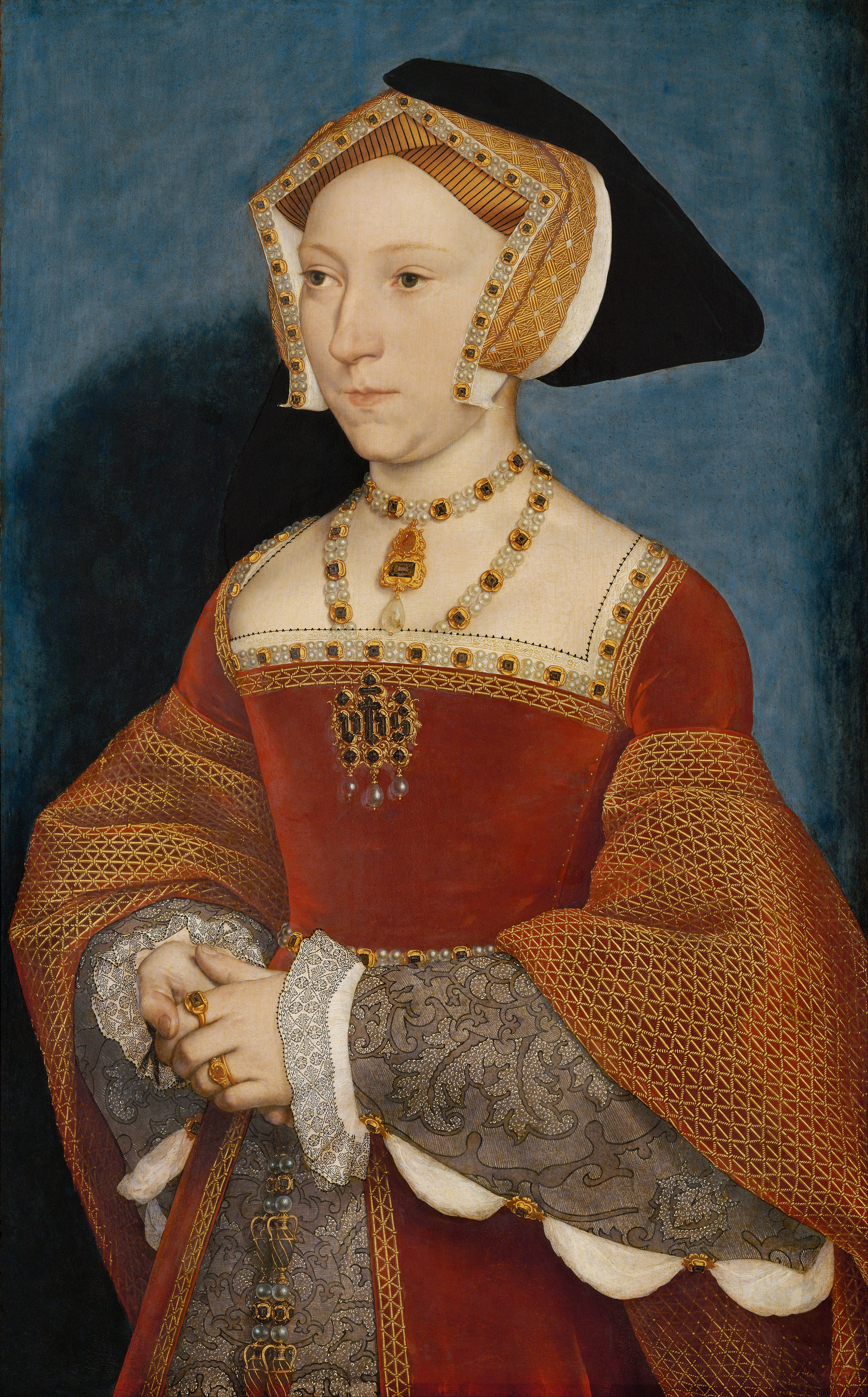
Jane Seymour by Hans Holbein the Younger

The final session of the Reformation Parliament began on 4 February 1536. By 18 March, the Suppression of Religious Houses Act 1535 (27 Hen. 8. c. 28), an act for the suppression of the Lesser Monasteries, those with a gross income of less than £200 per annum, had passed both houses. This caused a clash with Anne Boleyn, formerly one of Cromwell's strongest allies, who wanted the proceeds of the dissolution used for educational and charitable purposes, not paid into the King's coffers.

Anne instructed her chaplains to preach against the Vicegerent, and in a blistering sermon on Passion Sunday, 2 April 1536, her almoner, John Skypp, denounced Cromwell and his fellow Privy Councillors before the entire court. Skypp's diatribe was intended to persuade courtiers and Privy Councillors to change the advice they had been giving the King and to reject the temptation of personal gain. Skypp was called before the council and accused of malice, slander, presumption, lack of charity, sedition, treason, disobedience to the gospel, attacking "the great posts, pillars and columns sustaining and holding up the commonwealth" and inviting anarchy. Cromwell took no action against Skypp beyond the unsympathetic questioning, and he remained as the Queen's almoner, attending her when she was awaiting execution in the Tower of London.

Anne, who had many enemies at court, had never been popular with the people and had so far failed to produce a male heir. The King was becoming impatient, now enamoured of the young Jane Seymour and being encouraged by Anne's enemies, particularly Sir Nicholas Carew and the Seymours. In circumstances that have divided historians, Anne was accused of adultery with: Mark Smeaton, a musician of the royal household; Sir Henry Norris, the King's groom of the stool and one of his closest friends; Sir Francis Weston; Sir William Brereton; and her brother, George Boleyn, 2nd Viscount Rochford. The Imperial Ambassador, Eustace Chapuys, wrote to Charles V that:

he himself [Cromwell] has been authorised and commissioned by the King to prosecute and bring to an end the mistress's trial, to do which he had taken considerable trouble... He set himself to devise and conspire the said affair.

Regardless of the role Cromwell played in Anne Boleyn's fall, and his confessed animosity to her, Chapuys's letter states that Cromwell claimed that he was acting with the King's authority. Some historians, such as Alison Weir and Susan Bordo, are convinced that her fall and execution were engineered by Cromwell, while others, such as Diarmaid MacCulloch and John Schofield, accept that the King instigated the process. Alexander Alesius, a theologian and associate of Cromwell, wrote that it had indeed been Cromwell who hinted to Henry of Anne's infidelity, but the King had in turn instructed Cromwell to turn the rumours into proceedings.

The Queen and her brother stood trial on Monday 15 May, while the four others accused with them were condemned on the Friday beforehand. The men were executed on 17 May 1536 and, on the same day, Cranmer declared Henry's marriage to Anne invalid, a ruling that illegitimised their daughter, Princess Elizabeth. Two days later, Anne herself was executed. On 30 May, the King married Jane Seymour. On 8 June, a new Parliament passed the Second Succession Act, securing the rights of Queen Jane's heirs to the throne.

=== Baron Cromwell and Lord Privy Seal ===
Cromwell's coat of arms after his son's marriage, in 1537, to Queen Jane's sister, Elizabeth, Lady Ughtred

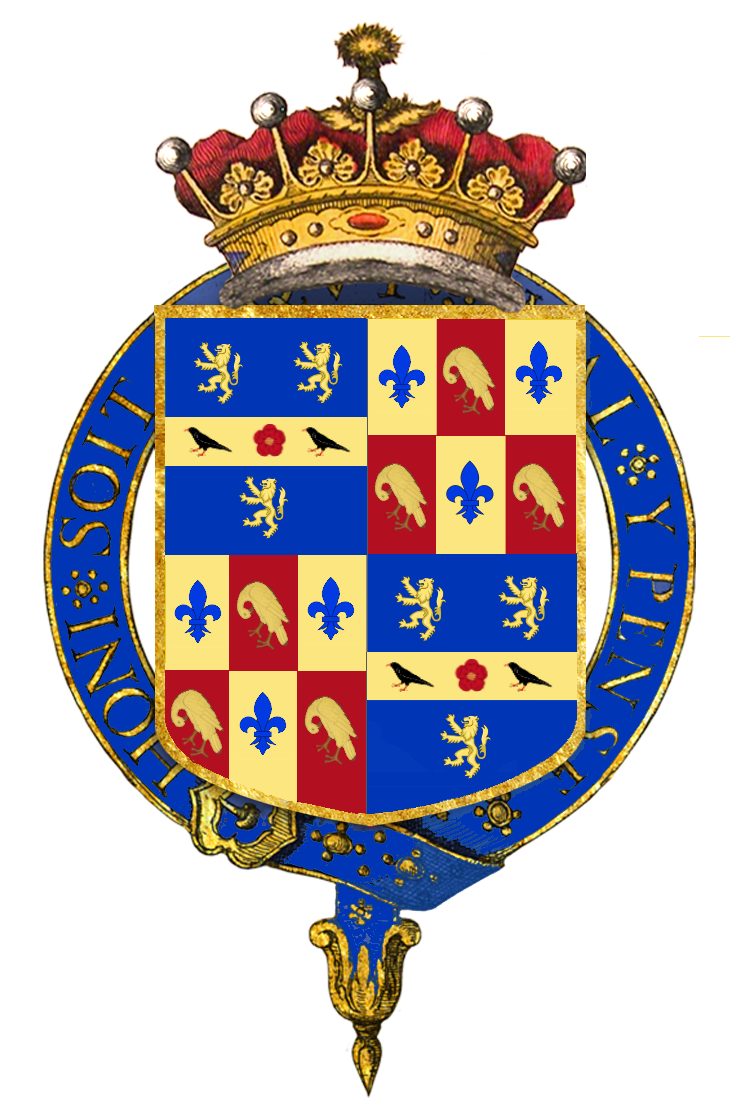
Cromwell's coat of arms as Knight of the Garter

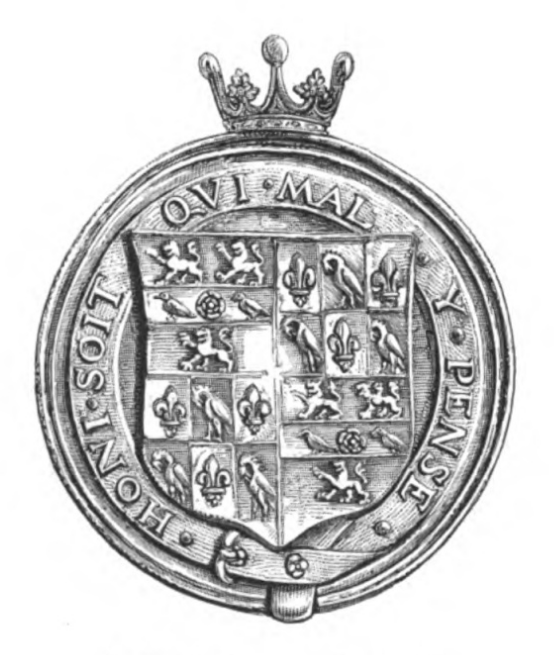
Portrait medal made for Thomas Cromwell in 1538. Reverse: armorial shield of Cromwell, being two coats quarterly within the Garter.

Cromwell's position was now stronger than ever. He succeeded Anne Boleyn's father, Thomas Boleyn, 1st Earl of Wiltshire, as Lord Privy Seal on 2 July 1536, resigning the office of Master of the Rolls, which he had held since 8 October 1534. On 8 July 1536, he was raised to the peerage as Baron Cromwell of Wimbledon.

=== Religious reform ===
Cromwell orchestrated the Dissolution of the Monasteries and visitations to the universities and colleges in 1535, which had strong links to the church. This resulted in the dispersal and destruction of many books deemed "popish" and "superstitious". This has been described as "easily the greatest single disaster in English literary history". Oxford University was left without a library collection until Sir Thomas Bodley's donation in 1602.

In July 1536, the first attempt was made to clarify religious doctrine after the break with Rome. Bishop Edward Foxe tabled proposals in Convocation, with strong backing from Cromwell and Cranmer, which the King later endorsed as the Ten Articles and which were printed in August 1536. Cromwell circulated injunctions for their enforcement that went beyond the Articles themselves, provoking opposition in September and October in Lincolnshire and then throughout the six northern counties. These widespread popular uprisings of the laity, collectively known as the Pilgrimage of Grace, found support among the gentry and even the nobility.

The rebels' grievances were wide-ranging, but the most significant was the suppression of the monasteries, blamed on the King's "evil counsellors", principally Cromwell and Cranmer. One of the arrested leaders of the rebellion was Thomas Darcy, 1st Baron Darcy of Darcy, who gave Cromwell the prophetic warning during his interrogation in the Tower: "[...] men who have been in cases like with their prince as ye be now have come at the last to the same end that ye would now bring me unto." The suppression of the risings spurred further Reformation measures. In February 1537, Cromwell convened a vicegerential synod of bishops and academics. The synod was co-ordinated by Cranmer and Foxe, and they prepared a draft document by July: The Institution of a Christian Man, more commonly known as the Bishops' Book. By October, it was in circulation, although the King had not yet given it his full assent. However, Cromwell's success in Church politics was offset by the fact that his political influence had been weakened by the emergence of a Privy Council, a body of nobles and office-holders that first came together to suppress the Pilgrimage of Grace. The King confirmed his support of Cromwell by appointing him to the Order of the Garter on 5 August 1537, but Cromwell was nonetheless forced to accept the existence of an executive body dominated by his conservative opponents.

In January 1538, Cromwell pursued an extensive campaign against what the opponents of the old religion termed "idolatry"; statues, rood screens, and images were attacked, culminating in September with the dismantling of the shrine of St. Thomas Becket at Canterbury. Early in September, Cromwell also completed a new set of vicegerential injunctions declaring open war on "pilgrimages, feigned relics or images, or any such superstitions" and commanding that "one book of the whole Bible in English" be set up in every church. Moreover, following the "voluntary" surrender of the remaining smaller monasteries during the previous year, the larger monasteries were now also "invited" to surrender throughout 1538, a process legitimised in the 1539 session of Parliament and completed in the following year.

==== Resistance to further religious reform ====
Frontispiece of the Great Bible. Henry hands Cromwell (top right) a copy of the work (Note: After Cromwell's execution his image was erased from subsequent editions and replaced with, probably, that of John Russell, 1st Earl of Bedford, a later Privy Seal.)

The King was becoming increasingly unhappy about the extent of religious changes, and the conservative faction was gaining strength at court. Cromwell took the initiative against his enemies. He imprisoned Henry Courtenay, 1st Marquess of Exeter, Sir Edward Neville, and Sir Nicholas Carew on charges of treason in November 1538 (the "Exeter Conspiracy"), using evidence acquired from Sir Geoffrey Pole under interrogation in the Tower. Sir Geoffrey, "broken in spirit", was pardoned but the others were executed.

On 17 December 1538, the Inquisitor-General of France forbade the printing of Miles Coverdale's Great Bible. Cromwell persuaded the King of France to release the unfinished books so that printing could continue in England. The first edition was finally available in April 1539. The publication of the Great Bible was one of Cromwell's principal achievements, being the first authoritative version in English. Passages from the Bible, read in English to replace the previous readings in ecclesiastical Latin, were required and Cromwell directed every parish church in England to buy a copy. The King, however, continued to resist further Reformation measures. A Parliamentary committee was established to examine doctrine, and the Duke of Norfolk presented six questions on 16 May 1539 for the House to consider, which were duly passed as the Act of Six Articles shortly before the session ended on 28 June. The Six Articles reaffirmed a traditional view of the Mass, the Sacraments, and the priesthood.

=== Anne of Cleves ===
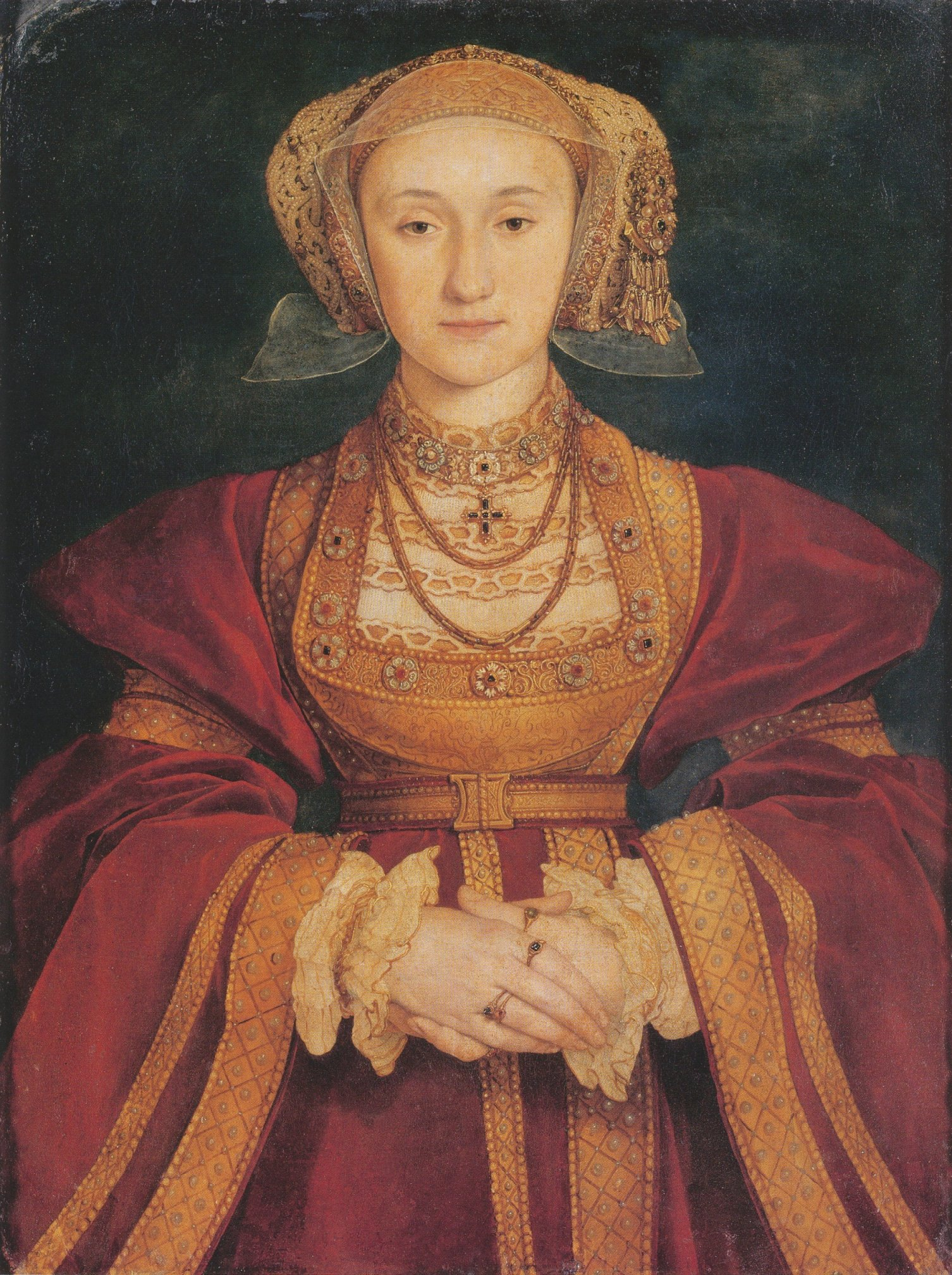
Anne of Cleves, by Hans Holbein the Younger (c. 1539)

Henry's third wife, Jane, died in 1537, less than two weeks after the birth of her only child, the future Edward VI. In early October 1539, the King finally accepted Cromwell's suggestion that he should marry Anne of Cleves, the sister of William, Duke of Jülich-Cleves-Berg, partly on the basis of a portrait which Hans Holbein had painted of her. On 27 December, Anne of Cleves arrived at Dover. On New Year's Day 1540, the King met her at Rochester, at first disguised, where he embraced and kissed Anne, though Anne "regarded him little". He later claimed to be repelled by her physically: "I like her not!" The wedding ceremony, Archbishop Cranmer officiating, took place on 6 January in the Queen's Closet at Greenwich Palace, but the marriage was not consummated. Henry said that he found it impossible to enjoy conjugal relations with a woman whom he found so unattractive.

=== Earl of Essex ===
On 18 April 1540, Henry granted Cromwell the earldom of Essex and the senior court office of Lord Great Chamberlain. Despite these signs of royal favour, Cromwell's tenure as the King's chief minister was nearing its end. The King's anger at being manoeuvered into marrying Anne of Cleves was the opportunity Cromwell's conservative opponents, most notably the Duke of Norfolk, had been hoping for.

== Downfall and execution ==
During 1536, Cromwell had proved himself an agile political survivor. The gradual movement towards Protestantism at home and the King's ill-fated marriage to Anne of Cleves, which Cromwell engineered in January 1540, proved costly. Some historians believe that Hans Holbein the Younger was partly responsible for Cromwell's downfall because he had shown the King a flattering portrait of Anne, which may have deceived him and that, when Henry finally met her, the King was reportedly shocked by her plain appearance. Cromwell had passed on to Henry some exaggerated claims of Anne's beauty. However, Nicholas Wotton, one of the envoys sent to Cleves, considered Holbein's portrait a good likeness; according to the depositions of witnesses assembled for Henry's divorce hearing, it was this first disastrous meeting with Anne that caused him to dislike his fourth wife.

Henry VIII confided in Cromwell that he had been unable to consummate the union with Anne and he allowed Cromwell to impart this information to William FitzWilliam, 1st Earl of Southampton, who, as Lord High Admiral, had conveyed Anne from Calais. Back home at Austin Friars, and uncertain how to deal with this new problem, Cromwell also told Thomas Wriothesley, his principal secretary (who also served the King in various important positions). (Note: Henry had created FitzWilliam Earl of Southampton on 18 October 1537. Wriothesley became Earl of Southampton on 16 February 1547, after FitzWilliam's death in 1542.) When Henry's humiliation became common knowledge, Southampton (who was anxious to avoid the King's displeasure for his part in bringing Anne to London), or possibly Wriothesley's close friend Edmund Bonner, Bishop of London, made sure that Cromwell was blamed for the indiscretion. Wriothesley, the Bishop, and the Lord Admiral were erstwhile friends of Cromwell and their self-serving disloyalty indicated that the minister's position was already known to be weakening.

A long-mooted Franco-Imperial alliance (contrary to England's interests) had failed to materialise. (Note: Had the proposed treaty come about the Pope would direct the reconciled rulers to mount a joint invasion of England.) The King had sent the Duke of Norfolk to the French King Francis I to offer Henry's support in his unresolved dispute with Emperor Charles V, and the mission had been received favourably. This changed the balance of power in England's favour and demonstrated that Cromwell's earlier foreign policy of wooing support from the Duchy of Cleves had unnecessarily caused his King's conjugal difficulty. Furthermore, the possibility of war was arising between the Duke of Cleves and Charles V and, if this materialised, Henry would be trapped by his new alliance with Cleves into declaring war on France, an unwelcome reversal of previous policy.

Early in 1540 Cromwell's religiously conservative, aristocratic enemies, headed by the Duke of Norfolk and supported by Stephen Gardiner, Bishop of Winchester (given the nickname "Wily Winchester" by polemical historian John Foxe for his mischievous counsels to the King) decided that the country's trend towards "doctrinal radicalism" in religion, as expressed in a series of parliamentary debates held throughout that spring, had gone too far. They saw in Catherine Howard, Norfolk's niece, "considerately put in the King's way by that pander, her uncle of Norfolk", an opportunity to displace their foe. Catherine's assignations with the King were openly facilitated by the Duke and the Bishop and as she "strode...towards the throne" the two conspirators found themselves edging once more into political power. It would have been a simple matter for Cromwell to arrange an annulment of Henry's marriage to the tractable Anne, but this would have put him in greater jeopardy as it would clear the way for Catherine to marry the King. At this point, however, cynical self-interest may have made Henry hesitate to act immediately against Cromwell, as the minister was guiding two important revenue bills (the Subsidy Bill—whereby Cromwell sought to extend the principle that taxation could be levied for general government purposes rather than a specified objective—and a bill to confiscate the assets of the Order of St John) through Parliament; Henry was anxious that any unpopularity caused by the measures would fall on Cromwell and not himself.

Cromwell was arrested at a Council meeting at Westminster on 10 June 1540 and accused of various charges. "Cromwell may have been arrested for his promotion of religious reformation, but few could doubt that Henry was also punishing Cromwell for the humiliation of his latest marriage." His enemies took every opportunity to humiliate him: The Duke of Norfolk snatched the St George's collar (insignia of the Order of the Garter) from Cromwell's shoulders, saying: "A traitor must not wear it", while the prisoner's former friend Sir William Fitzwilliam, Earl of Southampton untied the ceremonial garter of the Order. His initial reaction was defiance: "This then is my reward for faithful service!" he cried out, and angrily defied his fellow councillors to call him a traitor. He was taken by barge to the Tower and imprisoned.

A bill of attainder containing a long list of indictments, including supporting Anabaptists, corrupt practices, (Note: Elton was unable to identify any surviving evidence of cash bribes or other practices that would have been considered corrupt in Cromwell's time.) leniency in matters of justice, acting for personal gain, protecting Protestants accused of heresy and thus failing to enforce the Act of Six Articles, and plotting to marry King Henry's daughter Mary, was introduced into the House of Lords a week later. It was augmented with a further charge of sacramentarianism, for which the Six Articles allowed only the death penalty, two days after that. It passed on 29 June 1540.

All Cromwell's honours were forfeited and it was publicly proclaimed that he could be called only "Thomas Cromwell, cloth carder". The King deferred the execution until his marriage to Anne of Cleves could be annulled; Cromwell was being spared for the time being in case he was needed to give evidence of the King's distaste for Anne. Anne, however, agreed to an amicable annulment (and was treated with great generosity by Henry as a result). Hoping for clemency, Cromwell wrote in support of the annulment, in his last personal address to the King. He ended the letter: "Most gracious Prince, I cry for mercy, mercy, mercy."

Cromwell was condemned to death without trial, lost all his titles and property and was publicly beheaded on Tower Hill on 28 July 1540, on the same day as the King's marriage to Catherine Howard. Cromwell made a prayer and speech on the scaffold, professing to die "in the traditional [Catholic] faith" and denying that he had aided heretics. This was a necessary disavowal, to protect his family. Two contemporary sources report that he addressed the poet Thomas Wyatt from the scaffold, asking Wyatt to pray for him. (Note: Wyatt had enjoyed Cromwell's patronage and protection. According to the contemporary Spanish Chronicle, Cromwell's words to Wyatt were: "Gentle Wyatt, God be with you, and I pray you to pray God for me"; Wyatt was so overcome with tears that he could not respond. A contemporary English account quotes Cromwell's last words as "Farewell Wyat. / & gentell Wiat praye for me.") The circumstances of his execution are a source of debate: while some accounts state that the executioner had great difficulty severing his head, others claim that this is apocryphal and that it took only one blow. Afterwards, his head was set on a spike on London Bridge.

Edward Hall said of Cromwell's downfall,

Many lamented but more rejoiced, and specially such as either had been religious men, or favoured religious persons; for they banqueted and triumphed together that night, many wishing that that day had been seven years before; and some fearing lest he should escape, although he were imprisoned, could not be merry. Others who knew nothing but truth by him both lamented him and heartily prayed for him. But this is true that of certain of the clergy he was detestably hated, & specially of such as had borne swynge [beaten hard], and by his means was put from it; for in deed he was a man that in all his doings seemed not to favour any kind of Popery, nor could not abide the snoffyng pride of some prelates, which undoubtedly, whatsoever else was the cause of his death, did shorten his life and procured the end that he was brought unto.

Henry came to regret Cromwell's killing and later accused his ministers of bringing about Cromwell's downfall by "pretexts" and "false accusations". Over important issues and policies, he had always been liable to be manoeuvred into a hasty decision by the intrigues of the factions within his court. On 3 March 1541, the French ambassador, Charles de Marillac, reported in a letter that the King was now said to be lamenting that,

under pretext of some slight offences which he had committed, they had brought several accusations against him, on the strength of which he had put to death the most faithful servant he ever had.

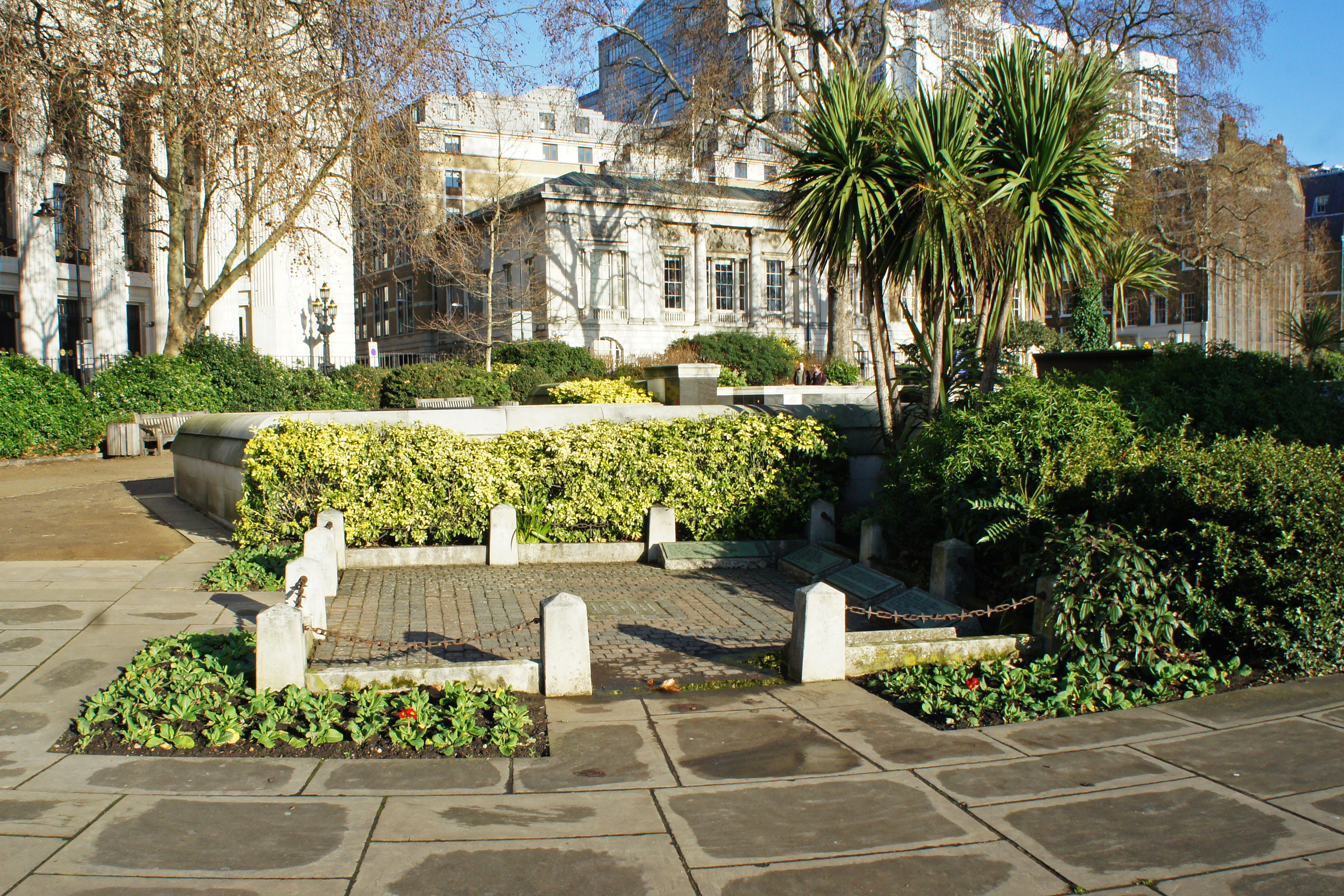
Site of the ancient scaffold at Tower Hill, adjoining the Tower of London, where Cromwell was decapitated

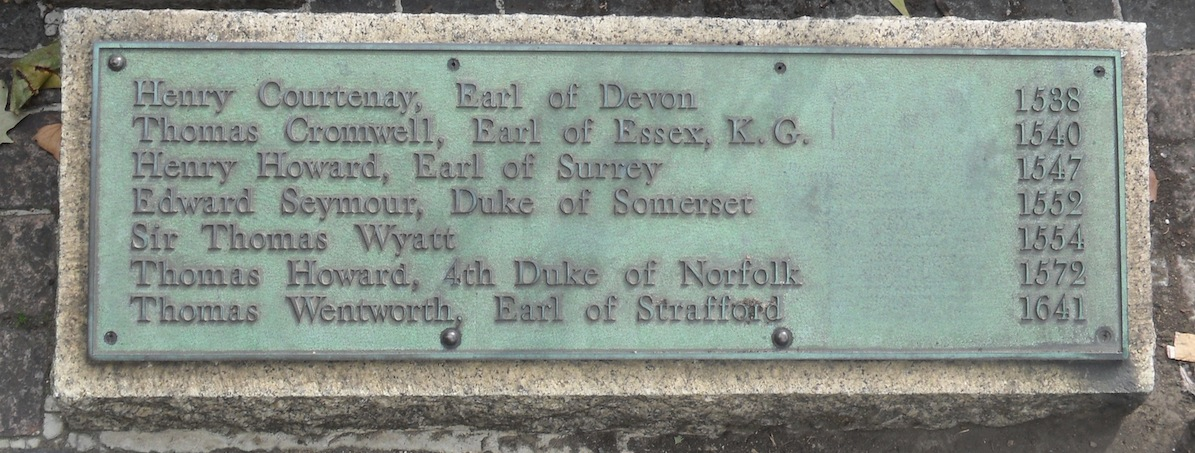
Plaque at the ancient scaffold site on Tower Hill commemorating Cromwell and others executed at the site

Cromwell's sudden and catastrophic demise has not been satisfactorily explained. In April 1540, just three months before he went to the block, and less than two months before he was arrested, he was created Earl of Essex and Lord Great Chamberlain. However, by the end of his reign Henry had become so bloodthirsty and suspicious that any far-fetched and ridiculous story of Cromwell's treachery (such as his planning to marry princess Mary to become king himself) could be exploited by the minister's enemies in order to destroy him.

== Personal religious beliefs ==
Although Cromwell always maintained a primarily political outlook on general affairs, there is consensus among scholars that at least while he held power he was a Protestant, with a Lutheran mindset. For him, the Henrician Reformation was certainly more than a jurisdictional revolution masquerading in religious garb. For instance, in the mid-1530s, he promoted Protestant ideas to forge an alliance with German Lutheran states, but his support for the Protestant cause is too general to be accurately explained in narrow political terms.

In 1535, Cromwell succeeded in having clearly identified reformers, such as Hugh Latimer, Edward Foxe and Nicholas Shaxton, appointed to the episcopacy. He encouraged and supported the work of reformers, such as Robert Barnes; and he obtained the licence to publish the Matthew's Bible, providing significant funding for the printing of this English translation of the Bible and sending one to every parish in England. By 1538, it was compulsory for all churches to own a Bible, in accordance with Cromwell's injunctions. The revised version, the Great Bible, was widely available by 1539 and included a picture of Henry VIII, Thomas Cranmer and Cromwell on the title page.

When Cromwell fell from favour in 1540, his alleged support for Anabaptism was cited. Although the charge was spurious, the fact that it was levelled at all demonstrates the reputation for evangelical sympathies Cromwell had developed.

== Historical significance ==
Until the 1950s, historians discounted Cromwell's role, stating he was little more than the agent of the despotic King Henry VIII. The 1911 Encyclopædia Britannica article (written by Albert Pollard) states "his power has been overrated." Geoffrey Elton, however, in The Tudor Revolution (1953), featured him as the central figure in the Tudor revolution in government, the presiding genius, much more so than the King, in handling the break with Rome and in creating the laws and administrative procedures that reshaped post-Reformation England. Elton wrote that Cromwell had been responsible for translating royal supremacy into parliamentary terms, creating powerful new organs of government to take charge of Church lands, and largely removing the medieval features of central government.

Subsequent historians have agreed with Elton as to Cromwell's importance, though not with his claims of "revolution". Leithead (2004) wrote, "Against significant opposition he secured acceptance of the king's new powers, created a more united and more easily governable kingdom, and provided the crown, at least temporarily, with a very significant landed endowment." Diarmaid MacCulloch credits the advancement of the most significant politicians and administrators of the reign of Queen Elizabeth I, including William Cecil and Nicholas Bacon, to the influence and guidance of Thomas Cromwell at the start of their careers.

During Cromwell's years in power, he skilfully managed Crown finances and extended royal authority. In 1536, he established the Court of Augmentations to handle the massive windfall to the royal coffers from the Dissolution of the Monasteries. Two other important financial institutions, the Court of Wards and the Court of First Fruits and Tenths, owed their existence to him, although they were not set up until after his death. He strengthened royal authority in the north of England, through reform of the Council of the North, extended royal power and introduced Protestantism in Ireland, and was the architect of the Laws in Wales Acts 1535 and 1542, which promoted stability and gained acceptance for the royal supremacy in Wales. He also introduced important social and economic reforms in England in the 1530s, including action against enclosures, the promotion of English cloth exports and the poor relief legislation of 1536.

== Descendants ==
Thomas Cromwell's son Gregory Cromwell, 1st Baron Cromwell, married Elizabeth Seymour, the sister of Queen Jane Seymour and widow of Sir Anthony Ughtred. They had five children:

- Henry Cromwell, 2nd Baron Cromwell
- Edward Cromwell
- Thomas Cromwell
- Katherine Cromwell
- Frances Cromwell

Thomas Cromwell had an illegitimate daughter called Jane.

Puritan leader Oliver Cromwell was the great-grandson of Sir Richard Cromwell, Thomas Cromwell's nephew.

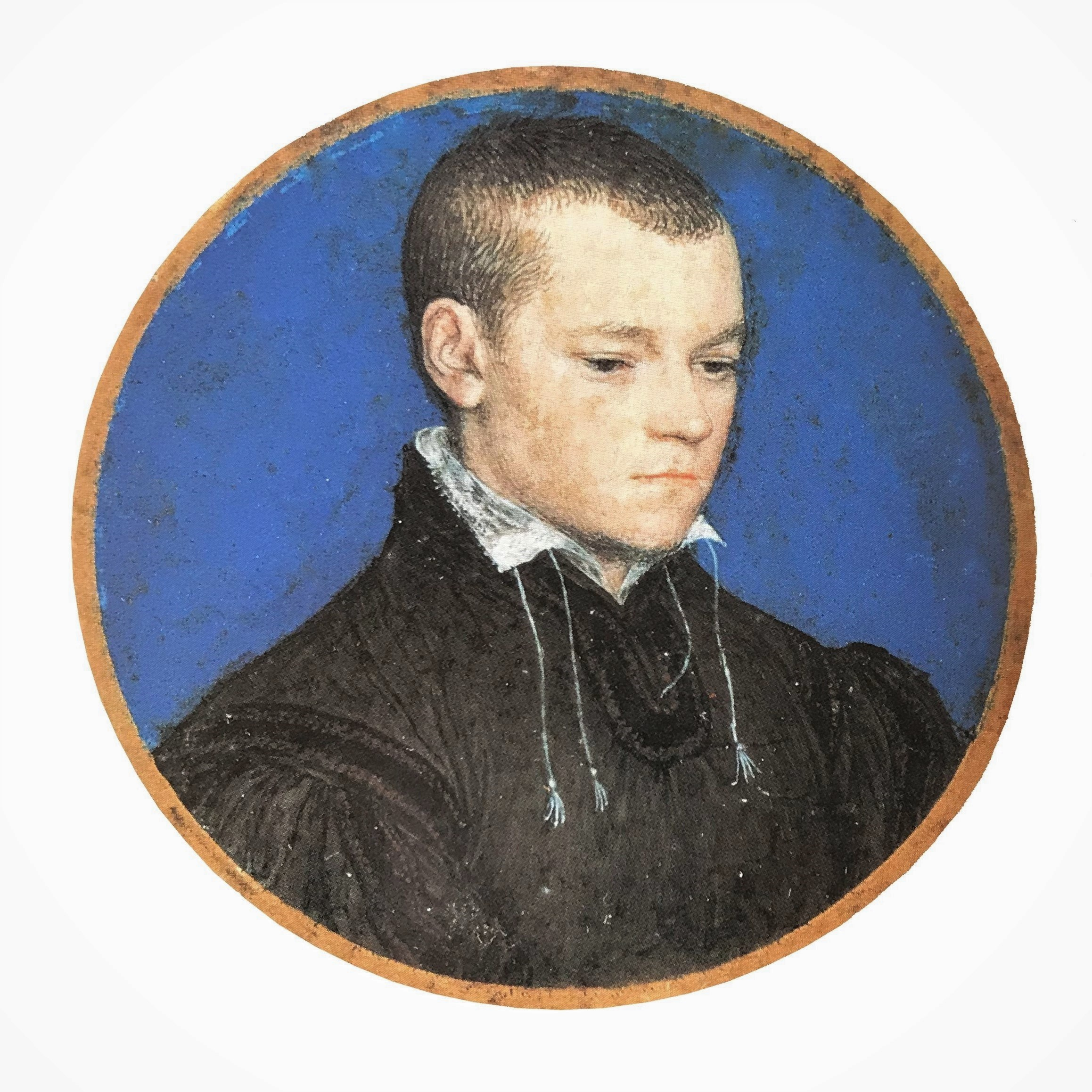
Portrait of a Young Man, perhaps Gregory Cromwell, Hans Holbein the Younger

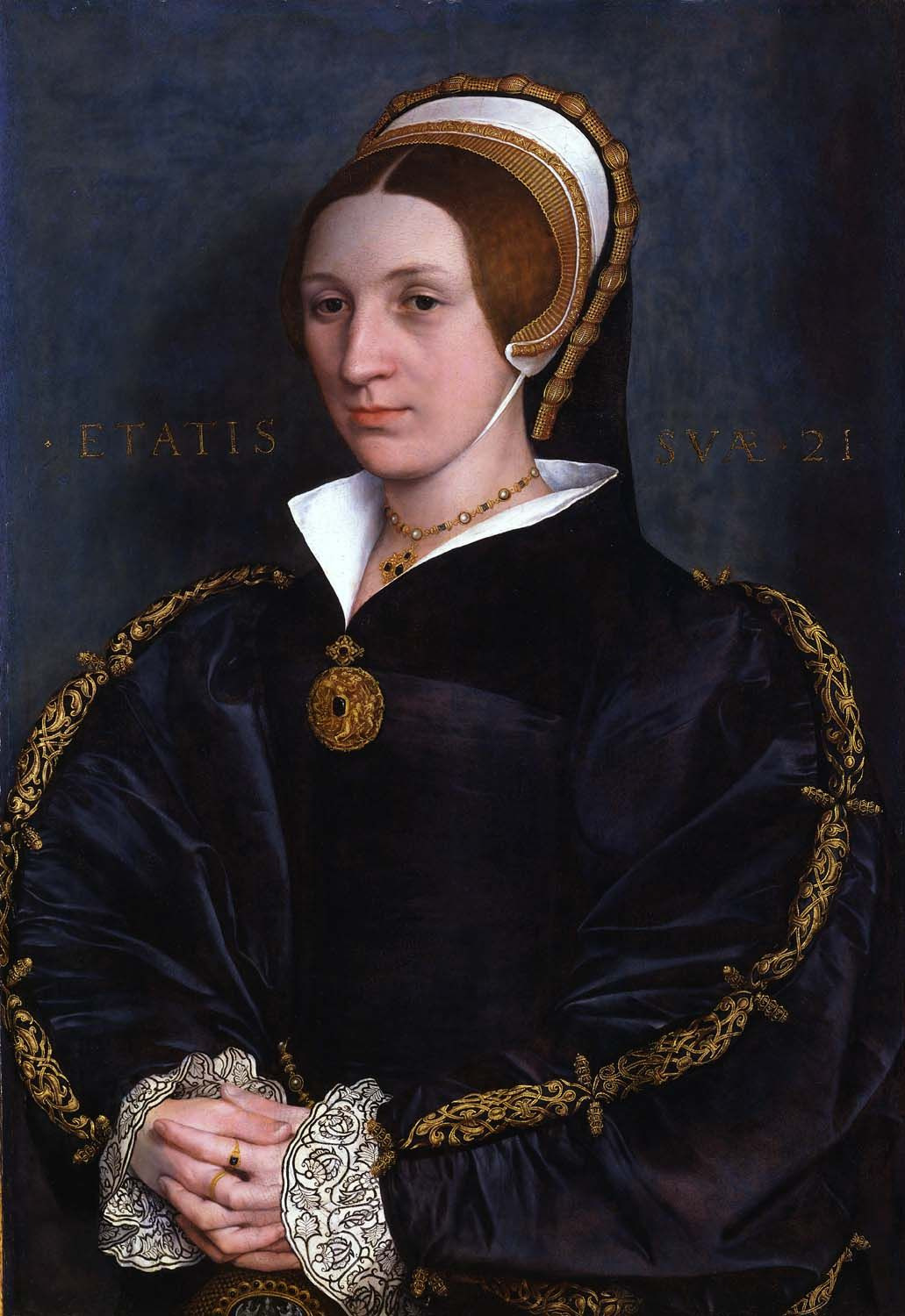
Portrait of a Lady, perhaps Elizabeth Seymour, Hans Holbein the Younger

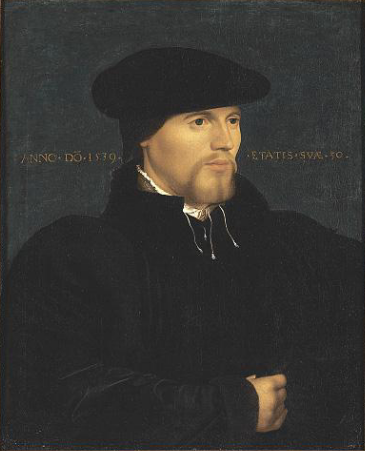
Portrait of a Man in Black, perhaps Sir Richard Cromwell

Oliver Cromwell

== Hans Holbein portraits ==
Thomas Cromwell was a patron of Hans Holbein the Younger, as were Thomas More and Anne Boleyn. In the New York Frick Collection, two portraits by Holbein hang facing each other on the same wall of the Study, one depicting Thomas Cromwell, the other Thomas More, Cromwell's executed political and religious opponent. In 2023, the Book of Hours depicted in the Frick Collection portrait of Cromwell was put on display at Hever Castle, Kent.

== Fictional portrayals ==
Cromwell has been portrayed in a number of plays, feature films, and television miniseries, usually as a villainous character. More recently, however, Hilary Mantel's two Man Booker Prize-winning novels Wolf Hall (2009) and Bring up the Bodies (2012), and the final volume in the trilogy, The Mirror & the Light (2020), have shown Cromwell in a more sympathetic light. In the novels, Cromwell is imbued with family affections, genuine respect for Cardinal Wolsey, zeal for the Reformation, and support for a limited degree of social reform, while the villainous character is Thomas More.

The television series Wolf Hall (2015) is based on the first two of the novels in Mantel's trilogy, while its sequel Wolf Hall: The Mirror and the Light (2024) is based on the third.

== Bibliography ==
- Angus, Caroline (2022). The Private Life of Thomas Cromwell. Yorkshire: Pen & Sword. ISBN 9781399095815.
- Beazley, F. C. (1908). Notes on the Parish of Burton in Wirrall. Illustrated with seven plates and numerous coats of arms drawn by Graham Johnston, Herald Painter to the Lyon Court. Liverpool: Henry Young & Sons.
- Bernard, George W. (October 1998). "Elton's Cromwell". History. 83 (272): 587–607. doi:10.1111/1468-229X.00088. ISSN 1468-229X. at Wiley Online Library
- —— (2007). The King's reformation : Henry VIII and the remaking of the English church. Yale University Press. ISBN 9780300109085.
- Bindoff, S. T. (Stanley Thomas) (1982). The House of Commons, 1509-1558. London : Published for the History of Parliament Trust by Boydell and Brewer. ISBN 978-0-436-04282-9.
- Blomefield, Francis (1808). "Launditch Hundred: Elmham". An Essay Towards a Topographical History of the County of Norfolk. Vol. 9. British-history.ac.uk.
- Bordo, Susan (2014). The Creation of Anne Boleyn. Oneworld Publications. ISBN 9781780744292.
- Borman, Tracy (2014). Thomas Cromwell : the untold story of Henry VIII's most faithful servant. Hodder & Stoughton. ISBN 9781444782875.
- Brigden, Susan (June 1981). "Popular Disturbance and the Fall of Thomas Cromwell and the Reformers, 1539–1540". Historical Journal. 24 (2): 257–278. doi:10.1017/s0018246x0000546x. JSTOR 2638786. S2CID 154423447.
- "Calendar of State Papers, Spain" – via British History Online.
- Bucholz, Robert; Key, Newton (2004). Early Modern England, 1485–1714 : a narrative history. Oxford, England: Blackwell. ISBN 0-631-21392-9.
- Coby, J. Patrick (2009). Thomas Cromwell: Machiavellian Statecraft and the English Reformation. Lanham: Lexington Books. ISBN 978-0739134030.
- Cokayne, G.E. (1913). Gibbs, Vicary; Doubleday, H. Arthur (eds.). The Complete Peerage of England, Scotland, Ireland, Great Britain and the United Kingdom. Vol. III. London: St Catherine Press.
- Dodds, Madeleine Hope; Dodds, Ruth (1915). The Pilgrimage of Grace 1536–1537 and the Exeter Conspiracy 1538. Vol. 2. Cambridge University Press. OCLC 459254169.
- Edwards, P. S. (1982). "HOUGH, Richard (1505–73/74), of Leighton and Thornton Hough, Cheshire.". In Bindoff, S. T. (ed.). Members. The History of Parliament: The House of Commons 1509–1558. Vol. 2: Members D–M. London: Published for The History of Parliament Trust by Secker & Warburg. ISBN 978-0436042829. Archived from the original on 3 January 2015.
- Elton, Geoffrey (1951). "Thomas Cromwell's Decline and Fall". Cambridge Historical Journal. 10 (2): 150–185. doi:10.1017/S1474691300002766. JSTOR 3021084.
- —— (1953). The Tudor Revolution in Government: Administrative Changes in the Reign of Henry VIII. Cambridge University Press.
- —— (1956). "The Political Creed of Thomas Cromwell". Transactions of the Royal Historical Society. Fifth Series. 6: 69–92. doi:10.2307/3678841. JSTOR 3678841. S2CID 144735978.
- —— (1973). Reform and Renewal: Thomas Cromwell and the Common Weal. Cambridge: Cambridge University Press. ISBN 978-0521200547.
- —— (1974). "King or Minister? The Man behind the Henrician Reformation". Studies in Tudor and Stuart Politics and Government. Vol. I. Cambridge: Cambridge University Press. pp. 173–188. doi:10.1017/CBO9780511561092.010. ISBN 9780511561092.
- —— (1974). "An Early Tudor Poor Law". Studies in Tudor and Stuart Politics and Government. Vol. II. London: Cambridge University Press. pp. 137–154. doi:10.1017/CBO9780511561108.006. ISBN 9780511561108. Archived from the original on 5 March 2016.
- —— (1985). Policy and Police: The Enforcement of the Reformation in the Age of Thomas Cromwell. Cambridge: Cambridge University Press. ISBN 9780521313094.
- —— (1991). Thomas Cromwell. Headstart History Papers. Bangor: Headstart History. ISBN 978-1873041154.
- —— (1991). England Under the Tudors (3rd ed.). London: Routledge. ISBN 9780415065337.
- —— (December 1993). "How Corrupt was Thomas Cromwell?". Historical Journal. 36 (4): 905–908. doi:10.1017/s0018246x00014552. JSTOR 2640037. S2CID 159983157.
- Everett, Michael (2015). The Rise of Thomas Cromwell: Power and Politics in the Reign of Henry VIII, 1485–1534. New Haven: Yale University Press. ISBN 9780300213089.
- Fitzgerald, Teri; MacCulloch, Diarmaid (2016). "Gregory Cromwell: two portrait miniatures by Hans Holbein the Younger". The Journal of Ecclesiastical History. 67 (3): 587–601. doi:10.1017/S0022046915003322.(subscription required)
- —— (18 August 2019). "All that Glitters: Hans Holbein's Lady of the Cromwell Family". queenanneboleyn.com. Archived from the original on 20 September 2019.
- —— (5 March 2020). "Sir Richard Cromwell: A King's Diamond". queenanneboleyn.com. Archived from the original on 31 July 2023.
- Foley, Stephen Merriam (1990). Sir Thomas Wyatt. Twayne's English authors series 475. Boston: Twayne Publishers. ISBN 978-0-8057-6992-0.
- Froude, James Anthony (1856). History of England from the Fall of Wolsey to the Death of Elizabeth. Vol. I (2011 ed.). Cambridge University Press.
- Glover, Robert (1882). Rylands, John Paul (ed.). The Visitation of Cheshire in the year 1580, made by Robert Glover, Somerset Herald, for William Flower, Norroy King of Arms: with numerous additions and continuations, including those from the Visitation of Cheshire made in the year 1566 by the same herald : with an appendix containing the Visitation of a part of Cheshire in the year 1533, made by William Fellows, Lancaster Herald, for Thomas Benolte, Clarenceux King of Arms : and a fragment of the Visitation of the city of Chester in the year 1591, made by Thomas Chaloner, Deputy to the Office of Arms. Publications of the Harleian Society. Vol. 18. London: Harleian Society.
- Hall, Edward (1548). Hall's chronicle; containing the history of England, during the reign of Henry the Fourth, and the succeeding monarchs, to the end of the reign of Henry the Eighth, in which are particularly described the manners and customs of those periods (1809 ed.). London: Printed for J. Johnson; F. C. and J. Rivington; T. Payne; Wilkie and Robinson; Longman, Hurst, Rees and Orme; Cadell and Davies; and J. Mawman. OCLC 2350867.
- Hawkyard, A.D.K. (1982). "Cromwell, Gregory (by 1516–51), of Lewes, Suss.; Leeds Castle, Kent and Launde, Leics.". In Bindoff, S.T. (ed.). Members. The History of Parliament: The House of Commons 1509–1558. Vol. 1: Appendices, constituencies, members A–C. London, UK: History of Parliament Trust by Secker & Warburg. ISBN 978-0436042829.
- Head, David M (1995). The Ebbs and Flows of Fortune: The Life of Thomas Howard, Third Duke of Norfolk. Athens, GA: University of Georgia. ISBN 9780820316833.
- Hoby, Thomas (1902). Powell, Edgar (ed.). The Travels and Life of Sir Thomas Hoby, Kt of Bisham Abbey, written by himself, 1547–1564. Royal Historical Society. Publications. Vol. X. London, UK: Royal Historical Society.
- Hoyle, R. W. (Richard W.) (2001). The pilgrimage of grace and the politics of the 1530s. Oxford: Oxford University Press. ISBN 1-280-44586-6. OCLC 252554853.
- Hutchinson, Robert (2008). Thomas Cromwell: The Rise and Fall of Henry VIII's Most Notorious Minister. London: Phoenix. ISBN 978-0-7538-2361-3.
- Ives, E. W. (2004). "Anne [Anne Boleyn]". Oxford Dictionary of National Biography (online ed.). Oxford University Press. doi:10.1093/ref:odnb/557. (Subscription, Wikipedia Library access or UK public library membership required.)
- —— (2005). The Life and Death of Anne Boleyn: 'The Most Happy'. Blackwell Publishing. ISBN 978-1-4051-3463-7.
- Kenyon, John Philipps (1983). The History Men: The Historical Profession in England Since the Renaissance. London: Weidenfeld & Nicolson. ISBN 978-0297780816.
- Kinney, Arthur; Swain, David W. (2001). Tudor England: An Encyclopedia. Garland. ISBN 978-0815307938.
- Leithead, Howard (January 2008) [first published 2004]. "Cromwell, Thomas, earl of Essex". Oxford Dictionary of National Biography (online ed.). Oxford University Press. doi:10.1093/ref:odnb/6769. (Subscription, Wikipedia Library access or UK public library membership required.)
- "Letters and Papers, Foreign and Domestic, Henry VIII" – via British History Online.
- Limper-Herz, Karen (2023). "King Henry VIII's copy of the 'Great Bible'". In Marks, P.J.M.; Parkin, Stephen (eds.). The Book By Design. University of Chicago. ISBN 9780226824093.
- Lipscomb, Suzannah (April 2013). "Why Did Anne Boleyn Have to Die". BBC History Magazine. Vol. 14, no. 4. pp. 18–24.
- Loades, David (2012). Catherine Howard: The Adulterous Wife of Henry VIII. Stroud, England: Amberley. ISBN 9781445613536.
- —— (2013). Thomas Cromwell. Servant to Henry VIII. Stroud, England: Amberley. ISBN 9781445640013.
- Logan, F. Donald (July 1988). "Thomas Cromwell and the Vicegerency in Spirituals: A Revisitation". English Historical Review. 103 (408): 658–667. doi:10.1093/ehr/ciii.ccccviii.658.
- MacCulloch, Diarmaid (2018). Thomas Cromwell: A Life. London: Allen Lane. ISBN 9780141967660.
- Merriman, R.B. (1902). The Life and letters of Thomas Cromwell. Vol. I: Life, Letters to 1535. Oxford, UK: Clarendon Press.
- Noble, Mark (1787). Memoirs of the Protectoral House of Cromwell. Vol. II (3rd ed.). London: G.G.J. and J. Robinson.
- Ormerod, George (1819). History of Cheshire, The History of the County Palatine and city of Chester. Vol. II. London: Printed for Lackington, Hughes. Harding, Mavor, and Jones.
- Richardson, Douglas (2011). Everingham, Kimball G. (ed.). Magna Carta Ancestry: A Study in Colonial and Medieval Families. Vol. III (2nd ed.). Douglas Richardson. p. 111. ISBN 978-1461045205.
- —— (2011). —— (ed.). Plantagenet Ancestry: A Study in Colonial and Medieval Families. Vol. I (2nd ed.). CreateSpace. ISBN 978-1461045137.
- Scarisbrick, John (2008). Henry VIII. Berkeley, CA: University of California Press. ISBN 9780520011304.
- Schofield, John (2011). The Rise & Fall of Thomas Cromwell: Henry VIII's Most Faithful Servant. The History Press. ISBN 978-0-7524-5866-3.
- Starkey, David (2003). Six Wives: The Queens of Henry VIII. Chatto and Windus. ISBN 0-701-17298-3.
- Strype, John (1822). Ecclesiastical Memorials. Vol. II. Oxford, UK: Clarendon Press.
- Walford, Edward (1878). "Putney". Old and New London. Vol. 6. British-history.ac.uk. pp. 489–503.
- Wark, K. R. (1971). Elizabethan Recusancy in Cheshire (hardback). Remains Historical and Literary Connected with the Palatine Counties of Lancaster and Chester. 3rd series. Vol. 19. Manchester: Manchester University Press for the Chetham Society. ISBN 978-0-7190-1154-2.
- Warnicke, Retha M. (January 2008) [first published 2004]. "Katherine [Catherine] [née Katherine Howard]". Oxford Dictionary of National Biography (online ed.). Oxford University Press. doi:10.1093/ref:odnb/4892. (Subscription, Wikipedia Library access or UK public library membership required.)
- —— (2000). The Marrying of Anne of Cleves royal protocol in early modern England. Cambridge University Press. ISBN 0-521-77037-8.
- Weir, Alison (1991). The Six Wives of Henry VIII. New York: Grove Weidenfeld. ISBN 978-0802114976.
- Williams, Neville (1975). The Cardinal & the Secretary. London: Weidenfeld and Nicolson. ISBN 978-0-297-76960-6.
- Winchester, Barbara (1955). Tudor Family Portrait. London, UK: Jonathan Cape. OCLC 581085750.
- Wriothesley, Charles (1875). Hamilton, William Douglas (ed.). "A Chronicle Of England During The Reigns Of The Tudors: From A.D. 1485 To 1559". Camden Society. New Series. London: Camden Society. OCLC 1096776828, 73998658.

Political offices
Preceded by John Bourchier	Chancellor of the Exchequer; 1533–1540	Succeeded by John Baker
Preceded by Stephen Gardiner	Secretary of State; 1534–1540	Succeeded by Thomas Wriothesley; Ralph Sadler
Preceded by John Taylor	Master of the Rolls; 1534–1536	Succeeded by Christopher Hales
Preceded by Thomas Boleyn	Lord Privy Seal; 1536–1540	Succeeded by William Fitzwilliam
Preceded by James Worsley	Governor of the Isle of Wight; 1538–1540	Vacant Title next held by John Paulet
Preceded by The 15th Earl of Oxford	Lord Great Chamberlain; 1540	Succeeded by The 16th Earl of Oxford
Legal offices
Preceded by The Lord Darcy de Darcy	Justice in Eyre; North of the Trent; 1537–1540	Succeeded by The Earl of Rutland
