= Coronation of Queen Elizabeth =

Coronation of Queen Elizabeth may refer to:

- Coronation of Elizabeth I in 1559
- Coronation of Elizabeth Bowes-Lyon in 1937
- Coronation of Elizabeth II in 1953
