= Coronation of Elizabeth =

Coronation of Elizabeth may refer to:

- Coronation of Elizabeth I
- Coronation of Elizabeth II
