= Act of Succession =

Act of Succession may refer to:

- Swedish Act of Succession
- Succession to the Crown Act (disambiguation), several English bills
- Danish Act of Succession
- Bolesław III of Poland' Act of Succession (1138)
