= Coronation of Elizabeth I =

1559 coronation in England

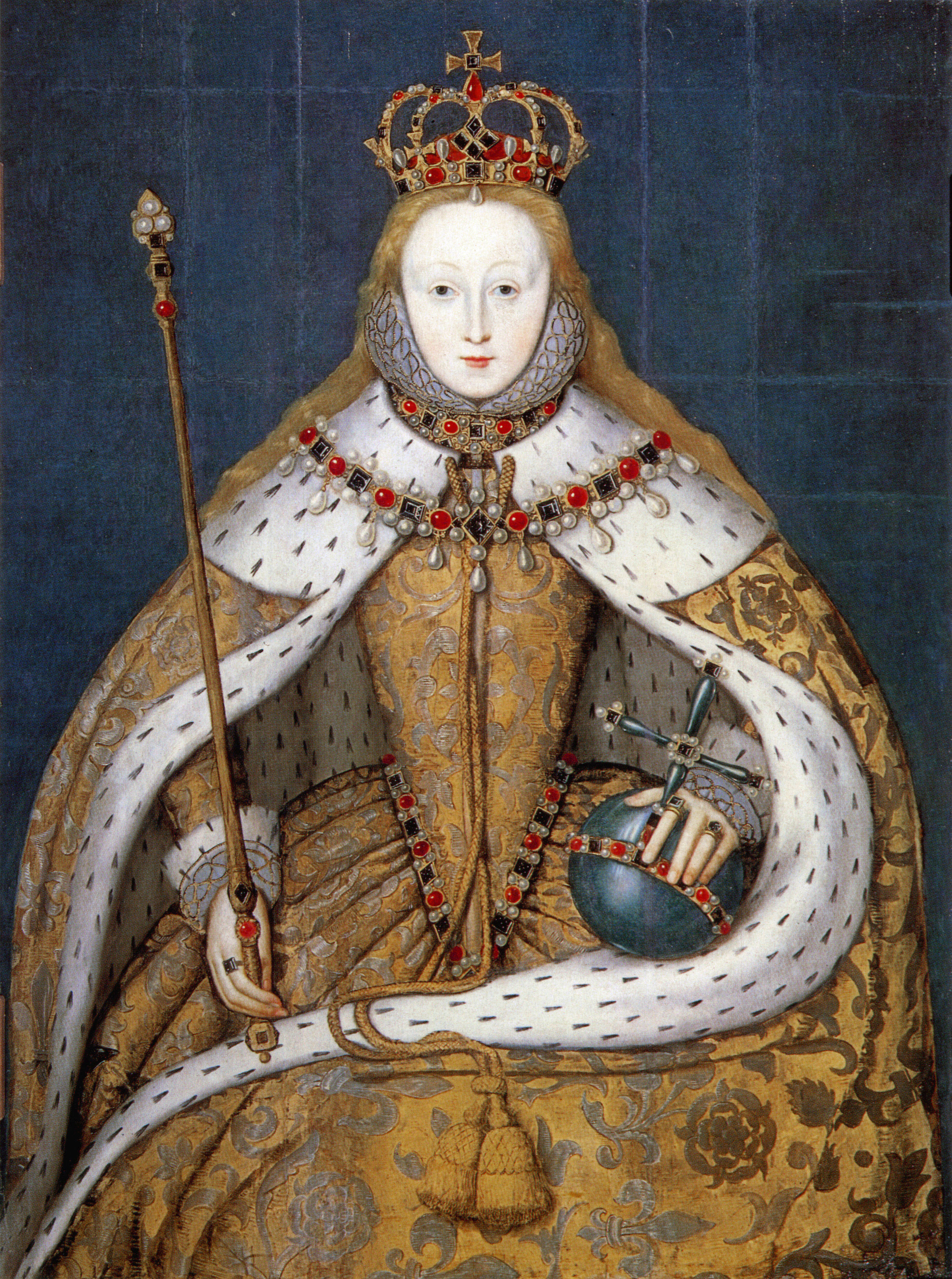
- Elizabeth I of England in her coronation robe; a miniature of circa 1600, after a lost original
- Date: 15 January 1559; 467 years ago
- Location: Westminster Abbey, London, England
- Participants: Queen Elizabeth I; Great Officers of State; Bishops of the Catholic Church; Peers of the realm

The coronation of Elizabeth I as Queen of England and Ireland took place at Westminster Abbey, London, on 15 January 1559. Elizabeth I ascended the throne at the age of 25 upon the death of her half-sister, Mary I, on 17 November 1558. Mary had reversed the Protestant Reformation which had been started by her two predecessors, so this was the last coronation in Great Britain to be conducted under the authority of the Catholic Church. Historians view Elizabeth's coronation as a statement of her intention to restore England to Protestantism, but to allow the continuation of some Catholic customs, a compromise known as the Elizabethan Settlement.

== Background ==
The reign of Elizabeth I's father, Henry VIII, was one of great political and social change. Religious upheaval in continental Europe and Henry's dispute with the Pope over his marital difficulties led Henry to break from the Catholic Church and to establish the Church of England. Henry VIII was succeeded by his son Edward VI, under whom the Protestant reforms continued. However, Edward's early death in 1553 led to the accession of Henry's daughter Mary I. She returned England to Catholicism, burning at the stake some 300 Protestants as heretics and forcing others into exile. The Protestant-minded Elizabeth outwardly conformed with Mary, but became the focus of opposition to the increasingly unpopular government. Mary became ill in May 1558 and formally recognised Elizabeth as her heir presumptive on 6 November. Elizabeth was at Hatfield House to the north of London when she was informed of Mary's death on 17 November.

== Preparations ==
Elizabeth I's first surviving state paper is dated 17 November 1558, the day of her accession, and is a memorandum for the appointment of "Commissioners for the Coronation"; a month later five had been selected, with Sir Richard Sackville taking charge. The date of Sunday 15 January 1559 was set: not, as in previous coronations, an appropriate Christian holy day but, following the advice of her court astrologer, Dr John Dee, one on which the stars and planets would be in favourable positions. The brief time between accession and coronation was also a product of Elizabeth's concern over her legal status; the First Succession Act of 1533 and the Second Succession Act of 1536 had declared both Mary and Elizabeth to be bastards and excluded them from the line of succession. Although the Third Succession Act of 1543/44 had restored their place in the succession, it had not restored their legitimacy. Elizabeth consulted Sir Nicholas Bacon, the Lord Keeper of the Great Seal, who warned against attempting to repeal the Succession Acts and the tangle of legislation relating to them. Instead, he advised that following her coronation, Elizabeth's right to rule would be beyond question since "the English laws have long since pronounced, That the Crowne once worn quite taketh away all Defects whatsoever".

Coronation festivities at that time consisted of four parts: the vigil procession to the Tower of London where the monarch would spend one or more nights in vigil; on the day before the coronation, the royal entry procession through the streets of the City of London to the Palace of Westminster; the coronation service itself in Westminster Abbey, and finally the coronation banquet in Westminster Hall. Although the religious ceremony at Westminster Abbey was theoretically the main event, Elizabeth was aware that it was the elaborate processions through London which would secure the new queen's popularity with her subjects: not a foregone conclusion given that she was an unmarried woman, that her claim to the throne rested on her executed mother and that there was likely to be a further period of religious upheaval. The queen spent some £16,000 of her own money on the coronation, while the aldermen, livery companies and merchants of the City contributed a very substantial amount; exactly how much is unknown. Unusually, the foreign merchants of the city were forbidden to contribute, making it a purely English display of loyalty; this contrasted with Queen Mary's procession, in which the most elaborate displays had been provided by merchants from Genoa and Florence. The stridently Protestant overtone of the royal entry pageantry not only reflected the desire of the City establishment for religious reform; the involvement of the Revels Office and the Royal Wardrobe in the preparations suggest at least a foreknowledge, if not active direction, by Elizabeth and her government.

It was not obvious which bishop should conduct the coronation service. That role traditionally fell to the archbishop of Canterbury, but the incumbent Reginald Pole had died of influenza on 17 November, only 12 hours after Queen Mary, and in the uncertainty of the new regime, a successor had yet to be appointed. The archbishop of York, Nicholas Heath, was a committed but moderate Catholic who had not participated in the burnings of Mary's reign. Although willing to attend the coronation, he declined to officiate because of the new queen's reforms at the Chapel Royal. The next in seniority, the bishop of London, Edmund Bonner, was unacceptable to Elizabeth because of his role in prosecuting heretics, earning him the epithet of "Bloody Bonner". The bishop of Winchester, John White, was under house arrest for the anti-Protestant sermon he had preached at Queen Mary's funeral, while the bishop of Chichester, John Christopherson, had died in prison on 28 December after preaching a similar sermon at St Paul's Cross. Several other leading bishops also declined; others were suffering the effects of the same epidemic which had claimed the life of Archbishop Pole. Finally, the low-ranking bishop of Carlisle, Owen Oglethorpe, was coerced into accepting the role. Oglethorpe had already displeased Elizabeth at the Christmas mass at the Chapel Royal, when he performed the Elevation of the Host, despite instructions to the contrary since Protestant reformers connected this ritual with transubstantiation; the Queen therefore walked out of the service before its conclusion.

== The state processions ==
The instructions and etiquette for Elizabeth's state processions were laid down in a book known as the Little Device, which had originally been compiled in 1377 for Richard II and had been used at most coronations since.

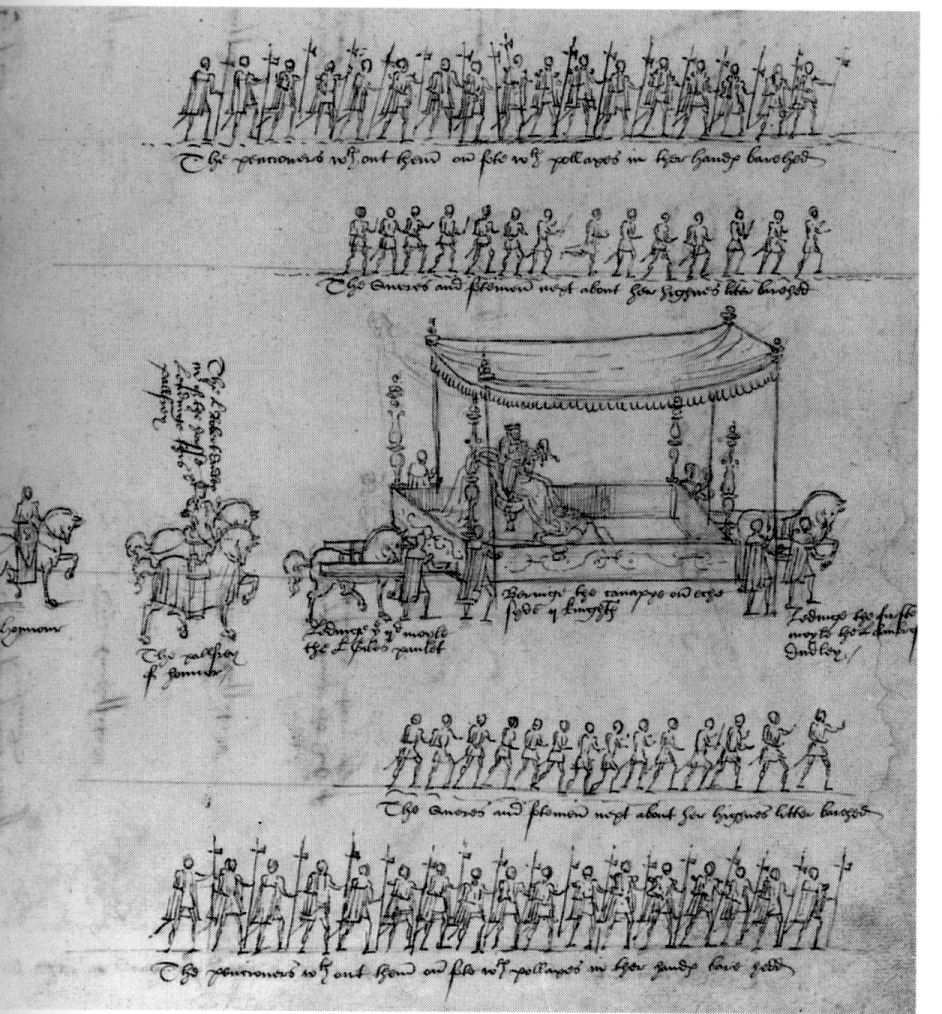
Queen Elizabeth's litter at her royal entry, accompanied footmen and Gentlemen Pensioners.

=== The vigil procession ===
An account of the vigil procession was made by Il Schifanoya, a native of the Italian duchy of Mantua who lived in London and regularly wrote accounts of events there to the Mantuan ambassador in Brussels and to the Castellan of Mantua. The procession on Thursday 12 January was on the Thames from Whitehall Palace to the Tower of London; the fleet of "ships, galleys, brigantines &c. were prepared as sumptuously as possible" which Il Schifanoya thought "reminded one of Ascension Day in Venice".

Attended by members of her court, Elizabeth embarked on her royal barge, which was covered with tapestries, both inside and out, and was towed by a galley rowed by 40 men with "a band of music". The procession passed under the arches of London Bridge on the flood tide, and approaching the Tower, an artillery salute was fired. The queen entered the Tower "by a little bridge".

=== The royal entry ===
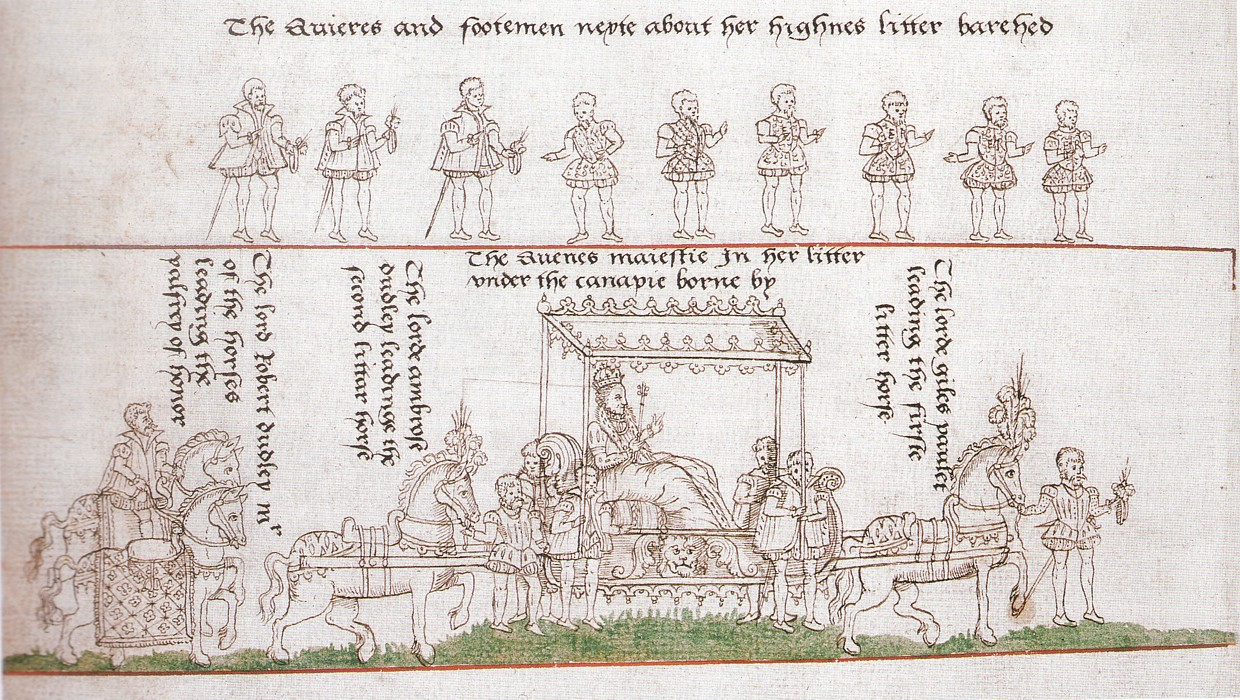
A contemporary depiction of the queen's litter. Robert Dudley, Master of the Horse, is on horseback on the far left, leading the palfrey of honour.

Starting at about 2 pm on Saturday 14 January, Elizabeth made her royal entry, a state procession from the Tower of London through the City of London and the western suburbs to the Palace of Westminster. Besides Il Schifanoya's account of the event, there is also a pamphlet called The Quene's Majestie's passage through the citie of London to westminster the day before her coronacion written by Richard Mulcaster, which was published almost immediately afterwards and had run to a second edition two months later. Il Schifanoya noted that it snowed a little; also that the route had been prepared with wooden barriers to hold back the crowds and that people had spread sand and gravel outside their houses to mitigate the muddy roads. The houses along the way were all decorated and the route lined with the City guildsmen in their hoods and black gowns, together with innumerable flags and banners. He reckoned that the whole procession consisted of a thousand horses. The queen was carried on a litter, covered in white cloth of gold and lined with pink satin. It was carried by two mules, attended on either side by a line of footmen in scarlet cloaks and escorted by a further line of Gentlemen Pensioners carrying halberds.

Elizabeth wore a gown of cloth of gold. Her hair was in a cloth of gold coif and she wore a gold circlet or plain gold crown on her head. Her lady in waiting, Kat Ashley, was given purple velvet and scarlet and tinsel fabrics to wear at this "Coronation eve". A plan of the procession made for the College of Arms lists all of the officers of the royal court, government ministers, judges, knights and baronets, peers, royal chaplains, bishops and archbishops, heralds, and foreign ambassadors. Towards the rear of the line were the ladies of the participants, the highest ranking in coaches or "chariots", others on horseback or on foot, and finally the royal henchmen and the Yeoman of the Guard.

Along the route, the city had devised a series of eleven triumphal arches and tableaux vivants or "pageants", each having a theme loaded with political and religious allegory. The first arch at Gracechurch Street was three storeys tall and was labelled "The vniting of the two houses of Lancastre and York"; upon it was a huge representation of a rose bush on which were large statues of Henry VII, Elizabeth of York, Henry VIII and Anne Boleyn, with Elizabeth seated in majesty at the very top, pointedly underlining the legitimacy of her succession. A small boy was perched above the central arch who gave an oration to the queen, explaining the details of the symbolism, to which the queen listened "most attentively, evincing much satisfaction".

Towards the western end of Cheapside, the Lord Mayor of London and the Aldermen awaited the queen. and Ranulph Cholmley, recorder of the City, made a speech and presented an embroidered crimson satin purse containing a thousand marks in gold to Elizabeth.

Perhaps the most elaborate and important pageant was staged further along Cheapside at the Little Conduit near St Paul's Cathedral, where a small tower housed a water cistern serving as the water supply for the area. The space was transformed with two artificial hills, one barren and wasted and the other green and fertile, representing bad and good governance. Between the hills, a cave had been constructed; upon the queen's arrival, an old man with wings and a scythe emerged representing "Time" followed by his daughter "Truth", carrying a book inscribed Verbum Veritatis. This was perhaps a satirical reference to Queen Mary's personal motto; Veritas Temporis Filia ("Truth the Daughter of Time"). Truth gave the book, a banned English translation of the New Testament, to the queen who kissed it, thanking the city for their gift.

At the Temple Bar Conduit, the queen saw herself portrayed in parliament robes as the Biblical judge Deborah accompanied by the three estates of England, the nobility, clergy, and commonalty. The pageant probably represented the forthcoming parliament which had already been summoned to decide the religious policy of the new government. The depiction of Elizabeth as Deborah was aimed at the supporters of Calvinist reformer John Knox, who in the previous year had published a polemic entitled The First Blast of the Trumpet Against the Monstruous Regiment of Women. This pamphlet, intended to undermine Queen Mary and Mary of Guise, the Dowager Queen of Scotland, claimed that female leadership was contrary to the laws of nature and to Biblical teaching. Knox's qualified this assertion in the case of Deborah, who had freed the Israelites from the Canaanites and led them to an era of peace and prosperity, and whom Knox claimed had been a God-given and miraculous exception for the salvation of his people. This representation of Parliament underscored Elizabeth's legitimacy as ruler by good counsel, following and building on the Little Conduit pageant where her rule appeared justified by the Word of God.

== The coronation service ==
The coronation service was held on Sunday 15 January. The Little Device stipulates that the monarch was to enter Westminster Hall at seven o'clock in the morning. After being censed by the archbishop of York, the queen walked the short distance to the abbey in procession, flanked by the Earls of Pembroke and Shrewsbury and her train carried by the Duchess of Norfolk. She was followed by other nobles carrying the coronation swords, the orb and three crowns which were borne by the Kings of Arms, all accompanied by the Choir of the Chapel Royal singing the processional hymn Salve festa dies ("Hail, Thou Festal Day").

The abbey was decorated with tapestries depicting the Acts of the Apostles and scenes from Genesis. A plan survives of the layout of the abbey for the service, showing the large platform which had been erected at the crossing which was accessed by a flight of twenty steps, itself surmounted by a further dais in the form of an octagon of five steps, and on top of that was placed St Edward's Chair, high above the congregation. The order of service followed the Liber Regalis, the abbey's transcript of the fourth recension of the coronation service, first used in the coronation of Edward II in 1308 and spoken in Latin for the last time before its translation into English in 1601. It would, however, be said in Latin again at the coronation of George I, because he did not speak enough English to take the oath and Parliament did not want him taking it in his native German. Also for the last time, the coronation included a Catholic mass. There was no universal text for the mass in the Catholic Church at that time, and in southern England, the Sarum Rite was generally used; however most major churches had their own variations on it, the abbey using their own version called the Litlyngton or Westminster Missal, dating from 1384.

The various accounts of the service describe the traditional phases of the coronation liturgy, starting with the Recognition. On the congregation being asked if they accepted Elizabeth as their queen, Il Schifanoya (who probably was not inside the abbey) reported that "they all shouted 'Yes'; and the organs, fifes, trumpets and drums playing, the bells also ringing, it seemed as if the world were come to an end". After making an offering of gold to the altar, the queen sat to listen to the sermon, although which bishop preached it is unknown. The coronation oath returned to the form used at Edward's coronation in 1547, but with an amendment to the wording, promising to rule according to the "true profession of the Gospel established in this Kingdom". The text of the oath was handed to Bishop Oglethorpe by Sir William Cecil, the new Secretary of State; this suggests that he was behind its formulation. Then followed the Anointing, the Investing and the actual Crowning, accompanied by the sounding of trumpets. At the Homage, it was significant that the Lords Temporal were the first to offer their loyalty, rather than the Lords Spiritual as was traditional.

The most controversial element of the ceremony was the Coronation Mass and Elizabeth's participation in it, since the three surviving eye-witness reports are either obscure or contradictory. There is no clear consensus amongst modern historians as to what actually occurred. It is evident that the Epistle and the Gospel were read in both Latin and English, a departure from the Catholic custom. At some point during the mass, Elizabeth withdrew to the "traverse", a curtained off area behind the high altar and next to St Edward's shrine, a private space in which the monarch could make the several changes of dress required for the ceremonial. David Starkey asserts that the mass was sung by Bishop Oglethorpe who elevated the host, prompting Elizabeth's early withdrawal. John Guy and Lisa Hilton both state that the royal chaplain, George Carew, sang the mass without elevation and administered Holy Communion to the queen inside the traverse. A. L. Rowse states that Oglethorpe sang the mass and that Elizabeth withdrew before the consecration. Roy Strong writes that Carew sang the mass without elevation, but that Elizabeth did not receive Communion, citing her reported conversation with the French ambassador in 1571 that 'she had been crowned and anointed according to the ceremonies of the Catholic church, and by Catholic bishops without, however, attending mass'. Finally, the queen left the abbey, smiling and exchanging greetings with the crowd, which Il Schifanoya thought 'exceeded the bounds of gravity and decorum'.

== The coronation feast ==
Again, Il Schifanoya provides the most detailed description. Westminster Hall had been decorated by the hanging of two enormous tapestries which had been bought by Henry VIII, representing the Book of Genesis and the Acts of the Apostles; while on a raised platform was a buffet on which were displayed an array of 140 gold and silver cups. He describes how the 200 guests were seated at four large tables, each divided along the centre to allow the red-caped servants to serve the food. The organisers of the feast, the Duke of Norfolk (the Earl Marshal) and the Earl of Arundel (the Lord Steward), rode around the hall mounted on horseback. The feast began at 3 o'clock when the queen washed her hands. The highlight of the feast was the entry of the Queen's Champion, 'a country gentleman whose family has long been privileged to do this at all Coronations', actually Sir Edward Dymoke, mounted and in a full suit of armour, who issued the traditional challenges, each time throwing down his gauntlet. The feast ended at 9 o'clock in the evening, when the queen left for Whitehall. A joust organised for the next day had to be postponed as the queen was 'feeling rather tired'.

== Historical significance ==
According to Roy Strong, Elizabeth's coronation and royal entry has attracted more scholarly attention than any other. In the following centuries, historians from Raphael Holinshed onwards drew heavily on the tone of Mulcaster's The Quenes makesties pasage and presented the 1559 coronation and pageants as a turning point against imposed Catholicism and the triumph of popular Protestantism. Modern historians have taken a more critical view, asserting that the events of January 1559 were carefully stage-managed by Elizabeth and her advisers. Even the obscurity of the events surrounding the Coronation Mass has been interpreted as a signal that the future religious policy of the regime had yet to be fully determined.
