= Succession to the Crown Act 1534 =

Act of the Parliament of England

- Act of Parliament
- Parliament of England
- Long title: An Act ratifying the Oath that every of the King's Subjects hath taken, and shall hereafter be bound to take, for due Observation of the Act made for the Surety of the Succession of the King's Highness in the Crown of the Realm.
- Citation: 26 Hen. 8. c. 2
- Territorial extent: England and Wales

Dates
- Royal assent: 18 December 1534
- Commencement: 3 November 1534 (Note: Start of session.)
- Repealed: 8 June 1536
Other legislation
Repealed by	Succession to the Crown Act 1536
Relates to	Succession to the Crown Act 1533; Succession to the Crown Act 1543

Status: Repealed

Text of statute as originally enacted

The Succession to the Crown Act 1534 (26 Hen. 8. c. 2) was an act of the Parliament of England in November 1534, and required all subjects to take an oath to uphold the Act of Succession passed that March.

== Provisions ==
The act required all those asked to take the oath to recognise Anne Boleyn as King Henry VIII's lawful wife and their children legitimate heirs to the throne. Anyone refusing to take the oath was guilty of treason.

The Oath of Succession itself went further than the original Act in several ways. It demanded that persons swearing the oath renounce the power of any "foreign authority or potentate" and repudiate any oath previously made to such an authority. This discrepancy did not go unnoticed by Sir Thomas More who claimed he had been sent to the Tower "for refusing of this oath not agreeable with the statute". He thought that Thomas Cromwell and Thomas Audley "did of their own heads add more words unto it" and therefore they were unable "by their own law ... to justify my imprisonment".

Refusal to take the oath led to the arrests of Sir Thomas More, Bishop John Fisher and John Houghton, O.Cart. under the Treasons Act 1534. They refused to take the oath because it included the abjuration of the pope and claimed the marriage between King Henry VIII and Catherine of Aragon was annulled and it went against their Catholic beliefs. More, Fisher and Houghton were beheaded in 1535.

== See also ==
- Succession to the British throne
- Alternative successions of the English and British crown
