= Merchants of the Steelyard =

London merchants of the Hanseatic League

Merchants of the Steelyard Act 1534
- Act of Parliament
- Parliament of England
- Long title: A Provysyon for the Marchauntes of the Stylyard in London.
- Citation: 26 Hen. 8 c. 26
- Territorial extent: England and Wales

Dates
- Royal assent: 18 December 1534
- Commencement: 3 November 1534 (Note: Start of session.)
- Repealed: 30 July 1948

Other legislation
- Repealed by: Statute Law Revision Act 1948

Status: Repealed

Text of statute as originally enacted

The Merchants of the Steelyard was the English name for the merchants of the Hanseatic League who first settled in London in 1250 at the Steelyard on the river-side, near Cosin Lane, now Ironbridge Wharf and established their London Kontor in 1320. Located just west of London Bridge near Upper Thames Street. Cannon Street station occupies the site now. It grew significantly over time into a walled community with its own warehouses, weighhouse, church, offices and houses, reflecting the importance and scale of the activity carried on. It is first referred to as the Steelyard (der Stahlhof) in 1422.

The land and buildings still remained the property of the Hanseatic League, and were subsequently let to merchants for business purposes. Destroyed in the Great Fire of 1666 they were rebuilt as warehouses, and were finally sold to the South-Eastern Railway Company in 1852 by the Hanseatic towns, Lübeck, Bremen, and Hamburg.
