= List of acts of the Parliament of England from 1534 =

This is a list of acts of the Parliament of England for the year 1534.

For acts passed during the period 1707–1800, see the list of acts of the Parliament of Great Britain. See also the list of acts of the Parliament of Scotland, and the list of acts of the Parliament of Ireland.

For acts passed from 1801 onwards, see the list of acts of the Parliament of the United Kingdom. For acts of the devolved parliaments and assemblies in the United Kingdom, see the list of acts of the Scottish Parliament, the list of acts of the Northern Ireland Assembly, and the list of acts and measures of Senedd Cymru; see also the list of acts of the Parliament of Northern Ireland.

For medieval statutes, etc. that are not considered to be acts of Parliament, see the list of English statutes.

See also the List of ordinances and acts of the Parliament of England, 1642–1660 for ordinances and acts passed by the Long Parliament and other bodies without royal assent, and which were not considered to be valid legislation following the Restoration in 1660.

The number shown after each act's title is its chapter number. Acts are cited using this number, preceded by the years of the reign during which the relevant parliamentary session was held; thus the Union with Ireland Act 1800 is cited as "39 & 40 Geo. 3. c. 67", meaning the 67th act passed during the session that started in the 39th year of the reign of George III and which finished in the 40th year of that reign. The modern convention is to use Arabic numerals in citations (thus "41 Geo. 3" rather than "41 Geo. III"). Acts of the last session of the Parliament of Great Britain and the first session of the Parliament of the United Kingdom are both cited as "41 Geo. 3".

Acts passed by the Parliament of England did not have a short title; however, some of these acts have subsequently been given a short title by acts of the Parliament of the United Kingdom, such as the Short Titles Act 1896 (59 & 60 Vict. c. 14).

Acts passed by the Parliament of England were deemed to have come into effect on the first day of the session in which they were passed. Because of this, the years given in the list below may in fact be the year before a particular act was passed.

== 26 Hen. 8 ==
The sixth session of the 5th Parliament of King Henry VIII (the Reformation Parliament), which met at Westminster from 3 November 1534 until 18 December 1534.

This session was also traditionally cited as 26 H. 8.

Note that c. 19 was not included in traditional collection of acts, and that cc. 20–26 were traditionally cited as private acts cc. 1–7.

Short title	Citation	Royal assent
Long title
Act of Supremacy 1534 or the Supremacy of the Crown Act 1534 (repealed)	26 Hen. 8. c. 1	18 December 1534
An Act concerning the King's Highness to be Supreme Head of the Church of England, and to have Authority to reform and redress all Errors, Heresies and Abuses in the same. (Repealed by See of Rome Act 1554 (1 & 2 Ph. & M. c. 8) and Act of Supremacy 1558 (1 Eliz. 1. c. 1)))
Succession to the Crown Act 1534 (repealed)	26 Hen. 8. c. 2	18 December 1534
An Act ratifying the Oath that every of the King's Subjects hath taken, and shall hereafter be bound to take, for due Observation of the Act (Note: Succession to the Crown Act 1533 (25 Hen. 8. c. 22)) made for the Surety of the Succession of the King's Highness in the Crown of the Realm. (Repealed by Succession to the Crown Act 1536 (28 Hen. 8. c. 7))
First Fruits and Tenths Act 1534 (repealed)	26 Hen. 8. c. 3	18 December 1534
An Act concerning the Payments of First-fruits of all Dignities, Benefices and Promotions Spiritual; and also concerning one annual Pension of the tenth Part of all the Possessions of the Church, Spiritual and Temporal, granted to the King's Highness and his Heirs. (Repealed for England and Wales by First Fruits and Tenths Measure 1926 (16 & 17 Geo. 5. No. 5) and for the Isle of Man by Statute Law Revision (Isle of Man) Act 1991 (c. 61))
Jurors in Wales Act 1534 (repealed)	26 Hen. 8. c. 4	18 December 1534
An Act for Punishment of Perjury of Jurors in the Lordships Marchers in Walts. (Repealed by Statute Law Revision Act 1863 (26 & 27 Vict. c. 125))
Ferries on the Severn Act 1534 (repealed)	26 Hen. 8. c. 5	18 December 1534
An Act that Keepers of Ferries on the Water of Severn shall not convey in their Ferry-boats any manner of Person, Goods or Chattels, after the Sun going down till the Sun be up. (Repealed by Repeal of Obsolete Statutes Act 1856 (19 & 20 Vict. c. 64))
Marches in Wales Act 1534 (repealed)	26 Hen. 8. c. 6	18 December 1534
An Act that Murthers and Felonies done or committed within any Lordship Marcher in Wales, shall be inquired of at the Sessions holden within the Shire Grounds next adjoining; with many goods Orders for Ministration of Justice there to be had. (Repealed by Repeal of Obsolete Statutes Act 1856 (19 & 20 Vict. c. 64))
Sussex Highway (Diversion) Act 1534 (repealed)	26 Hen. 8. c. 7	18 December 1534
An Act for amending of Highways in Sussex. (Repealed by Statute Law Revision Act 1948 (11 & 12 Geo. 6. c. 62))
Rebuilding at Norwich (After the Fire) Act 1534 (repealed)	26 Hen. 8. c. 8	18 December 1534
An Act for the Re-edifying of void Grounds in the City of Norwich. (Repealed by Statute Law (Repeals) Act 1993 (c. 50))
Rebuilding at Lynn Bishop, Norfolk Act 1534 (repealed)	26 Hen. 8. c. 9	18 December 1534
An Act for the Re-edifying of void Grounds within the Town of Lynne. (Repealed by Statute Law (Repeals) Act 1993 (c. 50))
Importation, etc. Act 1534 (repealed)	26 Hen. 8. c. 10	18 December 1534
An Act whereby the King's Highness hath Authority to repeal the Statute made for Restraint of Wines to come in afore Candlemas. (Repealed by Statute Law Revision Act 1863 (26 & 27 Vict. c. 125))
Assaults by Welshmen Act 1534 (repealed)	26 Hen. 8. c. 11	18 December 1534
An Act for Punishment of Welshmen attempting any Assaults or Affrays upon any the Inhabitants of Hereford, Gloucester and Shropshire. (Repealed by Statute Law Revision Act 1863 (26 & 27 Vict. c. 125))
Purgation of Convicts in Wales Act 1534 (repealed)	26 Hen. 8. c. 12	18 December 1534
An Act for Purgation of Convicts in Wales. (Repealed by Statute Law Revision Act 1863 (26 & 27 Vict. c. 125))
Treasons Act 1534 or the High Treason Act 1534 (repealed)	26 Hen. 8. c. 13	18 December 1534
An Act whereby divers Offences be made High Treason. (Repealed by Statute Law Revision Act 1863 (26 & 27 Vict. c. 125))
Suffragan Bishops Act 1534	26 Hen. 8. c. 14	18 December 1534
An Act for Nomination and Consecration of Suffragans within this Realm.
Abolition of Mortuaries in Richmond, Yorkshire Act 1534 (repealed)	26 Hen. 8. c. 15	18 December 1534
An Act for taking away certain Exactions taken within the Archdeaconry of Richmond by Spiritual Men. (Repealed by Statute Law Revision Act 1948 (11 & 12 Geo. 6. c. 62))
Worsteds (Norwich, Lynn, and Yarmouth) Act 1534 (repealed)	26 Hen. 8. c. 16	18 December 1534
An Act for making of Worsteds in the City of Norwich, and in the Towns of Lyn and Yarmouth. (Repealed by Repeal of Obsolete Statutes Act 1856 (19 & 20 Vict. c. 64))
First Fruits and Tenths (No. 2) Act 1534 (repealed)	26 Hen. 8. c. 17	18 December 1534
An Act that no Farmers of Spiritual Persons shall be compelled or charged to pay for their Leaser's First Fruits, or Year's Pension of the Tenth, granted to the King's Highness. (Repealed for England and Wales by First Fruits and Tenths Measure 1926 (16 & 17 Geo. 5. No. 5) and for the Isle of Man by Statute Law Revision (Isle of Man) Act 1991 (c. 61))
Act of General Pardon 1534 (repealed)	26 Hen. 8. c. 18	18 December 1534
An Act concerning the King's general and free Pardon granted by his Highness. (Repealed by Statute Law Revision Act 1863 (26 & 27 Vict. c. 125))
Taxation Act 1534 (repealed)	26 Hen. 8. c. 19 (Note: This act was not included in The Statutes at Large.)	18 December 1534
An Act containing a Grant of Subsidy unto the King's Highness for a Fifteenth and Tenth. (Repealed by Statute Law Revision Act 1863 (26 & 27 Vict. c. 125))
Assurance of Lands to Duke of Norfolk Act 1534 (repealed)	26 Hen. 8. c. 20 (Note: This is the citation in The Statutes of the Realm.); 26 Hen. 8. c. 1 Pr. (Note: This is the citation in The Statutes at Large.)	18 December 1534
An Act for the assurance of certain lands to Thomas duke of Norfolk and others. (Repealed by Statute Law (Repeals) Act 1978 (c. 45))
Assurance of Lands to Duke of Richmond Act 1534 (repealed)	26 Hen. 8. c. 21; 26 Hen. 8. c. 2 Pr.	18 December 1534
An Act concerning the assurance of certain lands to the duke of Richmond and his heirs. (Repealed by Statute Law (Repeals) Act 1978 (c. 45))
Attainder of the Bishop of Rochester and others Act 1534 (repealed)	26 Hen. 8. c. 22; 26 Hen. 8. c. 3 Pr.	18 December 1534
An Acte concerning the Attaynder of the Bysshop of Rochester and others. (Repealed by Statute Law (Repeals) Act 1977 (c. 18))
Attainder of Sir Thomas More Act 1534 (repealed)	26 Hen. 8. c. 23; 26 Hen. 8. c. 4 Pr.	18 December 1534
An Acte concernyng the Attaynder of Syr Thomas More Knyght. (Repealed by Statute Law (Repeals) Act 1977 (c. 18))
Exchange between the King and Abbot of Waltham Act 1534 (repealed)	26 Hen. 8. c. 24; 26 Hen. 8. c. 5 Pr.	18 December 1534
An Act of Exchange between the King and the Abbot of Waltham. (Repealed by Statute Law (Repeals) Act 1978 (c. 45))
Attainder of the Earl of Kildare Act 1534 (repealed)	26 Hen. 8. c. 25; 26 Hen. 8. c. 6 Pr.	18 December 1534
An Acte concernyng the Attaynder of Thomas Fittzgerald Erle of Gildare. (Repealed by Statute Law (Repeals) Act 1977 (c. 18))
Merchants of the Steelyard Act 1534 (repealed)	26 Hen. 8. c. 26; 26 Hen. 8. c. 7 Pr.	18 December 1534
A Provysyon for the Marchauntes of the Stylyard in London. (Repealed by Statute Law Revision Act 1948 (11 & 12 Geo. 6. c. 62))

=== Sources ===
- "26° Hen. VIII". The Statutes of the Realm. Vol. 3: 1509 to 1547. pp. 492–530 – via HathiTrust.
- "Anno vicesimo sexto Henrici VIII". The Statutes at Large. Vol. 4 – 1 Richard III to 31 Henry VIII – 1483-4 to 1539. pp. 312–348 – via Internet Archive.
- "Anno vicesimo sexto Henrici VIII". The Statutes at Large. Vol. 4 – 1 Richard III to 31 Henry VIII – 1483-4 to 1539. pp. 312–348 – via Internet Archive.
- "Anno vicesimo sexto Henrici VIII". The Statutes at Large. Vol. 4 – 1 Richard III to 31 Henry VIII – 1483-4 to 1539. pp. 312–348 – via Internet Archive.
- Journal of the House of Lords. Vol. 1: 1509-1577. London: His Majesty's Stationery Office. 1830 – via British History Online.
- Chronological Table of and Index to the Statutes. Vol. 1: To the End of the Session 59 Vict. Sess. 2 (1895) (13th ed.). London: Her Majesty's Stationery Office. 1896. p. 48 – via Google Books.
- Chronological Table of the Statutes: Covering the Period from 1235 to the End of 1971. London: Her Majesty's Stationery Office. 1972. p. 44. ISBN 978-0-11-840096-1 – via Google Books.
- "Acts of the English Parliament from 1534". legislation.gov.uk. The National Archives.

== See also ==
- List of acts of the Parliament of England
