= Third Succession Act =

Act of the Parliament of England

Succession to the Crown Act 1543
- Act of Parliament
- Parliament of England
- Long title: An Act concerning the establishment of the King's Majesty's Succession in the Imperial Crown of the Realm.
- Citation: 35 Hen. 8. c. 1
- Territorial extent: England and Wales

Dates
- Royal assent: 29 March 1544
- Commencement: 14 January 1544 [O.S. 1543] (Note: Start of session)
- Repealed: 30 July 1948

Other legislation
- Repealed by: See of Rome Act 1554; Act of Supremacy 1558; Statute Law Revision Act 1863; Statute Law Revision Act 1948
- Relates to: First Succession Act; Act Respecting the Oath to the Succession; Second Succession Act; Treason Act 1547

Status: Repealed

Text of statute as originally enacted

The Third Succession Act (35 Hen. 8. c. 1) was an act passed by the Parliament of England during King Henry VIII's reign that returned his daughters Mary and Elizabeth to the line of the succession behind their half-brother Edward. Born in 1537, Edward was the son of Henry VIII and his third wife, Jane Seymour, and heir apparent to the throne.

== History ==
=== Title and dating ===
The act didn’t have a title in the modern sense. It is formally cited as 35 Hen. 8 c. 1 (meaning the first act passed in the parliamentary session beginning in the 35th year of Henry VIII's reign), and referred to by historians as the Succession to the Crown Act 1543 or the Act of Succession 1543. Royal assent was given to this bill in the spring of 1544 at the conclusion of the 1544 parliament, but until 1793 acts were dated to the beginning of the session of Parliament in which they were passed, in this case in January 1544; prior to 1750 the change of the legal year in Great Britain was on 25 March, as such the act is also often dated 1544. Henry VIII used statutes to make the adjustments to the succession that his complicated matrimonial history necessitated. The first Act (25 Hen. 8 c. 22) declared Mary illegitimate as a consequence of the annulment of his marriage to Catherine of Aragon. The second (28 Hen. 8 c. 7) after Anne Boleyn's execution declared both Mary and Elizabeth illegitimate and vested the succession in any future offspring of Henry's new wife, Jane Seymour.

=== Relationship to the First and Second Succession Acts ===
The Third Succession Act superseded the First Succession Act (1533) and the Second Succession Act (1536), whose effects had been to declare Henry's daughters Mary and Elizabeth illegitimate, and to remove them from succession to the throne. This new act returned both Mary and Elizabeth to the line of succession behind Edward, any potential children of Edward, and any potential children of Henry by his then wife, Catherine Parr, or any future wife Henry might have.

With the 1536 act, Henry VIII was authorised to dispose of the Crown by letters patent or by will, in default of any legitimate heirs after Mary and Elizabeth. Mary and Elizabeth, who had both been declared illegitimate and incapable to inherit, weren’t restored to legitimacy in the 1543/44 Act; they were only restored to succession of the Crown (with several provisos stipulated in his will of 1547, such as they could not marry without the Privy Council's approval). This meant that the place in the succession of Mary and Elizabeth remained doubtful.

=== Historical effect ===
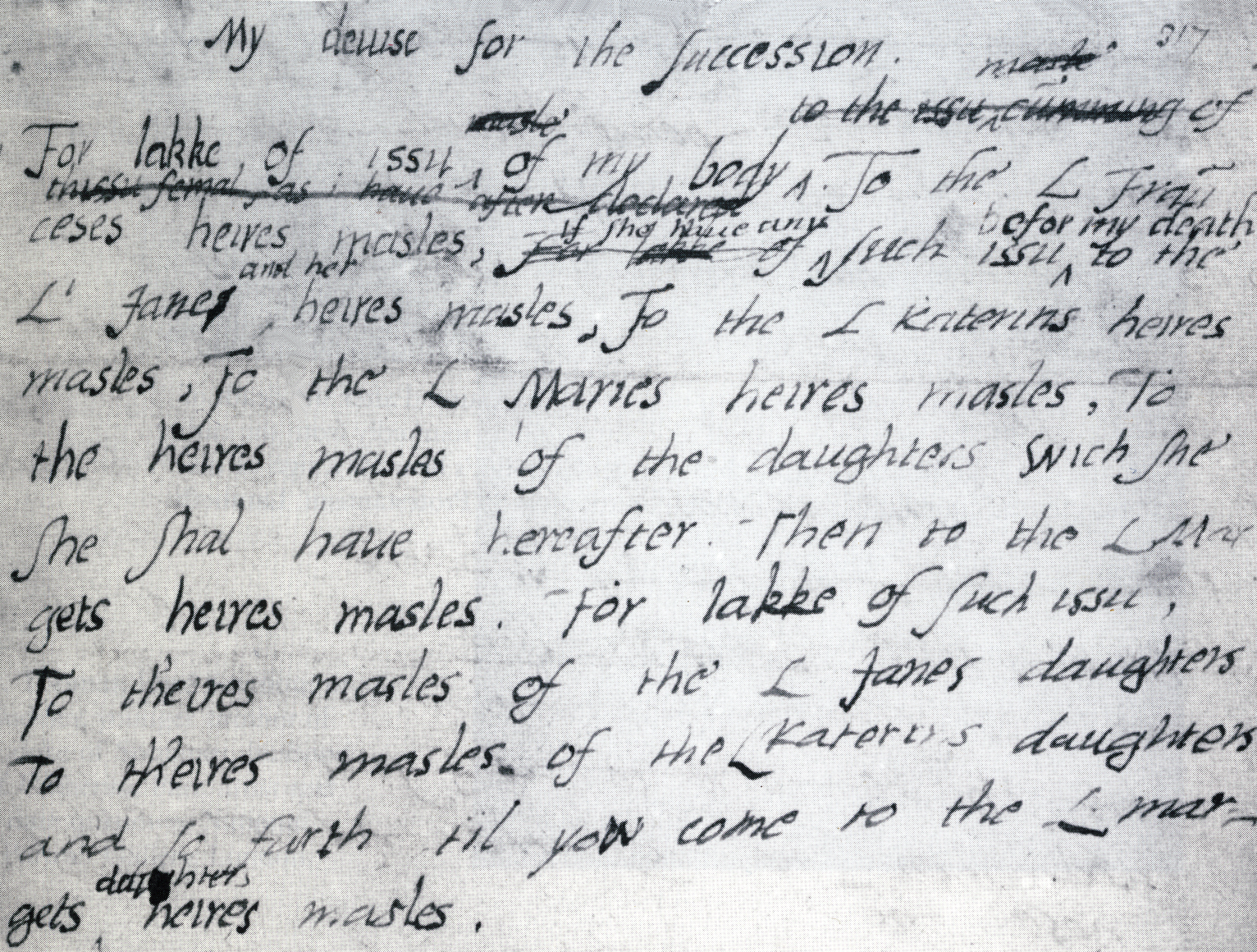
Edward VI's "Devise for the Succession"

The Treason Act 1547 (1 Edw. 6. c. 12) made it high treason to interrupt the line of succession to the throne established by the Act of Succession. Edward VI meant to bypass this act in his "Devise for the Succession", issued as letters patent on 21 June 1553, in which he named Lady Jane Grey as his successor. Prevailing over Lady Jane Grey, Mary ascended the throne under the terms of the Third Succession Act.

== Subsequent developments ==
According to Chronological table of the Statutes, 1235–2001 "Succession to the Crown Act":

- s. 7 was repealed by the See of Rome Act 1554 (1 & 2 Ph. & M. c. 8 s. 5 [s. 21, Ruff]); repeal of s. 7 was confirmed by the Act of Supremacy 1558 (1 Eliz. 1 c. 1 s. 4 [s. 13, Ruff]);

Sections 9–11 of the act were repealed by section 1 of, and the schedule to, the Statute Law Revision Act 1863 (26 & 27 Vict. c. 125), which came into force on 28 July 1863.

The entire act, so far as unrepealed, was repealed by section 1 of, and the first schedule to, the Statute Law Revision Act 1948 (11 & 12 Geo. 6. c. 62), which came into force on 30 July 1948.

== See also ==
- Will of Henry VIII of England
- Succession to the British throne
- Alternative successions of the English and British crown
