= Second Succession Act =

Act of the Parliament of England

Succession to the Crown Act 1536
- Act of Parliament
- Parliament of England
- Long title: An Act for the Establishment of the Succession of the Imperial Crown of this Realm.
- Citation: 28 Hen. 8. c. 7
- Territorial extent: England and Wales

Dates
- Royal assent: 18 July 1536
- Commencement: 8 June 1536 (Note: Start of session.)
- Repealed: 30 July 1948

Other legislation
- Repeals/revokes: Succession to the Crown Act 1533; Succession to the Crown Act 1534
- Repealed by: Legitimacy of the Queen, etc. Act 1553; See of Rome Act 1554; Act of Supremacy 1558; Statute Law Revision Act 1948
- Relates to: Succession to the Crown Act 1543

Status: Repealed

Text of statute as originally enacted

The Second Succession Act or the Succession to the Crown Act 1536 (28 Hen. 8. c. 7) was an act of the Parliament of England passed in June 1536, during the reign of Henry VIII.

== Provisions ==
The Second Succession Act was formally titled An Act concerning the Succession of the Crown, and was also known as the Succession to the Crown (Marriage) Act 1536 (28 Hen. 8. c. 7). The act followed the conviction and execution of Anne Boleyn, and removed both her daughter, Elizabeth I, and Mary I, Henry's daughter by his first wife, from the line of succession. It superseded the First Succession Act, which had declared Mary to be illegitimate and Elizabeth to be heir presumptive. This new act declared that Elizabeth was also a bastard. As a result, Henry was left without any legitimate child to inherit the throne after his death, although this would change upon the birth of Edward VI in October 1537.

Because Henry had no legitimate offspring at the time of the passage of the act, the act gave Henry "full and plenary power and authority" to choose who would succeed him if he died without an heir of his body, by naming his successor in letters patent or in his last will.

The act also created several offences of high treason connected with interrupting the succession to the throne of any person so chosen, or with saying that Henry's first two marriages to Catherine of Aragon and Anne Boleyn had been valid, or that his third marriage to Jane Seymour was invalid, or with saying either of his daughters were legitimate and any son of his third marriage was not.

The act also required some of Henry's subjects to take an oath to uphold the act, and made it treason to refuse to take said oath. Sanctuary was not available for people accused of treason under the act, and – in addition to the death penalty – anyone convicted of treason by interrupting the succession to the throne was to forfeit their own claim to the throne, if any existed.

The act also made it treason to criticise the death sentence passed against Thomas More under the Treasons Act 1534 (26 Hen. 8. c. 13).

Finally, the act made it treason to attempt to repeal the act. It was superseded in 1543 by the Third Succession Act, which returned Henry's daughters into the line of succession to the throne, but did not restore their legitimacy.

== Subsequent developments ==
The whole act, so far as unrepealed, was repealed by section 1 of, and the first schedule to, the Statute Law Revision Act 1948 (11 & 12 Geo. 6. c. 62), which came into force on 30 July 1948.

== See also ==
- Succession to the British throne
- Alternative successions of the English and British crown
