= First Succession Act =

Act of the Parliament of England

Succession to the Crown Act 1533
- Act of Parliament
- Parliament of England
- Long title: An Act declaring the Establishment of Succession of the King's most Royal Majesty in the Imperial Crown of this Realm.
- Citation: 25 Hen. 8. c. 22
- Territorial extent: England and Wales

Dates
- Royal assent: 30 March 1534
- Commencement: 15 January 1534 (Note: Start of session.)
- Repealed: 8 June 1536
Other legislation
Repealed by	Succession to the Crown Act 1536; Legitimacy of the Queen, etc. Act 1553
Relates to	Succession to the Crown Act 1534; Treasons Act 1534

Status: Repealed

Text of statute as originally enacted

The First Succession Act (25 Hen. 8. c. 22) of Henry VIII's reign was an act of the Parliament of England passed in March 1534. The act was formally titled the Succession to the Crown Act 1533, or the Act of Succession 1533; it is often dated as 1534, as it was passed in that calendar year. However, the legal calendar in use at that time dated the beginning of the year as March 25, and so considered the act as being in 1533.

== Provisions ==
The act made Elizabeth, daughter of Henry VIII by Anne Boleyn, who had been born on 7 September 1533, the heir presumptive to the Crown by declaring Mary, daughter of Henry VIII by Catherine of Aragon, a bastard. The act also required all subjects, if commanded, to swear an oath to recognise the act as well as the king's supremacy. Under the Treasons Act 1534 (26 Hen. 8. c. 13) anyone who refused to take the oath was subject to a charge of treason.

The act was later altered by the Second Succession Act, which made Elizabeth illegitimate, and the Third Succession Act, which returned both Mary and Elizabeth to the line of succession.

== See also ==
- Succession to the British throne
- Alternative successions of the English and British crown

== Bibliography ==
- Cannon, John Ashton. The Oxford Companion to British History. 1st ed. Oxford [England: Oxford UP, 1997. Print.
- Gardiner, Juliet, and Neil Wenborn. The Columbia Companion to British History. New York: Columbia UP, 1997. Print.
- Haigh, Christopher. English Reformations: Religion, Politics, and Society under the Tudors. 1st ed. Oxford: Clarendon, 1993. Print.
- Loades, David. Henry VIII Court, Church and Conflict. National Archives, 2007. Print.
- Ridley, Jasper Godwin. Henry VIII. New York, NY: Viking Penguin, 1985. Print.
- Lee, Sidney, ed. (1894). "More, Thomas (1478-1535)". Dictionary of National Biography. Vol. 38. London: Smith, Elder & Co. pp. 437–8.
- Viorst, Milton. The Great Documents of Western Civilization. Philadelphia: Chilton, 1965. Print.
