= 1542 =

1542 in various calendars
- Gregorian calendar: 1542; MDXLII
- Ab urbe condita: 2295
- Armenian calendar: 991; ԹՎ ՋՂԱ
- Assyrian calendar: 6292
- Balinese saka calendar: 1463–1464
- Bengali calendar: 948–949
- Berber calendar: 2492
- English Regnal year: 33 Hen. 8 – 34 Hen. 8
- Buddhist calendar: 2086
- Burmese calendar: 904
- Byzantine calendar: 7050–7051
- Chinese calendar: 辛丑年 (Metal Ox); 4239 or 4032 — to — 壬寅年 (Water Tiger); 4240 or 4033
- Coptic calendar: 1258–1259
- Discordian calendar: 2708
- Ethiopian calendar: 1534–1535
- Hebrew calendar: 5302–5303
- Hindu calendars
- Vikram Samvat: 1598–1599
- Shaka Samvat: 1463–1464
- Kali Yuga: 4642–4643
- Holocene calendar: 11542
- Igbo calendar: 542–543
- Iranian calendar: 920–921
- Islamic calendar: 948–949
- Japanese calendar: Tenbun 11 (天文１１年)
- Javanese calendar: 1460–1461
- Julian calendar: 1542; MDXLII
- Korean calendar: 3875
- Minguo calendar: 370 before ROC 民前370年
- Nanakshahi calendar: 74
- Thai solar calendar: 2084–2085
- Tibetan calendar: ལྕགས་མོ་གླང་ལོ་ (female Iron-Ox); 1668 or 1287 or 515 — to — ཆུ་ཕོ་སྟག་ལོ་ (male Water-Tiger); 1669 or 1288 or 516

September 28 – Juan Rodríguez Cabrillo claims California for the Spanish Empire.

Year 1542 (MDXLII) was a common year starting on Sunday of the Julian calendar.

== Events ==
=== January–March ===
- January 6 – In the Yucatan peninsula in Mexico, the Spanish colonists create the new town of Mérida.
- January 16 – The 8th Parliament of Henry VIII assembles at Westminster after having been summoned on November 23.
- January 20 – The first legislature for the Voivode of Transylvania meets at Vásárhely in the Kingdom of Hungary (now Târgu Mureș in Romania).
- January 23 – Tutul-Xiu, the Mayan ruler of the Maní in Yucatán, arrives at the Spanish settlement of Merida with food supplies for the colonists and offers to assist the Spaniards in their conquest of Yucatan in return for being installed as the leading Mayan ruler in Mexico.
- February 2 – Battle of Baçente: The Portuguese under Cristóvão da Gama capture a Muslim-occupied hillfort in northern Ethiopia.
- February 13 – Catherine Howard, until recently the Queen consort of England and the wife of King Henry VIII, is executed by beheading, two days after the King gives royal assent to a bill of attainder passed by the English Parliament on February 7. Catherine had been arrested in November on accusations that she had sexual relations with Thomas Culpeper.
- February 14 – Guadalajara, Mexico, is founded by the Spaniards after three previous attempts failed, due to aggressive opposition from local tribes.
- February 15 – Antoine Escalin des Aimars of France completes the negotiation with the Ottoman Sultan Suleiman for the Franco-Ottoman alliance.
- March 8 – Antoine Escalin des Eymars, the French ambassador, returns from Constantinople, with promises of Ottoman aid in a war against Charles V, Holy Roman Emperor.

=== April–June ===
- April 1 – As the 1542 session of the English Parliament ends, King Henry VIII gives royal assent to numerous laws, including the Witchcraft Act, the Treason Act, and the Leases by Corporations Act.
- April 4 – The Battle of Jarte begins in Ethiopia as the Army of the Portuguese Empire, commanded by Cristóvão da Gama encounters the army of the Ethiopian ruler, the Imam Ahmad ibn Ibrahim al-Ghazi, achieving a victory on April 16.
- May 19 – The Prome Kingdom, in modern-day central Burma, is conquered by the Taungoo Dynasty.
- June 18 – The Parliament of Ireland passes the Crown of Ireland Act, which dissolves the title of Lord of Ireland and reestablishes it to the Kingdom of Ireland, with its last Lord, Henry VIII of England, becoming its first king.
- June 27 – Juan Rodriguez Cabrillo sets sail to explore the northwest of the Pacific Ocean.

=== July–September ===
- July 21 – Pope Paul III establishes the Holy Office with the bull Licet ab initio, with jurisdiction over the Roman Inquisition.
- July 23 – (10th day of 6th month of Tenbun 11) In Japan, a six-year rebellion within the Date clan when clan leader Date Tanemune, returning home from a day of falconry, is attacked by his oldest son, Date Harumune, and imprisoned at Kōri-Nishiyama Castle in Fukushima Prefecture. Tanemune is rescued by an aide, Koyanagigawa Munetomo, and escapes. The war lasts for six years before Harumune triumphs and becomes the new leader of the Date clan.
- July 24 – Guelders Wars: Maarten van Rossum leaves Antwerp, having failed to take it by siege.
- August 24 – Battle of Haddon Rig: Scotland defeats England.
- August 27 – Citizens of Hildesheim in the Holy Roman Empire profess themselves to the Lutheran teachings, thus joining the Schmalkaldic League. As a pledge owner, the city provides for the carrying out of the Protestant Reformation in the city and Peine. Priests from the localities of Clauen, Hohenhameln, Soßmar, Schmedenstedt, Lengede and Rosenthal resume their offices in the interest of the Reformation.
- August 28 – Battle of Wofla in Ethiopia: Reinforced with at least 2900 arquebusiers and cavalry, the Imam Ahmed ibn Ibrahim al-Ghazi attacks the Portuguese camp. The Portuguese are scattered; Cristóvão da Gama is captured and executed.
- September 4 – The earliest recorded Preston Guild Court is held in Lancashire, England, in the modern sequence, which lasts unbroken until 1922.
- September 28 – Juan Rodríguez Cabrillo lands in what is now San Diego Bay, and names it "San Miguel", claiming it for the Spanish Empire. San Miguel will later become the city of San Diego. This marks the first time a European sees what is now the U.S. state of California.

=== October–December ===
- October 7 – Cabrillo becomes the first European to set foot on California's Santa Catalina Island.
- November 9 – King James V of Scotland writes a letter to Pope Paul III and notes that he defied Henry VIII's attempts to convert him to the Protestant faith.
- November 24 – Battle of Solway Moss: An English army invades Scotland, and defeats a Scottish army.
- November 27 – Palace plot of Renyin year: A group of Ming dynasty palace women fail to murder the Jiajing Emperor, and are executed by slow-slicing.
- December 14 – Mary, Queen of Scots, aged six days, becomes queen regnant on the death of her father, James V of Scotland.

=== Date unknown ===
- The first contact of Japan with the West occurs when a Portuguese ship, blown off its course to China, lands Antonio Pexoto, Francisco Zeimoto and António Mota in Japan, according to António Galvão. According to the Japanese books Tanegashima Kafu and Teppoki, it is stated they landed in 1543.
- Bartolomé de las Casas completes A Short Account of the Destruction of the Indies, which will be published in 1552.

== Births ==
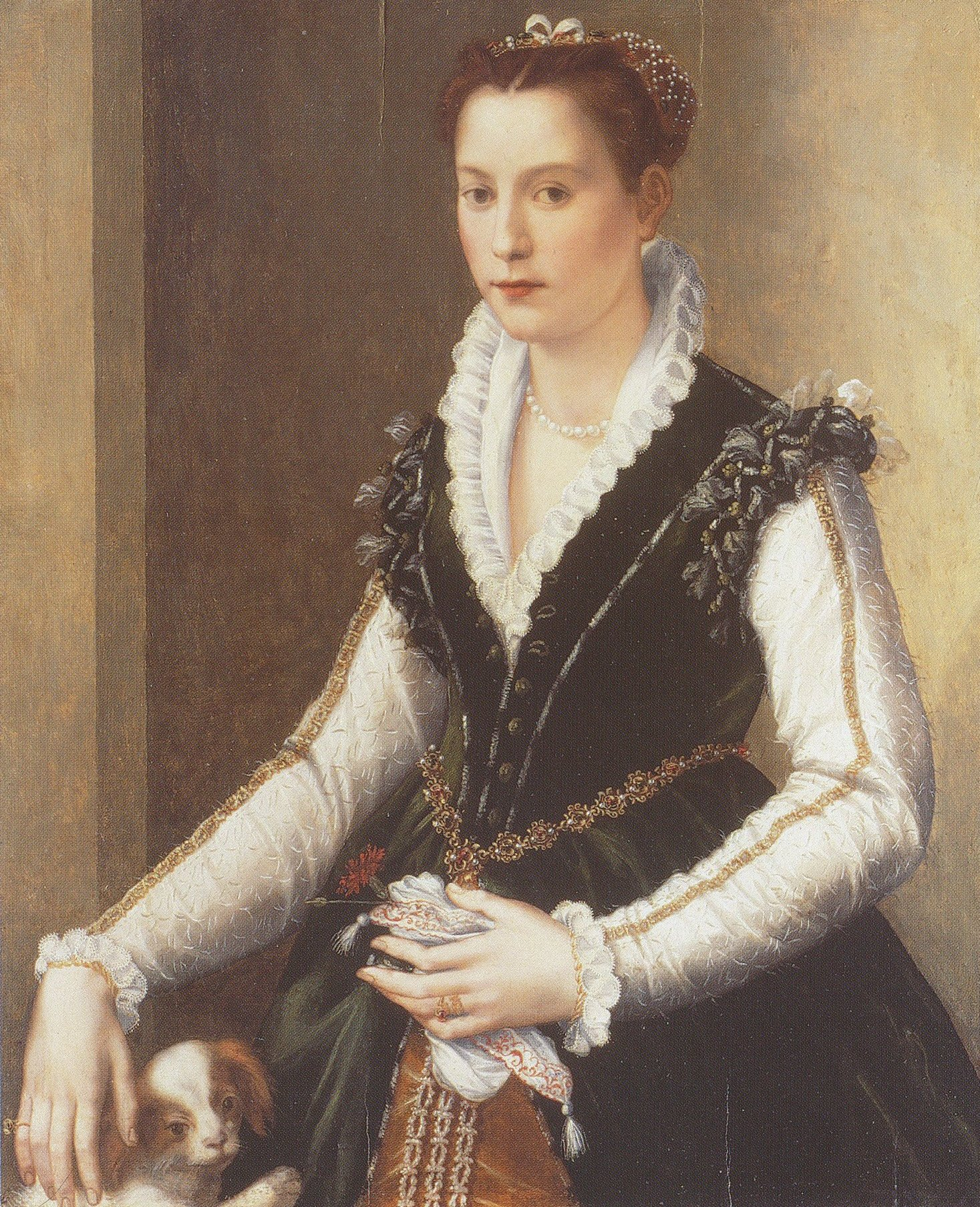
Isabella de' Medici

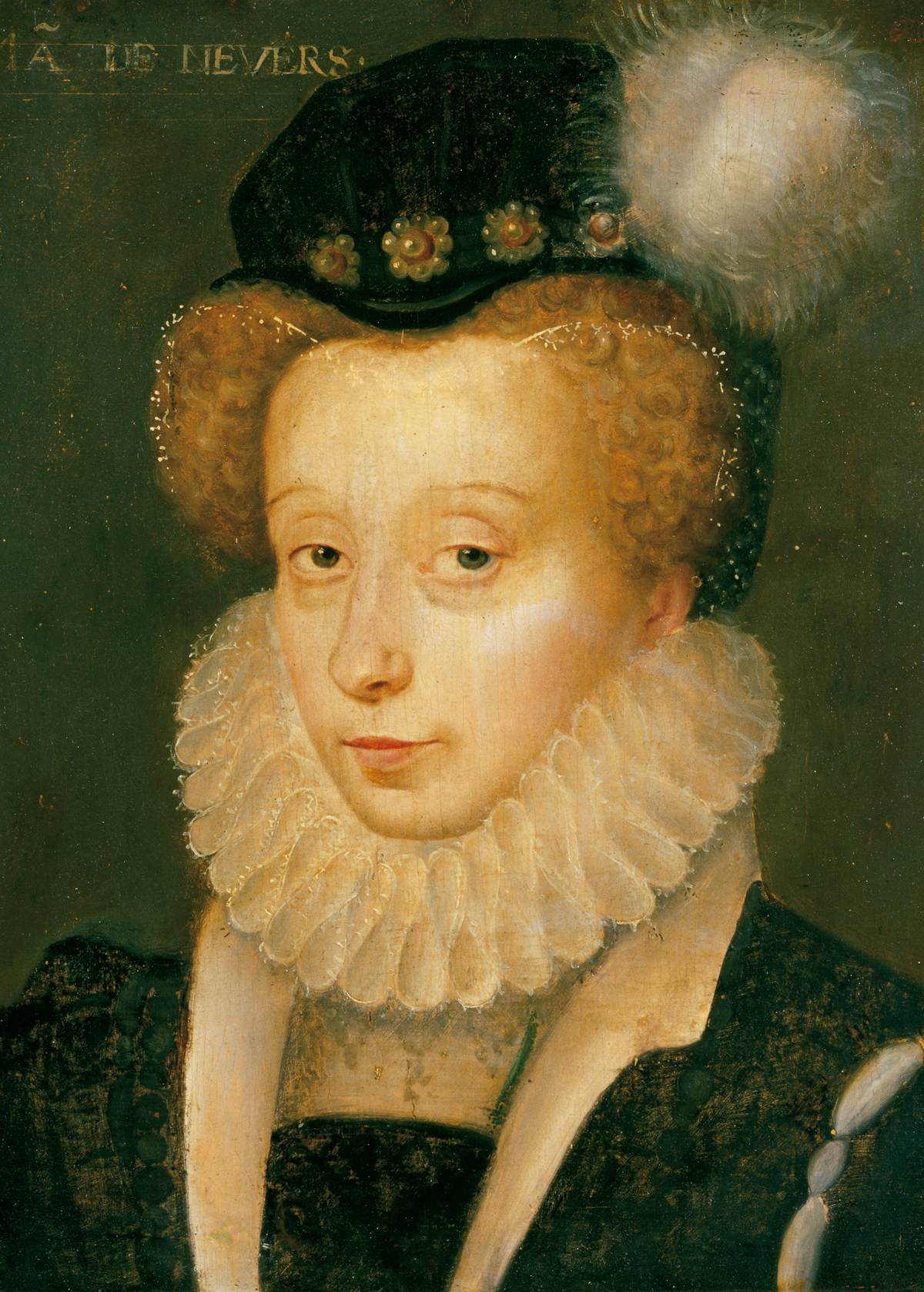
Henriette of Cleves

- February 1 – John Scudamore, English politician (d. 1623)
- February 22 – Santino Garsi da Parma, Italian musician (d. 1604)
- March 19 – Jan Zamoyski, Polish nobleman (d. 1605)
- April 29 – Henry III, Duke of Münsterberg-Oels (d. 1587)
- May 5 – Thomas Cecil, 1st Earl of Exeter, English politician (d. 1623)
- May 11 – Jakob Christoph Blarer von Wartensee, Swiss Catholic bishop (d. 1608)
- May 16 – Anna Sibylle of Hanau-Lichtenberg, German noblewoman, daughter of Count Philip IV of Hanau-Lichtenberg (d. 1580)
- June 15 – Richard Grenville, English politician (d. 1591)
- June 24 – John of the Cross, Spanish Carmelite mystic, theologian, poet (d. 1591)
- July 25 – Magnus, Duke of Östergötland, Swedish prince (d. 1595)
- Between August 18 and August 28 – Charles Neville, 6th Earl of Westmorland (d. 1601)
- August 27 – John Frederick, Duke of Pomerania and Protestant Bishop of Cammin (d. 1600)
- August 31 – Isabella de' Medici, Italian princess (d. 1576)
- September 25 – Elisabeth of Nassau-Dillenburg, sister of William the Silent (d. 1603)
- October 1 – Álvaro de Mendaña de Neira, Spanish explorer (d. 1595)
- October 4 – Robert Bellarmine, Italian saint (d. 1621)
- October 14 – Philip IV, Count of Nassau-Weilburg (d. 1602)
- October 15 – Akbar, Mughal Emperor (d. 1605)
- October 31 – Henriette of Cleves, Duchess of Nevers, Countess of Rethel (d. 1601)
- November 1 – Tarquinia Molza, Italian singer (d. 1617)
- November 9 – Anders Sørensen Vedel, Danish historian (d. 1616)
- November 11 – Scipione Gonzaga, Italian Catholic cardinal (d. 1593)
- December 8 – Mary, Queen of Scots (d. 1587)
- December 21 – Thomas Allen, English mathematician and astrologer, some suggest 1540 (d. 1632)
- date unknown
  - Joris Hoefnagel, Dutch painter and engraver (d. 1601)
  - Toda Kazuaki, Japanese samurai in the service of Tokugawa Ieyasu (d. 1604)
  - Douglas Sheffield, Baroness Sheffield, lover of Robert Dudley, 1st Earl of Leicester (d. 1608)
  - Horio Yoshiharu, Japanese daimyō (d. 1611)
  - Kuki Yoshitaka, Japanese naval commander (d. 1600)

== Deaths ==
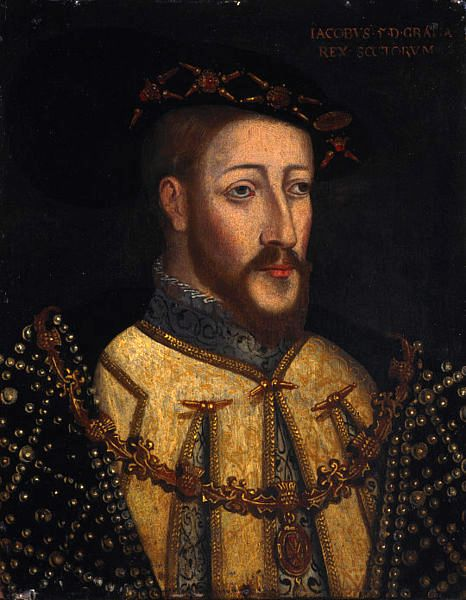
James V, King of Scotland

- January 21 – Azai Sukemasa, Japanese samurai and warlord (b. 1491)
- February – Nikolaus Federmann, German adventurer in Venezuela and Colombia (b. 1501)
- February 1 – Girolamo Aleandro, Italian cardinal (b. 1480)
- February 13
  - Catherine Howard, fifth queen of Henry VIII of England (executed) (born c. 1522)
  - Jane Boleyn, Viscountess Rochford, English noblewoman (executed) (born c. 1505)
- March 3 – Arthur Plantagenet, 1st Viscount Lisle, illegitimate son of King Edward IV of England
- May 21 – Hernando de Soto, Spanish explorer, navigator and conquistador (b. c. 1500)
- June 14 – Christoph von Scheurl, German writer (b. 1481)
- June 19 – Leo Jud, Swiss reformer (b. 1482)
- July 15 – Lisa del Giocondo, Florentine noblewoman, believed to be the subject of the Mona Lisa (b. 1479)
- August 24 – Gasparo Contarini, Italian diplomat and cardinal (b. 1483)
- August 29 – Cristóvão da Gama, Portuguese soldier (b. c. 1516)
- September 17 – Lucas Fernández, Spanish dramatist and musician (b. c. 1474)
- September 21 – Juan Boscán Almogáver, Spanish poet (b. c. 1490)
- October 11 – Thomas Wyatt, English poet and diplomat (b. 1503)
- October 18 – Giovanni Gaddi, Italian priest (b. 1493)
- December 14 – King James V of Scotland (b. 1512)
- December 16 – Thomas Lovett III, High Sheriff of Northamptonshire (b. 1473)
- date unknown
  - Dosso Dossi, Italian painter (b. 1490)
  - Lapulapu, Filipino king (b. 1491)
