= Le Roy le veult =

Phrase used in parliamentary procedure

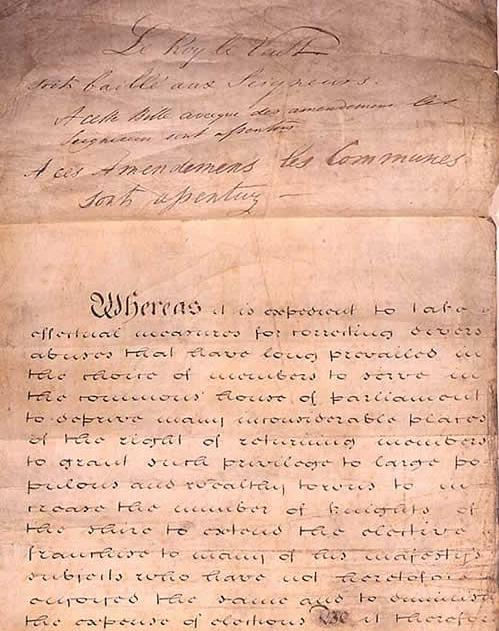
Start of the parchment roll of the Reform Act 1832, with the clerk's record of the royal assent of King William IV written above the bill, reading in full Le Roy le Veult soit baillé aux Seigneurs. A cette Bille avecque des amendemens les Seigneurs sont assentuz. A ces Amendemens les Communes sont assentuz.

Le Roy le veult (/lə ˈrɔɪ lə ˌvʌlt/, "The King wills it") or La Reyne le veult (/læ ˈreɪn lə ˌvʌlt/, "The Queen wills it") is a Norman French phrase used in the Parliament of the United Kingdom to signify that a public bill, including a private member's bill, has received royal assent from the monarch. During the Anglo-Norman rule of England, the kings were titled Roy, Roi, Rey, Rei and the Latin Rex, all meaning "King". Usage of this phrase is a legacy of the time prior to 1488 when parliamentary and judicial business was conducted in Norman, the language of the educated classes dating to the Norman Conquest of 1066. It is one of a small number of Norman phrases that continue to be used in the course of parliamentary procedure.

== Usage ==
The phrase is used to signify that the monarch has granted his or her royal assent to a bill in order to make it become law. It is used by the Clerk of the Parliaments in the House of Lords. It is only used after the Lords Commissioners have read out the letters patent for the bill. The Clerk of the Crown then reads out the short title of the bill and the Clerk of the Parliaments responds by saying the phrase towards the House of Commons at the bar of the House for each bill. The phrase is also written on the paper of the bill to show that the monarch granted royal assent to the bill.

Should royal assent be withheld, the expression Le Roy/La Reyne s'avisera, "The King/Queen will advise him/her self" (i.e., will take the bill under advisement), a paraphrase of the Law Latin euphemism Rex/Regina consideret ("The King/Queen will consider [the matter]"), would be used, though no British monarch has used this veto power since Queen Anne on the Scottish Militia Bill in 1708.

For a supply bill, an alternative phrase is used; Le Roy/La Reyne remercie ses bons sujets, accepte leur benevolence, et ainsi le veult ("The King/Queen thanks his/her good subjects, accepts their bounty, and wills it so"). For a personal bill (e.g. Handel's Naturalisation Act 1727), the phrase Soit fait comme il est désiré ("Let it be done as it is desired") is used.

== History ==
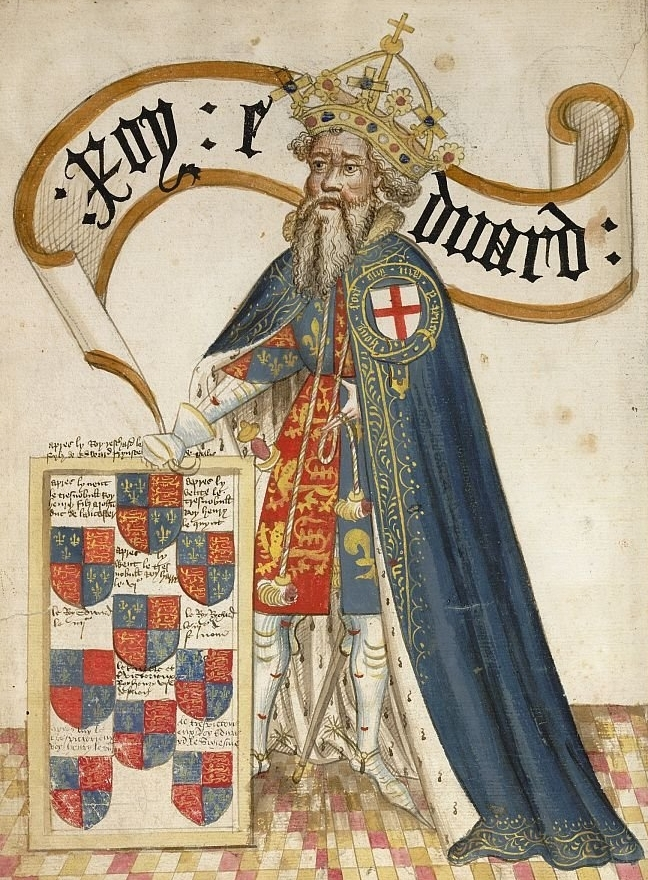
"Roy" Edward III, King of England. Bruges Garter Book.

The practice of giving royal assent originated in the early days of Parliament to signify that the king intended for something to be made law. Norman French came to be used as the standard language of the educated classes and of the law, though Latin continued to be used alongside it. The work of the Parliament of England was conducted entirely in French until the latter part of Edward III's reign (1327–1377) and English was only rarely used before the reign of Henry VI (1422–1461, 1470–1471). Royal assent was occasionally given in English, though more usually in the traditional Norman French fashion. The practice of recording parliamentary statutes in French or Latin ceased by 1488, and statutes have been published in English ever since.

The phrase Le Roy le veult was also used in the Parliament of Ireland (13th century – 1800).

During the period of the Protectorate, when the Lord Protector (Oliver Cromwell and later his son Richard Cromwell) governed the country, assent was given in English. The old practice of giving assent in Norman French was resumed following the English Restoration in 1660 and has continued ever since. There has only been one attempt to abolish it, when the House of Lords passed a bill in 1706 "for abolishing the use of the French tongue in all proceedings in Parliament and courts of justice". The bill failed to pass the House of Commons. Although the use of French in courts was abolished in 1731, Parliamentary practice was unaffected.
