= List of acts of the 1st session of the 57th Parliament of the United Kingdom =

This is a list of acts of the 1st session of the 57th Parliament of the United Kingdom, which ran from 13 June 2017 until 8 October 2019.

Acts passed since 1963 are cited by calendar year, as opposed to the convention used for earlier acts of citing the regnal year(s) in which the relevant parliamentary session was held. Each act passed in a respective year is given a chapter number (abbreviated "c."), denoted by Arabic numerals in the case of public general acts, lowercase Roman numerals in the case of local acts, or italicised Arabic numerals in the case of personal acts. These run as separate series.

71 acts of Parliament were passed by the 57th Parliament in its 1st session: 67 public general acts and 4 local acts.

indicates that an act is available to view at legislation.gov.uk, and indicates the location of the original act in the Parliamentary Archives.

== Public general acts ==
{{legislationuk|act |- | {{|Supply and Appropriation (Main Estimates) Act 2017|public|31|19-07-2017|maintained=y|An Act to authorise the use of resources for the year ending with 31 March 2018; to authorise both the issue of sums out of the Consolidated Fund and the application of income for that year; and to appropriate the supply authorised for that year by this Act and by the Supply and Appropriation (Anticipation and Adjustments) Act 2017.}} |- | {{|Finance (No. 2) Act 2017|public|32|16-11-2017|maintained=y|An Act to grant certain duties, to alter other duties, and to amend the law relating to the national debt and the public revenue, and to make further provision in connection with finance.}} |- | {{|Air Travel Organisers' Licensing Act 2017|public|33|16-11-2017|maintained=y|An Act to amend sections 71, 71A and 84 of the Civil Aviation Act 1982, and for connected purposes.}} |- | {{|Northern Ireland Budget Act 2017|public|34|16-11-2017|maintained=y|An Act to authorise the issue out of the Consolidated Fund of Northern Ireland of certain sums for the service of the year ending 31 March 2018; to appropriate those sums for specified purposes; to authorise the Department of Finance in Northern Ireland to borrow on the credit of the appropriated sums; to authorise the use for the public service of certain resources (including accruing resources) for the year ending 31 March 2018; and to repeal certain spent provisions.}} |- | {{|European Union (Approvals) Act 2017|public|35|07-12-2017|maintained=y|repealed=y|An Act to make provision approving for the purposes of section 8 of the European Union Act 2011 draft decisions under Article 352 of the Treaty on the Functioning of the European Union on the participation of the Republic of Albania and the Republic of Serbia in the work of the European Union Agency for Fundamental Rights and on the signing and conclusion of an agreement between the European Union and Canada regarding the application of their competition laws.}} |- | {{|Telecommunications Infrastructure (Relief from Non-Domestic Rates) Act 2018|public|1|08-02-2018|maintained=y|archived=n|An Act to make provision enabling relief from non-domestic rates in England and Wales to be conferred in respect of hereditaments used for the purposes of facilitating the transmission of communications by any means involving the use of electrical or electromagnetic energy; and for connected purposes.}} |- | {{|Armed Forces (Flexible Working) Act 2018|public|2|08-02-2018|maintained=y|archived=n|An Act to make provision for members of the regular forces to serve part-time or subject to geographic restrictions.}} |- | {{|Finance Act 2018|public|3|15-03-2018|maintained=y|archived=n|An Act to grant certain duties, to alter other duties, and to amend the law relating to the national debt and the public revenue, and to make further provision in connection with finance.}} |- | {{|Supply and Appropriation (Anticipation and Adjustments) Act 2018|public|4|15-03-2018|maintained=y|archived=n|An Act to authorise the use of resources for the years ending with 31 March 2017, 31 March 2018 and 31 March 2019; to authorise the issue of sums out of the Consolidated Fund for the years ending 31 March 2018 and 31 March 2019; and to appropriate the supply authorised by this Act for the years ending with 31 March 2017 and 31 March 2018.}} |- | {{|Space Industry Act 2018|public|5|15-03-2018|maintained=y|archived=n|An Act to make provision about space activities and sub-orbital activities, and for connected purposes.}} |- | {{|Northern Ireland (Regional Rates and Energy) Act 2018|public|6|28-03-2018|maintained=y|archived=n|An Act to make provision about the regional rate in Northern Ireland for the year ending 31 March 2019; and amend the Renewable Heat Incentive Scheme Regulations (Northern Ireland) 2012.}} |- | {{|Northern Ireland Assembly Members (Pay) Act 2018|public|7|28-03-2018|maintained=y|archived=n|An Act to confer power on the Secretary of State to determine salaries and other benefits for Members of the Northern Ireland Assembly in respect of periods when there is no Executive.}} |- | {{|Northern Ireland Budget (Anticipation and Adjustments) Act 2018|public|8|28-03-2018|maintained=y|archived=n|An Act to authorise the issue out of the Consolidated Fund of Northern Ireland of certain sums for the service of the years ending 31 March 2018 and 2019; to appropriate those sums for specified purposes; to authorise the use for the public service of certain resources for those years; to revise the limits on the use of certain accruing resources in the year ending 31 March 2018; and to authorise the Department of Finance in Northern Ireland to borrow on the credit of the sum appropriated for the year ending 31 March 2019.}} |- | {{|Laser Misuse (Vehicles) Act 2018|public|9|10-05-2018|maintained=y|archived=n|An Act to make provision creating new offences of shining or directing a laser beam towards a vehicle or air traffic facility; and for connected purposes.}} |- | {{|Financial Guidance and Claims Act 2018|public|10|10-05-2018|maintained=y|archived=n|An Act to make provision establishing a new financial guidance body (including provision about a debt respite scheme); to make provision about the funding of debt advice in Scotland, Wales and Northern Ireland; to provide a power to make regulations prohibiting unsolicited direct marketing in relation to pensions and other consumer financial products and services; and to make provision about the regulation of claims management services.}} |- | {{|Secure Tenancies (Victims of Domestic Abuse) Act 2018|public|11|10-05-2018|maintained=y|archived=n|An Act to make provision about the granting of old-style secure tenancies in cases of domestic abuse.}} |- | {{|Data Protection Act 2018|public|12|23-05-2018|maintained=y|archived=n|An Act to make provision for the regulation of the processing of information relating to individuals; to make provision in connection with the Information Commissioner's functions under certain regulations relating to information; to make provision for a direct marketing code of practice; and for connected purposes.}} |- | {{|Sanctions and Anti-Money Laundering Act 2018|public|13|23-05-2018|maintained=y|archived=n|An Act to make provision enabling sanctions to be imposed where appropriate for the purposes of compliance with United Nations obligations or other international obligations or for the purposes of furthering the prevention of terrorism or for the purposes of national security or international peace and security or for the purposes of furthering foreign policy objectives; to make provision for the purposes of the detection, investigation and prevention of money laundering and terrorist financing and for the purposes of implementing Standards published by the Financial Action Task Force relating to combating threats to the integrity of the international financial system; and for connected purposes.}} |- | {{|Smart Meters Act 2018|public|14|23-05-2018|maintained=y|archived=n|An Act to extend the period for the Secretary of State to exercise powers relating to smart metering; to provide for a special administration regime for a smart meter communication licensee; and to make provision enabling half-hourly electricity imbalances to be calculated using information obtained from smart meters.}} |- | {{|Nuclear Safeguards Act 2018|public|15|26-06-2018|maintained=y|archived=n|An Act to make provision about nuclear safeguards; and for connected purposes.}} |- | {{|European Union (Withdrawal) Act 2018|public|16|26-06-2018|maintained=y|archived=n|An Act to repeal the European Communities Act 1972 and make other provision in connection with the withdrawal of the United Kingdom from the EU.}} |- | {{|Supply and Appropriation (Main Estimates) Act 2018|public|17|19-07-2018|maintained=y|archived=n|An Act to authorise the use of resources for the year ending with 31 March 2019; to authorise both the issue of sums out of the Consolidated Fund and the application of income for that year; and to appropriate the supply authorised for that year by this Act and by the Supply and Appropriation (Anticipation and Adjustments) Act 2018.}} |- | {{|Automated and Electric Vehicles Act 2018|public|18|19-07-2018|maintained=y|archived=n|An Act to make provision about automated vehicles and electric vehicles.}} |- | {{|Haulage Permits and Trailer Registration Act 2018|public|19|19-07-2018|maintained=y|archived=n|An Act to make provision about the international transport of goods by road; to make provision about the registration of trailers; and for connected purposes.}} |- | {{|Northern Ireland Budget Act 2018|public|20|19-07-2018|maintained=y|archived=n|An Act to authorise the issue out of the Consolidated Fund of Northern Ireland of certain sums for the service of the year ending 31 March 2019; to appropriate those sums for specified purposes; to authorise the Department of Finance in Northern Ireland to borrow on the credit of the appropriated sums; to authorise the use for the public service of certain resources (including accruing resources) for the year ending 31 March 2019; and to repeal certain spent provisions.}} |- | {{|Domestic Gas and Electricity (Tariff Cap) Act 2018|public|21|19-07-2018|maintained=y|archived=n|An Act to make provision for the imposition of a cap on rates charged to domestic customers for the supply of gas and electricity; and for connected purposes.}} |- | {{|Taxation (Cross-border Trade) Act 2018|public|22|13-09-2018|maintained=y|archived=n|An Act to impose and regulate a duty of customs by reference to the importation of goods into the United Kingdom; to confer a power to impose and regulate a duty of customs by reference to the export of goods from the United Kingdom; to make other provision in relation to any duty of customs in connection with the withdrawal of the United Kingdom from the EU; to amend the law relating to value added tax, and the law relating to any excise duty on goods, in connection with that withdrawal; and for connected purposes.}} |- | {{|Assaults on Emergency Workers (Offences) Act 2018|public|23|13-09-2018|maintained=y|archived=n|An Act to make provision about offences when perpetrated against emergency workers, and persons assisting such workers; to make certain offences aggravated when perpetrated against such workers in the exercise of their duty; and for connected purposes.}} |- | {{|Parental Bereavement (Leave and Pay) Act 2018|public|24|13-09-2018|maintained=y|archived=n|An Act to make provision about leave and pay for employees whose children have died.}} |- | {{|Rating (Property in Common Occupation) and Council Tax (Empty Dwellings) Act 2018|public|25|01-11-2018|maintained=y|archived=n|An Act to make provision, where two or more hereditaments occupied or owned by the same person meet certain conditions as to contiguity, for those hereditaments to be treated for the purposes of non-domestic rating as one hereditament; and to increase the percentage by which a billing authority in England may increase the council tax payable in respect of a long-term empty dwelling.}} |- | {{|Non-Domestic Rating (Nursery Grounds) Act 2018|public|26|01-11-2018|maintained=y|archived=n|An Act to make provision for buildings used as nursery grounds to be exempt from non-domestic rates in England and Wales.}} |- | {{|Mental Health Units (Use of Force) Act 2018|public|27|01-11-2018|maintained=y|archived=n|An Act to make provision about the oversight and management of the appropriate use of force in relation to people in mental health units; to make provision about the use of body cameras by police officers in the course of duties in relation to people in mental health units; and for connected purposes.}} |- | {{|Northern Ireland (Executive Formation and Exercise of Functions) Act 2018|public|28|01-11-2018|maintained=y|archived=n|An Act to facilitate the formation of an Executive in Northern Ireland by extending the time for making Ministerial appointments following the election of the Northern Ireland Assembly on 2 March 2017; and to make provision about the exercise of governmental functions in, or in relation to, Northern Ireland in the absence of Northern Ireland Ministers.}} |- | {{|Civil Liability Act 2018|public|29|20-12-2018|maintained=y|archived=n|An Act to make provision about whiplash claims and the personal injury discount rate.}} |- | {{|Ivory Act 2018|public|30|20-12-2018|maintained=y|archived=n|An Act to prohibit dealing in ivory, and for connected purposes.}} |- | {{|Health and Social Care (National Data Guardian) Act 2018|public|31|20-12-2018|maintained=y|archived=n|An Act to establish, and make provision about, the National Data Guardian for Health and Social Care; and for connected purposes.}} |- | {{|Prisons (Interference with Wireless Telegraphy) Act 2018|public|32|20-12-2018|maintained=y|archived=n|An Act to make provision about interference with wireless telegraphy in prisons and similar institutions.}} |- | {{|Courts and Tribunals (Judiciary and Functions of Staff) Act 2018|public|33|20-12-2018|maintained=y|archived=n|An Act to make provision about the judiciary and the functions of the staff of courts and tribunals.}} |- | {{|Homes (Fitness for Human Habitation) Act 2018|public|34|20-12-2018|maintained=y|archived=n|An Act to amend the Landlord and Tenant Act 1985 to require that residential rented accommodation is provided and maintained in a state of fitness for human habitation; and for connected purposes.}} |- | {{|Finance Act 2019|public|1|12-02-2019|maintained=y|archived=n|An Act to grant certain duties, to alter other duties, and to amend the law relating to the national debt and the public revenue, and to make further provision in connection with finance.}} |- | {{|Voyeurism (Offences) Act 2019|public|2|12-02-2019|maintained=y|archived=n|An Act to make certain acts of voyeurism an offence, and for connected purposes.}} |- | {{|Counter-Terrorism and Border Security Act 2019|public|3|12-02-2019|maintained=y|archived=n|An Act to make provision in relation to terrorism; to make provision enabling persons at ports and borders to be questioned for national security and other related purposes; and for connected purposes.}} |- | {{|Tenant Fees Act 2019|public|4|12-02-2019|maintained=y|archived=n|An Act to make provision prohibiting landlords and letting agents from requiring certain payments to be made or certain other steps to be taken; to make provision about the payment of holding deposits; to make provision about enforcement and about the lead enforcement authority; to amend the provisions of the Consumer Rights Act 2015 about information to be provided by letting agents; to make provision about client money protection schemes; and for connected purposes.}} |- | {{|Crime (Overseas Production Orders) Act 2019|public|5|12-02-2019|maintained=y|archived=n|An Act to make provision about overseas production orders and about the designation of international agreements for the purposes of section 52 of the Investigatory Powers Act 2016.}} |- | {{|Supply and Appropriation (Anticipation and Adjustments) Act 2019|public|6|15-03-2019|maintained=y|archived=n|An Act to authorise the use of resources for the years ending with 31 March 2018, 31 March 2019 and 31 March 2020; to authorise the issue of sums out of the Consolidated Fund for those years; and to appropriate the supply authorised by this Act for the years ending with 31 March 2018 and 31 March 2019.}} |- | {{|Organ Donation (Deemed Consent) Act 2019|public|7|15-03-2019|maintained=y|archived=n|An Act to make amendments of the Human Tissue Act 2004 concerning consent to activities done for the purpose of transplantation; and for connected purposes.}} |- | {{|Parking (Code of Practice) Act 2019|public|8|15-03-2019|maintained=y|archived=n|An Act to make provision for and in connection with a code of practice containing guidance about the operation and management of private parking facilities; and for connected purposes.}} |- | {{|Stalking Protection Act 2019|public|9|15-03-2019|maintained=y|archived=n|An Act to make provision for orders to protect persons from risks associated with stalking; and for connected purposes.}} |- | {{|Children Act 1989 (Amendment) (Female Genital Mutilation) Act 2019|public|10|15-03-2019|maintained=y|archived=n|An Act to amend the Children Act 1989 to provide that certain proceedings under Part 1 of Schedule 2 to the Female Genital Mutilation Act 2003 are family proceedings.}} |- | {{|Northern Ireland Budget (Anticipation and Adjustments) Act 2019|public|11|15-03-2019|maintained=y|archived=n|An Act to authorise the issue out of the Consolidated Fund of Northern Ireland of certain sums for the service of the years ending 31 March 2019 and 2020; to appropriate those sums for specified purposes; to authorise the use for the public service of certain resources for those years; to revise the limits on the use of certain accruing resources in the year ending 31 March 2019; and to authorise the Department of Finance in Northern Ireland to borrow on the credit of the sum appropriated for the year ending 31 March 2020.}} |- | {{|Civil Partnerships, Marriages and Deaths (Registration etc) Act 2019|public|12|26-03-2019|maintained=y|archived=n|An Act to make provision about the registration of marriage; to make provision for the extension of civil partnerships to couples not of the same sex; to make provision for a report on the registration of pregnancy loss; to make provision about the investigation of still-births; and for connected purposes.}} |- | {{|Northern Ireland (Regional Rates and Energy) Act 2019|public|13|26-03-2019|maintained=y|archived=n|An Act to make provision about the regional rate in Northern Ireland for the year ending 31 March 2020; and amend the Renewable Heat Incentive Scheme Regulations (Northern Ireland) 2012.}} |- | {{|Healthcare (European Economic Area and Switzerland Arrangements) Act 2019|public|14|26-03-2019|maintained=y|archived=n|An Act to make provision about paying and arranging for healthcare provided in an EEA state or Switzerland and giving effect to healthcare agreements with such countries; and for connected purposes.}} |- | {{|Animal Welfare (Service Animals) Act 2019|public|15|08-04-2019|maintained=y|archived=n|An Act to amend the Animal Welfare Act 2006 in relation to service animals.}} |- | {{|European Union (Withdrawal) Act 2019|public|16|08-04-2019|maintained=y|archived=n|repealed=y|An Act to make provision in connection with the period for negotiations for withdrawing from the European Union.}} |- | {{|Offensive Weapons Act 2019|public|17|16-05-2019|maintained=y|archived=n|An Act to make provision for and in connection with offences relating to offensive weapons.}} |- | {{|Mental Capacity (Amendment) Act 2019|public|18|16-05-2019|maintained=y|archived=n|An Act to amend the Mental Capacity Act 2005 in relation to procedures in accordance with which a person may be deprived of liberty where the person lacks capacity to consent; and for connected purposes.}} |- | {{|Non-Domestic Rating (Preparation for Digital Services) Act 2019|public|19|04-07-2019|maintained=y|archived=n|An Act to make provision enabling the Commissioners for Her Majesty's Revenue and Customs to incur expenditure in connection with digital services to be provided by them for the purpose of facilitating the administration or payment of non-domestic rates in England.}} |- | {{|Holocaust (Return of Cultural Objects) (Amendment) Act 2019|public|20|04-07-2019|maintained=y|archived=n|An Act to prevent the Holocaust (Return of Cultural Objects) Act 2009 from expiring on 11 November 2019.}} |- | {{|Supply and Appropriation (Main Estimates) Act 2019|public|21|17-07-2019|maintained=y|archived=n|An Act to authorise the use of resources for the year ending with 31 March 2020; to authorise both the issue of sums out of the Consolidated Fund and the application of income for that year; and to appropriate the supply authorised for that year by this Act and by the Supply and Appropriation (Anticipation and Adjustments) Act 2019.}} |- | {{|Northern Ireland (Executive Formation etc) Act 2019|public|22|24-07-2019|maintained=y|archived=n|An Act to extend the period for forming an Executive under section 1(1) of the Northern Ireland (Executive Formation and Exercise of Functions) Act 2018 and to impose a duty on the Secretary of State to report on progress towards the formation of an Executive in Northern Ireland and other matters; to impose duties to make regulations changing the law of Northern Ireland on certain matters, subject to the formation of an Executive; and for connected purposes.}} |- | {{|National Insurance Contributions (Termination Awards and Sporting Testimonials) Act 2019|public|23|24-07-2019|maintained=y|archived=n|An Act to provide for Class 1A national insurance contributions on certain termination awards; and to provide for the controller of a sporting testimonial to be the person liable to pay Class 1A national insurance contributions on payments from money raised by the testimonial.}} |- | {{|Wild Animals in Circuses Act 2019|public|24|24-07-2019|maintained=y|archived=n|An Act to make provision to prohibit the use of wild animals in travelling circuses.}} |- | {{|Kew Gardens (Leases) Act 2019|public|25|09-09-2019|maintained=y|archived=n|An Act to provide that the Secretary of State's powers in relation to the management of the Royal Botanic Gardens, Kew, include the power to grant a lease in respect of land for a period of up to 150 years.}} |- | {{|European Union (Withdrawal) (No. 2) Act 2019|public|26|09-09-2019|maintained=y|archived=n|repealed=y|An Act to make further provision in connection with the period for negotiations for withdrawing from the European Union.}} |- | {{|Parliamentary Buildings (Restoration and Renewal) Act 2019|public|27|08-10-2019|note3= (Note: Royal Assent was initially given on 9 September 2019 and signified during the prorogation ceremony that evening. However, as that Royal Assent was given in the same Letters Patent ordering the prorogation that were then quashed by the Supreme Court when it ruled the prorogation unlawful, Royal Assent had to be given again under the terms of the Royal Assent Act 1967. Royal Assent was subsequently given during the prorogation ceremony on 8 October.)|maintained=y|archived=n|An Act to make provision in connection with works for or in connection with the restoration of the Palace of Westminster and other works relating to the Parliamentary Estate; and for connected purposes.}} |- | {{|Census (Return Particulars and Removal of Penalties) Act 2019|public|28|08-10-2019|maintained=y|archived=n|An Act to amend the Census Act 1920 and the Census Act (Northern Ireland) 1969 in relation to the provision of particulars about sexual orientation and gender identity.}} }}

== Local acts ==
{{legislationuk|act |- | {{|New Southgate Cemetery Act 2017|local|2|16-11-2017|maintained=y|archived=n|An Act to confer powers upon New Southgate Cemetery and Crematorium Limited and the National Spiritual Assembly of the Baháʼís of the United Kingdom to extinguish rights of burial and disturb human remains in New Southgate Cemetery for the purpose of increasing the space for interments; and for connected purposes.}} |- | {{|City of London Corporation (Open Spaces) Act 2018|local|1|15-03-2018|maintained=y|archived=n|An Act to make provision relating to the public open spaces under the management and control of the City of London Corporation; and for related purposes.}} |- | {{|Middle Level Act 2018|local|2|01-11-2018|maintained=y|archived=n|An Act to amend and update the powers of the Middle Level Commissioners to regulate navigation on the Middle Level of the Fens in the city of Peterborough and the counties of Cambridgeshire and Norfolk; to make further provision as to the regulation of navigation on those waterways; to make other provision as to the Commissioners; and for connected purposes.}} |- | {{|University of London Act 2018|local|3|20-12-2018|maintained=y|archived=n|An Act to make new provision for the making of statutes for the University of London; and for related purposes.}} }}
