= Bishoprics of Chester and Man Act 1541 =

Act of the Parliament of England

- Act of Parliament
- Parliament of England
- Long title: An Act for dissevering the Bishoprick of Chester and of the Isle of Man from the jurisdiction of Canterbury to the jurisdiction of York
- Citation: 33 Hen. 8. c. 31
- Territorial extent: England and Wales; Isle of Man

Dates
- Royal assent: 1 April 1542
- Commencement: 16 January 1542 (Note: Start of session.)

Status: Current legislation

Text of statute as originally enacted

The Bishoprics of Chester and Man Act 1541 (33 Hen. 8. c. 31) is an act of the Parliament of England that transferred the jurisdiction over the Dioceses of Chester and Sodor and Man from the Archdiocese of Canterbury to the Archdiocese of York.

It was a rare pre-revestment example the English Parliament exercising its rights to pass legislation for the Isle of Man, notwithstanding the Island's own insular parliament, Tynwald.

The long title of the act was An Act for dissevering the Bishoprick of Chester and of the Isle of Man from the jurisdiction of Canterbury to the jurisdiction of York. The act, its action having been spent, has since been repealed.
