= List of acts of the Parliament of England from 1541 =

This is a list of acts of the Parliament of England for the year 1541.

For acts passed during the period 1707–1800, see the list of acts of the Parliament of Great Britain. See also the list of acts of the Parliament of Scotland, and the list of acts of the Parliament of Ireland.

For acts passed from 1801 onwards, see the list of acts of the Parliament of the United Kingdom. For acts of the devolved parliaments and assemblies in the United Kingdom, see the list of acts of the Scottish Parliament, the list of acts of the Northern Ireland Assembly, and the list of acts and measures of Senedd Cymru; see also the list of acts of the Parliament of Northern Ireland.

For medieval statutes, etc. that are not considered to be acts of Parliament, see the list of English statutes.

See also the List of ordinances and acts of the Parliament of England, 1642–1660 for ordinances and acts passed by the Long Parliament and other bodies without royal assent, and which were not considered to be valid legislation following the Restoration in 1660.

The number shown after each act's title is its chapter number. Acts are cited using this number, preceded by the years of the reign during which the relevant parliamentary session was held; thus the Union with Ireland Act 1800 is cited as "39 & 40 Geo. 3. c. 67", meaning the 67th act passed during the session that started in the 39th year of the reign of George III and which finished in the 40th year of that reign. The modern convention is to use Arabic numerals in citations (thus "41 Geo. 3" rather than "41 Geo. III"). Acts of the last session of the Parliament of Great Britain and the first session of the Parliament of the United Kingdom are both cited as "41 Geo. 3".

Acts passed by the Parliament of England did not have a short title; however, some of these acts have subsequently been given a short title by acts of the Parliament of the United Kingdom, such as the Short Titles Act 1896 (59 & 60 Vict. c. 14).

Acts passed by the Parliament of England were deemed to have come into effect on the first day of the session in which they were passed. Because of this, the years given in the list below may in fact be the year before a particular act was passed.

== 33 Hen. 8 ==
The first session of the 8th Parliament of King Henry VIII, which met from 16 January 1542 until 1 April 1542.

This session was also traditionally cited as 33 H. 8.

=== Public acts ===
Short title	Citation	Royal assent
Long title
Counterfeit Letters, etc. Act 1541 (repealed)	33 Hen. 8. c. 1	1 April 1542
An Act concerning counterfeit Letters or privy Tokens to receive Money or Goods in other Men's Names. (Repealed for England and Wales by Criminal Statutes Repeal Act 1827 (7 & 8 Geo. 4. c. 27) and for India by Criminal Law (India) Act 1828 (9 Geo. 4. c. 74))
Fish Act 1541 (repealed)	33 Hen. 8. c. 2	1 April 1542
An Act concerning buying of Fish upon the Sea. (Repealed by Repeal of Acts Concerning Importation Act 1822 (3 Geo. 4. c. 41))
Welsh Cloths Act 1541 (repealed)	33 Hen. 8. c. 3	1 April 1542
An Act for folding of Cloths in North Wales. (Repealed by Woollen Manufacture Act 1809 (49 Geo. 3. c. 109))
Pewterers Act 1541 (repealed)	33 Hen. 8. c. 4	1 April 1542
An Act concerning Pewterers. (Repealed by Statute Law Revision Act 1863 (26 & 27 Vict. c. 125))
Horses Act 1541 (repealed)	33 Hen. 8. c. 5	1 April 1542
An Act concerning keeping of great Horses. (Repealed by Continuance, etc. of Laws Act 1623 (21 Jas. 1. c. 28)
Cross-bows Act 1541 (repealed)	33 Hen. 8. c. 6	1 April 1542
An Act concerning Cross-bows and Hand-guns. (Repealed for England and Wales by Game Act 1831 (1 & 2 Will. 4. c. 32) and for the Isle of Man by Statute Law Revision (Isle of Man) Act 1991 (c. 61))
Exportation Act 1541 (repealed)	33 Hen. 8. c. 7	1 April 1542
An Act concerning the Conveyance of Brass, Latten and Bell-metal over the Sea. (Repealed by Repeal of Acts Concerning Importation Act 1822 (53 Geo. 3. c. 45))
Witchcraft Act 1541 (repealed)	33 Hen. 8. c. 8	1 April 1542
An Act against Conjurations, Witchcrafts, Sorcery and Inchantments. (Repealed by Statute Law Revision Act 1863 (26 & 27 Vict. c. 125))
Unlawful Games Act 1541 (repealed)	33 Hen. 8. c. 9	1 April 1542
An Act for the Maintenance of Artillery, and debarring unlawful Games. (Repealed by Betting and Gaming Act 1960 (8 & 9 Eliz. 2. c. 60))
Justice of the Peace Act 1541 (repealed)	33 Hen. 8. c. 10	1 April 1542
An Act concerning the Execution of certain Statutes. (Repealed by Justice of the Peace Act 1545 (37 Hen. 8. c. 7))
Butchers Act 1541 (repealed)	33 Hen. 8. c. 11	1 April 1542
An Act for Butchers to sell at their Liberty by Weight or otherwise. (Repealed by Statute Law Revision Act 1863 (26 & 27 Vict. c. 125))
Offences within the Court Act 1541 (repealed)	33 Hen. 8. c. 12	1 April 1542
An Act for Murder and malicious Bloodshed within the Court. (Repealed by Criminal Law Act 1967 (c. 58))
Lordships of Wales Act 1541 (repealed)	33 Hen. 8. c. 13	1 April 1542
An Acte concerning certain Lordshippess translated from the Countie of Denbigh to the Countye of Flyntshire. (Repealed by Statute Law (Repeals) Act 1977 (c. 18))
Prophecies Act 1541 (repealed)	33 Hen. 8. c. 14	1 April 1542
An Act concerning false Prophecies upon Declaration of Names, Arms or Badges. (Repealed by Statute Law Revision Act 1863 (26 & 27 Vict. c. 125))
Sanctuary Act 1541 (repealed)	33 Hen. 8. c. 15	1 April 1542
An Act touching the Translation of the Sanctuary from Manchester to Westchester. (Repealed by Statute Law Revision Act 1863 (26 & 27 Vict. c. 125))
Worsted Yarn Act 1541 (repealed)	33 Hen. 8. c. 16	1 April 1542
An Act for Worsted (Note: Worstead.) Yarn in Norfolk. (Repealed by Repeal of Obsolete Statutes Act 1856 (19 & 20 Vict. c. 64))
Continuation of Laws Act 1541 (repealed)	33 Hen. 8. c. 17	1 April 1542
An Act for Confirmation and Continuation of certain Acts. (Repealed by Statute Law Revision Act 1863 (26 & 27 Vict. c. 125))
Kerseys Act 1541 (repealed)	33 Hen. 8. c. 18	1 April 1542
An Act for true making of Kerseys. (Note: Kersey (cloth)) (Repealed by Statute Law Revision Act 1863 (26 & 27 Vict. c. 125))
Exportation Act 1541 (repealed)	33 Hen. 8. c. 19	1 April 1542
An Act expounding a certain Statute concerning the shipping of Cloths. (Repealed by Woollen Manufacture Act 1810 (50 Geo. 3. c. 83), confirmed by Repeal of Acts Concerning Importation Act 1822 (3 Geo. 4. c. 41))
Treason Act 1541 (repealed)	33 Hen. 8. c. 20	11 February 1542
An Act for due Process to be had in High Treasons, in Cases of Lunacy or Madness. (Repealed by Statute Law Revision Act 1863 (26 & 27 Vict. c. 125) and Statute Law Revision Act 1948 (11 & 12 Geo. 6. c. 62))
Royal Assent by Commission Act 1541 (repealed)	33 Hen. 8. c. 21	11 February 1542
An Act concerning the Attainder of the late Queen Catherine (Note: Catherine Howard) and her Complices. (Repealed by Royal Assent Act 1967 (c. 23))
Wards and Liveries Act 1541 (repealed)	33 Hen. 8. c. 22	1 April 1542
An Act concerning the Order of Wards and Liveries. (Repealed by Tenures Abolition Act 1660 (12 Cha. 2. c. 24))
Criminal Law Act 1541 (repealed)	33 Hen. 8. c. 23	1 April 1542
An Act to proceed by Commission of Oyer and Determiner (Note: Oyer and terminer) against such Persons as shall confess Treason, &c., without remanding the same to be tried in the Shire where the Offence was committed. (Repealed by Offences Against the Person Act 1828 (9 Geo. 4. c. 31) and for India by Criminal Law (India) Act 1828 (9 Geo. 4. c. 74))
Justices of Assize, etc. Act 1541 (repealed)	33 Hen. 8. c. 24	1 April 1542
An Act that no Man shall be Justice of Assise in his own Country. (Repealed by Supreme Court of Judicature (Consolidation) Act 1925 (15 & 16 Geo. 5. c. 49))
Naturalization of Certain Children Born Overseas Act 1541 (repealed)	33 Hen. 8. c. 25	1 April 1542
An Act for making free certain Children born, beyond the Sea, and to put the same Children in the Nature of mere Englishmen. (Repealed by Statute Law Revision Act 1948 (11 & 12 Geo. 6. c. 62))
Conveyances by Sir John Shelton Made Void Act 1541 (repealed)	33 Hen. 8. c. 26	1 April 1542
An Act to make frustrate certain Conveyances devised by Sir Jhon Shelton. (Note: Sir John Shelton) (Repealed by Statute Law (Repeals) Act 1978 (c. 45))
Leases by Corporations Act 1541 (repealed)	33 Hen. 8. c. 27	1 April 1542
An Act for Leases of Hospitals, Colleges and other Corporations to be good and effectual with the Consent of the more Party. (Repealed by Charities Act 1960 (8 & 9 Eliz. 2. c. 58))
Clergy Act 1541 (repealed)	33 Hen. 8. c. 28	1 April 1542
An Act for the Chancellor of the Duchy of Lancaster, the Chancellor of the Augmentations, and certain other Noblemen, to retain Chaplains. (Repealed by Statute Law Revision Act 1863 (26 & 27 Vict. c. 125))
Monasteries, etc. Act 1541 (repealed)	33 Hen. 8. c. 29	1 April 1542
An Act to enable Persons late Religious to sue and to be sued. (Repealed by Statute Law Revision Act 1863 (26 & 27 Vict. c. 125))
Coventry and Lichfield Act 1541 (repealed)	33 Hen. 8. c. 30	1 April 1542
An Act confirming the Authority of the Dean and Chapter of Lichfield (Note: Lichfield Cathedral) making Leases and other Grants. (Repealed by Statute Law Revision Act 1948 (11 & 12 Geo. 6. c. 62))
Bishoprics of Chester and Man Act 1541	33 Hen. 8. c. 31	1 April 1542
An Act dissevering the Bishoprick of Chester (Note: Diocese of Chester), and of the Isle of Man, from the jurisdiction of Canterbury to the Jurisdiction of York.
Whitegate Church (Chester) Act 1541	33 Hen. 8. c. 32	1 April 1542
An Act for the Parish Church of Whitegate to be made a Parish Church of itself, and no Part of the Parish of Over.
Hull Corporation (Fishermen) Act 1541 (repealed)	33 Hen. 8. c. 33	1 April 1542
An Act concerning the Privileges of Kingston upon Hull. (Repealed by Statute Law Revision Act 1948 (11 & 12 Geo. 6. c. 62))
Fairs at King's Lynn Act 1541	33 Hen. 8. c. 34	1 April 1542
An Act for the Town of Lyne, touching the Revocation of two Fairs.
Gloucester Water Supply Act 1541 (repealed)	33 Hen. 8. c. 35	1 April 1542
An Act concerning the Conduits at Gloucester. (Repealed by Statute Law (Repeals) Act 1978 (c. 45))
Repair of Canterbury and Other Towns Act 1541 (repealed)	33 Hen. 8. c. 36	1 April 1542
An Act for repairing of Canterbury, Rochester, Stamford, and divers other Towns. (Repealed by Statute Law Revision Act 1948 (11 & 12 Geo. 6. c. 62))
Honour of Ampthill Act 1541 (repealed)	33 Hen. 8. c. 37	1 April 1542
An Act touching the Honour of Ampthyll. (Repealed by Statute Law (Repeals) Act 1978 (c. 45))
Honour of Grafton Act 1541 (repealed)	33 Hen. 8. c. 38	1 April 1542
An Act concerning the Honour of Grafton. (Repealed by Statute Law (Repeals) Act 1978 (c. 45))
Crown Debts Act 1541 (repealed)	33 Hen. 8. c. 39	1 April 1542
An Act concerning the Erection of the Court of Surveyors. (Repealed by Supreme Court Act 1981 (c. 54))

=== Private acts ===
Short title	Citation	Royal assent
Long title
Attainder of Richard Pate and Seth Hollond Act 1541	33 Hen. 8. c. 40 Pr. (Note: This is the citation in The Statutes of the Realm.); 33 Hen. 8. c. 1 Pr. (Note: This is the citation in The Statutes at Large.)	1 April 1542
An Act of the Attainder of Richarde Pates (Note: Richard Pate (bishop)) and Sethe Holland, Clerks.
Talbot Estate Act 1541	33 Hen. 8. c. 41 Pr. 33 Hen. 8. c. 2 Pr.	1 April 1542
An Act for Sir Gilbert Talbot, concerning the Manor of Grafton and Upton Waren. (Note: Upton Warren, Worcestershire)
Prebend of Blewbury Act 1541	33 Hen. 8. c. 42 Pr. 33 Hen. 8. c. 3 Pr.	1 April 1542
An Act for the uniting the Prebend of Blowberye (Note: Blewbury, Berkshire) to the Bishoprick of Sar.; and for assuring the Lordship of Godalmynge to Thomas Paston, in recompence of the same Prebend.
Exchange Between Lord Admiral and Bishop of Rochester Act 1541	33 Hen. 8. c. 43 Pr. 33 Hen. 8. c. 4 Pr.	1 April 1542
An Act of Exchange between the Lord Admiral and the Bishop of Rochestre, of the Houses of Saint Swythynes in Southwerk and Cheswyke.
King's College Cambridge Estate Act 1541	33 Hen. 8. c. 44 Pr. 33 Hen. 8. c. 5 Pr.	1 April 1542
An Act for certain Lands to be assured to the King's Colledge in Cambrydge.
Marchioness of Dorset's Jointure Act 1541	33 Hen. 8. c. 45 Pr. 33 Hen. 8. c. 8 Pr.	1 April 1542
An Act for the Jointure of the Lady Marques Dorsett.
Lady Dacres Estate Act 1541	33 Hen. 8. c. 46 Pr. 33 Hen. 8. c. 9 Pr.	1 April 1542
An Act concerning certain Lands to be assured to the Lady Dacres.

=== Sources ===
- "33° Hen. VIII". The Statutes of the Realm. Vol. 3: 1509 to 1547. pp. 826–892 – via HathiTrust.
- "Anno tricesimo tertio Henrici VIII". The Statutes at Large. Vol. 5 – 32 Henry VIII to 7 Edward VI – 1540 to 1552–3. pp. 65–129 – via Internet Archive.
- Journal of the House of Lords. Vol. 1: 1509-1577. London: His Majesty's Stationery Office. 1830 – via British History Online.
- Chronological Table of and Index to the Statutes. Vol. 1: To the End of the Session 59 Vict. Sess. 2 (1895) (13th ed.). London: Her Majesty's Stationery Office. 1896. pp. 51–52 – via Google Books.
- Chronological Table of the Statutes: Covering the Period from 1235 to the End of 1971. London: Her Majesty's Stationery Office. 1972. pp. 48–49. ISBN 978-0-11-840096-1 – via Google Books.
- "Chronological Tables of the Private and Personal Acts: Part 1 (1539–1601)". legislation.gov.uk. The National Archives.

== See also ==
- List of acts of the Parliament of England
