= Leases by Corporations Act 1541 =

Act of the Parliament of England

Leases by Corporations Act 1541 (Note: The citation of this act by this short title was authorised by section 5 of, and the second schedule to, the Statute Law Revision Act 1948. Due to the repeal of those provisions, it is now authorised by section 19(2) of the Interpretation Act 1978.)
- Act of Parliament
- Parliament of England
- Long title: An Acte for Leases of Hospitales Colledges and other Corporacions be good and effectuall with the consent of the more partie. (Note: These words are printed against this act in the second column of the second schedule to the Statute Law Revision Act 1948, which is headed "Title".)
- Citation: 33 Hen. 8. c. 27
- Territorial extent: England and Wales

Dates
- Royal assent: 1 April 1542
- Commencement: 16 January 1542 (Note: Start of session.)
- Repealed: 1 January 1961

Other legislation
- Repealed by: Charities Act 1960

Status: Repealed

Text of statute as originally enacted

The Leases by Corporations Act 1541 (33 Hen. 8. c. 27) was an act of the Parliament of England.

The act provided "that any powers belonging to a corporation can be exercised by a majority of the corporators, notwithstanding any directions to the contrary in their foundation statutes."

== Subsequent development ==
The whole act was repealed by section 39(1) of, and schedule 5 to, the Charities Act 1960 (8 & 9 Eliz. 2. c. 58), which came into force on 1 January 1961.
