= Treason Act 1541 =

Act of the Parliament of England

- Act of Parliament
- Parliament of England
- Long title: An Act for due Process to be had in High Treasons, in Cases of Lunacy or Madness.
- Citation: 33 Hen. 8. c. 20
- Territorial extent: England and Wales

Dates
- Royal assent: 1 April 1542
- Commencement: 16 January 1542 (Note: Start of session.)
- Repealed: 30 July 1948
Other legislation
Amended by	Treason Act 1554
Repealed by	Statute Law Revision Act 1863; Statute Law Revision Act 1948

Status: Repealed

Text of statute as originally enacted

The Treason Act 1541 or the Consequences of Attainer for Treason Act 1541 (33 Hen. 8. c. 20) was an act of the Parliament of England passed in 1542 (acts of Parliament were backdated to the year in which the session of Parliament had begun, rather than the year in which the act was actually passed). It provided for the trial and punishment of lunatics for high treason. The reason given for passing the act was given by the act itself, which stated "it is a thing almost impossible certainly to judge" whether a defendant's madness was real or feigned.

== Provisions of the act ==
Section I of the act provided for the trial of a person who committed treason "when they were in good, whole and perfect memory, and after their accusation, examination and confession thereof before any [of] the King's majesty's council, shall happen to fall to madness or lunacy". If it appeared to at least four of the council that the defendant was sane at the time of their offence and at their "accusation, examination and confession," then a commission was to investigate the treason, swear in a jury, and try the defendant in his absence in the same manner as they would if he were sane and present. The section specifically provided that evidence would be admissible for the defence as well as for the prosecution. If convicted, the defendant would receive the same penalty as a sane defendant (death).

The same procedure applied to a peer of the realm, except that they would be tried by their peers before the Lord High Steward instead of by a jury and a normal judge.

Section II of the act said that if the defendant had already been tried and convicted before he turned insane, then he was still to be executed in the normal manner.

The act was retrospective and applied to treasons committed before as well as after it was passed. Its effect was reversed by the Treason Act 1554 (1 & 2 Ph. & M. c. 10).

== Subsequent developments ==
Criminal Law Act 1541
- Act of Parliament
- Parliament of England
- Long title: An Act to proceed by Commission of Oyer and Determiner against such Persons as shall confess Treason, &c., without remanding the same to be tried in the Shire where the Offence was committed.
- Citation: 33 Hen. 8. c. 23
- Territorial extent: England and Wales; India

Dates
- Royal assent: 1 April 1542
- Commencement: 16 January 1542 (Note: Start of session.)
- Repealed: 1 July 1828 (England and Wales); 1 March 1829 (India)
Other legislation
Amended by	Juries Act 1825
Repealed by	Offences Against the Person Act 1828 (England and Wales); Criminal Law (India) Act 1828 (India)

Status: Repealed

Text of statute as originally enacted

Another act, the Criminal Law Act 1541 (33 Hen. 8. c. 23), abolished peremptory challenge in trials for treason and misprision of treason. This act was repealed by the Treason Act 1554 (1 & 2 Ph. & M. c. 10, sec. 7). The Royal Assent by Commission Act 1541 (33 Hen. 8. c. 21) created various new kinds of high treason (which were abolished by the Treason Act 1547 (1 Edw. 6. c. 12)).

Sections 1 and 2, and section 3 to "lunacye notwithstandinge" of the 1541 act was repealed by section 1 of, and the schedule to, the Statute Law Revision Act 1863 (26 & 27 Vict. c. 125), which came into force on 28 July 1863.

The whole act of the 1541 act, so far as unrepealed, was repealed by section 1 of, and the first schedule to, the Statute of Law Revision Act 1948 (11 & 12 Geo. 6. c. 62), which came into force on 30 July 1948.

== See also ==
- High treason in the United Kingdom
- Treason Act
