= Scottish Militia Bill =

1708 United Kingdom legislation vetoed by Queen Anne

- Bill
- Parliament of Great Britain
- Long title: A Bill for settling the Militia of that Part of Great Britain called Scotland
- Territorial extent: Scotland

Status: Not passed

The Scottish Militia Bill 1708 (known formerly as the Scotch Militia Bill) was a bill that was passed by the House of Commons and House of Lords of the Parliament of Great Britain in early 1708. However, on 11 March 1708, Queen Anne withheld royal assent on the advice of her ministers for fear that the proposed militia would be disloyal. This was due to the sudden appearance of a Franco-Jacobite invasion fleet en route to Scotland which gave ministers second thoughts at the last minute about allowing it to reach the statute books. As of 2026, it is the last occasion on which the royal veto has been used in Great Britain or the United Kingdom.

== Content ==
The bill's long title was "A Bill for settling the Militia of that Part of Great Britain called Scotland". Its object was to arm the Scottish militia, which had not been recreated at the Restoration. This happened as the unification between Scotland and England under the Acts of Union 1707 had been passed.

On the day the bill was meant to be signed, news came that the French were sailing toward Scotland for the planned invasion of 1708 and there was suspicion that a significant portion of the Scottish population might be disloyal. Therefore, support for a veto was strong and the Queen refused her royal assent to the bill.

== Significance ==
The Scottish Militia Bill 1708 is the last bill to have been refused royal assent. Before this, King William III had vetoed bills passed by Parliament six times. Royal assent to bills generally came to be viewed as a mere formality once both Houses of Parliament had successfully read a bill three times, or a general election had taken place. No royal veto has taken place for legislation since. (Note: In 2023, Gender Recognition Reform (Scotland) Bill was subject to a post-legislative veto, however the bill was vetoed by the Secretary of State for Scotland (who has power to do so under section 35 of the Scotland Act 1998), not by the Sovereign.)

In the British colonies, the denial of royal assent (exercised on the advice of ministers) had continued past 1708, and was one of the primary complaints of the United States Declaration of Independence in 1776: that the King "has refused his Assent to Laws, most wholesome and necessary for the public Good" and "He has forbidden his Governors to pass Laws of immediate and pressing Importance". Similar provisions existed elsewhere in the British Empire, most notably disallowance and reservation in Canada, which fell into disuse in the 20th century.
