= Royal Assent by Commission Act 1541 =

Act of the Parliament of England

Royal Assent by Commission Act 1541 (Note: The citation of this act by this short title was authorised by section 5 of, and the second schedule to, the Statute Law Revision Act 1948. Due to the repeal of those provisions, it is now authorised by section 19(2) of the Interpretation Act 1978.)
- Act of Parliament
- Parliament of England
- Long title: An Act concerning the Attainder of the late Queen Catherine and her Complices. The Bill of Atteynder of Mestres Katherin Hawarde late Quene of England, and divers other personnes her complices. (Note: These words are printed against this act in the second column of the second schedule to the Statute Law Revision Act 1948, which is headed "Title".)
- Citation: 33 Hen. 8. c. 21
- Territorial extent: England and Wales

Dates
- Royal assent: 1 April 1542
- Commencement: 16 January 1542 (Note: Start of session).
- Repealed: 10 May 1967

Other legislation
- Amended by: Statute Law Revision Act 1863
- Repealed by: Royal Assent Act 1967

Status: Repealed

Text of statute as originally enacted

The Royal Assent by Commission Act 1541 (33 Hen. 8. c. 21) was an act of the Parliament of England, passed in 1542, (Note: Acts of Parliament were dated according to the year in which the session of Parliament began, rather than the year in which the act was passed.) which attainted Queen Catherine Howard for adultery, thereby authorising her execution. (Note: The text of the act did not prescribe any punishment, with it stating that "Queen Katharine[sic] [is hereby] attained of Treason...", for which the punishment was death.) It also provided that all of Queen Catherine's assets were to be forfeited to the Crown while also creating a new method in which royal assent could be granted to legislation.

Queen Catherine was to be convicted by bill of attainder, rather than by ordinary prosecution in a court of law. However, until 1542 royal assent could be granted only by the king in person, at a ceremony in which the whole text of the bill would be read aloud. King Henry decided that "the repetition of so grievous a Story and the recital of so infamous a Crime" in his presence "might reopen a Wound already closing in the Royal Bosom". To avoid this, Parliament inserted a clause in the bill of attainder, which provided that royal assent could be granted by commissioners appointed for the purpose, instead of by the king in person. Initially used sparingly, the new procedure gradually became used more often until it became the usual way. The last monarch to grant royal assent in person was Queen Victoria in 1854.

== Other provisions ==
The act was more than an act of attainder, however. It also made it high treason for any person who married the King (or his successors) to conceal from the monarch their previous sexual history. It became treason for any third party to conceal such knowledge for longer than 20 days after the marriage, or to incite another to have "carnal knowledge" of the queen consort, or of the wife of the monarch's son, or for the queen or princess to incite somebody to do so. These provisions were repealed by the section 2 of the Treason Act 1547 (1 Edw. 6. c. 12).

== Subsequent developments ==
Section 6 and 8–10 of the act were repealed by section 1 of, and the schedule to, the Statute Law Revision Act 1863 (26 & 27 Vict. c. 125), which came into force on 28 July 1863..

The whole act was repealed by section 2(2) of the Royal Assent Act 1967 (c. 23), which however preserved the Commissioners' role.

This act was repealed for the Republic of Ireland by sections 2(1) and 3(1) of, and part 2 of schedule 2 to the Statute Law Revision Act 2007.

== See also ==
- Treason Act 1541
- High treason in the United Kingdom
