= Royal Assent Act 1967 =

Act of the Parliament of the United Kingdom

Royal Assent Act 1967 (Note: Section 2(1).)
- Act of Parliament
- Parliament of the United Kingdom
- Long title: An Act to amend the law relating to the signification of Her Majesty's Royal Assent.
- Citation: 1967 c. 23
- Territorial extent: United Kingdom

Dates
- Royal assent: 10 May 1967
- Commencement: 10 May 1967 (Note: The Acts of Parliament (Commencement) Act 1793.)
Other legislation
Repeals/revokes	Royal Assent by Commission Act 1541

Status: Current legislation

Text of statute as originally enacted

Revised text of statute as amended

Text of the Royal Assent Act 1967 as in force today (including any amendments) within the United Kingdom, from legislation.gov.uk.

The Royal Assent Act 1967 (c. 23) is an act of the Parliament of the United Kingdom that amends the law relating to the signification of royal assent to allow laws from the Parliament of the United Kingdom to be enacted through the pronunciation and notification of both Houses of Parliament, and repeals the Royal Assent by Commission Act 1541 (33 Hen. 8. c. 21). It received royal assent on 10 May 1967.

The act does not apply to the royal assent of any legislation that is and has been passed by the Scottish Parliament, Welsh Parliament or the Northern Ireland Assembly (nor its predecessor the Northern Ireland Parliament which did exist at the time the act was passed).

Nothing in the act affects the power of the monarch to signify their royal assent in person in the House of Lords. Queen Victoria was the last sovereign to do so in 1854.
