= Lords Commissioners =

Privy Counsellors who exercise certain functions in the UK Parliament

The Lords Commissioners are privy counsellors appointed by the monarch of the United Kingdom to exercise, on his or her behalf, certain functions relating to Parliament which would otherwise require the monarch's attendance at the Palace of Westminster. These include the opening and prorogation of Parliament, the confirmation of a newly elected Speaker of the House of Commons and the granting of royal assent. The Lords Commissioners are collectively known as the Royal Commission. The Royal Commission includes at least three—and usually five—Lords Commissioners. In current practice, the Lords Commissioners usually include the Lord Chancellor, the Archbishop of Canterbury (who is named but usually does not participate), the leaders of the three major parties in the House of Lords, the convenor of the House of Lords Crossbenchers and (since 2007) the Lord Speaker. Occasionally there are substitutions (such as deputy party leaders) if the normal commissioners are unavailable.

The Lord Chancellor serves as the most senior Lord Commissioner after the Archbishop of Canterbury, who in modern times never participates in the Commission. Traditionally the Lord Chancellor took part in the ceremony and presided over the Royal Commission. However, since the 2007 appointment of Jack Straw, a member of the House of Commons, as Lord Chancellor the person in that office does not participate in Royal Commissions, much like the Archbishop of Canterbury. In this case, the Leader of the House of Lords performs the duties of the Lord Chancellor, with the Lord Speaker of the House of Lords serving as a Lord Commissioner. Exceptions to this procedure were seen in 2009 and 2019, when royal approbation was declared to the elections of John Bercow and Lindsay Hoyle as Commons speaker. On these occasions the lord chancellor, respectively Jack Straw and Robert Buckland, performed this function personally and the Lord Speaker did not serve as a Lord Commissioner.

The Lords Commissioners enter the chamber of the House of Lords at the appointed time, and take seats on a structure temporarily placed for the duration of the ceremony. The Lord Chancellor or Leader of the House of Lords, as the most senior Lord Commissioner, commands the gentleman/lady usher of the Black Rod to summon the House of Commons. Representatives of the House of Commons arrive at the Bar of the House of Lords, and bow thrice, but do not actually enter the Lords Chamber. After each bow, male Lords Commissioners doff their hats to the members of Parliament while female Lords Commissioners bow their heads in return. The reading clerk of the House of Lords then reads the Monarch's Commission, which authorises the Lords Commissioners. After the appropriate business has been transacted, the Commons again bow thrice and depart.
