= Royal assent =

Formal approval of a proposed law in monarchies

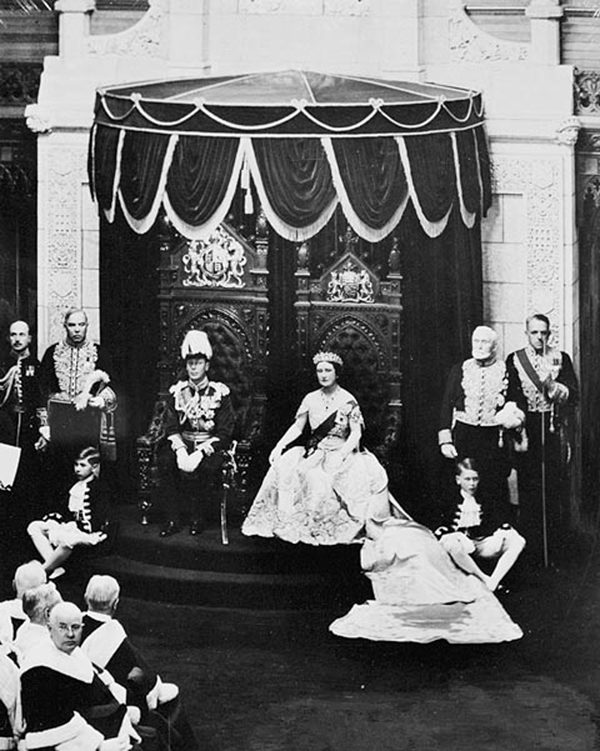
King George VI, accompanied by Queen Elizabeth, grants royal assent to laws in the Canadian Senate, 19 May 1939

Royal assent is the method by which a monarch formally approves an act of the legislature, either directly or through an official acting on the monarch's behalf. In some jurisdictions, royal assent is equivalent to promulgation, while in others that is a separate step. Under a modern constitutional monarchy, royal assent is considered little more than a formality. Even in nations such as the United Kingdom, Norway, the Netherlands, Liechtenstein and Monaco which still, in theory, permit their monarch to withhold assent to laws, the monarch almost never does so, except in a dire political emergency or on advice of government. While the power to veto by withholding royal assent was once exercised often by European monarchs, such an occurrence has been very rare since the eighteenth century.

Royal assent is typically associated with elaborate ceremony. In the United Kingdom the Sovereign may appear personally in the House of Lords or may appoint Lords Commissioners, who announce that royal assent has been granted at a ceremony held at the Palace of Westminster for this purpose. Royal assent is usually granted less ceremonially by letters patent. In many Commonwealth realms, royal assent is delegated to a governor-general as the representative of the monarch.

== Usage ==
=== United Kingdom ===
Before the Royal Assent by Commission Act 1541 (33 Hen. 8. c. 21) allowed for delegation of the power to Lords Commissioners, assent was always required to be given by the sovereign in person before Parliament. The last time it was given by the sovereign in person in Parliament was during the reign of Queen Victoria at a prorogation on 12 August 1854. (Note: This was also the last occasion on which Parliament was prorogued by the monarch in person) The act was repealed and replaced by the Royal Assent Act 1967. Section 1(2) of that act does not prevent the sovereign from declaring assent in person if he or she so desires.

Royal assent is the final step required for a parliamentary bill to become law. Once a bill is presented to the Sovereign, he or she has the following formal options:

- grant royal assent, thereby making the bill an act of Parliament.
- delay the bill's assent through the use of reserve powers, thereby invoking a veto.
- refuse royal assent, by convention on the advice of his or her ministers.

The last bill that was refused assent was the Scottish Militia Bill during Queen Anne's reign in 1708. Some authorities have stated that the sovereign no longer has the power to withhold assent from a bill against the advice of ministers.

Under modern constitutional conventions, the sovereign generally acts on, and in accordance with, the advice of their ministers. There is some disagreement among scholars as to whether the monarch should withhold royal assent to a bill if advised to do so by their ministers.

Since these ministers most often enjoy the support of Parliament and obtain the passage of bills, it is unlikely that they would advise the sovereign to withhold assent. Hence, in modern practice, the issue has never arisen, and royal assent has not been withheld. This possibility did arise during the early days of the premiership of Boris Johnson while the UK was negotiating a Brexit agreement with the EU. The Speaker of the House of Commons had allowed debate on a bill against the government's wishes, and the government of the day was effectively in a minority on the most pressing parliamentary issue at the time. As such, there were rumours that the prime minister might advise the then-sovereign, Elizabeth II, to withhold assent on an unfavourable bill. The monarch would today not veto a bill, except on ministerial advice. Professor of constitutional law at King's College London Robert Blackburn suggested the monarch's granting of royal assent is now limited to due process and is a certification that a bill has passed all established parliamentary procedures, whereas Manchester University professor emeritus Rodney Brazier argued that a monarch can still refuse royal assent to a bill that "sought to subvert the democratic basis of the constitution". Brazier went on to admit doing such a thing would lead to "grave difficulties of definition" and it would be better if the monarch sought a different method of expressing their concern. The only situation in which royal assent could be denied would be if a bill had been passed by the legislative houses or house against the wishes of the cabinet and the royal assent stage offered the latter with a last-ditch opportunity to prevent the bill from becoming law.

==== Historical development ====
Originally, legislative power was exercised by the sovereign acting on the advice of the Curia regis, or Royal Council, in which senior magnates and clerics participated and which evolved into Parliament. In 1265, the Earl of Leicester irregularly called a full parliament without royal authorisation. Membership of the so-called Model Parliament, established in 1295 under Edward I, eventually came to be divided into two branches: bishops, abbots, earls, and barons formed the House of Lords, while the two knights from each shire and two burgesses from each borough led the House of Commons. The King would seek the advice and consent of both houses before making any law.

During Henry VI's reign, it became regular practice for the two houses to originate legislation in the form of bills, which would not become law unless the sovereign's assent was obtained, as the Sovereign was, and still remains, the enactor of laws. Hence, all acts include the clause "Be it enacted by the King's (Queen's) most Excellent Majesty, by and with the advice and consent of the Lords Spiritual and Temporal, and Commons, in this present Parliament assembled, and by the authority of the same, as follows...". The Parliament Acts 1911 and 1949 provide a second potential preamble if the House of Lords were to be excluded from the process.

The power of Parliament to pass bills was often thwarted by monarchs. Charles I dissolved Parliament in 1629, after it passed motions and bills critical of—and seeking to restrict—his arbitrary exercise of power. During the eleven years of personal rule that followed, Charles performed legally dubious actions such as raising taxes without Parliament's approval.

The form of the Coronation Oath taken by monarchs up to and including James I and Charles I included a promise (in Latin) to uphold the rightful laws and customs quas vulgus elegerit. (Note: The full text is as follows: Concedis justas leges et consuetudines esse tenendas? et promittis per te eas esse protegendas quas vulgus elegerit, secundum vires tuas? Respondebit, Concedo et promitto.) There was a controversy over the meaning of this phrase: the verb elegerit is ambiguous, representing either the future perfect ("which the common people shall have chosen"), or perfect subjunctive ("which the common people may have chosen"). Charles I, adopting the latter interpretation, considered himself committed only to uphold those laws and customs that already existed at the time of his coronation. The Long Parliament preferred the former translation, interpreting the oath as an undertaking to assent to any law passed by Parliament, as the representative of the "common people". The restoration Convention Parliament resolved the issue by removing the disputed phrase from the Oath.

After the Civil War, it was accepted that Parliament should be summoned to meet regularly, but it was still commonplace for monarchs to refuse royal assent to bills. The Sedition Act 1661 even made it a treasonable offence to suggest that Parliament had "a legislative power without the king". In 1678, Charles II withheld royal assent from a bill "for preserving the Peace of the Kingdom by raising the Militia, and continuing them in Duty for Two and Forty Days", suggesting that he, not Parliament, should control the militia. William III made comparatively liberal use of the royal veto, withholding assent from five public bills between 1692 and 1696. These were:

- The Judges Bill (vetoed 1692) would have regulated the fees charged by judges, and removed the right of the monarch to dismiss judges at will, stipulating that a judge should hold his commission "on good behaviour". One contemporary observer reported that William's veto was recommended by the judges themselves, concerned that the regulation of their fees would deprive them of a lucrative source of income.
- The Royal Mines Bill (vetoed 1692) would have clearly defined the monarch's right to seize any mine containing gold or silver. A similar bill was again passed by Parliament and given royal assent in the following year.
- The Triennial Bill (vetoed 1693) would have ensured Parliament would meet annually, and that no parliament could last longer than three years. A similar law, without the requirement for annual parliamentary sessions, was approved by the king in 1694 and became law.
- The Place Bill (vetoed 1694) would have prevented members of Parliament from accepting any office or employment under the Crown without standing for re-election. A similar provision was later approved by William as part of the Act of Settlement 1701.
- The Qualifications Bill (vetoed 1696) would have established property qualifications for members of Parliament.

Carafano suggests that William III considered the royal veto "his personal legislative tool". By contrast, the last Stuart monarch, Queen Anne, withheld her assent from a bill just once. On 11 March 1708, she vetoed the Scottish Militia Bill on the advice of her ministers. No monarch has since withheld royal assent from a bill passed by Parliament.

During the rule of the succeeding Hanoverian dynasty, power was gradually exercised more by Parliament and the government. The first Hanoverian monarch, George I, became heir presumptive and then king late in life. Speaking English as a second language and being at first unfamiliar with British politics and customs, he relied on his ministers to a greater extent than had previous monarchs. Later Hanoverian monarchs attempted to restore royal control over legislation: George III and George IV both openly opposed Catholic emancipation and asserted that to grant assent to a Catholic emancipation bill would violate the Coronation Oath, which required the sovereign to preserve and protect the established Church of England from papal domination, and would grant rights to individuals who were in league with a foreign power which did not recognise their legitimacy. George IV reluctantly granted his assent upon the advice of his ministers. Thus, as the concept of ministerial responsibility has evolved, the power to withhold royal assent has fallen into disuse, both in the United Kingdom and in the other Commonwealth realms.

In 1914, George V took legal advice on withholding royal assent from the Government of Ireland Bill; then highly contentious legislation that the Liberal government intended to push through Parliament by means of the Parliament Act 1911. He decided not to withhold assent without "convincing evidence that it would avert a national disaster, or at least have a tranquillising effect on the distracting conditions of the time".

It has been mooted that, in modern times, the government could advise the monarch to withhold royal assent, but that elected politicians should strive to avoid such a scenario.

===== Scotland =====
Royal assent is the final stage in the legislative process for acts of the Scottish Parliament. The process is governed by sections 28, 32, 33, and 35 of the Scotland Act 1998. After a bill has been passed, the Presiding Officer of the Scottish Parliament submits it to the monarch for royal assent after a four-week period, during which the Advocate General for Scotland, the Lord Advocate, the Attorney General or the Secretary of State for Scotland may refer the bill to the Supreme Court of the United Kingdom (prior to 1 October 2009, the Judicial Committee of the Privy Council) for review of its legality. Royal assent is signified by letters patent under the Great Seal of Scotland as set out in the Scottish Parliament (Letters Patent and Proclamations) Order 1999 (SI 1999/737) and of which notice is published in the London, Edinburgh, and Belfast Gazettes.

The authority of the Secretary of State for Scotland to prohibit the submission of a bill passed by the Scottish Parliament for royal assent was first used in January 2023 for the Gender Recognition Reform (Scotland) Bill.

===== Wales =====
Measures, which were the means by which the National Assembly for Wales passed legislation between 2006 and 2011, were assented to by Queen Elizabeth II by means of an Order in Council. Section 102 of the Government of Wales Act 2006 required the Clerk to the Assembly to present measures passed by the assembly after a four-week period during which the Counsel General for Wales or the Attorney General could refer the proposed measure to the Supreme Court for a decision as to whether the measure was within the assembly's legislative competence. Following the referendum held in March 2011, in which the majority voted for the assembly's law-making powers to be extended, measures were replaced by acts of the Assembly, which have since become known as acts of the Senedd.

===== Northern Ireland =====
Northern Ireland (Royal Assent to Bills) Order 1999
- Statutory Instrument
- Parliament of the United Kingdom
- Citation: SI 1999/664

Dates
- Made: 10 March 1999
- Commencement: 2 December 1999
Other legislation
Made under	Northern Ireland Act 1998

Text of statute as originally enacted

Under section 14 of the Northern Ireland Act 1998, a bill which has been approved by the Northern Ireland Assembly is presented to the monarch by the Secretary of State for Northern Ireland for royal assent after a four-week waiting period during which the Attorney General for Northern Ireland may refer the bill to the Supreme Court. Assent is given by means of letters patent in the following form set out in the Northern Ireland (Royal Assent to Bills) Order 1999 (SI 1999/664):

CHARLES THE THIRD by the Grace of God of the United Kingdom of Great Britain and Northern Ireland and of Our other Realms and Territories King, Head of the Commonwealth, Defender of the Faith, To the Members of the Northern Ireland Assembly GREETING:

WHEREAS you the Members of the Northern Ireland Assembly have passed a Bill the short title of which is set out in the Schedule hereto but the said Bill does not become an Act of the Northern Ireland Assembly without Our Royal Assent;

AND WHEREAS pursuant to the Northern Ireland Act 1998 the said Bill has been submitted to Us by [insert name of Secretary of State] one of Our Principal Secretaries of State for Our Royal Assent;

We have therefore caused these Our Letters Patent to be made and have signed them and by them We give Our Royal Assent to the said Bill COMMANDING [insert name of Clerk of the Crown for Northern Ireland] the Clerk of the Crown for Northern Ireland to seal these Our Letters with the Great Seal of Northern Ireland AND ALSO COMMANDING that these Our Letters be notified to the Presiding Officer of the Northern Ireland Assembly;

AND FINALLY WE declare that, in accordance with the Northern Ireland Act 1998, at the beginning of the day on which Our Royal Assent has been notified as aforesaid the said Bill shall become an Act of the Northern Ireland Assembly.

In Witness whereof We have caused these Our Letters to be made Patent

WITNESS Ourself at the day of in the year of Our Reign

By the King Himself Signed with His Own Hand.

Between 1922 and 1972, bills passed by the Parliament of Northern Ireland were passed to the Governor of Northern Ireland for royal assent under the Government of Ireland Act 1920, replacing the office of Lord Lieutenant.

===== Jersey and Guernsey =====
The Lieutenant Governors of the Bailiwick of Jersey and of the Bailiwick and Islands of Guernsey do not have the authority to grant assent, nor, as proxies, as the British Crown's representative, deliver assent, to legislation emanating from the respective legislatures of these islands. The States of Jersey Law 2005 abolishes the power of the Lieutenant Governor to directly impose a formal veto to a resolution of the States of Jersey.

The equivalent of the royal assent is formally granted or formally refused on the formal advice of the Committee of Council for the Affairs of Jersey and Guernsey in pursuance of Queen Elizabeth II's Order-in-Council of 22 February 1952. A recent example when the equivalent of royal assent was refused was in 2007, concerning reforms to the constitution of the Chief Pleas of Sark. (A revised version of the proposed reforms was subsequently given the equivalent of royal assent.)

===== Isle of Man =====
Special procedures apply to legislation passed by the Tynwald of the Isle of Man. Before the Lordship of the Island was purchased by the British Crown in 1765 (the Revestment), the assent of the Lord of Mann to a bill was signified by letter to the Governor. After 1765, the equivalent of royal assent was at first signified by the letter from the Secretary of State to the Governor; but, during the British Regency, the practice began of granting the equivalent of royal assent to Manx legislation by Orders in Council, which continues to this day, though limited to exceptional cases since 1981. That year the Royal Assent to Legislation (Isle of Man) Order 1981 delegated to the Lieutenant Governor the power to grant royal assent to bills passed by Tynwald. The Lieutenant Governor must refer any bill impacting on reserved powers (defence, foreign relations, nationality law, the relationship between the Island and the United Kingdom and any matters relating to the Monarch) to the British government for advice, on which he is required to act.

Since 1993, the Sodor and Man diocesan synod of the Church of England within the Province of York has had power to enact measures making provision "with respect to any matter concerning the Church of England in the Island". If approved by Tynwald, a measure "shall have the force and effect of an Act of Tynwald upon the Royal Assent thereto being announced to the Tynwald". Between the passing of the Church (Application of General Synod Measures) Act 1979 and 1993, the diocesan synod had similar powers, but limited to the extension to the Isle of Man of measures of the General Synod. Before 1994, the equivalent of royal assent was granted by Order in Council, as for a bill, but the power to grant the equivalent of royal assent to measures has now been delegated to the Lieutenant Governor by the Royal Assent to Sodor and Man Diocesan Synod Measures Order 1994. A measure does not require promulgation.

==== Relationship to royal consent ====
King's Consent and Prince's Consent are distinct from royal assent. They are required only for bills affecting the royal prerogative and the personal property and "personal interests" of the monarch, and are granted before parliament has debated or voted to pass a bill. They are internal parliamentary rules of procedure that could, in principle, be dispensed with by Parliament. Consent is always granted on the advice of the government; the monarch never takes the decision to withhold consent.

=== Other Commonwealth realms ===
In Commonwealth realms other than the UK, royal assent is granted or withheld either by the realm's sovereign or, more frequently, by the representative of the sovereign, the governor-general. In Australia and Canada, which are federations, assent in each state or province is granted or withheld by the relevant governor or lieutenant governor, respectively.

In Australia, in the special case of a bill proposing to amend the constitution, the bill is submitted to the electorate in a referendum and must receive majority support before receiving royal assent. All other bills passed normally by the Parliament become acts of Parliament once they have received royal assent.

In Solomon Islands and Tuvalu, royal assent may not be refused and constitutional provisions require it to be granted in a timely manner. In Antigua and Barbuda, Saint Lucia, and Saint Vincent and the Grenadines, the governor-general may not withhold assent if a bill has fulfilled all constitutional requirements. In Papua New Guinea, no royal assent is required for the passage of bills and legislation instead becomes effective on the certification of the speaker of the national parliament.

==== Irish Free State ====
In the Constitution of the Irish Free State, as enacted in 1922, the method of granting or withholding assent by the Governor-General was specified in Article 41 as matching that in Canada. Article 47, enabling petitions for referendums on bills, implicitly required seven days to elapse between the passing of a bill by the houses of the Oireachtas (the Dáil and Seanad) and the granting of assent by the Governor-General, in order to allow time to initiate a petition. Earlier assent to a bill could be requested by resolution of both houses that it was "necessary for the immediate preservation of the public peace, health or safety".

On 1 September 1923, the Public Safety (Emergency Powers) Act, 1923 was rushed through the Oireachtas to counter the previous day's Court of Appeal decision granting habeas corpus to republicans interned since the recent Irish Civil War. On 2 September, the Court of Appeal stated the act was not valid as the Governor-General had not waited seven days to grant assent and no early-assent resolution had been passed. The Attorney General argued unsuccessfully that once royal assent had been given, any earlier procedural errors were not justiciable. Later on 2 September, the Public Safety (Emergency Powers) (No. 2) Act, 1923 was rushed through the Oireachtas, replicating the previous day's act, but this time the requisite early-assent resolutions were made before the Governor-General gave his assent.

The Constitution (Amendment No. 10) Act 1928 deleted Article 47, abolishing the referendum provision and removing the seven-day waiting period for granting assent. Thus, for example, the Courts of Justice Act 1929 was passed by the Seanad on 17 December 1929 and granted royal assent on 20 December, without any early-assent resolutions. Fianna Fáil came to power after the 1932 general election and began removing monarchical elements from the constitution. The Constitution (Amendment No. 21) Act 1933 removed the Governor-General's right to withhold assent to bills. The Constitution (Amendment No. 27) Act 1936 abolished the Governor-General, removed all mention of the king, and provided that bills became law as soon as they were passed by the Dáil (the Seanad having been abolished earlier in 1936) and signed by the Ceann Comhairle.

==== Canada ====
For Canada, the lieutenant governors may defer assent to the governor general, who may defer assent to federal bills to the sovereign. If the governor general is unable to give assent, it can be done by a deputy, specifically a justice of the Supreme Court of Canada. Through Canadian history, royal assent has been withheld by a lieutenant governor approximately 90 times, the last occurring in Saskatchewan in 1961.

It is not actually necessary for the governor general to sign a bill passed by a legislature, the signature being merely an attestation. In each case, the parliament must be apprised of the granting of assent before the bill is considered to have become law. Two methods are available: the sovereign's representatives may grant assent in the presence of both houses of parliament. Alternatively, each house may be notified separately, usually by the speaker of that house. Both houses must be notified on the same day. Notice to the House of Commons while it is not in session may be given by way of publishing a special issue of the Journals of the House of Commons. The Senate must be sitting and the governor general's letter read aloud by the speaker.

== Development ==
While royal assent has not been withheld for a bill backed by the government in the United Kingdom since 1708, it has often been withheld in British colonies and former colonies by governors acting on royal instructions. In the United States Declaration of Independence, colonists complained that George III "has refused his Assent to Laws, the most wholesome and necessary for the public good [and] has forbidden his Governors to pass Laws of immediate and pressing importance, unless suspended in their operation till his Assent should be obtained; and when so suspended, he has utterly neglected to attend to them".

Since the Balfour Declaration of 1926 and the Statute of Westminster 1931, all the Commonwealth realms have been sovereign kingdoms, the monarch and governors-general acting solely on the advice of the local ministers, who generally maintain the support of the legislature and are the ones who secure the passage of bills. They, therefore, are unlikely to advise the sovereign, or their representative, to withhold assent. The power to withhold the royal assent was exercised by Alberta's Lieutenant Governor, John C. Bowen, in 1937, in respect of three bills passed in the legislature dominated by William Aberhart's Social Credit party. Two bills sought to put banks under the authority of the province, thereby interfering with the federal government's powers. The third, the Accurate News and Information Bill, purported to force newspapers to print government rebuttals to stories to which the provincial cabinet objected. The unconstitutionality of all three bills was later confirmed by the Supreme Court of Canada and by the Judicial Committee of the Privy Council.

In Australia, technical issues arose with the royal assent in both 1976 and 2001. In 1976, a bill originating in the House of Representatives was mistakenly submitted to the governor-general and assented to, but it was later discovered that it had not been passed by the Senate. The error arose because two bills of the same title had originated from the House. The governor-general revoked the first assent, before assenting to the bill which had actually passed the Senate and the House. The same procedure was followed to correct a similar error that arose in 2001.

== Ceremony ==
=== United Kingdom ===
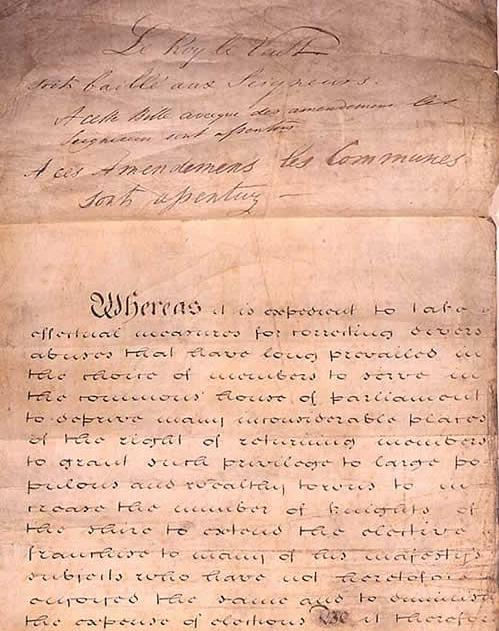
Start of the parchment roll of the Reform Act 1832, with the clerk's record of the royal assent of King William IV written above the bill, reading in full Le Roy le Veult. Soit baillé aux Seigneurs. A cette Bille avecque des amendemens les Seigneurs sont assentuz. A ces Amendemens les Communes sont assentuz.

In the United Kingdom, a bill is presented for royal assent after it has passed all the required stages in both the House of Commons and the House of Lords. Under the Parliament Acts 1911 and 1949, the House of Commons may, under certain circumstances, direct that a bill be presented for assent despite lack of passage by the House of Lords.

A list of all bills that have thus passed Parliament is drawn up by the Clerk of the Crown in Chancery; this list is then approved by the Clerk of the Parliaments. (The Prime Minister, other ministers, and Privy Counsellors do not normally have any involvement in drawing up the list.) The Clerk of the Crown then prepares letters patent listing all the relevant bills, which are then signed by the monarch and sealed.

Officially, assent is granted by the sovereign or by Lords Commissioners authorised to act by letters patent. Royal assent may be granted in parliament or outside parliament; in the latter case, each house must be separately notified before the bill takes effect.

The Clerk of the Parliaments, the chief official of the House of Lords, traditionally pronounces a formula in Anglo-Norman Law French, indicating the sovereign's decision. The granting of royal assent to a supply bill is indicated with the words "Le Roy remercie ses bons sujets, accepte leur benevolence, et ainsi le veult", translated as "The King thanks his good subjects, accepts their bounty, and so wills it." For other public or private bills, the formula is simply "Le Roy le veult" ("the King wills it"). For personal bills, the phrase is "Soit fait comme il est désiré" ("let it be done as it is desired"). The appropriate formula for withholding assent, not used since 1708, is the euphemistic "Le Roy s'avisera" ("the King will consider it").

When the sovereign is female, Le Roy is replaced by La Reyne.

Before the reign of Henry VIII, the sovereign always granted their assent in person. The sovereign, wearing the Crown, would be seated on the throne in the Lords chamber, surrounded by heralds and members of the royal court—a scene that nowadays is repeated only at the annual State Opening of Parliament. The Commons, led by their Speaker, would listen from the Bar of the Lords, just outside the chamber. The Clerk of the Parliaments presented the bills awaiting assent to the monarch, save that supply bills were traditionally brought up by the Speaker. The Clerk of the Crown, standing on the sovereign's right, then read aloud the titles of the bills (in earlier times, the entire text of the bills). The Clerk of the Parliaments, standing on the sovereign's left, responded by stating the appropriate Norman French formula.

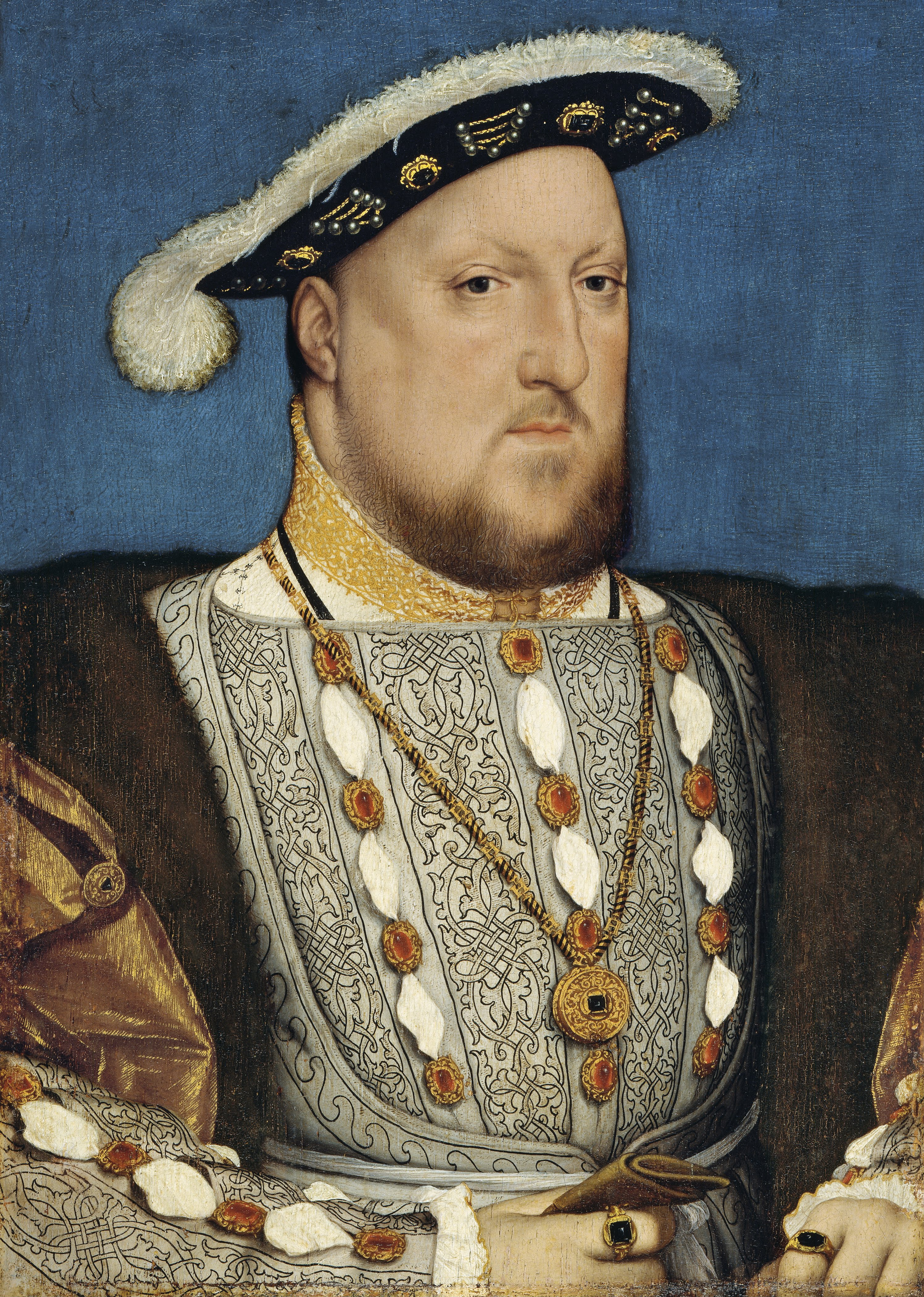
Henry VIII introduced a new method of granting royal assent.

A new device for granting assent was created during the reign of King Henry VIII. In 1542, Henry sought to execute his fifth wife, Catherine Howard, whom he accused of committing adultery; the execution was to be authorised not after a trial but by a bill of attainder, to which he would have to personally assent after listening to the entire text. Henry decided that "the repetition of so grievous a Story and the recital of so infamous a crime" in his presence "might reopen a Wound already closing in the Royal Bosom". Therefore, Parliament inserted a clause into the Act of Attainder, providing that assent granted by Commissioners "is and ever was and ever shall be, as good" as assent granted by the sovereign personally. The procedure was used only five times during the 16th century, but more often during the 17th and 18th centuries, especially when George III's health began to deteriorate. Queen Victoria became the last monarch to personally grant assent in 1854.

When granting assent by commission, the sovereign authorises three or more (normally five) lords who are privy counsellors to declare assent in their name. The Lords Commissioners, as the monarch's representatives are known, wear scarlet parliamentary robes and sit on a bench between the throne and the Woolsack. The Lords Reading Clerk reads the commission aloud; the senior commissioner then states, "My Lords, in obedience to His Majesty's Commands, and by virtue of the Commission which has been now read, We do declare and notify to you, the Lords Spiritual and Temporal and Commons in Parliament assembled, that His Majesty has given His Royal Assent to the several Acts in the Commission mentioned."

During the 1960s, the ceremony of assenting by commission was discontinued and is now only employed once a year, at the end of the annual parliamentary session. In 1960, the Gentleman Usher of the Black Rod arrived to summon the House of Commons during a heated debate and several members protested against the disruption by refusing to attend the ceremony. The debacle was repeated in 1965; this time, when the Speaker left the chair to go to the House of Lords, some members continued to make speeches. As a result, the Royal Assent Act 1967 was passed, creating an additional form for the granting of royal assent. As the attorney-general explained, "there has been a good deal of resentment not only at the loss of Parliamentary time that has been involved but at the breaking of the thread of a possibly eloquent speech and the disruption of a debate that may be caused."

Under the Royal Assent Act 1967, royal assent can be granted by the sovereign in writing, by means of letters patent, that are presented to the presiding officer of each house of Parliament. Then, the presiding officer makes a formal, but simple statement to the house, acquainting each house that royal assent has been granted to the acts mentioned. Thus, unlike the granting of royal assent by the monarch in person or by royal commissioners, the method created by the Royal Assent Act 1967 does not require both houses to meet jointly for the purpose of receiving the notice of royal assent. The standard text of the letters patent is set out in the Crown Office (Forms and Proclamations Rules) Order 1992 (SI 1992/1730), with minor amendments in 2000. In practice this remains the standard method, a fact that is belied by the wording of the letters patent for the appointment of the Royal Commissioners and by the wording of the letters patent for the granting of royal assent in writing under the 1967 Act ("... And forasmuch as We cannot at this time be present in the Higher House of Our said Parliament being the accustomed place for giving Our Royal Assent...").

Independently of the method used to signify royal assent, it is the responsibility of the Clerk of the Parliaments, once the assent has been duly notified to both houses, not only to endorse the act in the name of the monarch with the formal Norman French formula, but to certify that assent has been granted. The Clerk signs one authentic copy of the bill and inserts the date (in English) on which the assent was notified to the two houses after the title of the act.

=== Australia and New Zealand ===
In Australia, the formal ceremony of granting assent in parliament has not been regularly used since the early 20th century. Today, the bill is sent to the governor's or the governor-general's residence by the house in which it originated. The governor-general then signs the bill, and notifies the president of the Senate and the speaker of the House of Representatives, who notify their respective houses of the governor-general's action. A similar practice is followed in New Zealand, where the governor-general has not granted the royal assent in person in parliament since 1875.

=== Canada ===
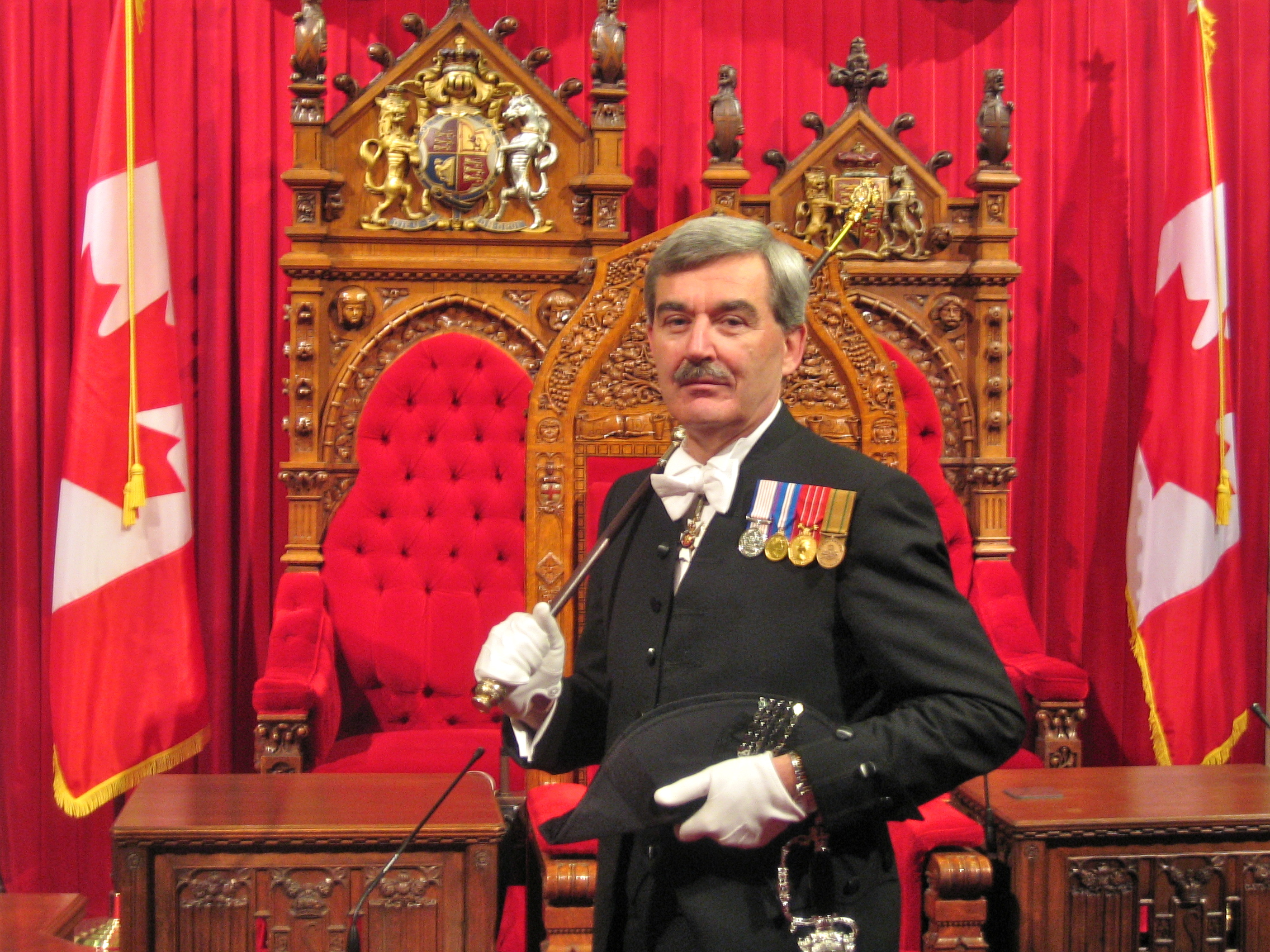
Kevin S. MacLeod as Usher of the Black Rod in 2009. Black Rod is a key element of the royal assent ceremony in Canada as in Britain.

In Canada, the traditional ceremony for granting assent in Parliament is still regularly used, long after it had been discontinued in the United Kingdom and other Commonwealth realms. One result, conceived as part of a string of acts intended to demonstrate Canada's status as an independent realm, was that King George VI personally assented to nine bills of the Canadian Parliament during his tour of Canada in 1939—85 years after his great-grandmother, Queen Victoria, had last granted royal assent personally in the United Kingdom. Under the Royal Assent Act, 2002, the alternative practice of granting assent in writing, with each house being notified separately, was brought into force. The speaker of the Senate or a representative reads to the senators the letters from the governor general regarding the written declaration of royal assent. As the act provides, royal assent is to be signified—by the governor general or by a deputy, usually a Justice of the Supreme Court.

The royal assent ceremony takes place in the Senate, as the sovereign is traditionally barred from the House of Commons. On the day of the event, the speaker of the Senate will read to the chamber a notice from the secretary to the governor general indicating when the viceroy or a deputy thereof will arrive. The Senate thereafter cannot adjourn until after the ceremony. The speaker moves to sit beside the throne. The mace bearer, with mace in hand, stands adjacent to him or her, and the governor general enters to take the speaker's chair.

The usher of the Black Rod is then commanded by the speaker to summon the members of Parliament, who follow black rod back to the Senate, the sergeant-at-arms carrying the mace of the House of Commons. In the Senate, those from the Commons stand behind the bar, while black rod proceeds to stand next to the governor general, who then nods their head to signify royal assent to the presented bills (which do not include supply bills). Once the list of bills is complete, the clerk of the Senate states: "in his [or her] majesty's name, his [or her] excellency the governor general [or the deputy] doth assent to these bills."

If there are any supply bills to receive royal assent, the speaker of the House of Commons will read their titles and the Senate clerk repeats them to the governor general, who nods their head to communicate royal assent. When these bills have all been assented to, the clerk of the Senate recites "in his [or her] majesty's name, his [or her] excellency the governor general [or the deputy] thanks his [or her] loyal subjects, accepts their benevolence, and assents to these bills." The governor general or their deputy then depart Parliament.

== Other countries ==
In some monarchies—such as Belgium, Denmark, Japan, Malaysia, the Netherlands, Norway, Spain, and Thailand—promulgation is required as well as royal assent. In Sweden, the monarch was removed from the process in 1975; instead, the government (i.e. the cabinet chaired by the Prime Minister) officially promulgates laws. In both cases, the process of assent and promulgation is usually a formality, whether by constitutional convention or by an explicit provision of the constitution.

=== Belgium ===
In Article 109 of the constitution: "The King sanctions and promulgates laws". In Belgium, the royal assent is called sanction royale / koninklijke bekrachtiging (Royal Sanction), and is granted by the King signing the proposed statute (and a minister countersigning it). The Belgian constitution requires a theoretically possible refusal of royal sanction to be countersigned—as any other act of the monarch—by a minister responsible before the House of Representatives. The monarch promulgates the law, meaning that he or she formally orders that the law be officially published and executed. In 1990, when King Baudouin advised his cabinet he could not, in conscience, sign a bill decriminalising abortion (a refusal patently not covered by a responsible minister), the Council of Ministers, at the King's own request, declared Baudouin incapable of exercising his powers. In accordance with the Belgian constitution, upon the declaration of the Sovereign's incapacity, the Council of Ministers assumed the powers of the head of state until parliament could rule on the King's incapacity and appoint a regent. The bill was then assented to by all members of the Council of Ministers "on behalf of the Belgian People". In a joint meeting, both houses of parliament declared the King capable of exercising his powers again the next day.

=== Japan ===
Articles 6 and 7 of the Constitution of Japan mention the decisions of the parliament that require the approval of the Emperor. These are some of the so-called "acts of state" (国事行為, kokuji-kōi), and according to Article 3 of the Constitution, acts of state require the advice and approval of the Cabinet, which is the responsibility of the Cabinet.

=== Jordan ===
The constitution of Jordan grants its monarch the right to withhold assent to laws passed by its parliament. Article 93 of that document gives the Jordanian Sovereign six months to sign or veto any legislation sent to him from the National Assembly. If he vetoes it within that timeframe, the assembly may override his veto by a two-thirds vote of both houses. Otherwise, the law does not go into effect, but it may be reconsidered in the next session of the assembly. If the monarch fails to act within six months of the bill being presented to him, it becomes law without his signature.

=== Luxembourg ===
While Article 34 of the constitution of Luxembourg formerly required the grand duke or duchess to sanction and promulgate a new law for it to take effect, the required sanction was removed in 2008, after Grand Duke Henri informed his prime minister that he could not in good conscience assent to a bill to permit euthanasia in the country. The subsequent constitutional amendment removed the need for assent while retaining the need for the Grand Duke to promulgate new laws. The Grand-Duke's signature is still required, but does not imply assent, only promulgation (announcement that the law has been enacted by Parliament). The Grand-Duke did sign the Euthanasia Act under this new constitutional arrangement.

=== Malaysia ===
Article 66(3) of the Federal Constitution of Malaysia provides that after a bill was passed by both Houses of Parliament, it shall be presented to the Yang di-Pertuan Agong (King of Malaysia) for his assent before being gazetted in order to become law. Since 1983, if a bill does not received royal assent within 30 days after it was presented to the King, the bill will automatically become law as per Article 66(4A) of the Constitution. Likewise, since 1994, if a Ruler of a Malaysian states does not grant his assent to a bill passed by the state Legislature within the 30 days period, the bill will automatically become law. As of 2016, the only federal law that failed to receive royal assent but still become law as per Article 66(4A) is the National Security Council Act 2016.

=== Norway ===
Articles 77–79 of the Norwegian constitution specifically grant the monarch of Norway the right to withhold royal assent from any bill passed by the Storting. Should the monarch ever choose to exercise this privilege, Article 79 provides a means by which his veto may be over-ridden: "When two Stortings with one election and at least two sessions of the Storting between them have passed the same law unchanged without the Storting having passed a divergent law, and it then is submitted to the king with the petition that His Majesty will not refuse his assent to a law which the Storting after thorough consideration finds to be beneficial, it shall become law even if the king does not give his assent before the Storting goes into recess." This is called a "delaying veto", as there is no mechanism for the Storting to override the lack of royal assent immediately, instead overriding it by passing the same law a third time.

The measure of withholding assent has not been used officially since the dissolution of the union between Norway and Sweden in 1905, but there have been cases where the king has intimated his disapproval of a suggested law. The last case was in 2008, when the Storting wanted to remove article 4 of the Constitution, which stated that the king must be an Evangelical Lutheran Christian. In discussion with parliamentarians, king Harald V said that he felt that the king should be a member of the Norwegian people's church. Likely because the article involved the king on a personal level, and due to the good working relations between the king and the Storting, the parliamentarians decided not to press the issue and changed the wording of the article to reflect the king's opinion, rather than removing the article outright.

=== Spain ===
In Part II of the 1978 Spanish constitution, among provisions concerning the Crown, Article 62(a) invests the sanction (i.e. royal assent) and promulgation of laws with the monarch of Spain. Chapter 2 of Part III, concerning the Drafting of Bills, outlines the method by which bills are passed. According to Article 91, the monarch shall give their assent and promulgate the new law within fifteen days of passage of a bill by the Cortes Generales. Article 92 invests the monarch with the right to call for a referendum, on the advice of the president of the government (commonly referred to in English as the prime minister) and the authorisation of the cortes.

No constitutional provision allows the monarch to directly veto legislation, but neither does the constitution prohibit the Sovereign from withholding royal assent. When the Spanish media asked King Juan Carlos I if he would endorse the bill legalising same-sex marriages, he answered: "Soy el Rey de España y no el de Bélgica" ("I am the King of Spain and not that of Belgium")—a reference to King Baudouin of Belgium, who had refused to sign the Belgian law legalising abortion. The King gave royal assent to Law 13/2005 on 1 July 2005; the law was gazetted in the Boletín Oficial del Estado on 2 July and came into effect on 3 July 2005.

=== Thailand ===
The powers of the National Assembly are enshrined in Chapter 6, Part 7 of the 2007 Constitution of Thailand. The main powers of the National Assembly are its legislative powers. The procedure for an enactment of a bill is as follows:

- A bill can be introduced to the National Assembly for consideration by the Cabinet of Thailand; by a minimum of twenty members of the House of Representatives; by a court (the judiciary); by constitutional independent organs (but only in respect to laws that concern that organization); and by persons who have the right to vote submitting a petition of no fewer than ten thousand in number (a form of direct democracy). If the bill is a money bill its introduction can only be made with the endorsement of the prime minister.
- The bill is then introduced to the House of Representative for debate, amendment, and vote. When the House of Representatives has considered the bill and passed a resolution approving it, the House of Representatives shall submit the bill to the Senate. The Senate must finish the consideration of such bill within 60 days, unless it is a money bill, when consideration must be finished within 30 days.
- After the Senate has finished consideration of a bill, and if it agrees with the House of Representatives, the bill will then proceed to the next stage. If the Senate disagrees with the House of Representatives, then the bill will be withheld and returned to the House of Representatives. If there is an amendment, the amended bill will then be returned to the House of Representatives. If the House of Representatives approves the amendment, the bill will proceed to the next stage. In other cases, each house will appoint representatives (who may or may not be members of the Assembly) in equal number (as may be fixed by the House of Representatives), to constitute a joint committee to consider the bill. The joint committee will then prepare a report and resubmit the bill to both houses. If both houses approve the bill already considered by the joint committee, the bill will proceed to the next stage. If either house disapproves it, the bill will be withheld.
- After a bill has been approved by the National Assembly, the prime minister presents it to the monarch for royal assent within 20 days from the date of the receipt of the bill from the National Assembly. It shall come into force upon its publication in the Royal Gazette.
- If the monarch refuses royal assent, by withholding his signature to a bill and either returns it to the National Assembly or does not return it within 90 days, (a veto), the National Assembly must re-deliberate that bill. If the National Assembly resolves to reaffirm the bill with the vote of not less than two-thirds of the total number of existing members of both houses, the prime minister shall again present the bill to the monarch for signature. If the monarch still does not sign and return the bill within 30 days, the prime minister can cause the bill to be promulgated as an act in the Royal Gazette as if the monarch had signed it. This gives the National Assembly the power to overturn a royal veto.

=== Tonga ===
Articles 41 and 68 of the constitution empower the King to withhold royal assent from bills adopted by the Legislative Assembly. In 2010, the kingdom moved towards greater democracy, with King George Tupou V saying that he would be guided by his prime minister in the exercising of his powers. Nonetheless, this does not preclude an independent royal decision to exercise a right of veto. In November 2011, the assembly adopted an Arms and Ammunitions (Amendment) Bill, which reduced the possible criminal sentences for the illicit possession of firearms. The bill was adopted by ten votes to eight. Two members of the assembly had recently been charged with the illicit possession of firearms. The Prime Minister, Lord Tuʻivakanō, voted in favour of the amendment. Members of the opposition denounced the bill and asked the King to veto it, which he did in December.

== See also ==
- Le Roy le veult
- Royal prerogative
