= Court of First Fruits and Tenths =

United Kingdom legislation

First Fruits and Tenths Act 1534
- Act of Parliament
- Parliament of England
- Long title: An Act concerning the Payments of First-fruits of all Dignities, Benefices and Promotions Spiritual; and also concerning one annual Pension of the tenth Part of all the Possessions of the Church, Spiritual and Temporal, granted to the King's Highness and his Heirs.
- Citation: 26 Hen. 8. c. 3
- Territorial extent: England and Wales; Isle of Man

Dates
- Royal assent: 18 December 1534
- Commencement: 3 November 1534 (Note: Start of session.)
- Repealed: England and Wales: 15 July 1926; Isle of Man: 25 July 1991

Other legislation
- Amended by: First Fruits and Tenths Act 1535; First Fruits, etc. Act 1555; Statute Law Revision Act 1888
- Repealed by: England and Wales: First Fruits and Tenths Measure 1926; Isle of Man: Statute Law Revision (Isle of Man) Act 1991
- Relates to: First Fruits and Tenths (No. 2) Act 1534

Status: Repealed

Text of statute as originally enacted

First Fruits and Tenths (No. 2) Act 1534
- Act of Parliament
- Parliament of England
- Long title: An Act that no Farmers of Spiritual Persons shall be compelled or charged to pay for their Leaser's First Fruits, or Year's Pension of the Tenth, granted to the King's Highness.
- Citation: 26 Hen. 8. c. 17
- Territorial extent: England and Wales; Isle of Man

Dates
- Royal assent: 18 December 1534
- Commencement: 3 November 1534
- Repealed: England and Wales: 15 July 1926; Isle of Man: Statute Law Revision (Isle of Man) Act 1991

Other legislation
- Repealed by: England and Wales: First Fruits and Tenths Measure 1926; Isle of Man: Statute Law Revision (Isle of Man) Act 1991
- Relates to: First Fruits and Tenths Act 1534; First Fruits and Tenths Act 1535; First Fruits, etc. Act 1555

Status: Repealed

Text of statute as originally enacted

First Fruits and Tenths Act 1535
- Act of Parliament
- Parliament of England
- Long title: An Act for Discharge of Payment of the Tenth in that Year in which they pay their First Fruits.
- Citation: 27 Hen. 8. c. 8
- Territorial extent: England and Wales; Isle of Man

Dates
- Royal assent: 14 April 1536
- Commencement: 1 May 1536 (Note: Section 1.)
- Repealed: England and Wales: 15 July 1926; Isle of Man: Statute Law Revision (Isle of Man) Act 1991

Other legislation
- Amends: First Fruits and Tenths Act 1534
- Repealed by: England and Wales: First Fruits and Tenths Measure 1926; Isle of Man: Statute Law Revision (Isle of Man) Act 1991
- Relates to: First Fruits and Tenths (No. 2) Act 1534; First Fruits, etc. Act 1555

Status: Repealed

Text of statute as originally enacted

First Fruits, etc. Act 1555
- Act of Parliament
- Parliament of England
- Long title: An Act for the Extinguishment of the First Fruits, and touching Order and Disposition of the Tenths of Spiritual and Ecclesiastical Promotions, and of Rectories and Parsonages Impropriate, remaining in the Queen's Majesty's Hands.
- Citation: 2 & 3 Ph. & M. c. 4
- Territorial extent: England and Wales

Dates
- Royal assent: 9 December 1555
- Commencement: 21 October 1555
- Repealed: 23 January 1559

Other legislation
- Amends: First Fruits and Tenths Act 1534
- Repealed by: First Fruits and Tenths Act 1558
- Relates to: First Fruits and Tenths Act 1535; First Fruits and Tenths (No. 2) Act 1534

Status: Repealed

Text of statute as originally enacted

First Fruits and Tenths Act 1558
- Act of Parliament
- Parliament of England
- Long title: An Act for the Restitution of the First Fruits, and Tenths and Rents reserved Nomine Decime, and of Parsonages Impropriate, to the Imperial Crown of this Realm.
- Citation: 1 Eliz. 1. c. 4
- Territorial extent: England and Wales

Dates
- Royal assent: 8 May 1559
- Commencement: 23 January 1559
- Repealed: 30 July 1948

Other legislation
- Repeals/revokes: First Fruits, etc. Act 1555
- Repealed by: Statute Law Revision Act 1863; First Fruits and Tenths Measure 1926; Statute Law Revision Act 1948

Status: Repealed

Text of statute as originally enacted

First Fruits and Tenths was a form of tax on clergy taking up a benefice or ecclesiastical position in Great Britain. The Court of First Fruits and Tenths was established in 1540 to collect from clerical benefices certain moneys that had previously been sent to Rome.

Clergy had to pay a portion of their first year's income (known as annates) and a tenth of their revenue annually thereafter. Originally, the money was paid to the papacy, but Henry VIII's 1534 statute diverted the money to the English Crown as part of his campaign to pressure the Pope into granting him an annulment of his marriage with Catherine of Aragon.

The Appointment of Bishops Act 1533 (25 Hen. 8. c. 20) allowed taxes on first fruits and tenths (of benefice’s income) to be transferred from the Pope to the King. Thomas Cromwell set up a special financial administration for these revenues. Following his removal from office, a separate administration was established: the Court of First Fruits and Tenths. In 1554 the court was dissolved, and responsibility for administration of these revenues passed to the Office of First Fruits and Tenths, a department of the Exchequer. During the 18th century, these payments formed the basis of Queen Anne's Bounty.

== Substance and procedure ==
First-fruits (annates) and tenths (decimae) originally formed part of the revenue paid by the clergy to the papal exchequer. The former consist of the first whole year's profit of all spiritual preferments, the latter of one-tenth of their annual profits after the first year.

The proceedings of the court relate to a variety of aspects of the collection of these dues for the Crown and include, for example, accountings, sheriffs' returns to writs concerning livings and their incumbents and appearances and hearings in cases of first fruits.

The income derived from first-fruits and tenths was annexed to the revenue of the Crown by the First Fruits and Tenths Act 1534 (26 Hen. 8. c. 3), and so continued until 1703. The Court of First Fruits and Tenths was subsequently subsumed into the Exchequer Office of First Fruits and Tenths in 1554.

Beginning in 1703, Queen Anne's Bounty was the name applied to a perpetual fund of first-fruits and tenths granted by a charter of Queen Anne and confirmed by the Queen Anne's Bounty Act 1703 (2 & 3 Ann. c. 20), for the augmentation of the livings of the poorer Anglican clergy. In accordance with the provisions of two acts of 1706, Queen Anne's Bounty Act 1706 (6 Ann. c. 24); and Taxation (No. 5) Act 1706 (6 Ann. c. 27), about 3,900 poor livings under the annual value of £50 were discharged from first-fruits and tenths.

== See also ==
- Annates
- First Fruits
