= John Bacon (clerk) =

- Born: 1738
- Died: 1816 (aged 77–78); London
- Occupation: Clerk
- Church: Church of England

John Bacon F.S.A. (1738–1816), was a British clerk and editor, who edited a revised edition of John Ecton's Thesaurus. He spent much of his working life in the first-fruits department of the office Queen Anne's Bounty in the Temple, London.

== Career ==
His first appointment at the Temple was as junior clerk to the deputy remembrancer. Bacon rose to become the senior clerk in 1778 and the receiver in 1782, a position which he held until 1816. With these offices he combined the duties of treasurer to the Corporation of the Sons of the Clergy. He obtained the leasehold interest, under the Dean of St. Paul's Cathedral and chapter of St. Paul's, of the manor of Whetstone, or Friern Barnet, and when the Land Tax Redemption Act authorised them to effect a sale of their landed property, he purchased the reversion of the manor-house and the whole of their estate in the parish of Friern Barnet. A description of the house and the curiosities which it contained may be found in Lysons's 'Environs of London,' ii. 22.

Bacon was appointed a fellow of the Society of Arts (later the Royal Society of Arts) in 1774.

His edition of John Ecton's Liber regis, vel thesaurus rerum ecclesiasticarum, a detailed account of the valuations of all ecclesiastical benefices which were charged with first fruits and tenths, was published in 1786. Severe comments were made at that time in the 'Gentleman's Magazine' on the omission of any mention in the title-page or the preface of the previous compilation of Ecton.

== Family ==
Bacon married Mary Linnell, daughter of John Linnel at St George Hanover Square in 1773.

He died in the manor-house of Friern Barnet on 26 February 1816 aged 78, and was buried in a small vault on the outside of St James the Great, Friern Barnet. His tombstone in the churchyard records his second son, Major Francis D'Arcy Bacon (1778–1842) and his son's wife. His only daughter, Maria, was married in 1802 to Sir William Johnston, of that ilk, Aberdeenshire.
