= Annates =

Medieval church tax

Annates (/ˈæneɪts/ or /ˈænəts/; Latin: annatae, from annus, "year") were a payment from the recipient of an ecclesiastical benefice to the collating authorities. Eventually, they consisted of half or the whole of the first year's profits of a benefice; after the appropriation of the right of collation by the Roman see, they were paid to the papal treasury, ostensibly as a proffered contribution to the church. They were also known as the "first fruits" (primitiae), a religious offering which dates back to earlier Greek, Roman, and Hebrew religions.

== History ==
This custom was of only gradual growth. At a very early period, bishops who received episcopal consecration in Rome were wont to present gifts to the various ecclesiastical authorities concerned. Out of this custom, there grew up a prescriptive right to such gifts.

The jus deportuum, annalia or annatae, was originally the right of the bishop to claim the first year's profits of the living from a newly inducted incumbent, of which the first mention is found under Pope Honorius III (d. 1227), but which had its origin in a custom, dating from the 6th century, by which those ordained to ecclesiastical offices paid a fee or tax to the ordaining bishop. Originally, in the thirteenth and fourteenth centuries, annatæ or annalia, signified only the first-fruits of those lesser benefices of which the pope had reserved the patronage to himself, and granted outside of the consistory. It was from these claims that the papal annates, in the strict sense, in course of time developed. These accrued to the Apostolic Camera (Papal treasury).

The earliest records show the annata to have been, sometimes a privilege conceded to the bishop for a term of years, sometimes a right based on immemorial precedent. In course of time the popes, under stress of financial crises, claimed the privilege for themselves, though at first only temporarily. Thus, in 1305, Pope Clement V claimed the first-fruits of all vacant benefices in England, and in 1319 Pope John XXII those of all Christendom vacated within the next two years. In those cases the rights of the bishops were frankly usurped by the Holy See, now regarded as the ultimate source of the episcopal jurisdiction.

== Classification ==
These annates may be divided broadly into four classes, though the chief features are common to all:

1. the servitia communia or servitia Camerae Papae: a payment by an abbot, bishop, or archbishop, due upon his induction, of the anticipated revenue of the next year in his new benefice. This payment is traceable to the oblatio paid to the pope when consecrating bishops as metropolitans or patriarchs. When, in the middle of the 13th century, the consecration of bishops became established as the sole right of the pope, the oblations of all bishops of the West were received by him; by the close of the 14th century, these became fixed at one year's revenue. (Note: For cases see du Cange and Giesler.)
2. the jus deportuum, fructus medii temporis, or annalia: the annates due to the bishop or archbishop for benefices under his control but "reserved" by the church for the maintenance of the Papacy.
3. the quindennia: the annates of benefices attached to communities or corporations, which—under a 1469 bull of Paul II—were not paid at every presentation but instead offered every fifteen years.
4. the servitia minuta: a small additional payment eventually added to other annates as a kind of notarial fee.

== National variation ==
It must not be supposed that this system ever was worked with absolute uniformity and completeness throughout the various parts of Catholic Christendom. There were continual disagreements and disputes: the central authorities endeavouring to maintain and extend this most important of their financial schemes, and the subordinate ecclesiastics doing their best to get rid of the impost altogether or to transmute it into some less objectionable form. The easy expedient of rewarding the officials of the Curia and increasing the papal revenue by "reserving" more and more benefices was met by repeated protests, such as that of the bishops and barons of England (the chief sufferers), headed by Robert Grosseteste of Lincoln, at the council of Lyons in 1245. (Note: Durandus represents contemporary clerical hostile opinion and attacks the corruptions of the officials of the Curia.) The subject frequently became one of national interest, on account of the alarming amount of specie which was thus drained away, and hence numerous enactments exist in regard to it by the various national governments.

=== Britain ===
In the Kingdom of England, which included Wales after the English conquest of 1277 to 1283, the annates were originally paid for the most part to the archbishop of Canterbury, but were claimed for three years by John XXII in the early 14th century and permanently usurped by his successors. The payments were originally governed by a valuation made by Walter Suffield, the bishop of Norwich, for Innocent IV in 1254; this was emended by Nicholas III in 1292. In 1531 or 1532, the total payments comprised around £3,000 a year and Henry VIII prohibited their collection. In 1534, Thomas Cromwell obtained from parliament the Act in Restraint of Annates, which restored the annates as a payment owed to the Crown. A new valuation was established by the commissioners who wrote the King's Books (Liber Regis) in 1535. In February 1704, they were granted by Queen Anne to the assistance of the poorer clergy, a scheme since known as "Queen Anne's Bounty". The 1535 valuations were still in use in 1704, and their continued use was inherent in the Queen Anne's Bounty Act 1703 (2 & 3 Ann. c 20), the act of Parliament setting up Queen Anne's Bounty; consequently the 'first fruits' payments did not increase to reflect the true value of livings; by 1837, the Ecclesiastical Commissioners reported first fruits to bring in £4,000–5,000 a year whereas church income was around £3m a year and the true value of first fruits would therefore have been over £150,000 a year.

Ann Act 1672 (Note: The citation of this act by this short title was authorised by section 2 of, and schedule 2 to, the Statute Law Revision (Scotland) Act 1964.)
- Act of Parliament
- Parliament of Scotland
- Long title: Act for the Ann due to the Executors of Bishopes and Ministers.
- Citation: 1672 c. 24 [12mo ed: c. 13]
- Territorial extent: Scotland

Dates
- Royal assent: 23 August 1672
- Commencement: 12 June 1672 (Note: Start of session.)
- Repealed: 28 November 2004 (Note: The Abolition of Feudal Tenure etc. (Scotland) Act 2000 (Commencement No. 2) (Appointed Day) Order 2003 (SSI 2003/456).)
Other legislation
Amended by	Statute Law Revision (Scotland) Act 1906
Repealed by	Abolition of Feudal Tenure etc. (Scotland) Act 2000

Status: Repealed

Revised text of statute as amended

Text of the Ann Act 1672 as in force today (including any amendments) within the United Kingdom, from legislation.gov.uk.

In Scotland, the annat or ann is defined by the Ann Act 1672 (c. 24) as half a year's stipend allowed to the executors of a minister of the Church of Scotland above what was due to him at the time of his death. This is neither assignable by the clergyman during his life nor can it be seized by his creditors.

=== France ===
In France, in spite of royal edicts (Note: As those under Charles VI, Charles VII, Louis XI, and Henry II.) and even denunciations of the Sorbonne, at least the custom of paying the servitia communia held its ground until the infamous decree of August 4 during the French Revolution in 1789.

=== Germany ===
In Germany, it was decided by the concordat of Constance, in 1418, that bishoprics and abbacies should pay the servitia according to the valuation of the Roman chancery in two half-yearly instalments. Those reserved benefices only were to pay the annalia which were rated above twenty-four gold florins; and as none were so rated, whatever their annual value may have been, the annalia fell into disuse. A similar convenient fiction also led to their practical abrogation in France, Spain and Belgium. The council of Basel (1431–1443) wished to abolish the servitia, but the concordat of Vienna (1448) confirmed the Constance decision. Politically, the collection was opposed by Martin Luther his 1520 To the Christian Nobility of the German Nation, in which he wrote:

Every prince, nobleman and city should boldly forbid their subjects to pay the annates to Rome and should abolish them entirely; for the pope has broken the compact, and made the annates a robbery, to the injury and shame of the whole German nation. He gives them to his friends, sells them for large amounts of money, and uses them to endow offices. He has thus lost his right to them, and deserves punishment.

The practice of collecting servitia continued through the Reformation, in spite of the efforts of the congress of Ems (1786) to alter it, still remains nominally in force. As a matter of fact, however, the revolution caused by the secularization of the ecclesiastical states in 1803 practically put an end to the system, and the servitia have either been commuted via gratiae to a moderate fixed sum under particular concordats, or are the subject of separate negotiation with each bishop on his appointment. In Prussia, where the bishops received salaries as state officials, the payment was made by the government.

=== Poland ===
Annates were abolished in 1865 by Alexander II.

== See also ==
- Index of Vatican City-related articles
- Kickback
- Papal States
- Secretariat for the Economy

== Bibliography ==
- Baynes, T. S., ed. (1878), "Annates" , Encyclopædia Britannica, vol. 2 (9th ed.), New York: Charles Scribner's Sons, pp. 61–62

Attribution
