= List of acts of the Parliament of England from 1665 =

This is a list of acts of the Parliament of England for the year 1665.

For acts passed during the period 1707–1800, see the list of acts of the Parliament of Great Britain. See also the list of acts of the Parliament of Scotland, and the list of acts of the Parliament of Ireland.

For acts passed from 1801 onwards, see the list of acts of the Parliament of the United Kingdom. For acts of the devolved parliaments and assemblies in the United Kingdom, see the list of acts of the Scottish Parliament, the list of acts of the Northern Ireland Assembly, and the list of acts and measures of Senedd Cymru; see also the list of acts of the Parliament of Northern Ireland.

For medieval statutes, etc. that are not considered to be acts of Parliament, see the list of English statutes.

See also the List of ordinances and acts of the Parliament of England, 1642–1660 for ordinances and acts passed by the Long Parliament and other bodies without royal assent, and which were not considered to be valid legislation following the Restoration in 1660.

The number shown after each act's title is its chapter number. Acts are cited using this number, preceded by the years of the reign during which the relevant parliamentary session was held; thus the Union with Ireland Act 1800 is cited as "39 & 40 Geo. 3. c. 67", meaning the 67th act passed during the session that started in the 39th year of the reign of George III and which finished in the 40th year of that reign. The modern convention is to use Arabic numerals in citations (thus "41 Geo. 3" rather than "41 Geo. III"). Acts of the last session of the Parliament of Great Britain and the first session of the Parliament of the United Kingdom are both cited as "41 Geo. 3".

Acts passed by the Parliament of England did not have a short title; however, some of these acts have subsequently been given a short title by acts of the Parliament of the United Kingdom, such as the Short Titles Act 1896 (59 & 60 Vict. c. 14).

Acts passed by the Parliament of England were deemed to have come into effect on the first day of the session in which they were passed. Because of this, the years given in the list below may in fact be the year before a particular act was passed.

== 17 Cha. 2 ==
The fifth session of the 2nd Parliament of King Charles II (the 'Cavalier Parliament') which met from 9 October 1665 until 31 October 1665.

This parliament was held at Oxford due to the Great Plague of London.

This session was also traditionally cited as 17 Car. 2 (Chronological Table of the Statutes), 17 Chas. 2 or 17 C. 2.

=== Public acts ===
Short title	Citation	Royal assent
Long title
Taxation Act 1665 (repealed)	17 Cha. 2. c. 1	31 October 1665
An Act for granting the summe of Twelve hundred and fiftie thousand pounds to the Kings Majestie for His present further Supply. (Repealed by Statute Law Revision Act 1863 (26 & 27 Vict. c. 125))
Nonconformists Act 1665 or the Five Mile Act or the Oxford Act (repealed)	17 Cha. 2. c. 2	31 October 1665
An Act for restraining Non-Conformists from inhabiting in Corporations. (Repealed by Places of Religious Worship Act 1812 (52 Geo. 3. c. 155))
Augmentation of Benefices Act 1665 (repealed)	17 Cha. 2. c. 3	31 October 1665
An Act for uniting Churches in Cittyes and Townes Corporate. (Repealed by Pluralities Act 1838 (1 & 2 Vict. c. 106) and Charities Act 1960 (8 & 9 Eliz. 2. c. 58))
Licensing of the Press Act 1665 (repealed)	17 Cha. 2. c. 4	31 October 1665
An Act for continuance of a former Act (Note: Licensing of the Press Act 1662 (14 Cha. 2. c. 33)) for regulateing the Presse. (Repealed by Statute Law Revision Act 1863 (26 & 27 Vict. c. 125))
Attainder of Certain Persons Act 1665 (repealed)	17 Cha. 2. c. 5	31 October 1665
An Act for attainting Thomas Dolman Joseph Bampfield and Thomas Scott of High-Treason if they render not themselves by a day. (Repealed by Statute Law Revision Act 1863 (26 & 27 Vict. c. 125))
Damage Cleer Act 1665 (repealed)	17 Cha. 2. c. 6	31 October 1665
An Act for takeing away of Damage Cleere. (Repealed by Statute Law Revision Act 1863 (26 & 27 Vict. c. 125))
Distresses and Avowries for Rents Act 1665 (repealed)	17 Cha. 2. c. 7	31 October 1665
An Act for a more speedy and effectuall Proceeding upon Distresses and Avowryes for Rents. (Repealed by Statute Law Revision and Civil Procedure Act 1881 (44 & 45 Vict. c. 59))
Death between Verdict and Judgment Act 1665 (repealed)	17 Cha. 2. c. 8	31 October 1665
An Act for avoiding unnecessary Suites and Delayes. (Repealed by Statute Law Revision and Civil Procedure Act 1883 (46 & 47 Vict. c. 49))
Taxation (No. 2) Act 1665 (repealed)	17 Cha. 2. c. 9	31 October 1665
An Act for granting One Months Assessment to His Majestie. (Repealed by Statute Law Revision Act 1863 (26 & 27 Vict. c. 125))

=== Private acts ===
Short title	Citation	Royal assent
Long title
Naturalization of Lewis Blanquefort and others.	17 Cha. 2. c. 1 Pr.	31 October 1665
An Act for the Naturalization of Lewis Blanquefort and others.

=== Sources ===
- Raithby, John, ed. (1963) [1819]. "17° Car. II.". Statutes of the Realm. Vol. 5: The Statutes of King Charles I and King Charles II (1625–1680). London: Dawsons. pp. 570–583 – via HathiTrust.
- Raithby, John, ed. (1819). Statutes of the Realm. Vol. 5: 1628-80 – via British History Online.
- Pickering, Danby, ed. (1763). "Anno decimo septimo Caroli II". The Statutes at Large. Vol. 8: From the Twelfth Year of King Charles II to the Last Year of King James II. Inclusive. Cambridge: Joseph Bentham. pp. 217–226 – via Internet Archive.
- Chronological Table of and Index to the Statutes. Vol. 1: To the End of the Session 59 Vict. Sess. 2 (1895) (13th ed.). London: Her Majesty's Stationery Office. 1896. p. 71 – via Google Books.
- Chronological Table of the Statutes: Covering the Period from 1235 to the End of 1971. London: Her Majesty's Stationery Office. 1972. p. 69. ISBN 978-0-11-840096-1 – via Google Books.
- "Chronological Tables of the Private and Personal Acts: Part 3 (1660–1680)". legislation.gov.uk. The National Archives.

== See also ==
- List of acts of the Parliament of England
