= Queen Anne's Bounty =

Scheme for assisting poorer clergy of the Church of England

Queen Anne's Bounty was a scheme established in 1704 to augment the incomes of the poorer clergy of the Church of England and by extension the organisation ("The Governors of the Bounty of Queen Anne for the Augmentation of the Maintenance of the Poor Clergy") that administered the bounty (and eventually a number of other forms of assistance to poor livings).

== Original structure ==
The bounty was originally funded by the annates monies: 'first fruits' (the first year's income of a cleric newly appointed to a benefice) and 'tenths' – a tenth of the income in subsequent years traditionally paid by English clergy to the pope until the Reformation and thereafter to the Crown. Henry VIII, on becoming the recipient of these monies had had them carefully valued and specified as sums of money. This valuation was never revised, and in 1920 the income from First Fruits and Tenths was between £15,000 and £16,000.

The bounty money was to be used to increase the income of livings yielding less than £80 a year. It was not paid directly to incumbents but instead used to purchase land (generally £200-worth), the income from which augmented the living. The livings to be augmented were selected by lot from those with an annual income less than £10, or (in the early years of the bounty) those where augmentation by a third party was offered conditional upon augmentation by bounty funds. Parishes worth less than £20 a year were included in the ballot in 1747, those worth less than £30 a year in 1788 and those under £50 in 1810.

Many of the fine Georgian and Victorian parsonages still in existence were funded by mortgages drawing on the fund after the Clergy Residences Repair Act 1776 (17 Geo. 3. c. 53) was passed 'to promote the residence of the parochial clergy, by making provision for the more speedy and effectual building, rebuilding, repairing or purchasing houses and other necessary buildings and tenements for the use of their benefices'. Known as the Gilbert Act, it enabled the lending of up to three years' income of all benefices for the building or repair of a parsonage house.

== Subsequent developments ==
Augmented parishes came to find it more convenient to not actually purchase land, but to leave the purchase money deposited with the bounty, which paid a guaranteed but moderate rate of interest. The money held by the bounty was invested at higher rates of interest, the difference between interest paid the bounty on their investments, and that paid by the bounty to parishes going to meet the running costs of the bounty and to increase the funds available for augmentation. In 1829 the purchase money deposited with the bounty amounted to over £1m, which was invested in bank annuities (financial instruments of fluctuating value, then worth over £1.3m); by 1900 the bounty was holding over £7m credited to various augmented livings.

The original (first fruits and tenths) income and that from interest rate differences on money on deposit with the bounty, had by 1815 allowed the allocation of nearly £1.5m of capital (securing nearly £0.5m of third-party benefactions) to augment the income of 3,300 livings. To accelerate augmentation, between 1809 and 1820 Parliament made annual grants to the bounty of £100,000; £1.1m in total. As a result, by 1824 all livings under £30 a year had been augmented and there were funds in hand to permit the augmentation of all livings worth under £50 a year. By 1841, it was estimated, the operations of the bounty (discounting the effects of the parliamentary grants of 1809–20) had secured additional church income over ten times that of the first fruits and tenths.

The Ecclesiastical Commission reported (1836) the following data on low-income livings:

Annual income of living	Less than £50	£50–100	£100–150	£150–200
Number of livings	297	1,628	1,602	1,354

(As a rough comparison, in Queen Anne's reign, 3,800 livings had been worth less than £50 a year and therefore excused (in perpetuity) payment of first fruits and tenths.)

After 1836, bounty augmentations were generally to match third party benefactions to livings worth less than £200 a year. In 1890, the total amount distributed was £176,896.

On 2 April 1947, by the Church Commissioners Measure 1947 (10 & 11 Geo. 6. No. 2), the functions and assets of Queen Anne's Bounty were merged with the Ecclesiastical Commissioners to form the Church Commissioners. The archives of Queen Anne's Bounty are now held by the Church of England Record Centre; specific documents may be consulted by appointment.

On 16 June 2022 the Church Commissioners published an interim report on research into links between Queen Anne's Bounty and the Atlantic slave trade. The report said that Queen Anne's Bounty had invested significant sums in the South Sea Company, which transported 34,000 slaves to the Spanish Americas in the 18th century and had received benefactions from people with links to slavery, including Edward Colston. Justin Welby, the Archbishop of Canterbury, apologised for the links with slavery identified in the report. In January 2023 the Church Commissioners announced that they were setting up a fund of £100 million to be spent over the next nine years on addressing historic links with slavery. However, the supposed link between the Bounty and slavery has been questioned, with some MPs, peers, and clergy calling for the scheme to be scrapped.

== Legislation ==
Queen Anne's Bounty (Superannuation) Act 1870 (Note: The citation of this act by this short title was authorised by section 1 of, and the first schedule to, the Short Titles Act 1896. Due to the repeal of those provisions it is now authorised by section 19(2) of the Interpretation Act 1978.)
- Act of Parliament
- Parliament of the United Kingdom
- Long title: An Act to enable the Governors of Queen Anne's Bounty to provide Superannuation Allowances for their Officers.
- Citation: 33 & 34 Vict. c. 89
- Territorial extent: United Kingdom

Dates
- Royal assent: 9 August 1870
- Commencement: 9 August 1870 (Note: The Acts of Parliament (Commencement) Act 1793.)
- Repealed: 27 July 1971

Other legislation
- Amended by: Superannuation (Ecclesiastical Commissioners and Queen Anne's Bounty) Act 1914
- Repealed by: Statute Law (Repeals) Act 1971

Status: Repealed

Text of statute as originally enacted

Text of the Queen Anne's Bounty (Superannuation) Act 1870 as in force today (including any amendments) within the United Kingdom, from legislation.gov.uk.

Queen Anne's Bounty (Powers) Measure 1937 (Note: Section 15.)
- Measure of the Church of England
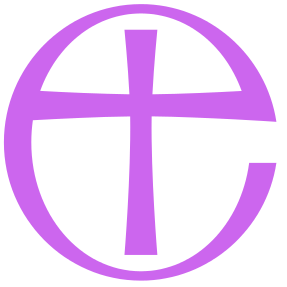
- National Assembly of the Church of England
- Long title: To establish a system of quarterly payments of income payable by Queen Anne’s Bounty to incumbents of benefices, and to provide for the transfer to the Ecclesiastical Commissioners of funds held by Queen Anne’s Bounty for the benefit of ecclesiastical corporations, and for purposes connected therewith.
- Citation: 1 Edw. 8. & 1 Geo. 6. No. 1
- Territorial extent: Provinces of Canterbury and York (except the Channel Islands and the Isle of Man) (Note: Section 14.)

Dates
- Royal assent: 18 February 1937
- Commencement: 1 April 1937 (Note: Section 13.)
- Repealed: 1 April 1978

Other legislation
- Amended by: Statute Law Revision Act 1964
- Repealed by: Endowments and Glebe Measure 1976

Status: Repealed

Text of statute as originally enacted

Text of the Queen Anne's Bounty (Powers) Measure 1937 as in force today (including any amendments) within the United Kingdom, from legislation.gov.uk.

Queen Anne's Bounty (Powers) Measure 1939 (Note: Section 9.)
- Measure of the Church of England
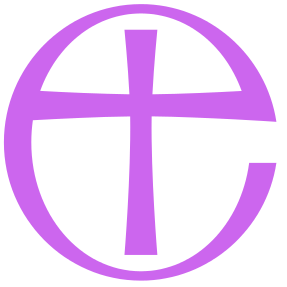
- National Assembly of the Church of England
- Long title: To confer upon Queen Anne’s Bounty additional powers relating to the application of augmentation moneys and securities, the abatement and extinguishment of charges upon benefices, and other matters connected therewith.
- Citation: 2 & 3 Geo. 6. No. 1
- Territorial extent: Provinces of Canterbury and York (except the Channel Islands and the Isle of Man) (Note: Section 8.)

Dates
- Royal assent: 28 April 1939
- Commencement: 28 April 1939
- Repealed: 1 April 1978

Other legislation
- Repealed by: Endowments and Glebe Measure 1976

Status: Repealed

Text of statute as originally enacted

Text of the Queen Anne's Bounty (Powers) Measure 1939 as in force today (including any amendments) within the United Kingdom, from legislation.gov.uk.

- The Queen Anne's Bounty Act 1703 (2 & 3 Ann. c. 20) – repealed by Charities Act 1960

The Queen Anne's Bounty Acts 1706 to 1870 is the collective title of the following Acts:

- The Queen Anne's Bounty Act 1706 (6 Ann. c. 24) – repealed by First Fruits and Tenths Measure 1926
- The Queen Anne's Bounty Act 1707 (6 Ann. c. 54) – repealed by First Fruits and Tenths Measure 1926
- The Queen Anne's Bounty Act 1714 (1 Geo. 1. St. 2. c. 10) – repealed by Statute Law (Repeals) Measure 2018
- The Queen Anne's Bounty Act 1716 (3 Geo. 1. c. 10) – repealed by First Fruits and Tenths Measure 1926
- The Queen Anne's Bounty Act 1803 (43 Geo. 3. c. 107) – repealed by Statute Law Revision Act 1964
- The Queen Anne's Bounty Act 1805 (45 Geo. 3. c. 84) – repealed by Statute Law Revision Act 1964
- The Queen Anne's Bounty Act 1838 (1 & 2 Vict. c. 20) – repealed by Statute Law (Repeals) Act 2004
- The Queen Anne's Bounty Act 1840 (3 & 4 Vict. c. 20)
- The Queen Anne's Bounty (Superannuation) Act 1870 (33 & 34 Vict. c. 89) – repealed by Statute Law (Repeals) Act 1971
- The Queen Anne's Bounty (Powers) Measure 1937 (1 Edw. 8. & 1 Geo. 6. No. 1) – repealed by Endowments and Glebe Measure 1976
- The Queen Anne's Bounty (Powers) Measure 1939 (2 & 3 Geo. 6. No. 1) – repealed by Endowments and Glebe Measure 1976

== See also ==
- Board of First Fruits, in Ireland
- Commission for Building Fifty New Churches
- John Ecton (d. 1730)
- First fruits in Scotland
