= Augmentation of Benefices Act 1665 =

Act of the Parliament of England

Augmentation of Benefices Act 1665 (Note: The citation of this act by this short title was authorised by section 5 of, and the second schedule to, the Statute Law Revision Act 1948. Due to the repeal of those provisions, it is now authorised by section 19(2) of the Interpretation Act 1978.)
- Act of Parliament
- Parliament of England
- Long title: An Act for uniting Churches in Cittyes and Townes Corporate. (Note: These words are printed against this act in the second column of the second schedule to the Statute Law Revision Act 1948, which is headed "Title".)
- Citation: 17 Cha. 2. c. 3
- Territorial extent: England and Wales

Dates
- Royal assent: 31 October 1665
- Commencement: 9 October 1665 (Note: Start of session.)
- Repealed: 1 January 1961
Other legislation
Amended by	Pluralities Act 1838; New Parishes Act 1843; Statute Law Revision Act 1888
Repealed by	Charities Act 1960

Status: Repealed

Text of statute as originally enacted

The Augmentation of Benefices Act 1665 (17 Cha. 2. c. 3) was an act of the Parliament of England.

== Subsequent developments ==
The whole act was repealed by section 15 of the Pluralities Act 1838 (1 & 2 Vict. c. 106), which came into force on 14 August 1838.

So much of the act as enabled any owner or proprietor of any impropriation, tithes or portion of tithes, to annex the same or any part thereof unto the parsonage, vicarage or curacy of the parish church or chapel where the same lay or arose, or to settle the same in trust for the benefit of such parsonage, vicarage or curacy, and authorised parsons, vicars or incumbents to receive lands, tithes or other hereditaments without licence of mortmain, was revived by section 25 of the New Parishes Act 1843 (6 & 7 Vict. c. 37), which further provided that all augmentations and grants at any time theretofore made according to the 1665 act were as good and effectual as if the same had never been repealed.

The whole act, so far as unrepealed, was repealed by section 48(2) of, and part II of the seventh schedule to, the Charities Act 1960 (8 & 9 Eliz. 2. c. 58), which came into force on 1 January 1961.
