= Queen Anne's Bounty Act 1714 =

Act of the Parliament of Great Britain

Queen Anne's Bounty Act 1714 (Note: The citation of this act by this short title was authorised by section 1 of, and the first schedule to, the Short Titles Act 1896. Due to the repeal of those provisions it is now authorised by section 19(2) of the Interpretation Act 1978.)
- Act of Parliament
- Parliament of Great Britain
- Long title: An Act for making more effectual her late Majesties gracious Intention for augmenting the Maintenance of the Poor Clergy.
- Citation: 1 Geo. 1. St. 2. c. 10
- Territorial extent: Great Britain

Dates
- Royal assent: 2 August 1715
- Commencement: 17 March 1715 (Note: Start of session.)
- Repealed: 1 July 2018 (Note: The Statute Law (Repeals) Measure 2018 (Commencement) Order 2018 (SI 2018/718).)
Other legislation
Amended by	Queen Anne's Bounty Act 1840; Statute Law Revision Act 1888; Statute Law Revision Act 1964
Repealed by	Statute Law (Repeals) Measure 2018
Relates to	Queen Anne's Bounty Acts 1706 to 1870

Status: Repealed

Text of statute as originally enacted

Revised text of statute as amended

Queen Anne's Bounty Act 1716
- Act of Parliament
- Parliament of Great Britain
- Long title: An act for the better collecting and levying the revenue of the tenths of the clergy.
- Citation: 3 Geo. 1. c. 10
- Territorial extent: Great Britain

Dates
- Royal assent: 15 July 1717
- Commencement: 25 December 1716 (Note: Section 1.)
- Repealed: 1 July 2018
Other legislation
Amended by	Statute Law Revision Act 1867; First Fruits and Tenths Measure 1926
Repealed by	Statute Law (Repeals) Measure 2018

Status: Repealed

Text of statute as originally enacted

The Queen Anne’s Bounty Act 1714 (1 Geo. 1. St. 2. c. 10) was an act of the Parliament of Great Britain. It was one of the Queen Anne's Bounty Acts 1706 to 1870.

== Subsequent developments ==
The act gave augmented churches legal personality as corporations. The whole act was repealed by section 1 of, and part 1 of the schedule to, the Statute Law (Repeals) Measure 2018, which came into force on 1 July 2018.
