= Precarium =

Form of land tenure

The precarium (plural precaria)—or precaria (plural precariae) in the feminine form—is a form of land tenure in which a petitioner (grantee) receives a property for a specific amount of time without any change of ownership. The precarium is thus a free gift made on request (or precarius, whence "prayer") and can be revoked. The grantor can reclaim the land and evict the grantee at any time, and the grantee's hold on the land is said to be "precarious". (The adjectival form "precarial" is also used.) The precarium arose in the late Roman Empire. In the Middle Ages it became a legal fiction, and the two parties usually signed a contract specifying the rent or services owed by the petitioner. Some precaria eventually became hereditary fiefs. In the Merovingian period the feminine form (singular precaria) became common, but in the eighth century the term beneficium began to replace precarium, although the institutions were practically identical.

== Ecclesiastical use ==
Precarium is discussed in the legal digests of Justinian, and seems to have existed in 6th century Visigothic Spain and France.

In feudalism, the use of church lands to support warriors contributed to the growth of precaria in the eighth century in Catholic Europe. Modern historians have sometimes called these lands fiefs; however, to the extent that they were church property and not property of the lord or king—although that was a flexible distinction in the ninth and tenth centuries—they were not fiefs. The distinction was between the right of ownership in the ecclesiastical manner (jure proprio et more ecclesiastico), which remained with the church, and the right of benefit and usufruct (jure beneficiario et usufructuario), which was ceded away.

The lord or king often paid a fixed rent annually to the church or monastery for the land. This was usually expressed as a proportion of the revenue generated by the property, typically a "ninth and tenth" (nona et decima), that is, a tenth of the original produce and then a ninth of what remained—the equivalent of a fifth of the original total. The vassal or knight using the land did not hold it outright, but during the lord's pleasure he enjoyed all the profits and advantages of the land and its buildings, normally intended to supply the wherewithal required to maintain him and his retinue.

If the church did not have enough funds to stay out of poverty the entire land under precaria could be restored to the church. Precaria not only refers to the contract, but also the land under the contract, the benefice (although the term benefice is also used to describe similar but non-religious circumstances).
