= John Ecton =

John Ecton (died 1730), was an English compiler.

== Life ==
Ecton, a native of Winchester, was employed in the first-fruits department of the office of Queen Anne's Bounty, where he ultimately became the receiver of the tenths of the clergy. He died at Turnham Green, Middlesex, 20 August 1730. His will, bearing the date 7 July 1730, was proved at London on 8 September 1730 by his widow, Dorothea Ecton. Therein he desired to be buried in Winchester Cathedral.

He appears to have left no issue. He devised all his 'manuscript bookes, papers, and collections' to his wife and Dr. Edward Butler, vice-chancellor of the University of Oxford, 'to be jointly att their discretion disposed of in the best manner for the publick service'; but he desired that such as were found completed and likely to prove useful might be published. Ecton was an antiquary and musician. He was elected F.S.A. 29 March 1723. His collection of music and musical instruments he bequeathed to James Kent, the church composer. His library was sold in 1735.

== Works ==
He published:

1. Liber Valorum et Decimarum; being an Account of the Valuations and Yearly Tenths of all such Ecclesiastical Benefices in England and Wales as now stand chargeable with the Payment of First-Fruits and Tenths … (Some Things necessary to be … performed by a Clergyman upon his admission to any Benefice), 8vo, London, 1711.

Of this once useful compilation, seven editions appeared between 1723 and 1796, the best being that published as Thesaurus Rerum Ecclesiasticarum, 4to, London, 1754, and again in 1763, with additions by Browne Willis. In 1786 John Bacon, having changed the title of the book to Liber Regis and made a few additions, published it as entirely his own work, without even revising Ecton's preface. He himself did not add one line of introduction, as is erroneously stated in Nichols's Literary Anecdotes, ix. 5n. This conduct, for which Bacon and his publisher, John Nichols, deserved equal blame, was severely commented on in the Gentleman's Magazine for 1786 and 1787 (vol. lvi. pt. ii. 1027–8, vol. lvii. pt. i. pp. 135, 304–5).

2. A State of the Proceedings of the Corporation of the Governours of the Bounty of Queen Anne for the Augmentation of the Maintenance of the Poor Clergy, from … 1704 to Christmas, 1718, 8vo, London, 1719; 2nd edition, with a Continuation to Christmas, 1720, 8vo, London, 1721.
