= Chop-church =

Trader in religious offices

A chop-church, or church-chopper, was a parson who made a practice of exchanging ecclesiastical benefices. The term is used in an ancient statute as a lawful trade, or occupation.

An example, where the spelling is 'chopchyrche', occurs as the occupation of John Charles of Bishop's Milford, Wiltshire, as a defendant in a plea of debt, for 40/- (forty shillings) brought by John Wyot, merchant of Salisbury.
