= Statute Law Revision (Isle of Man) Act 1991 =

Act of the Parliament of the United Kingdom

Statute Law Revision (Isle of Man) Act 1991 (Note: Section 2(1).)
- Act of Parliament
- Parliament of the United Kingdom
- Long title: An Act to revise the statute law by repealing obsolete, spent, unnecessary or superseded enactments so far as they continue to form part of the law of the Isle of Man.
- Citation: 1991 c. 61
- Territorial extent: Isle of Man (Note: Section 2(2).)

Dates
- Royal assent: 25 July 1991
- Commencement: 25 July 1991 (Note: Section 4(b) of the Interpretation Act 1978.)
Other legislation
Amends	See § Repealed enactments
Repeals/revokes	See § Repealed enactments

Status: Current legislation

Text of statute as originally enacted

Revised text of statute as amended

Text of the Statute Law Revision (Isle of Man) Act 1991 as in force today (including any amendments) within the United Kingdom, from legislation.gov.uk.

The Statute Law Revision (Isle of Man) Act 1991 (c. 61) is an act of the Parliament of the United Kingdom that repealed obsolete, spent, unnecessary or superseded enactments so far as they continued to form part of the law of the Isle of Man.

== Background ==
The Isle of Man is not part of the United Kingdom but a possession of the Crown with its own legislature, Tynwald, and the presumption at common law was that legislation of the English and later the United Kingdom Parliament did not reach it. Two sixteenth-century rulings, both reported by Sir Edward Coke in his Institutes, put the point in strong terms. A judgment of Michaelmas 1522 by Sir Robert Brudenell, Sir Richard Broke and Sir Anthony Fitzherbert, sitting with the King's Council, held that the island was not part of the realm of England and was not governed by the law of England, and that no "general Act of Parliament did extend to the Isle of Man", although "by special name an Act of Parliament may extend to it". A judgment of Trinity 1598 by Lord Keeper Egerton, Sir John Popham, Sir Edmund Anderson and Sir William Peryam confirmed that the island was an ancient kingdom and not part of the kingdom of England, and held on that basis that the Statute of Uses (27 Hen. 8. c. 10) and the statutes of wills (32 Hen. 8. c. 1 and 34 & 35 Hen. 8. c. 5) did not extend to it.

The enactments repealed by the act nevertheless reached the island by several different routes. Two were named in terms. The Cross-bows Act 1541 (33 Hen. 8. c. 6), which reserved the use of handguns of specified lengths to those living near sea coasts, on the Scottish border, in Calais, Jersey, Guernsey and on the isles of Anglesey, Wight and Man, contains the first mention of the Isle of Man in the legislation of the English Parliament; the Assurance of the Isle of Man Act 1609 (7 Jas. 1. c. 4 Pr.) was a private act concerning the island itself.

Others extended by the general formula covering the King's dominions, which the Reformation Parliament began to use systematically in its sixth session in November and December 1534. The First Fruits and Tenths Act 1534 (26 Hen. 8. c. 3) applied to benefices and other ecclesiastical offices in the realm "or els where within any of the Kynges domynions", and the First Fruits and Tenths Act 1535 (27 Hen. 8. c. 8) was drafted to the same extent. Tim Thornton has observed that the island was not a dominion of England but a territory subject to the English Crown, and characterises the reach of this drafting as a tentative and limited change to the territorial extent of English law rather than a settled assertion of it. The administrative basis for the ecclesiastical repeals was supplied in 1542, when the Bishoprics of Chester and Man Act 1541 (33 Hen. 8. c. 31) severed the bishopric of the Isle of Man from the jurisdiction of Canterbury and annexed it to the Province of York.

A third route was inheritance from a parent act. The Military Lands Act 1900 (63 & 64 Vict. c. 56) does not mention the island at all, but section 6 directed that it be construed as part of the Military Lands Act 1892 (55 & 56 Vict. c. 43), section 27 of which extended the powers of the Commissioners of Woods to land allotted or purchased under an act of Tynwald, the Isle of Man Disafforesting Act 1860, providing that "save as aforesaid, this Act shall not extend to the Isle of Man".

Those enactments remained part of Manx law because the repeals that removed them from the law of the United Kingdom had never been extended to the island. Most statute law revision acts passed before 1973 contained an express provision excluding their repeals from having effect in the Isle of Man or in any other part of the Crown's dominions outside the United Kingdom, and the later ones, although silent on the point, had the same effect; in neither case was machinery provided for extending the repeals to the island after local consultation. That practice was adopted only from 1973 onwards.

== Passage ==
The bill stemmed from an initiative by the Isle of Man Government to modernise the island's law, and was prepared and drafted by the Law Commission in conjunction with the Isle of Man authorities.

The bill was introduced in the House of Lords, where it was read a second time on 17 May 1991 on the motion of the Lord Chancellor, Lord Mackay of Clashfern, who described it as a technical measure and explained the origin of the anomaly it addressed. Lord Mishcon, responding for the opposition, read out a selection of the enactments listed in schedule 2 that had until then bound the island, and observed that its inhabitants would be relieved to be rid of "those rather burdensome enactments of which I am sure they have been completely unaware certainly in this century". The bill was referred to the Joint Committee on Consolidation Bills, which reported that all the enactments proposed to be repealed were either obsolete, spent, unnecessary or superseded, and that there was no point to which the attention of Parliament should be drawn. It was read a third time and passed on 3 July 1991.

Moving the second reading in the House of Commons on 23 July 1991, the Solicitor General, Sir Nicholas Lyell, described the purpose of the bill as being "to remove an anomaly whereby many obsolete Westminster statutes continue to form part of the law of the Isle of Man even though they have been repealed for the United Kingdom", and called the bill "a fascinating microcosm of 1,000 years of Isle of Man history".

The only substantive debate on the bill concerned two of the miscellaneous repeals, the Military Lands Act 1900 (63 & 64 Vict. c. 56) and the Assurance of the Isle of Man Act 1609 (7 Jas. 1. c. 4 Pr.), which Sir Teddy Taylor observed had not previously been repealed for the United Kingdom. The Solicitor General explained that the 1609 act had settled the lordship of the Isle of Man on the Earl of Derby and his heirs, and that the lordship had been revested in the Crown by the Isle of Man Purchase Act 1765 (5 Geo. 3. c. 26), which had itself been repealed by the Statute Law (Repeals) Act 1976. The bill was committed to a committee of the whole house, reported without amendment, and read a third time and passed the same evening. It received royal assent on 25 July 1991.

== Provisions ==
=== Extension of earlier repeals ===
Section 1(1) of the act provided that the enactments which were repealed, whether for the whole or any part of the United Kingdom, by the acts specified in schedule 1 to the act were repealed so far as they extended to the Isle of Man. The 29 acts so specified were:

- Statute Law Revision Act 1861 (24 & 25 Vict. c. 101)
- Statute Law Revision Act 1863 (26 & 27 Vict. c. 125)
- Statute Law Revision Act 1867 (30 & 31 Vict. c. 59)
- Statute Law Revision Act 1871 (34 & 35 Vict. c. 116)
- Statute Law Revision Act 1872 (35 & 36 Vict. c. 63)
- Statute Law Revision Act 1872 (No. 2) (35 & 36 Vict. c. 97)
- Statute Law Revision Act 1873 (36 & 37 Vict. c. 91)
- Statute Law Revision Act 1874 (37 & 38 Vict. c. 35)
- Statute Law Revision Act 1874 (No. 2) (37 & 38 Vict. c. 96)
- Statute Law Revision Act 1875 (38 & 39 Vict. c. 66)
- Statute Law Revision Act 1883 (46 & 47 Vict. c. 39)
- Statute Law Revision Act 1887 (50 & 51 Vict. c. 59)
- Statute Law Revision Act 1892 (55 & 56 Vict. c. 19)
- Statute Law Revision Act 1893 (56 & 57 Vict. c. 14)
- Statute Law Revision (No. 2) Act 1893 (56 & 57 Vict. c. 54)
- Statute Law Revision Act 1894 (57 & 58 Vict. c. 56)
- Statute Law Revision Act 1898 (61 & 62 Vict. c. 22)
- Statute Law Revision Act 1908 (8 Edw. 7. c. 49)
- Statute Law Revision Act 1927 (17 & 18 Geo. 5. c. 42)
- Statute Law Revision Act 1948 (11 & 12 Geo. 6. c. 62)
- Statute Law Revision Act 1950 (14 Geo. 6. c. 6)
- Statute Law Revision Act 1953 (2 & 3 Eliz. 2. c. 5)
- Statute Law Revision Act 1958 (6 & 7 Eliz. 2. c. 46)
- Statute Law Revision Act 1959 (7 & 8 Eliz. 2. c. 68)
- Statute Law Revision Act 1963 (c. 30)
- Statute Law Revision Act 1964 (c. 79)
- Statute Law Revision Act 1966 (c. 5)
- Statute Law (Repeals) Act 1969 (c. 52)
- Statute Law (Repeals) Act 1971 (c. 52)

=== Repealed enactments ===
Section 1(2) of the act repealed 32 enactments, listed in schedule 2 to the act, so far as they extended to the Isle of Man.

Schedule 2 — Miscellaneous Repeals
Citation	Short title	Extent of repeal
26 Hen. 8. c. 3	First Fruits and Tenths Act 1534	Entire act
26 Hen. 8. c. 17	First Fruits and Tenths (No. 2) Act 1534	Entire act
27 Hen. 8. c. 8	First Fruits and Tenths Act 1535	Entire act
32 Hen. 8. c. 38	Marriage Act 1540	Entire act
33 Hen. 8. c. 6	Cross-bows Act 1541	Entire act
5 Eliz. 1. c. 1	Supremacy of the Crown Act 1562	Entire act
23 Eliz. 1. c. 1	Religion Act 1580	Entire act
27 Eliz. 1. c. 2	Jesuits, etc. Act 1584	Entire act
29 Eliz. 1. c. 6	Religion Act 1586	Entire act
1 Jas. 1. c. 4	Jesuits etc. Act 1603	Entire act
3 Jas. 1. c. 1	Observance of 5th November Act 1605	Entire act
7 Jas. 1. c. 4 Pr.	Assurance of the Isle of Man Act 1609	Entire act
12 Cha. 2. c. 14	Observance of 29th May Act 1660	Entire act
1 Geo. 1. St. 2. c. 13	Security of the Sovereign Act 1714	Entire act
3 Geo. 4. c. 60	Importation Act 1822	Entire act
4 & 5 Will. 4. c. 34	Greenwich Hospital Act 1834	Entire act
5 & 6 Vict. c. 14	Duties on Corn Act 1842	Entire act
8 & 9 Vict. c. 117	Poor Removal Act 1845	Entire act
18 & 19 Vict. c. 27	Newspapers Act 1855	Entire act
22 & 23 Vict. c. 30	Coinage Act 1859	Entire act
29 & 30 Vict. c. 65	Colonial Branch Mint Act 1866	Entire act
32 & 33 Vict. c. 71	Bankruptcy Act 1869	Entire act
39 & 40 Vict. c. 59	Appellate Jurisdiction Act 1876	Entire act
54 & 55 Vict. c. 21	Savings Banks Act 1891	Entire act
54 & 55 Vict. c. 69	Penal Servitude Act 1891	Entire act
63 & 64 Vict. c. 56	Military Lands Act 1900	Entire act
4 & 5 Geo. 5. c. 14	Currency and Bank Notes Act 1914	Entire act
4 & 5 Geo. 5. c. 50	Merchant Shipping (Convention) Act 1914	Entire act
4 & 5 Geo. 5. c. 59	Bankruptcy Act 1914	Entire act
8 & 9 Geo. 5. c. 55	School Teachers (Superannuation) Act 1918	Entire act
7 & 8 Geo. 6. c. 43	Matrimonial Causes (War Marriages) Act 1944	Entire act
11 & 12 Geo. 6. c. 10	Emergency Laws (Miscellaneous Provisions) Act 1947	Entire act
