= Queen Anne's Bounty Act 1706 =

Act of the Parliament of England

Queen Anne's Bounty Act 1706 (Note: The citation of this act by this short title was authorised by section 1 of, and the first schedule to, the Short Titles Act 1896. Due to the repeal of those provisions it is now authorised by section 19(2) of the Interpretation Act 1978.)
- Act of Parliament
- Parliament of England
- Long title: An Act for discharging small Livings from their First Fruits and Tenths and all Arrears thereof. (Note: These words are printed against this act in the second column of the first schedule to the Short Titles Act 1896, which is headed "Title".)
- Citation: 6 Ann. c. 24 (Note: This is the citation in The Statutes of the Realm.); 5 Ann. c. 24 (Note: This is the citation in The Statutes at Large.)
- Territorial extent: England and Wales

Dates
- Royal assent: 8 April 1707
- Commencement: 3 December 1706 (Note: Start of session.)
- Repealed: 5 July 1926
Other legislation
| Amended by | Statute Law Revision Act 1887; Statute Law Revision Act 1888 |
| Repealed by | First Fruits and Tenths Measure 1926 |
| Relates to | Queen Anne's Bounty Act 1703 |

Status: Repealed

Text of statute as originally enacted

The Queen Anne's Bounty Act 1706 (6 Ann. c. 24) was an act of the Parliament of England. It is one of the Queen Anne's Bounty Acts 1706 to 1870.

== Subsequent developments ==
Section 6 of the act was repealed by section 1 of, and the schedule to, the Statute Law Revision Act 1887 (50 & 51 Vict. c. 59), which came into force on 16 September 1887.

The whole act was repealed by section 6 of, and schedule 2 to, the First Fruits and Tenths Measure 1926 (No. 5), which came into force on 5 July 1926.
