= Queen Anne's Bounty Act 1703 =

Act of the Parliament of England

Queen Anne's Bounty Act 1703 (Note: The citation of this act by this short title was authorised by section 5 of, and the second schedule to, the Statute Law Revision Act 1948. Due to the repeal of those provisions, it is now authorised by section 19(2) of the Interpretation Act 1978.)
- Act of Parliament
- Parliament of England
- Long title: An Act for makeing more effectuall Her Majesties Gracious Intencions for the Augmentacion of the Maintenance of the Poor Clergy by enabling Her Majesty to grant in Perpetuity the Revenues of the First Fruits and Tenths and also for enabling any other Persons to make Grants for the same Purpose. (Note: These words are printed against this act in the second column of the second schedule to the Statute Law Revision Act 1948, which is headed "Title".)
- Citation: 2 & 3 Ann. c. 20 (Note: This is the citation in The Statutes of the Realm.); 2 & 3 Ann. c. 11 (Note: This is the citation in The Statutes at Large.)
- Territorial extent: England and Wales

Dates
- Royal assent: 3 April 1704
- Commencement: 9 November 1703 (Note: Start of session.)
- Repealed: 29 July 1960
Other legislation
Amended by	First Fruits and Tenths Measure 1926; Law Reform (Married Women and Tortfeasors) Act 1935; Statute Law Revision Act 1948
Repealed by	Charities Act 1960
Relates to	First Fruits and Tenths Act 1534; Crown Lands Act 1702; Queen Anne's Bounty Act 1706

Status: Repealed

Text of statute as originally enacted

The Queen Anne's Bounty Act 1703 (2 & 3 Ann. c. 20) was an act of the Parliament of England, granting "in Perpetuity the Revenues of the First Fruits and Tenths" for the support of the poor clergy of England.

== Subsequent developments ==
Sections 2, 3 and 7 of the act were repealed by section 6 of, and the second schedule to, the First Fruits and Tenths Measure 1926 (No. 5).

The words "or women covert without their husbands" in section 6 of the act were repealed by section 5(2) of, and Schedule 2 to, the Law Reform (Married Women and Tortfeasors) Act 1935 (25 & 26 Geo. 5. c. 30).

In this section, the words from "inrolled in such manner" to "bargaines and sales" and the word "inrolled" where thereafter occurring were repealed by section 1 of, and the first schedule to, the Statute Law Revision Act 1948 (11 & 12 Geo. 6. c. 62).

Section 1 of the act was repealed by section 39(1) of, and schedule 5 to, the Charities Act 1960 (8 & 9 Eliz. 2. c. 58), which came into force on 1 January 1961.

The whole act, so far as not otherwise repealed, was repealed by section 48(2) of, and part II of schedule 7 to, the Charities Act 1960.

== See also ==
- Queen Anne's Bounty
