= Capitulary of Herstal =

The Capitulary of Herstal, or Capitulare Haristalense, was a capitulary issued during the reign of Charlemagne which was intended to organize the functioning of the kingdom of the Franks, especially the restoration of order in the Church and State, and the strengthening of royal power. It was drawn up within the framework of a mixed assembly of the kingdom (counts and bishops) in March 779.

== Context ==
The assembly of counts, abbots and bishops met at Herstal, for 14 years Charlemagne's favourite residence, in March 779, following a serious political crisis linked to the disaster of the expedition to Spain, the uprising of the Saxons who threatened Cologne, and the fear of other revolts in Aquitaine and Septimania. Added to this was a severe famine, which Charlemagne tried to combat with the capitulary. François Louis Ganshof wrote that "Undoubtedly in the opinion of Charlemagne and his counsellors, the crises of 778 were interpreted as a warning from Heaven to eradicate scandalous abuses and to make justice prevail."

== The two capitularies of Herstal ==
Two capitularies were drawn up in March 779, the other being known as the Capitulare episcoporum. Hubert Mordek, in a detailed investigation, establishes the dating of March 779 and associates the two capitularies, where Boretius leaned towards the beginning of the year 780 and Ganshof towards 792-793. It can also be found named as "the double capitulary of Herstal".

== Significance ==
The Capitulary of Herstal is the first text to use the term capitulare in the same sense as constitutio, decretum or even edictum, terms with a strong "legislative" connotation linked to imperial authority during the Later Roman Empire. Carlo De Clercq, in 1936, described the capitulary of 779 as "the constitutive charter that Charlemagne gave to all the territories of the ancient Frankish kingdom".

== Content ==
The Capitulary contains 23 clauses, the first seven dealing with Church matters, the remainder aimed at the laity. The payment of tithes, of which a part are to be devoted to relieving the poor, is made obligatory throughout the Frankish kingdom. The subordination of priests to bishops and of bishops to metropolitans is stressed. The king's vassals are ordered, on pain of losing their offices, to administer justice fairly against murderers, robbers and perjurers, particular emphasis being laid on these measures to maintain order. Frankish counts are empowered to execute or mutilate offenders provided that they do so to secure justice, rather than to advance their own private ends. The formation of armed bands is prohibited. Feuds are henceforth to be settled by the payment of compensation.
