= Charities Act 1960 =

Act of the Parliament of the United Kingdom

Charities Act 1960 (Note: Section 49(1).)
- Act of Parliament
- Parliament of the United Kingdom
- Long title: An Act to replace with new provisions the Charitable Trusts Acts, 1853 to 1939, and other enactments relating to charities, to repeal the mortmain Acts, to make further provision as to the powers exercisable by or with respect to charities or with respect to gifts to charity, and for purposes connected therewith.
- Citation: 8 & 9 Eliz. 2. c. 58
- Territorial extent: England and Wales (Note: Section 49(2).)

Dates
- Royal assent: 29 July 1960
- Commencement: 29 July 1960 (Note: Section 49(3). Sections 1 (with the first schedule), 38 (with Part II of the seventh schedule), and 47 only.); 1 January 1961 (Note: Section 49(3).)
- Repealed: 1 August 1993
Other legislation
Amends	Landlord and Tenant Act 1927; See § Repealed enactments
Repeals/revokes	See § Repealed enactments
Amended by	Museum of London Act 1965; Criminal Law Act 1967; Rent Act 1968; Statute Law (Repeals) Act 1969; Income and Corporation Taxes Act 1970; House of Commons Disqualification Act 1975; Administration of Justice Act 1977; Statute Law (Repeals) Act 1978; National Heritage Act 1983; Statute Law (Repeals) Act 1986; Museums and Galleries Act 1992; Land Registration Act 2002; Statute Law (Repeals) Act 2004
Repealed by	Charities Act 1993; Charities Act 2006

Status: Repealed

Text of statute as originally enacted

Revised text of statute as amended

The Charities Act 1960 (8 & 9 Eliz. 2. c. 58) was an act of the Parliament of the United Kingdom that replaced the Charitable Trusts Acts 1853 to 1939 with new provisions governing charities in England and Wales, and repealed the law of mortmain.

== Provisions ==
=== Repealed enactments ===
Section 39(1) of the act repealed 28 enactments as obsolete, listed in the fifth schedule to the act.

Citation	Short title	Extent of repeal
33 Hen. 8. c. 27	Leases by Corporations Act 1541	The whole act.
1 Edw. 6. c. 14	Dissolution of Colleges Act 1547	The whole act.
13 Eliz. 1. c. 10	Ecclesiastical Leases Act 1571	In section two, the words "master or guardian of any hospital" and the word "hospital".
14 Eliz. 1. c. 14	Hospitals for the Poor Act 1572	The whole act.
39 Eliz. 1. c. 5	Hospitals for the Poor Act 1597	The whole act.
2 & 3 Anne c. 20	Queen Anne's Bounty Act 1703	Section one.
9 Geo. 2. c. 36	Charitable Uses Act 1735	Section five.
52 Geo. 3. c. 102	Charitable Donations Registration Act 1812	The whole act.
1 & 2 Will. 4. c. 60	Vestries Act 1831	Section thirty-nine.
2 & 3 Will. 4. c. 57	Charities Procedure Act 1832	Section three.
6 & 7 Will. 4. c. 77	Ecclesiastical Commissioners Act 1836	Sections one to eight.
3 & 4 Vict. c. 77	Grammar Schools Act 1840	The whole act.
7 & 8 Vict. c. 45	Nonconformists Chapels Act 1844	The whole act, but without prejudice to the operation of section two as it applies to charities taking effect before the commencement of that act.
14 & 15 Vict. c. 102	Seamen's Fund Winding-up Act 1851	The whole act.
18 & 19 Vict. c. 120	Metropolis Management Act 1855	Section one hundred and ninety-nine.
22 Vict. c. 27	Recreation Grounds Act 1859	The whole act.
23 & 24 Vict. c. 11	Endowed Schools Act 1860	The whole act.
23 & 24 Vict. c. 134	Roman Catholic Charities Act 1860	The whole act, but without prejudice to the operation of section five as it applies to charities taking effect before the commencement of that act.
32 & 33 Vict. c. 56	Endowed Schools Act 1869	Paragraph (3) of section eight; section thirteen; section twenty-seven; section thirty; section thirty-two from "subject" onwards; section forty-two; section fifty-two; section fifty-five from "and" onwards.
33 & 34 Vict. c. 75	Elementary Education Act 1870	Section seventy-five.
36 & 37 Vict. c. 87	Endowed Schools Act 1873	Section three.
37 & 38 Vict. c. 87	Endowed Schools Act 1874	Section six.
38 & 39 Vict. c. 29	Endowed Schools (Vested Interests) Act Continuance Act 1875	The whole act.
45 & 46 Vict. c. 80	Allotments Extension Act 1882	The whole act, except section six.
46 & 47 Vict. c. 18	Municipal Corporations Act 1883	In section three, paragraph (b) of subsection (1) and subsection (2); subsection (2) of section four; sections eight to eleven; in section twelve, the words "or the Charity Commissioners", the words "and Charity Commissioners" and the words "and charities respectively"; section fourteen to the words "scheme; and"; section twenty; in section twenty-seven the definition of "official trustees".
59 & 60 Vict. c. 25	Friendly Societies Act 1896	Subsection (3) of section forty-seven.
62 & 63 Vict. c. 14	London Government Act 1899	Subsections (4) to (6) of section twenty-three.
8 Edw. 7. c. 39	Endowed Schools (Masters) Act 1908	The whole act.

Section 48(2) of the act repealed 161 enactments as superseded, listed in parts I and II of the seventh schedule to the act.

Part I Principal Repeals — A. Acts of Parliament
Citation	Short title	Extent of repeal
14 Eliz. 1. c. 11	Ecclesiastical Leases Act 1572	In section five the words "masters or guardians of any hospital" and the words "and hospitals".
52 Geo. 3. c. 101	Charities Procedure Act 1812	The whole act.
6 & 7 Will. 4. c. 20	Ecclesiastical Leases Act 1836	The words "nor any master or guardian of any hospital" in section one, and the words "or hospital" and the words "master or guardian", wherever occurring in sections one, two, four and five.
6 & 7 Will. 4. c. 64	Ecclesiastical Leases (Amendment) Act 1836	In section one, the words "master or guardian", in both places.
13 & 14 Vict. c. 28	Trustee Appointment Act 1850	The whole act.
14 & 15 Vict. c. 56	Charities (Service of Notice) Act 1851	The whole act.
16 & 17 Vict. c. 137	Charitable Trusts Act 1853	The whole act.
17 & 18 Vict. c. 112	Literary and Scientific Institutions Act 1854	Section twelve.
18 & 19 Vict. c. 124	Charitable Trusts Amendment Act 1855	The whole act.
23 & 24 Vict. c. 136	Charitable Trusts Act 1860	The whole act.
25 & 26 Vict. c. 112	Charitable Trusts Act 1862	The whole act.
32 & 33 Vict. c. 26	Trustee Appointment Act 1869	The whole act.
32 & 33 Vict. c. 56	Endowed Schools Act 1869	Section twenty-eight; section thirty-six from "and submit" onwards; section thirty-seven; paragraph (2) of section thirty-nine; in section forty the words from "submit" to "The Committee may", and the word "such"; section forty-nine.
32 & 33 Vict. c. 110	Charitable Trusts Act 1869	The whole act.
33 & 34 Vict. c. 75	Elementary Education Act 1870	The whole act, so far as not otherwise repealed.
35 & 36 Vict. c. 24	Charitable Trustees Incorporation Act 1872	Section two from "Provided always" onwards; in the Schedule, the words "'and 'Registered'".
36 & 37 Vict. c. 19	Poor Allotments Management Act 1873	Section sixteen.
36 & 37 Vict. c. 87	Endowed Schools Act 1873	Section ten; section thirteen to the word "apply"; section sixteen.
37 & 38 Vict. c. 87	Endowed Schools Act 1874	The whole act, so far as not otherwise repealed.
45 & 46 Vict. c. 65	Prison Charities Act 1882	The whole act.
50 & 51 Vict. c. 49	Charitable Trusts Act 1887	The whole act.
51 & 52 Vict. c. 41	Local Government Act 1888	In section three, in paragraph (xv), the words "the registration of charitable gifts under the Charitable Donations Registration Act, 1812".
52 & 53 Vict. c. 47	Palatine Court of Durham Act 1889	Section nine.
53 & 54 Vict. c. 19	Trustees Appointment Act 1890	The whole act.
54 & 55 Vict. c. 17	Charitable Trusts (Recovery) Act 1891	The whole act.
55 & 56 Vict. c. 15	Charity Inquiries (Expenses) Act 1892	The whole act.
56 & 57 Vict. c. 73	Local Government Act 1894	Section fourteen; paragraph (5) of section nineteen, so far as unrepealed; subsection (4) of section fifty-two.
57 & 58 Vict. c. 35	Charitable Trusts (Places of Religious Worship) Amendment Act 1894	The whole act.
57 & 58 Vict. c. 46	Copyhold Act 1894	Section seventy-six; in section seventy-seven, the words from "within" to "1855".
59 & 60 Vict. c. 35	Judicial Trustees Act 1896	In section six, subsection (2) from "whether" onwards.
8 Edw. 7. c. 36	Small Holdings and Allotments Act 1908	Subsection (2) of section thirty-three.
4 & 5 Geo. 5. c. 56	Charitable Trusts Act 1914	The whole act.
8 & 9 Geo. 5. c. 39	Education Act 1918	Section forty-five.
9 & 10 Geo. 5. c. 65	Welsh Church (Temporalities) Act 1919	Subsection (1) of section seven, from "except" onwards.
15 & 16 Geo. 5. c. 18	Settled Land Act 1925	In section twenty-nine, in subsection (2), the words "the official trustee of charity lands or any other" and the words "official trustee or other", and in subsection (5) the words "including the official trustee of Charity lands".
15 & 16 Geo. 5. c. 27	Charitable Trusts Act 1925	The whole act.
18 & 19 Geo. 5. c. 26	Administration of Justice Act 1928	In section fifteen, in subsection (1), the words "subject to the jurisdiction of the Charity Commissioners or of the Board of Education".
25 & 26 Geo. 5. c. 11	Regimental Charitable Funds Act 1935	Subsection (3) of section two.
1 & 2 Geo. 6. c. 63	Administration of Justice (Miscellaneous Provisions) Act 1938	In section fifteen, paragraph (a) of subsection (4).
2 & 3 Geo. 6. c. 26	Charities (Fuel Allotments) Act 1939	The whole act.
10 & 11 Geo. 6. c. 44	Crown Proceedings Act 1947	In section twenty-three, in subsection (3), paragraph (d) and the word "educational" in paragraph (e).
11 & 12 Geo. 6. c. 40	Education (Miscellaneous Provisions) Act 1948	Section one.
14 & 15 Geo. 6. c. 39	Common Informers Act 1951	In the Schedule, the reference to the Leases by Corporations Act, 1541.
4 & 5 Eliz. 2. c. 46	Administration of Justice Act 1956	In section fifty-two, in subsection (1), the words "subject to the jurisdiction of the Charity Commissioners or of the Minister of Education".
5 & 6 Eliz. 2. c. 20	House of Commons Disqualification Act 1957	In Part III of the First Schedule, the entry beginning "Charity Commissioner".
5 & 6 Eliz. 2. c. 42	Parish Councils Act 1957	Section eleven.
7 & 8 Eliz. 2. c. 22	County Courts Act 1959	In section two hundred and five, paragraph (a) of subsection (5).

Part I Principal Repeals — B. Church Assembly Measures
Citation	Short title	Extent of repeal
10 & 11 Geo. 6. No. 2	Church Commissioners Measure 1947	Subsection (3) of section eight.
6 & 7 Eliz. 2. No. 1	Church Funds Investment Measure 1958	Subsection (2) of section five, from "except" onwards.

Part I Principal Repeals — C. Orders in Council
Citation	Short title	Extent of repeal
SR&O 1900/600	Board of Education (Powers) Order in Council 1900	The whole order.
SR&O 1901/587	Board of Education (Powers) Order in Council 1901	The whole order.
SR&O 1902/647	Board of Education (Powers) Order in Council 1902	The whole order.
SR&O 1927/55	Overseers Order 1927	Articles 9 to 11; in Article 12, in paragraph (5), the words "the Board of Education or the Charity Commissioners".
SI 1949/1845	Minister of Education (Transfer of Functions) Order 1949	The whole order.
SI 1950/520	Minister of Education (Transfer of Functions) (Removal of Doubt) Order 1950	The whole order.

Part II Mortmain Repeals — A. Acts of Parliament
Citation	Short title	Extent of repeal
18 Edw. 1. Stat. 1	Statute of Westminster the Third (Quia Emptores)	Section three, to the words "of late".
17 Car. 2. c. 3	Augmentation of Benefices Act 1665	The whole act, so far as unrepealed.
29 Car. 2. c. 8	Augmentation of Benefices Act 1677	In section one the words "the statute of mortmain or" and the word "other" where next occurring.
2 & 3 Anne c. 20	Queen Anne's Bounty Act 1703	The whole act, so far as not otherwise repealed.
42 Geo. 3. c. 116	Land Tax Redemption Act 1802	In section nine the words "statutes of mortmain or other"; section fifty; sections one hundred and sixty-one and one hundred and sixty-two.
43 Geo. 3. c. 107	Queen Anne's Bounty Act 1803	The preamble and section one.
43 Geo. 3. c. 108	Gifts for Churches Act 1803	Sections one to three; section four from "and such last-mentioned person" onwards.
51 Geo. 3. c. 115	Gifts for Churches Act 1811	The preamble; in section one the words from "and such person" to "mortmain or" except the word "notwithstanding", and the words from "or to alter" onwards; in section two, the words "statute prohibiting any alienation in mortmain or other".
55 Geo. 3. c. 147	Glebe Exchange Act 1815	In section one, the words from "without any licence" to "notwithstanding"; section four; section five; section six from "without any licence" onwards.
7 Geo. 4. c. 16	Chelsea and Kilmainham Hospitals Act 1826	In section forty-four, the words "the statutes of mortmain or" and the word "other" where next occurring.
7 Geo. 4. c. 66	Clergy Residence Act 1826	Section one from "without any licence" to "notwithstanding".
2 & 3 Will. 4. c. 115	Roman Catholic Charities Act 1832	Section five.
4 & 5 Vict. c. 39	Ecclesiastical Commissioners Act 1841	In section thirteen, the words from "the statutes of mortmain" to "notwithstanding", and the words "of holding in mortmain".
7 & 8 Vict. c. 37	School Sites Act 1844	Section three.
12 & 13 Vict. c. 49	School Sites Act 1849	In section four, the words from "and such" to "thereof".
17 & 18 Vict. c. 112	Literary and Scientific Institutions Act 1854	Section fourteen.
21 & 22 Vict. c. 57	Ecclesiastical Leasing Act 1858	In section two, the words from "the statute of mortmain" to "notwithstanding".
26 & 27 Vict. c. 106	Charity Lands Act 1863	The whole act.
26 & 27 Vict. c. 120	Lord Chancellor's Augmentation Act 1863	In section twenty, the words "without licence in mortmain."
28 & 29 Vict. c. 89	Greenwich Hospital Act 1865	Section forty-three.
29 & 30 Vict. c. 111	Ecclesiastical Commissioners Act 1866	In section nine the words "and hold without licence in mortmain".
29 & 30 Vict. c. 122	Metropolitan Commons Act 1866	Section thirty-one.
30 & 31 Vict. c. 133	Consecration of Churchyards Act 1867	Section four from "and such conveyance" onwards.
31 & 32 Vict. c. 118	Public Schools Act 1868	In section five the words "with power to hold land for the purposes of the school without licence of mortmain".
32 & 33 Vict. c. 58	Public Schools Act 1869	Section two from "and with" onwards.
33 & 34 Vict. c. 34	Charitable Funds Investment Act 1870	The whole act.
33 & 34 Vict. c. 39	Church Patronage Act 1870	Section one from "and provided" onwards.
35 & 36 Vict. c. 24	Charitable Trustees Incorporation Act 1872	In section one the words "notwithstanding the statutes of mortmain".
36 & 37 Vict. c. 50	Places of Worship Sites Act 1873	Section four, from "One witness" onwards.
38 & 39 Vict. c. 34	Bishopric of St. Albans Act 1875	In section thirteen, the words "and may hold such land without any license in mortmain".
38 & 39 Vict. c. 68	Department of Science and Art Act 1875	The whole act.
39 & 40 Vict. c. 54	Bishopric of Truro Act 1876	In section eight, the words "and may hold such land without any license in mortmain".
39 & 40 Vict. c. 56	Commons Act 1876	In section eight, the words "without license in mortmain".
40 & 41 Vict. c. 48	Universities of Oxford and Cambridge Act 1877	Section sixty.
41 & 42 Vict. c. 68	Bishoprics Act 1878	Section two from "Such contributions may" onwards; in section eight, the words "and may hold such land without any licence in mortmain".
50 & 51 Vict. c. 12	Truro Bishopric and Chapter Acts Amendment Act 1887	In section three, the words from "and the bishop" to "notwithstanding".
51 & 52 Vict. c. 41	Local Government Act 1888	In section sixty-four, subsection (5), from "and with power" onwards.
51 & 52 Vict. c. 42	Mortmain and Charitable Uses Act 1888	The whole act.
53 & 54 Vict. c. 16	Working Classes Dwellings Act 1890	The whole act.
54 & 55 Vict. c. 40	Brine Pumping (Compensation for Subsidence) Act 1891	In section ten, subsection (1), from "and with power" onwards.
54 & 55 Vict. c. 73	Mortmain and Charitable Uses Act 1891	The whole act.
55 & 56 Vict. c. 11	Mortmain and Charitable Uses Act Amendment Act 1892	The whole act.
55 & 56 Vict. c. 29	Technical and Industrial Institutions Act 1892	Section ten.
55 & 56 Vict. c. 53	Public Libraries Act 1892	Subsection (2) of section five from "with power" onwards; subsection (3) of section thirteen.
61 & 62 Vict. c. 24	Greenwich Hospital Act 1898	Section one.
2 Edw. 7. c. 41	Metropolis Water Act 1902	Subsection (2) of section one from "having" onwards.
3 Edw. 7. c. 20	Patriotic Fund Reorganisation Act 1903	Subsection (1) of section one from "and power" onwards.
3 & 4 Geo. 5. c. 32	Ancient Monuments Consolidation and Amendment Act 1913	Section twenty.
4 & 5 Geo. 5. c. 91	Welsh Church Act 1914	Subsection (2) of section thirteen from "with power" onwards.
6 & 7 Geo. 5. c. 60	Sailors and Soldiers (Gifts for Land Settlement) Act 1916	Subsection (2) of section one.
10 & 11 Geo. 5. c. 16	Imperial War Museum Act 1920	Subsection (1) of section one from "and power" onwards.
13 & 14 Geo. 5. c. 16	Salmon and Freshwater Fisheries Act 1923	In section fifty-two, the words "without licence in mortmain".
13 & 14 Geo. 5. c. 33	Universities of Oxford and Cambridge Act 1923	Section nine.
15 & 16 Geo. 5. c. 18	Settled Land Act 1925	Subsection (4) of section twenty-nine.
17 & 18 Geo. 5. c. 40	Indian Church Act 1927	In subsection (1) of section six, the words "with power to hold land without licence in mortmain".
20 & 21 Geo. 5. c. 44	Land Drainage Act 1930	Subsection (2) of section one from "with power" onwards.
21 & 22 Geo. 5. c. 32	Architects (Registration) Act 1931	Subsection (1) of section three from "and power" onwards.
23 & 24 Geo. 5. c. 51	Local Government Act 1933	In section two, subsection (2) from "and power" onwards; in section seventeen, subsection (3); in section thirty-one and in section thirty-two, subsection (2) from "and power" onwards; in section forty-seven, in subsection (3) the words from "and power" to "mortmain"; in section forty-eight, subsection (2) from "and power" onwards.
25 & 26 Geo. 5. c. 9	Herring Industry Act 1935	Subsection (1) of section one from "and power" onwards.
26 & 27 Geo. 5. & 1 Edw. 8. c. 49	Public Health Act 1936	Subsection (3) of section six from "and power" onwards; subsection (2) of section eight from "and power" onwards; subsection (3) of section three hundred and fifteen from "and power" onwards.
26 Geo. 5. & 1 Edw. 8. c. 50	Public Health (London) Act 1936	Section two hundred and seventy-three.
2 & 3 Geo. 6. c. 40	London Government Act 1939	Subsection (2) of section two from "with power" onwards; subsection (2) of section seventeen from "with power" onwards.
6 & 7 Geo. 6. c. 5	Minister of Town and Country Planning Act 1943	In section eight, paragraph (d) of subsection (1).
7 & 8 Geo. 6. c. 31	Education Act 1944	Section eighty-seven; in the First Schedule, paragraph 2, from "and power" onwards.
9 & 10 Geo. 6. c. 46	Police Act 1946	Subsection (1) of section five from "and with" onwards.
9 & 10 Geo. 6. c. 59	Coal Industry Nationalisation Act 1946	Subsection (1) of section two from "and power" onwards; subsection (4) of section forty-one.
9 & 10 Geo. 6. c. 68	New Towns Act 1946	Subsection (1) of section two from "and power" onwards; subsection (4) of section twenty-five.
9 & 10 Geo. 6. c. 81	National Health Service Act 1946	In subsection (1) of section fifteen, the words from "with power" to "mortmain"; subsection (2) of section fifty-nine; in the Third Schedule, paragraph 1 of Part IV from "and power" onwards; in the Fourth Schedule, paragraph 1 of Part I from "and power" onwards; in the Fifth Schedule, in paragraph 2, the words from "and with" to "Provided that".
10 & 11 Geo. 6. c. 49	Transport Act 1947	In the First Schedule, paragraph 1 from "and power" onwards.
10 & 11 Geo. 6. c. 54	Electricity Act 1947	Subsection (1) of section three from "and power" onwards.
11 & 12 Geo. 6. c. 29	National Assistance Act 1948	In the Third Schedule, paragraph 10 from "and power" onwards.
11 & 12 Geo. 6. c. 32	River Boards Act 1948	In the Second Schedule, paragraph 1 from "and power" onwards.
11 & 12 Geo. 6. c. 38	Companies Act 1948	Section fourteen; section four hundred and eight; in section four hundred and fifty-four, in paragraph (b) of subsection (2), the words "the Second Schedule and"; the Second Schedule.
11 & 12 Geo. 6. c. 60	Development of Inventions Act 1948	In the Schedule, paragraph 1 from "and" onwards.
11 & 12 Geo. 6. c. 67	Gas Act 1948	Subsection (1) of section five from "and power" onwards.
12, 13 & 14 Geo. 6. c. 20	Cinematograph Films Production (Special Loans) Act 1949	In paragraph 1 of the Schedule, the words "to hold land and".
12, 13 & 14 Geo. 6. c. 51	Legal Aid and Advice Act 1949	Subsection (10) of section eight.
12, 13 & 14 Geo. 6. c. 91	Air Corporations Act 1949	Paragraph 15 of the First Schedule.
14 & 15 Geo. 6. c. 30	Sea Fish Industry Act 1951	In the First Schedule, paragraph 1 from "and power" onwards.
14 & 15 Geo. 6. c. 53	Midwives Act 1951	In the First Schedule, paragraph 5 from "and power" onwards.
15 & 16 Geo. 6 & 1 Eliz. 2. c. 52	Prison Act 1952	In subsection (4) of section two, the words "with power to hold land so far as may be necessary for the purposes of this Act".
1 & 2 Eliz. 2. c. 33	Education (Miscellaneous Provisions) Act 1953	Section fifteen.
2 & 3 Eliz. 2. c. 55	Television Act 1954	In the First Schedule, paragraph 1 from "and power" onwards.
4 & 5 Eliz. 2. c. 48	Sugar Act 1956	In the Second Schedule, paragraph 1 from "and power" onwards.
4 & 5 Eliz. 2. c. 76	Medical Act 1956	Subsection (2) of section one from "with power" onwards.
5 & 6 Eliz. 2. c. 15	Nurses Act 1957	In the First Schedule, paragraph 8 from "and power" onwards.
5 & 6 Eliz. 2. c. 28	Dentists Act 1957	In the First Schedule, paragraph 1 from "and shall" onwards.
5 & 6 Eliz. 2. c. 56	Housing Act 1957	Section one hundred and fifty-three.
6 & 7 Eliz. 2. c. 32	Opticians Act 1958	In the Schedule, paragraph 10 from "and power" onwards.
6 & 7 Eliz. 2. c. 47	Agricultural Marketing Act 1958	In the Second Schedule, paragraph 1 from "and power" onwards.
6 & 7 Eliz. 2. c. 55	Local Government Act 1958	In the Seventh Schedule, sub-paragraph (1) of paragraph 13.
7 & 8 Eliz. 2. c. 23	Overseas Resources Development Act 1959	In the First Schedule, paragraph 1 from "and power" onwards.
7 & 8 Eliz. 2. c. 62	New Towns Act 1959	In subsection (1) of section two the words "and power to hold land without licence in mortmain".
8 & 9 Eliz. 2. c. 18	Local Employment Act 1960	In the First Schedule, paragraph 1 from "and power" onwards, and paragraph 10.
8 & 9 Eliz. 2. c. 22	Horticulture Act 1960	In subsection (1) of section nine, the words "and power to hold land without licence in mortmain"; subsection (1) of section fifteen, from "and power" onwards.

Part II Mortmain Repeals — B. Church Assembly Measures
Citation	Short title	Extent of repeal
14 & 15 Geo. 5. No. 4	Bishopric of Blackburn Measure 1923	Section two from "Such contributions may" onwards; in subsection (3) of section ten, the words "and may hold such land without any licence in mortmain".
14 & 15 Geo. 5. No. 5	Diocese of Southwell (Division) Measure 1923	Section two from "Such contributions may" onwards; in subsection (3) of section ten, the words "and may hold such land without any licence in mortmain".
14 & 15 Geo. 5. No. 6	Diocese of Winchester (Division) Measure 1923	Section two from "Such contributions may" onwards; in section thirteen, the words "and may hold such land without any licence in mortmain".
15 & 16 Geo. 5. No. 2	Bishopric of Leicester Measure 1925	Section two from "Such contributions may" onwards; in subsection (3) of section twelve, the words "and may hold such land without any licence in mortmain".
22 & 23 Geo. 5. No. 1	Benefices (Diocesan Boards of Patronage) Measure 1932	In section two, the words "without any licence in mortmain being required."
24 & 25 Geo. 5. No. 3	Cathedrals (Amendment) Measure 1934	In paragraph (i) of section one, the words from "with power" to "mortmain".
1 & 2 Geo. 6. No. 3	Parsonages Measure 1938	In subsection (1) of section nine, paragraph (ii), with the preceding "and".
6 & 7 Geo. 6. No. 1	New Parishes Measure 1943	In section three, paragraph (b) from "with power" onwards; in section four, paragraph (2) from "and shall have power" onwards; in section thirteen, in subsection (1) the words from "and may hold" to "that Act", and subsection (2) from "and may hold" onwards; in subsection (3) of section fourteen, the words from "for any" to "and".
10 & 11 Geo. 6. No. 2	Church Commissioners Measure 1947	In section one, in subsection (1), the words "and power to acquire and hold land without licence in mortmain".
11 & 12 Geo. 6. No. 1	Clergy Pensions Measure 1948	Subsection (1) of section thirty-six from "and may" onwards.
8 & 9 Eliz. 2. No. 1	Church Property (Miscellaneous Provisions) Measure 1960	Section twenty-three.

== Subsequent developments ==
The act was substantially repealed by section 98(2) of, and schedule 7 to, the Charities Act 1993 (1993 c. 10), which came into force on 1 August 1993. The remaining provisions were repealed by section 75 of, and schedule 9 to, the Charities Act 2006 (2006 c. 50), which came into force on 31 January 2009.
