= Benefice =

Reward for services or future services

A benefice (/ˈbɛnɪfɪs/) or living is a reward received, usually in exchange for (or as a consequence of) services rendered; such payment also operates as a retainer to help ensure the delivery of such services, or fulfilment of the duties of the relevant office, into the future. The term is still used, although the substance of benefices has recently changed, in many historical parishes and positions within the Anglican Church.

The Roman Empire used the Latin term beneficium to denote a gift (usually of land) given to an individual from the Empire for services rendered to it. Its use was adopted by the Western Church in the Carolingian era, meaning a benefit bestowed by the crown or church officials upon a person, usually a member of the clergy. A benefice specifically from a church, such as a vicar's stipend or the right to live in a presbytery, is called a precaria (pl. precariae); and one from a monarch or nobleman is usually called a fief. A benefice is distinct from an allod, in that an allod is property owned outright, not bestowed for a period by a higher authority.

== Catholic Church ==
=== Roman imperial origins ===
In ancient Rome a benefice was a gift of land (precaria) for life as a reward for services rendered, originally, to the state. The word comes from the Latin noun beneficium, meaning "benefit".

=== Carolingian era ===
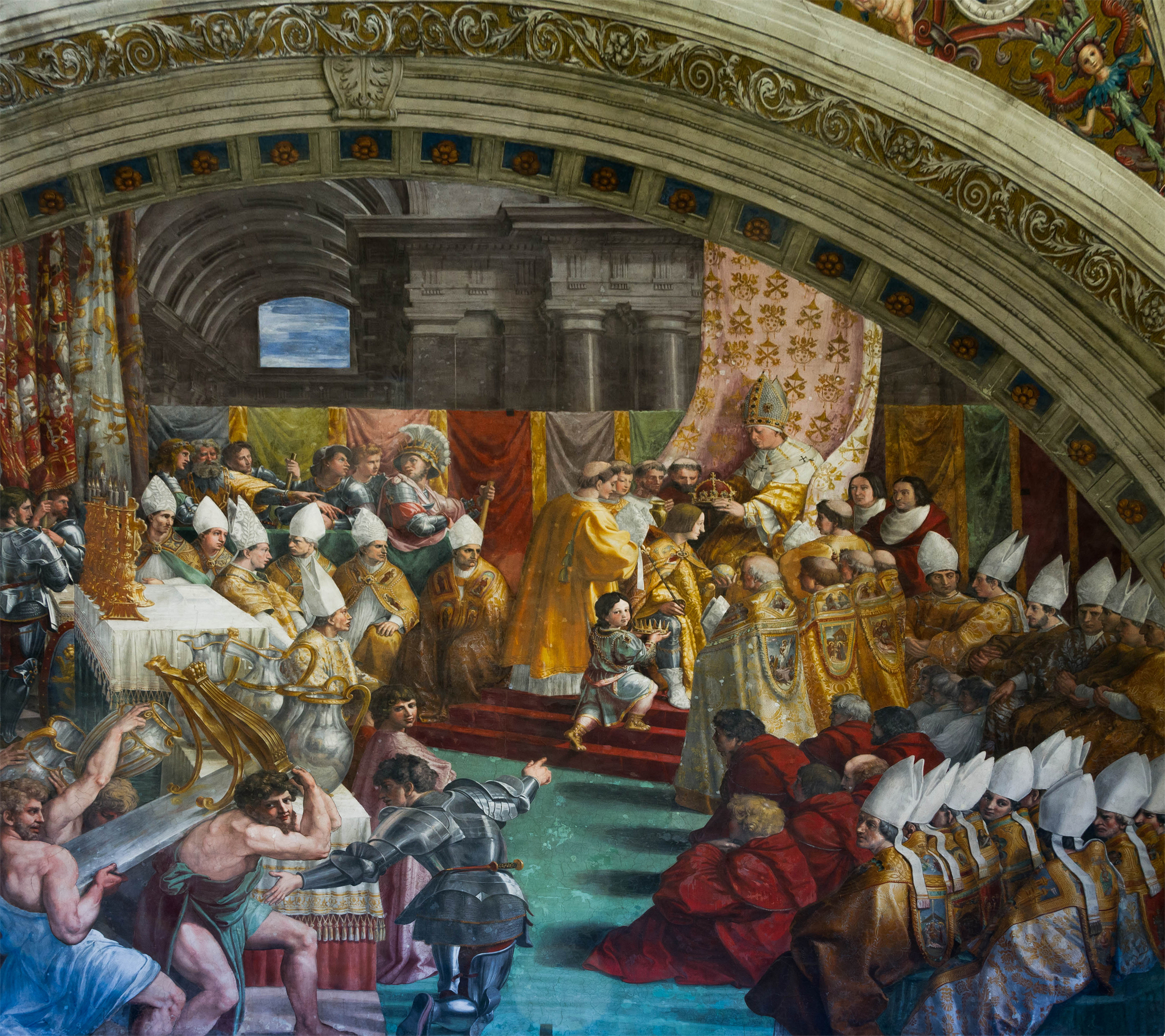
Raphael's The Coronation of Charlemagne (1514–15). The 800 AD coronation led to disputes over an emperor's ability to hand out benefices.

In the 8th century, using their position as Mayor of the Palace, Charles Martel, Carloman I and Pepin III usurped a large number of church benefices for distribution to vassals, and later Carolingians continued this practice as emperors. These estates were held in return for oaths of military assistance, which greatly aided the Carolingians in consolidating and strengthening their power. Charlemagne (emperor 800–814) continued the late Roman concept of granting benefices in return for military and administrative service to his empire. Thus, the imperial structure was bound together through a series of oaths between the monarch and the recipient of land (and the resulting income) (see Fief). He ordered and administered his kingdom and later his empire through a series of published statutes called capitularies. The Capitulary of Herstal (AD 779) distinguished between his vassals who were styled casati (sing. casatus) and non-casati, that is those subjects who had received a benefice from the hand of the king and those who had not, and

towards the end of Charlemagne's reign it appears that a royal vassal who had satisfactorily fulfilled his duties could always look forward to the grant of a benefice in some part of the Empire. Once he had received a benefice, he would take up his residence on it; it was only rarely that a vassus casatus continued to work in the Palace.

In the year 800 Pope Leo III placed the crown of Holy Roman Emperor on the head of Charlemagne. This act caused great turmoil for future generations, who would afterward argue that the emperor thereby received his position as a benefice from the papacy. In his March 1075 Dictatus Papae, Pope Gregory VII declared that only the pope could depose an emperor, which implied that he could do so just as a lord might take a benefice away from a vassal. This declaration inflamed Holy Roman Emperor Henry IV and furthered the friction caused in the Investiture Conflict.

=== Middle Ages ===
The expanded practice continued through the Middle Ages within the European feudal system. This same customary method became adopted by the Catholic Church.

The church's revenue streams came from, amongst other things, rents and profits arising from assets gifted to the church, its endowment, given by believers, be they monarch, lord of the manor or vassal, and later also upon tithes calculated on the sale of the product of the people's personal labour in the entire parish such as cloth or shoes and the people's profits from specific forms of likewise God-given, natural increase such as crops and in livestock.

Initially the Catholic Church granted buildings, grants of land and greater and/or lesser tithes for life but the land was not alienated from the dioceses. The Synod of Lyon of 567 annexed these grants to the churches. By the time of the Council of Mainz of 813 these grants were known as beneficia.

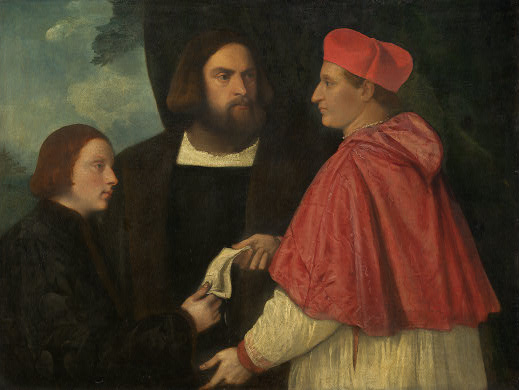
Girolamo and cardinal Marco Corner investing Marco, abbot of Carrara, with his benefice. Titian, c. 1520

Holding a benefice did not necessarily imply a cure of souls although each benefice had a number of spiritual duties attached to it. For providing these duties, a priest would receive "temporalities".

Benefices were used for the worldly support of much of its pastoral clergy – clergy gaining rewards for carrying out their duties with rights to certain revenues, the "fruits of their office". The original donor of the temporalities or his nominee, the patron (Note: A patron would typically be a Lord of the Manor, noble or monarch as they would have initially have granted the land.) and his successors in title, held the advowson (right to nominate a candidate for the post subject to the approval of the bishop or other prelate as to the candidate's sufficiency for the demands of the post).

Parish priests were charged with the spiritual and temporal care of their congregation. The community provided for the priest as necessary, later, as organisation improved, by tithe (which could be partially or wholly lost to a temporal lord or patron but relief for that oppression could be found under canon law).

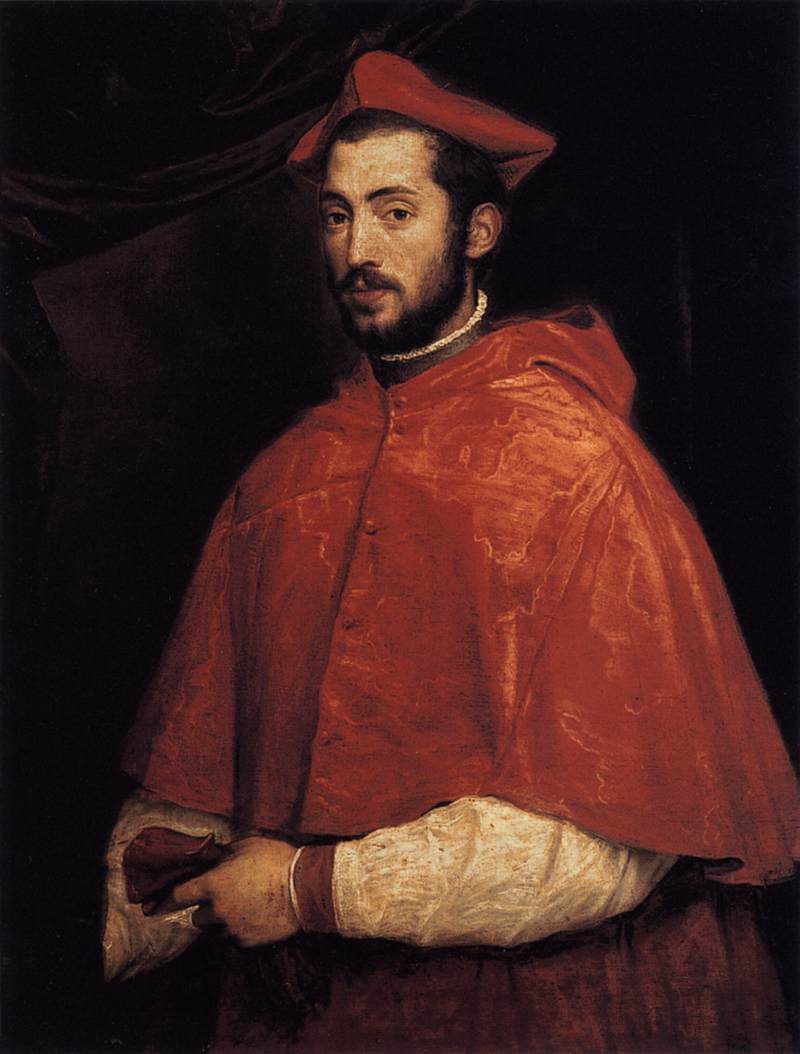
Cardinal Alessandro Farnese, grandson and cardinal-nephew of Pope Paul III, held sixty-four benefices simultaneously.

Some individual institutions within the church accumulated enormous endowments and, with that, temporal power. These endowments sometimes concentrated great wealth in the mortmain ("dead hand") of the church, so called because it endured beyond any individual's life. The church was exempt from some or all taxes. This was in contrast to feudal practice where the nobility would hold land on grant from the king in return for service, especially service in war. This meant that the church over time gained a large share of land in many feudal states and so was a cause of increasing tension between the church and the Crown.

=== Pluralism ===
The holder of more than one benefice, later known as a pluralist, could keep the revenue to which he was entitled and pay lesser sums to deputies to carry out the corresponding duties.

By a Decree of the Lateran Council of 1215 no clerk could hold two benefices with cure of souls, and if a beneficed clerk took a second benefice with cure of souls, he vacated ipso facto his first benefice. Dispensations could easily be obtained from Rome.

The benefice system was open to abuse. Acquisitive prelates occasionally held multiple major benefices. The holding of more than one benefice is termed pluralism (unrelated to the political theory of the same name). An English example was Stigand, Archbishop of Canterbury (1052–72).

After the Reformation, the new denominations generally adopted systems of ecclesiastical polity that did not entail benefices and the Second Vatican Council (1962–1965) called "for the abandonment or reform of the system of benefices".

=== French Revolution ===
The French Revolution replaced France's system by the Civil Constitution of the Clergy following debates and a report headed by Louis-Simon Martineau in 1790, confiscating all endowments of the church, which was until then the highest order (premier ordre) of the Ancien Régime; instead, the state awarded a salary to the formerly endowment-dependent clergy, and abolished canons, prebendaries and chaplains. This constitution kept the separation between the nomination (advowson) and the canonical institution (benefice/living, which conferred a jurisdiction) but the state set a fixed system of salaries and would elect the metropolitan bishops who in turn would elect the curates.

Parts of these changes remain such as the abolition of the three historic roles mentioned, and the constitution is still in force in Belgium.

=== Contemporary developments ===
The Second Vatican Council's decree on Bishops (October 1965) ruled that diocesan bishops should all have complete freedom "in bestowing offices and benefices" and therefore "rights or privileges which in any way limit this freedom [were] to be suppressed". A call for "the so-called system of benefices [to] be relinquished or at least ... reformed" was made in the Council's decree on the ministry and life of priests, issued some weeks later.

== Church of England ==
The term benefice, according to the canon law, denotes an ecclesiastical office (but not always a cure of souls) in which the incumbent is required to perform certain duties or conditions of a spiritual kind (spiritualities) while being supported by the revenues attached to the office (temporalities).

The spiritualities (Note: It appears that the term "spiritualities" was used by a few authors to refer to the revenues received for the carrying out of spiritual responsibilities (see Chambers Twentieth Century Dictionary, 1954)) of parochial benefices, whether rectories, vicarages or perpetual curacies, include due observation of the ordination vows and due solicitude for the moral and spiritual welfare of the parishioners. The temporalities are the revenues of the benefice and assets such as the church properties and possessions within the parish.

By keeping this distinction in mind, the right of patronage in the case of parochial benefices, or advowson, appears logical, being the right originally vested in the donor of the temporalities to present to his bishop a clerk to be admitted, if found fit by the bishop, to the office to which those temporalities are annexed. In other words, the gift of the glebe (a rectory manor or church furlong) was only ever granted subject to receiving an incorporeal hereditament (inheritable and transferable right) for the original donor.

Nomination or presentation on the part of the patron of the benefice is thus the first requisite in order that a clerk should become legally entitled to a benefice. The next requisite is that he should be admitted by the bishop as a fit person for the spiritual office to which the benefice is annexed, and the bishop is the judge of the sufficiency of the clerk to be so admitted.

=== Parochial clergy suitability ===
Under the early constitutions of the Church of England a bishop was allowed a space of two months to inquire and inform himself of the sufficiency of every presentee, but by the 95th of the Canons of 1604 that interval was reduced to 28 days, within which the bishop must admit or reject the clerk. If the bishop rejects the clerk within that time he is liable to a duplex querela (Latin: "double complaint", the procedure in ecclesiastical law for challenging a bishop's refusal to admit a presentee to a benefice) in the ecclesiastical courts or to a quare impedit in the common law courts, and the bishop must then certify the reasons of his refusal.

In the rare cases where the patron happens to be a clergyman (a clerk in orders) and wishes to be admitted to the benefice of his own advowson, he must proceed by way of petition instead of by deed of presentation, reciting that the benefice is in his own patronage, and petitioning the bishop to examine him and admit him.

Upon the bishop having satisfied himself of the sufficiency of the clerk, he proceeded to institute him to the spiritual office to which the benefice is annexed, but before such institution could take place, the clerk had to make the declaration of assent, the Thirty-nine Articles of Religion and the Book of Common Prayer, take the oaths of allegiance and canonical obedience and make a declaration against simony. The first was laid down by the Canons of 1603/04 and modified by the Clerical Subscription Act 1865 which also prescribed the form of the declaration against simony; the words of the oath of allegiance accorded to the form in the Promissory Oaths Act 1868. Current practice is to make a declaration of assent to the doctrine and liturgical practice of the Church of England, and take the oaths of allegiance and canonical obedience as defined by Canons of the Church of England.

The bishop, by the act of institution, commits to the presentee the cure of souls attached to the office to which the benefice is annexed. In cases where the bishop himself is patron of the benefice, no presentation or petition is required to be tendered by the clerk, but the bishop having satisfied himself of the sufficiency of the clerk, collates him to the benefice and office. A bishop need not personally institute or collate a clerk; he may issue a fiat to his vicar-general or to a special commissary for that purpose.

After the bishop or his commissary has instituted the presentee, he issues a mandate under seal, addressed to the archdeacon or some other neighbouring clergyman, authorizing him to induct the clerk into his benefice – in other words, to put him into legal possession of the temporalities, which is done by some outward form, and for the most part by delivery of the bell-rope to the presentee, who then tolls the church bell. This form of induction is required to give the clerk a legal title to his beneficium, (Note: Beneficium is a third alternative word, Latin for a living or benefice.) although his admission to the office by institution is sufficient to vacate any other benefice which he may already possess. A benefice is avoided or vacated

1. by death;
2. by resignation, if the bishop is willing to accept the resignation. (Before the introduction of the Church of England Pensions Board, by the Incumbents' Resignation Act 1871 (Amendment) Act 1887 (50 & 51 Vict. c. 23), any clergyman who had been an incumbent of one benefice continuously for seven years, and became incapacitated by permanent mental or bodily infirmities from fulfilling his duties, could, if the bishop thought fit, have a commission appointed to consider the fitness of his resigning; and if the commission reported in favour, he could, with the consent of the patron (or, if that is refused, with the consent of the archbishop) resign the cure of souls into the bishop's hands, and have assigned to him, out of the benefice, a retiring pension not exceeding one third of its annual value, recoverable as a debt from his successor);
3. by cession, upon the clerk being instituted to another benefice or some other preferment incompatible with it;
4. by deprivation and sentence of an ecclesiastical court; under the Clergy Discipline Act 1892 (55 & 56 Vict. c. 32), an incumbent who has been convicted of offences against the law of bastardy, or against whom judgment has been given in a divorce or matrimonial cause, is deprived, and on being found guilty in the consistory court of immorality or ecclesiastical offences (not in respect of doctrine or ritual), he may be deprived or suspended or declared incapable of preferment;
5. by act of law in consequence of simony;
6. by default of the clerk in neglecting to read publicly in the church the Book of Common Prayer, and to declare his assent thereto within two months after his induction, pursuant to the Act of Uniformity 1662 (14 Cha. 2. c. 4);
7. more recently, also on reaching statutory retirement age.

=== Pluralities laws ===
Pluralities Act 1838 (Note: This short title was conferred on this act by section 2 of the Pluralities Act 1887 (50 & 51 Vict. c. 68)) (Note: The citation of this act by this short title was authorised by section 1 of, and the first schedule to, the Short Titles Act 1896. Due to the repeal of those provisions it is now authorised by section 19(2) of the Interpretation Act 1978.)
- Act of Parliament
- Parliament of the United Kingdom
- Long title: An Act to abridge the holding of Benefices in Plurality, and to make better provision for the Residence of the Clergy.
- Citation: 1 & 2 Vict. c. 106
- Territorial extent: England and Wales; Ireland; (Note: Section 133.)

Dates
- Royal assent: 14 August 1838
- Commencement: 14 August 1838 (Note: The Acts of Parliament (Commencement) Act 1793.)
Other legislation
Amends	Augmentation of Benefices Act 1665
Repeals/revokes	Benefices Act 1545; Augmentation of Benefices Act 1665
Amended by	Statute Law Revision Act 1874 (No. 2); Pluralities Act 1850; Pluralities Acts Amendment Act 1885; Pluralities Act 1887; Mental Health Act 1959; Statute Law (Repeals) Act 1971; Statute Law (Repeals) Act 1974; Endowments and Glebe Measure 1976; Statute Law (Repeals) Act 1993; Statute Law (Repeals) Act 2004; Statute Law (Repeals) Measure 2018
Relates to	Ecclesiastical Licences Act 1533; Church Discipline Act 1840

Status: Partially repealed

Text of statute as originally enacted

Text of the Pluralities Act 1838 as in force today (including any amendments) within the United Kingdom, from legislation.gov.uk.

Dispensation, enabling a clerk to hold several ecclesiastical dignities or benefices at the same time, was transferred to the Archbishop of Canterbury by the Ecclesiastical Licences Act 1533 (25 Hen. 8. c. 21), (Note: Alternatively called the Act Concerning Peter's Pence and Dispensations.) certain ecclesiastical persons having been declared by the earlier Clergy Act 1529 (21 Hen. 8. c. 13) to be entitled to such dispensations. The system of pluralities carried with it, as a direct consequence, systematic non-residence on the part of many incumbents, and delegation of their spiritual duties in respect of their cures of souls to assistant curates. The evils attendant on this system were found to be so great that the Pluralities Act 1838 (1 & 2 Vict. c. 106) was passed to abridge the holding of benefices in plurality, requiring that no person should hold under any circumstances more than two benefices and such privilege was subject to the restriction that both benefices must be within 10 miles (16 km) of each other.

Pluralities Act 1850
- Act of Parliament
- Parliament of the United Kingdom
- Long title: An Act to amend the Law relating to the holding of Benefices in Plurality.
- Citation: 13 & 14 Vict. c. 98
- Territorial extent: England and Wales; Ireland; (Note: Section 12.)

Dates
- Royal assent: 14 August 1850
- Commencement: 14 August 1850
- Repealed: 1 June 1992 (Note: The Church of England (Miscellaneous Provisions) Measure 1992 (Appointed Day Instrument 1992).)
Other legislation
Amends	Pluralities Act 1838
Amended by	Statute Law Revision Act 1875; Pluralities Acts Amendment Act 1885
Repealed by	Church of England (Miscellaneous Provisions) Measure 1992

Status: Repealed

Text of statute as originally enacted

By the Pluralities Act 1850 (13 & 14 Vict. c. 98) restrictions were further narrowed so that no spiritual person could hold two benefices except the churches of such benefices within 3 miles (4.8 km) of each other by the nearest road, and the annual value of one of such benefices did not exceed £100. By this statute the term "benefice" is defined to mean "benefice with cure of souls" and no other, and therein to comprehend all parishes, perpetual curacies, donatives, endowed public chapels, parochial chapelries and chapelries or districts belonging or reputed to belong, or annexed or reputed to be annexed, to any church or chapel.

Pluralities Acts Amendment Act 1885 (Note: Section 1.)
- Act of Parliament
- Parliament of the United Kingdom
- Long title: An Act to amend the Law relating to Pluralities.
- Citation: 48 & 49 Vict. c. 54
- Territorial extent: United Kingdom

Dates
- Royal assent: 6 August 1885
- Commencement: 6 August 1885
- Repealed: 1 July 2018 (Note: The Statute Law (Repeals) Measure 2018 (Commencement) Order 2018 (SI 2018/718).)
Other legislation
Amends	Pluralities Act 1838; Pluralities Act 1850
Amended by	Perjury Act 1911
Repealed by	Statute Law (Repeals) Measure 2018

Status: Repealed

Text of statute as originally enacted

Revised text of statute as amended

The Pluralities Acts Amendment Act 1885 (48 & 49 Vict. c. 54) superseded these and enacted that by dispensation from the Archbishop of Canterbury, two benefices can be held together, the churches of which are within 4 miles (6.4 km) of each other, and the annual value of one of which does not exceed £200.

The Pluralities Act 1838 (Amendment) Measure 1922 (12 & 13 Geo. 5 No. 2) repealed sections 52 and 53 of the 1838 act. These sections required bishops to send annual returns of non-resident clergy to the Privy Council, and this was no longer felt to serve any useful purpose.

The Pluralities Measure 1930 (20 & 21 Geo. 5. No. 7) amended the maximum value of either benefice to £400, and also allowed the Ecclesiastical Commissioners (now the Church Commissioners) to approve the holding of multiple benefices, overriding the limit to two, and the distance and value requirements previously in force.

=== Current usage ===
A benefice or living in the Church of England describes any ecclesiastical parish or group of ecclesiastical parishes under a single stipendiary minister, as well as its related historical meaning.

The term dates from the grant of benefices by bishops to clerks in holy orders as a reward for extraordinary services. The holder of a benefice owns the "freehold" of the post (the church and the parsonage house) for life.

Such a life freehold is now subject to certain constraints. To comply with European Regulations on atypical workers, the parson's freehold is being phased out in favour of new conditions of service called "common tenure". (Note: The term "common tenure" has been chosen to describe more accurately that a benefice has nothing to do with acquiring permanently a freehold property)

== Switzerland ==
As early as the Early Middle Ages, the founder of a proprietary church might set aside a fund, independent of the diocese's wealth, for the upkeep of the priest and the building. With the Merovingian-Frankish extension of land grants to church property in the 8th century, the support of the clergy increasingly came—first in the countryside—through the granting of particular estates, and from the 8th and 9th centuries of entire village churches. After the introduction of the tithe in the 9th century, church property came to be divided, following a system already confirmed by Pope Gelasius I in 494, into the portions for the priest (the benefice proper), for the poor, and for the fabrica ecclesiae. Benefices consisted of landed revenues, usage rights, and dues in kind and money; very unequally endowed, they were granted for life but could not be inherited.

In the High and Late Middle Ages the link between office and benefice loosened. Although forbidden by canon law, the holding of multiple benefices (pluralism), trafficking in them, and the use of a substitute were not uncommon, and the incorporation of parish benefices allowed monasteries to become benefice-holders. Parishioners resisted these abuses; especially in the Alpine region, but also on the Plateau and in the Jura, they managed from the 15th century (and already in the High Middle Ages in Ticino) to acquire patronage rights that allowed them to administer the local church's property and sometimes to choose their own priest.

The Reformation left the legal institution of the benefice in place but, in the Reformed territories, sharply reduced their number through the closure of monasteries and the secularization of church property. In the dominant city-cantons, the council took over the right to appoint to many benefices from the 16th century and placed church affairs under its supervision—a tendency present to varying degrees in all the confederate cantons. In Appenzell Ausserrhoden, Glarus, Grisons, Uri, and the Toggenburg, local communities gained greater weight; the Grison communes could freely choose their confession, administer church property, and appoint and pay their own minister or priest. From the second half of the 17th century, the governments of the Reformed cantons made the first attempts to equalize benefice incomes, and in the 18th and 19th centuries public funds were created for this purpose in both Reformed and Catholic areas. The benefice system declined only gradually in the 19th century, in the wake of the abolition of feudal land charges and payments in kind, and was replaced by salaried employment. With the secularization of church property, the support of clergy and places of worship passed to the state; in the early 21st century the churches finance pastoral work chiefly through the church tax levied by the state. In Catholic areas, the notion of the benefice was abolished by the 1983 Code of Canon Law.

== See also ==
- In commendam
- Chop-church
- Concordat of Worms
- Statutes of Mortmain
- Cestui que
- Tithe
  - Glebe

== Bibliography ==
- Chisholm, Hugh, ed. (1911). "Benefice" . Encyclopædia Britannica. Vol. 3 (11th ed.). Cambridge University Press. pp. 725–726.
- Coredon, Christopher (2007). A Dictionary of Medieval Terms & Phrases (Reprint ed.). Woodbridge: D. S. Brewer. ISBN 978-1-84384-138-8.
- Creagh, J. T. (1913). "Benefice" . In Herbermann, Charles (ed.). Catholic Encyclopedia. New York: Robert Appleton Company.
- Ganshof, F. L. "Benefice and Vassalage in the Age of Charlemagne". Cambridge Historical Journal 6, No. 2 (1939): 147–175.
- Hollister, C. Warren, ed. Medieval Europe: A Short History. (New York: McGraw-Hill, 1994)
- ODCC = Cross & Livingstone, Oxford Dictionary of the Christian Church (OUP, 1974)
- Tierney, Brian. The Crisis of Church and State 1050–1300. (Englewood Cliffs, NJ: Medieval Academy of America, 1988).

This article incorporates text from a free content work. Licensed under CC-BY SA. Text taken from Pfründen, Immacolata Saulle Hippenmeyer, Historical Dictionary of Switzerland.
