= List of acts of the Parliament of England from 1703 =

This is a list of acts of the Parliament of England for the year 1703.

For acts passed during the period 1707–1800, see the list of acts of the Parliament of Great Britain. See also the list of acts of the Parliament of Scotland, and the list of acts of the Parliament of Ireland.

For acts passed from 1801 onwards, see the list of acts of the Parliament of the United Kingdom. For acts of the devolved parliaments and assemblies in the United Kingdom, see the list of acts of the Scottish Parliament, the list of acts of the Northern Ireland Assembly, and the list of acts and measures of Senedd Cymru; see also the list of acts of the Parliament of Northern Ireland.

For medieval statutes, etc. that are not considered to be acts of Parliament, see the list of English statutes.

See also the List of ordinances and acts of the Parliament of England, 1642–1660 for ordinances and acts passed by the Long Parliament and other bodies without royal assent, and which were not considered to be valid legislation following the Restoration in 1660.

The number shown after each act's title is its chapter number. Acts are cited using this number, preceded by the years of the reign during which the relevant parliamentary session was held; thus the Union with Ireland Act 1800 is cited as "39 & 40 Geo. 3. c. 67", meaning the 67th act passed during the session that started in the 39th year of the reign of George III and which finished in the 40th year of that reign. The modern convention is to use Arabic numerals in citations (thus "41 Geo. 3" rather than "41 Geo. III"). Acts of the last session of the Parliament of Great Britain and the first session of the Parliament of the United Kingdom are both cited as "41 Geo. 3".

Acts passed by the Parliament of England did not have a short title; however, some of these acts have subsequently been given a short title by acts of the Parliament of the United Kingdom, such as the Short Titles Act 1896 (59 & 60 Vict. c. 14).

Acts passed by the Parliament of England were deemed to have come into effect on the first day of the session in which they were passed. Because of this, the years given in the list below may in fact be the year before a particular act was passed.

== 2 & 3 Ann. ==
The second session of the 1st Parliament of Queen Anne, which met from 9 November 1703 until 3 April 1704.

This session was also traditionally cited as 2 & 3 Anne or 2 & 3 A.

=== Public acts ===
Short title	Citation	Royal assent
Long title
Taxation Act 1703 (repealed)	2 & 3 Ann. c. 1	17 December 1703
An Act for granting an Aid to Her Majesty, by a Land Tax, to be raised in the Year One Thousand Seven Hundred and Four. (Repealed by Statute Law Revision Act 1867 (30 & 31 Vict. c. 59))
Taxation (No. 2) Act 1703 (repealed)	2 & 3 Ann. c. 2	21 January 1704
An Act for granting an Aid to Her Majesty; by continuing the Duties upon Malt, Mum, Cyder, and Perry, for One Year. (Repealed by Statute Law Revision Act 1867 (30 & 31 Vict. c. 59))
Taxation (No. 3) Act 1703 (repealed)	2 & 3 Ann. c. 3	24 February 1704
An Act for granting an Aid to Her Majesty, for carrying on the War, (Note: The War of the Spanish Succession.) and other Her Majesty's Occasions, by selling Annuities, at several Rates, and for such respective Terms or Estates as are therein mentioned. (Repealed by Statute Law Revision Act 1867 (30 & 31 Vict. c. 59))
Yorkshire (West Riding) Land Registry Act 1703 (repealed)	2 & 3 Ann. c. 4	24 February 1704
An Act for the public registering of all Deeds, Conveyances, and Wills, that shall be made, of any Honours, Manors, Lands, Tenements, or Hereditaments, within the West Riding of the County of York, after the Nine and Twentieth Day of September One Thousand Seven Hundred and Four. (Repealed by Yorkshire Registries Act 1884 (47 & 48 Vict. c. 54))
Wills Act 1703 (repealed)	2 & 3 Ann. c. 5	24 February 1704
An Act to repeal a Proviso in an Act of the Fourth Year of the Reign of King William and Queen Mary, (Note: Wills Act 1692 (4 Will. & Mar. c. 2)) which prevents the Citizens of the City of York from disposing of their Personal Estates by their Wills, as others inhabiting within the Province of York, by that Act, may do. (Repealed by Statute Law Revision Act 1867 (30 & 31 Vict. c. 59))
Navigation Act 1703 (repealed)	2 & 3 Ann. c. 6	24 February 1704
An Act for the Increase of Seamen, and better Encouragement of Navigation, and Security of the Coal Trade. (Repealed by Merchant Seamen Act 1835 (5 & 6 Will. 4. c. 19))
Dover Harbour Act 1703 (repealed)	2 & 3 Ann. c. 7	24 February 1704
An Act for enlarging the Term of Years granted by an Act, passed in the Session of Parliament held in the Eleventh and Twelfth Year of King William the Third, (Note: Dover Harbour Act 1698 (11 Will. 3. c. 5)) for the Repair of Dover Harbour. (Repealed by Dover Harbour Act 1828 (9 Geo. 4. c. xxxi))
Worcester (Poor Relief, Burial Ground and Hopmarket) Act 1703	2 & 3 Ann. c. 8	24 February 1704
An Act for erecting a Workhouse in the City of Worcester, for setting the Poor on Work there.
Bankers' Debt Act 1703 (repealed)	2 & 3 Ann. c. 9 (Note: This is the citation in The Statutes of the Realm.); 2 & 3 Ann. c. 15 (Note: This is the citation in The Statutes at Large.)	3 April 1704
An Act for the better and more regular paying and assigning the Annuities, after the Rate of Three Pounds per Centum per Annum, payable to several Bankers, and other Patentees, or those claiming under them. (Repealed by Statute Law Revision Act 1867 (30 & 31 Vict. c. 59))
Insolvent Debtors Relief Act 1703 (repealed)	2 & 3 Ann. c. 10; 2 & 3 Ann. c. 16	3 April 1704
An Act for the Discharge out of Prison such Insolvent Debtors as shall serve, or procure a Person to serve, in Her Majesty's Fleet or Army. (Repealed by Statute Law Revision Act 1867 (30 & 31 Vict. c. 59))
Public Accountants Act 1703 (repealed)	2 & 3 Ann. c. 11; 2 & 3 Ann. c. 17	3 April 1704
An Act for the better charging several Accomptants with Interest-monies by them received, and to be received. (Repealed by Statute Law Revision Act 1867 (30 & 31 Vict. c. 59))
Privilege of Parliament Act 1703 (repealed)	2 & 3 Ann. c. 12; 2 & 3 Ann. c. 18	3 April 1704
An Act for the further Explanation and Regulation of Privilege of Parliament, in relation to Persons in Public Offices. (Repealed by Statute Law Revision Act 1867 (30 & 31 Vict. c. 59))
Recruiting Act 1703 (repealed)	2 & 3 Ann. c. 13; 2 & 3 Ann. c. 19	3 April 1704
An Act for raising Recruits for the Land Forces and Marines and for dispensing with Part of the Act (Note: Navigation Act 1660 (12 Cha. 2. c. 18)) for the Incouragement and Increase of Shipping and Navigation during the present Warr. (Repealed by Statute Law Revision Act 1867 (30 & 31 Vict. c. 59))
Militia Act 1703 (repealed)	2 & 3 Ann. c. 14; 2 & 3 Ann. c. 12	3 April 1704
An Act for raising the Militia for the Year One Thousand Seven Hundred and Four, notwithstanding the Month's Pay formerly advanced be not repaid. (Repealed by Statute Law Revision Act 1867 (30 & 31 Vict. c. 59))
Importation Act 1703 (repealed)	2 & 3 Ann. c. 15; 2 & 3 Ann. c. 13	3 April 1704
An Act for prolonging the Time, by an Act of Parliament made in the First Year of Her Majesty's Reign, for importing Thrown Silk, of the Growth of Sicily, from Leghorne. (Repealed by Statute Law Revision Act 1867 (30 & 31 Vict. c. 59))
Duties on Salt Act 1703 (repealed)	2 & 3 Ann. c. 16; 2 & 3 Ann. c. 14	3 April 1704
An Act for the better securing and regulating the Duties upon Salt. (Repealed by Statute Law Revision Act 1867 (30 & 31 Vict. c. 59))
Mutiny Act 1703 (repealed)	2 & 3 Ann. c. 17; 2 & 3 Ann. c. 20	3 April 1704
An Act for punishing Mutiny, Desertion, and false Musters; and for better paying of the Army and Quarters, and for satisfying divers Arrears; and for a further Continuance of the Powers of the Five Commissioners for examining and determining the Accompts of the Army. (Repealed by Statute Law Revision Act 1867 (30 & 31 Vict. c. 59))
Taxation (No. 4) Act 1703 (repealed)	2 & 3 Ann. c. 18; 2 & 3 Ann. c. 9	3 April 1704
An Act for granting to Her Majesty an additional Subsidy of Tonnage and Poundage for Three Years; and for laying a further Duty upon French Wine, condemned as lawful Prize; and for ascertaining the Values of unrated Goods imported from The East Indies. (Repealed by Statute Law Revision Act 1867 (30 & 31 Vict. c. 59))
Forfeited Estates Ireland Act 1703 (repealed)	2 & 3 Ann. c. 19; 2 & 3 Ann. c. 10	3 April 1704
An Act to enlarge the Time for the Purchasers of the forfeited Estates in Ireland to make the Payments of their Purchase-money. (Repealed by Statute Law Revision Act 1867 (30 & 31 Vict. c. 59))
Queen Anne's Bounty Act 1703 (repealed)	2 & 3 Ann. c. 20; 2 & 3 Ann. c. 11	3 April 1704
An Act for makeing more effectuall Her Majesties Gracious Intencions for the Augmentacion of the Maintenance of the Poor Clergy by enabling Her Majesty to grant in Perpetuity the Revenues of the First Fruits and Tenths; and also for enabling any other Persons to make Grants for the same Purpose. (Repealed by Charities Act 1960 (8 & 9 Eliz. 2. c. 58))
Estate in Ireland of the Company for making Hollow Sword Blades in England Act 1703 or the Forfeited Estates, Ireland, &c. Act 1703 (repealed)	2 & 3 Ann. c. 21 (Note: Also listed as 2 & 3 Ann. c. 12 Pr.); 2 & 3 Ann. c. 12 Pr.	24 February 1704
An Act to discharge the Governor and Company for making hollow Sword Blades in England, of the Sum of Eighteen Thousand Eight Hundred Sixty-four Pounds, Seven Shillings, One Penny Half-penny, by Mistake overcharged in the Purchase-money for several forfeited and other Estates and Interests in Ireland, purchased by them. (Repealed by Statute Law Revision Act 1867 (30 & 31 Vict. c. 59))

=== Private acts ===
Short title	Citation	Royal assent
Long title
Cholmondeley's Naturalization Act 1703	2 & 3 Ann. c. 1 Pr.	21 January 1704
An Act for naturalizing Elizabeth Cholmondeley, Wife of George Cholmondeley Esquire.
Earl of Warwick and Holland's Estate Act 1703	2 & 3 Ann. c. 2 Pr.	24 February 1704
An Act to enable the Guardian of the Earl of Warwick and Holland, during his Minority, to make Leases of several Messuages, in or near West-Smithfield.
Estates of Ralph Earl Montague and Simon Motton and others	2 & 3 Ann. c. 3 Pr.	24 February 1704
An Act for settling and confirming several Exchanges, with Ralph Earl Montagu, of several Lands and Common, of Simon Motton and others, lying in Gedington, in the County of Northampton, for several Lands of the said Earl's lying near to the same; and for confirming several Agreements relating to the said Exchanges.
Confirmation of execution of a certain agreement	2 & 3 Ann. c. 4 Pr.	24 February 1704
An Act for confirming the Execution of a certain Agreement, made between Ralph Lord Grey Baron of Werke, and Charies Lord Ossulstone and the Lady Mary his Wife, touching certain Manors, Lands, and Tenements, in the Counties of Northumberland, Middl'x, and City of London; and also between Lawrence Earl of Rochester and the said Lord Grey, concerning other Manors, Lands, and Tenements, in the said County of Northumberland, County Palatine of Durham, and Town of Berwick upon Tweed.
Lord Carteret's Estate Act 1703	2 & 3 Ann. c. 5 Pr.	24 February 1704
An Act for vesting several Estates in the Counties of Cornwall and Devon, and several Leasehold Estates, in Trustees, to be sold, for raising Portions for the Younger Children of George Lord Carteret deceased; and for laying out the Overplus of the Money raised by such Sales in Purchase of other Lands.
Lord Viscount Dillon's Estate (Ireland) Act 1703	2 & 3 Ann. c. 6 Pr.	24 February 1704
An Act for Sale of the Estate of Henry Lord Viscount Dillon, in the Kingdom of Ireland, for Payment of his Debts; and for settling an Equivalent, in other Part of his Estate, on the Viscountess his Wife, for her Jointure.
Enabling Sir George Wheeler to make leases of some houses and ground in Channon Row in Westminster.	2 & 3 Ann. c. 7 Pr.	24 February 1704
An Act to enable Sir George Wheeler Knight, and Doctor in Divinity, to make Leases of some Houses and Ground, in Channon-Row, in Westminster.
Enabling Sir John Astley to make a jointure upon his marriage during his minority and to buy in any rentcharge or incumbrance upon his estate.	2 & 3 Ann. c. 8 Pr.	24 February 1704
An Act to enable Sir John Astley Baronet to make a Jointure upon his Marriage, during his Minority; and to enable him to buy in any Rent Charge, or other Incumbrance, upon his Estate.
Confirmation and better execution of articles and agreements for disposition and division of Lord Jermyn's estate among his coheirs.	2 & 3 Ann. c. 9 Pr.	24 February 1704
An Act for confirming and better Execution of Articles, and the Agreements therein contained, for the Disposition and Division of the Estate of the late Lord Jermyn among his Coheirs.
Correction of the defect of the execution of a power in Sir John Ivory, deceased, for making provision for his younger children.	2 & 3 Ann. c. 10 Pr.	24 February 1704
An Act for supplying the Defect of the Execution of a Power in Sir John Ivory Knight deceased, for making Provision for his Younger Children.
Enabling Sir Thomas Tipping to sell the manor of Ickford (Buckinghamshire) for payment of debts, and purchasing other lands to be settled to the same uses.	2 & 3 Ann. c. 11 Pr.	24 February 1704
An Act to enable Sir Thomas Tipping Baronet to sell the Manor of Ickford, in the County of Bucks, for Payment of a Debt charged thereon; and laying out the Surplus-money in Purchase of other Lands, to be settled to the same Uses.
Estate in Ireland of the Company for making Hollow Sword Blades in England Act 1703 or the Forfeited Estates, Ireland, &c. Act 1703 (repealed)	2 & 3 Ann. c. 12 Pr. (Note: Also listed as 2 & 3 Ann. c. 21.)	24 February 1704
An Act to discharge the Governor and Company for making hollow Sword Blades in England, of the Sum of Eighteen Thousand Eight Hundred Sixty-four Pounds, Seven Shillings, One Penny Half-penny, by Mistake overcharged in the Purchase-money for several forfeited and other Estates and Interests in Ireland, purchased by them. (Repealed by Statute Law Revision Act 1867 (30 & 31 Vict. c. 59))
Sir Charles Bickerstaffe's Estates Act 1703	2 & 3 Ann. c. 13 Pr.	24 February 1704
An Act for vesting several Estates of Sir Charles Bickerstaffe Knight in Trustees, to be sold, for Payment of Debts, and making Provision for his Wife and Daughter.
William Adams' Estate Act 1703	2 & 3 Ann. c. 14 Pr.	24 February 1704
An Act for Sale of certain Lands in Charwelton, in the County of Northampton; of William Adams Clerk, for Payment of Debts, and of Portions to his Younger Brothers and Sisters; and settling other Lands, of greater Value; upon his Wife and Children, in Lieu thereof.
Thomas Legh's Estate Act 1703: vesting in trustees for payment of debts, perfecting his purchases and better effecting purposes of his will.	2 & 3 Ann. c. 15 Pr.	24 February 1704
An Act for vesting the Estate of Thomas Legh, late of Ridge, in the County of Chester, Esquire, deceased, in Trustees, for the Payment of his Debts, perfecting his Purchases, and better effecting the Purposes in his Will.
Making void certain uses, estates and trusts, limited in the marriage settlement of Henry Awdley of certain manors and lands contained in that settlement and settling others to the same uses.	2 & 3 Ann. c. 16 Pr.	24 February 1704
An Act for the making void certain Uses, Estates, and Trusts, limited in the Marriage Settlement of Henry Awdley Esquire, of certain Manors and Lands contained in that Settlement; and settling other Manors and Lands, of better Value, to and for the same Uses, Estates, and Trusts.
Robert Cawdron's Estate Act 1703	2 & 3 Ann. c. 17 Pr.	24 February 1704
An Act to enable Robert Cawdron Esquire to settle Part of his Estate (which he has improved) for raising Portions for his Younger Children.
Sir Robert Kemp's Estate Act 1703: vesting lands in Essex in trustees for benefit of the children and grandchildren of Elizabeth Outlaw, one of his sisters.	2 & 3 Ann. c. 18 Pr.	24 February 1704
An Act for vesting Lands in Essex, devised by Sir Robert Kemp Knight deceased, to the Children and Grandchildren of Elizabeth Outlaw One of his Sisters and Coheirs, in Trustees, to be sold, for the Benefit of the Devisees.
William and Mary Jarman's Estate Act 1703	2 & 3 Ann. c. 19 Pr.	24 February 1704
An Act for the vesting of Nine Messuages in the Parish of St. Giles in the Fields, in the County of Middl'x, being the Estate of William Jarman and Mary his Wife, in Trustees, to be sold; and for settling, in Lieu thereof, a Messuage and certain Lands, in Whipsnade, Tottrenhoe, and Studham, in the County of Bedford.
Enabling John Jenkins to sell lands in Durham and Northumberland for payment of debts.	2 & 3 Ann. c. 20 Pr.	24 February 1704
An Act to enable John Jenkins Esquire to sell Lands, in the Counties of Durham and Northumberland, for Payment of Debts charged thereupon.
Thomas Harlackendon Bowes' Estate Act 1703	2 & 3 Ann. c. 21 Pr.	24 February 1704
An Act for vesting in Trustees Part of the Estate of Thomas Harlackenden Bowes Esquire, for Payment of the Debts and Legacies wherewith the said Estate is charged; and for preserving the Residue, clear of all Charges, for the Benefit of Thomas Bowes Esquire, an Infant.
Enabling Arabella Foot to purchase lands for benefit of her son Topham with his money.	2 & 3 Ann. c. 22 Pr.	24 February 1704
An Act to enable Arabella Foot to lay out Monies belonging to her Son Topham Foot, in Purchases of Lands for his Benefit.
Enabling the Treasury to compound with John Ferrar for a debt due from him as surety for John Mason late Receiver General for the County of Cambridge and Isle of Ely.	2 & 3 Ann. c. 23 Pr.	24 February 1704
An Act to enable the Lord High Treasurer of England, or Commissioners of the Treasury for the Time being, to compound with John Ferrar Esquire, for a Debt due from him, as Surety for John Mason Gentleman, late Receiver General for the County of Cambridge and Isle of Ely.
Mary and William Bowdler's Estate Act 1703	2 & 3 Ann. c. 24 Pr.	24 February 1704
An Act for the vesting the Manor of Michael Church, in the County of Radnor, and other Lands in the County of Salop, of Mary Bowdler and William Bowdler Gentleman, in certain Trustees, for Payment of the Debts, and making Provision for the Younger Children of the said William Bowdler.
Settling manor of Creech (Somerset) in trustees and enabling them to renew leases for maintenance of younger sons of William Keyts during their minority.	2 & 3 Ann. c. 25 Pr.	24 February 1704
An Act for settling the Manor of Creech, in the County of Somerset, in Trustees, to enable them to renew Leases, for the Maintenance of the Younger Sons of William Keyt Esquire deceased, during their Minority.
John and Robert Holden's Estate Act 1703	2 & 3 Ann. c. 26 Pr.	24 February 1704
An Act for Sale of some Part of the Estate of John Holden Gentleman, and Robert Holden his Son, for Payment of their Debts, and for disposing of Younger Children Apprentices.
Naturalization of Isaac Kops.	2 & 3 Ann. c. 27 Pr.	24 February 1704
An Act for naturalizing Isaac Kopps.
Naturalization of Rene Rance, Mathew Decker and others.	2 & 3 Ann. c. 28 Pr.	24 February 1704
An Act for naturalizing Rene Ranc, Mathew Decker, and others.
Naturalization of de Saint Leger, de la Grange, Wadden and others.	2 & 3 Ann. c. 29 Pr.	24 February 1704
An Act for naturalizing Henry Boisroud de St. Leger, Peter de la Grainge, Lewis Wadden, and others.
Sir Peter and Thomas Tyrrell's Estate Act 1703	2 & 3 Ann. c. 30 Pr.	3 April 1704
An Act to vest the Manor of Hanslop and Castlethrop, and all other the Lands and Hereditaments of Sir Peter Tyrril Baronet, and Thomas Tyrril Esquire his Son, in the County of Bucks, in Trustees, to sell Part thereof, for Payment of Debts; and to settle other Lands and Hereditaments there, being of an equal Value, in Lieu of Lands to be sold.
Enabling Sir John Cowper and Anthony Henly to make a partition and grant building leases of several messuages and tenements in Lincoln's Inn Fields (Middlesex).	2 & 3 Ann. c. 31 Pr.	3 April 1704
An Act to enable Sir John Cowper Knight, and Anthony Henley Esquire, to make a Partition, and grant Building Leases, of several Messuages and Tenements, in Lincolne's Inn Fields, in the Parishes of St. Gyles in the Fields and St. Clement's Danes, in the County of Middl'x.
Philipson's Estate Act 1703	2 & 3 Ann. c. 32 Pr.	3 April 1704
An Act to vest Part of the Estate of Sir Christopher Philipson Knight in Trustees, to be sold, for Payment of Debt; and for charging Part thereof with Maintenance for a Daughter, who is a Lunatic.
Carey's Estate Act 1703	2 & 3 Ann. c. 33 Pr.	3 April 1704
An Act for vesting the Manor of Yeovilton, in the County of Somerset, and other Lands therein mentioned, of William Cary Esquire, in Trustees, for discharging Incumbrances, and making Provision for his Younger Children; and settling other Lands, in the County of Devon, in Lieu thereof.
Holworthy's Estate Act 1703	2 & 3 Ann. c. 34 Pr.	3 April 1704
An Act for vesting divers Manors and Lands of Mathew Holworthy Esquire in Trustees, to be sold; and purchasing other Manors or Lands, of equal Value; and limiting the Manors or Lands, to be purchased, to the same Uses as the Lands to be sold are limited.
Enabling Bernard Cotton to sell part of his estate for payment of debts and confirming conveyances already made by himself and trustees.	2 & 3 Ann. c. 35 Pr.	3 April 1704
An Act for enabling Bernard Cotton Esquire to sell some Part of his Estate, for Payment of his Debts; and for confirming several Conveyances, already made, of several other Parcels of his Estate, by himself and Trustees, to several Purchasers thereof.
Andrews' Estate Act 1703	2 & 3 Ann. c. 36 Pr.	3 April 1704
An Act to charge the Estate of Ambrose Andrews Gentleman with Monies, for Payment of Debts; and for supplying some Defects in the Settlement of the said Estate, for making a Jointure and Leases upon the said Estate.
Confirmation of a partition and agreement concerning Sir Thomas Style's estate.	2 & 3 Ann. c. 37 Pr.	3 April 1704
An Act to establish and confirm a Partition and Agreement, of and touching the Estate of Sir Thomas Style, late of Wateringbury, in the County of Kent, Baronet.
Lamplough's Estate Act 1703	2 & 3 Ann. c. 38 Pr.	3 April 1704
An Act for settling the Estate of Doctor Thomas Lamplugh deceased, pursuant to his Marriage Articles, and Settlement prepared for that Purpose; and for Provision for his Younger Children.
For better securing and vesting in Giles Frampton the manor and farm of Moorton alias Moreton and Hurst (Dorset) and other lands of William Frampton deceased and in such as are entitled in remainder after him upon Tregonwell Frampton's death.	2 & 3 Ann. c. 39 Pr.	3 April 1704
An Act for the better vesting in Giles Frampton Esquire the Manor and Farm of Moorton, alias Moreton, and Hurst, in the County of Dorset, in Possession; and for the better securing the same, and the other Manors, Farms, Messuages, Lands, Tenements, and Hereditaments, late of William Frampton Esquire, deceased, to him the said Giles Frampton, and such as are entitled in Remainder after him, upon the Death of Tregonwell Frampton Esquire.
Enabling George Evelyn to raise portions for siblings.	2 & 3 Ann. c. 40 Pr.	3 April 1704
An Act to enable George Evelyn Esquire to raise Portions for his Brothers and Sisters, according to his Father's Will.
James Torr's Estate Act 1703	2 & 3 Ann. c. 41 Pr.	3 April 1704
An Act for Sale of Part of the Estate of James Torr Gentleman, deceased, for Payment of his Debts; and for settling other Part thereof to the Uses therein mentioned.
Robert and William Coke's Estate Act 1703	2 & 3 Ann. c. 42 Pr.	3 April 1704
An Act to subject the Estate of Robert Coke, of Trusley, in the County of Derby, Esquire, and William Coke, his Son and Heir Apparent, to the Payment of the said Robert Coke's Debts; and to make Provision for the Wife and Younger Children of the said William Coke.
Setting aside a voluntary settlement made by Mary Fermor and ratifying a partition of manors of Mersham and Pett and lands in Sussex between her, Bartholomew Walmesley and others.	2 & 3 Ann. c. 43 Pr.	3 April 1704
An Act for the setting aside a voluntary Settlement made by Mary Fermor Widow; and for ratifying a Partition made of the Manors of Mersham and Pett, and divers Lands in the County of Sussex, between her and Bartholomew Walmesley Esquire and others.
John Briscoe's Estate Act 1703	2 & 3 Ann. c. 44 Pr.	3 April 1704
An Act for the Improvement of the Estate of John Briscoe Esquire, in the County of Cumberland.
Making good the provision intended for Captain James Roch out of the forfeited estates in Ireland and restoring to the bishopric of Cloyne (Ireland) the manors and lands of Donomore.	2 & 3 Ann. c. 45 Pr.	3 April 1704
An Act for making good the Provision intended for Captain James Roche, out of the forfeited Estates in Ireland; and for restoring to the Bishopric of Cloyne, in the said Kingdom, the Manor and Lands of Donomore.
John Hawe's Estate Act 1703	2 & 3 Ann. c. 46 Pr.	3 April 1704
An Act for setting aside voluntary Settlements made by John Hawe Gentleman, of Estates, in the Counties of Stafford and Warwick, and settling some Part of his Estate upon the said John Hawe and his Son; and for making Provision for the Maintenance of his Son and Daughter, and raising a Portion for such Daughter, and selling the Residue for Payment of his Debts.
Sale of estate of John Digby in Buckinghamshire and division of proceeds between Sir John Conway and Richard Mostyn, settling estate of Sir John Conway in Flintshire and making provision for his children.	2 & 3 Ann. c. 47 Pr.	3 April 1704
An Act for Sale of the Estate of John Digby Esquire, deceased, in the County of Buckingham, and dividing the Money between Sir John Conway Baronet and Richard Mostyn Esquire; and for settling the Estate of Sir John Conway, in the County of Flint, and making Provision for his Son and Daughter, according to an Agreement for that Purpose.
Further recompensing John Baker and family for the services of Colonel Baker at Londonderry and stating accounts of the late receivers of rents and profits of forfeited estates in Ireland.	2 & 3 Ann. c. 48 Pr.	3 April 1704
An Act for the further recompensing of John Baker Gentleman, and his Family, for the Services of Colonel Baker at London-Derry in Ireland; and for stating the Accompts of the late Receivers of the Rents and Profits of the forfeited Estates in Ireland.
Freedom of "Golden Starr" and "Bull," taken as prize, to trade as English ships.	2 & 3 Ann. c. 49 Pr.	3 April 1704
An Act, that the Ships The Golden Starr and Bull, being taken as Prizes, and condemned, may have Freedom of trading as English Ships.
Naturalization of Daniel Barbier, John Kerron du Chesne and others.	2 & 3 Ann. c. 50 Pr.	3 April 1704
An Act to naturalize Daniel Barbier, John Kerron du Chesne, and others.
Naturalization of Henry de Hant, George Chabot and others.	2 & 3 Ann. c. 51 Pr.	3 April 1704
An Act for naturalizing Henry de Haut, George Chabot, and others.

=== Sources ===
- Raithby, John, ed. (1963) [1821]. "2° & 3° Annæ". Statutes of the Realm. Vol. 8: The Statutes of the First to the Sixth Years of the Reign of Queen Anne (1702–1707). London: Dawsons. pp. 226–305 – via HathiTrust.
- Pickering, Danby, ed. (1764). "Anno secundo & tertio Annæ". The Statutes at Large. Vol. 11: From the Second to the Eighth Year of Queen Anne. Cambridge: Joseph Bentham. pp. 1–62 – via Internet Archive.
- Pickering, Danby, ed. (1764). "Anno secundo & tertio Annæ". The Statutes at Large. Vol. 11: From the Second to the Eighth Year of Queen Anne. Cambridge: Joseph Bentham. pp. 1–62 – via Internet Archive.
- Journals of the House of Commons. Vol. 14. London: His Majesty's Stationery Office. 1803. pp. 210–390 – via Google Books.
- Chronological Table of and Index to the Statutes. Vol. 1: To the End of the Session 59 Vict. Sess. 2 (1895) (13th ed.). London: Her Majesty's Stationery Office. 1896. pp. 83–84 – via Google Books.
- "Chronological Tables of the Private and Personal Acts: Part 6 (1702–1705)". legislation.gov.uk. The National Archives.

== See also ==
- List of acts of the Parliament of England
