= Maid of Kent =

Maid of Kent may refer to:

- Joan of Kent, 14th century Countess of Kent and Princess of Wales
- Elizabeth Barton, known as the Maid of Kent (1506? – 1534), prophetess executed during the reign of Henry VIII
- Maid of Kent, colloquial title for any woman born in East Kent, England
- Maid of Kent (steam locomotive), miniature steam locomotive
- SS Maid of Kent, a British ferry later converted to a hospital ship, sunk by the Luftwaffe in 1940
- The Maid of Kent, a 1773 play by Francis Godolphin Waldron
