= Richard Risby =

English Catholic Franciscan friar who was executed for treason

Richard Risby, O.F.M., (1489 - 20 April 1534) was an English Catholic Franciscan friar who was executed for treason during the reign of King Henry VIII.

== Life ==
Risby was born in the parish of St. Lawrence, Reading, in 1489, and entered Winchester College in 1500. He was subsequently a fellow of New College, Oxford, taking his degree in 1510. He resigned in 1513 to enter the Franciscan Order, and eventually became guardian of the Observant friary at Canterbury.

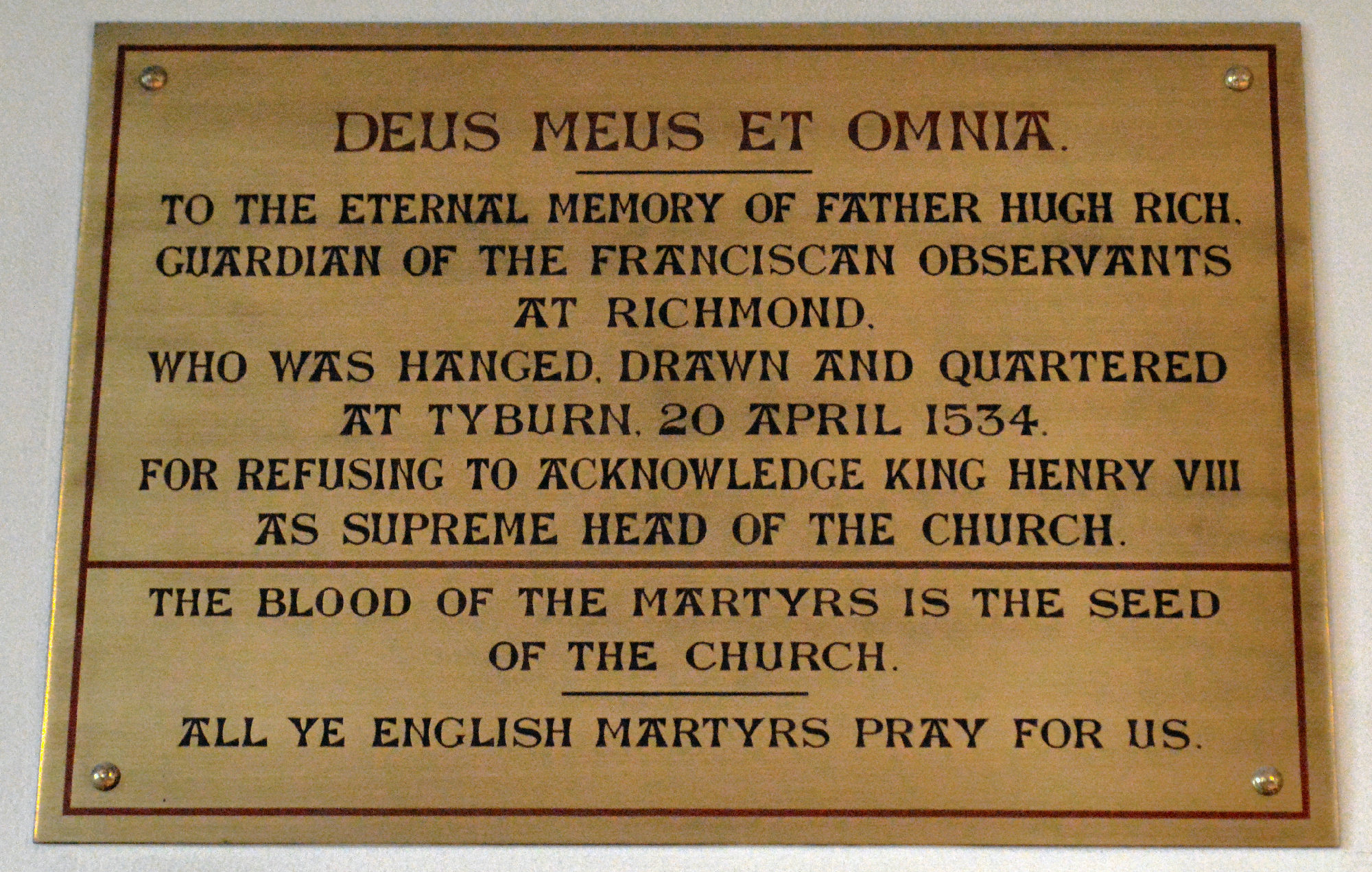
Memorial in St Elizabeth of Portugal Church, Richmond, Surrey

Risby became a supporter of Dame Elizabeth Barton, O.S.B., widely known as the "Holy Maid of Kent", who had the reputation of being a visionary. When she declared that King Henry would soon die if he continued his actions against the papacy, a prophecy that failed to come to pass within the time she predicted, the king turned against her and she was condemned to death by an Act of Attainder (25 Hen. 8. c. 12), together with several of her supporters: Hugh Rich, O.F.M., guardian of the Observant friary at Richmond, Edward Bocking and John Dering, B.D. (Oxon.), both Benedictine monks of Christ Church, Canterbury, Henry Gold, M.A. (St. John's College, Cambridge), Parson of St. Mary Aldermanbury, London, and Vicar of Hayes, Middlesex, and Richard Master, M.A. (King's College, Oxon), Rector of Aldington, Kent, who was pardoned; but by some oversight Master's name was included and Risby's omitted in the catalogue of praetermissi.

Friar Thomas Bourchier, who took the Franciscan habit at Greenwich about 1557, wrote a work chronicling the lives of the Observant friars who were executed under the Tudors, In it he wrote that Risby and Rich had been offered their freedom twice, if they would accept the king's supremacy. Risby was executed by hanging along with the others, including Barton, at Tyburn, London, on 20 April 1534.
