= Buggery Act 1533 =

Act of the Parliament of England criminalising sodomy

- Act of Parliament
- Parliament of England
- Long title: An Acte for the punishment of the vice of Buggerie.
- Citation: 25 Hen. 8. c. 6
- Territorial extent: England and Wales; India

Dates
- Royal assent: 30 March 1534
- Commencement: 15 January 1534 (Note: Start of session.)
- Repealed: England and Wales: 1 July 1828; India: 1 March 1829
Other legislation
Amended by	Continuance of Laws Act 1536; Continuance of Laws Act 1539; Perpetuation of Laws Act 1540; Sodomy Act 1562
Repealed by	England and Wales: Offences Against the Person Act 1828; India: Criminal Law (India) Act 1828
Relates to	Offences against the Person Act 1861

Status: Repealed

Text of statute as originally enacted

The Buggery Act 1533, formally An Acte for the punishment of the vice of Buggerie (25 Hen. 8. c. 6), was an act of the Parliament of England that was passed during the reign of Henry VIII.

The act was the country's first statutory sodomy law, such offences having previously been dealt with by the ecclesiastical courts.

The term buggery, not defined in the text of the legislation, was later interpreted by the courts to include only anal penetration and bestiality, regardless of the sex of the participants, but not oral penetration. The act remained in force until it was repealed and replaced by the Offences Against the Person Act 1828 (9 Geo. 4. c. 31). Buggery remained a capital offence until 1861, though the last executions were in 1835.

== Description ==
The act was piloted through Parliament by Henry VIII's minister Thomas Cromwell (though it is unrecorded who actually wrote the bill), and punished "the detestable and abominable Vice of Buggery committed with Mankind or Beast". Prior to the 1550s, the term Buggery was not used in a homosexual sense, rather related to any sexual activity not related to procreation, regardless of sex or species involved in the sexual act, and also covered sexual crimes of a non-consensual nature. The law was not designed to police sexual activity, rather was simply taking a canon law and making it a statutory law, a test case in removing church power. "Buggery" was not further defined in the law. According to the act:

the offenders being hereof convict[ed] by verdict confession or outlawry, shall suffer such pains of death, and losses and penalties of their good chattels debts lands tenements and hereditaments, as felons be accustomed to do, according to the Order of the Common Laws of this Realm; and that no person offending in any such offence shall be admitted to his Clergy ...

This meant that a convicted sodomite's possessions could be confiscated by the government, rather than going to their next of kin.

By shifting enforcement away from ecclesiastical courts and into secular ones, Henry may have partially intended the act as an expression of political power. He similarly enacted the Submission of the Clergy Act 1533 (25 Hen. 8 c. 19) in the same year and the Act of Supremacy 1534 (26 Hen. 8. c. 1) a year later, with anti-papist motivations. However, Henry later used the law to execute monks and nuns (based on information his spies relayed) and take their monastery lands—the same tactics had been used 200 years before by Philip IV of France against the Knights Templar.

In July 1540, Walter Hungerford, 1st Baron Hungerford of Heytesbury, was charged with treason for harbouring a known member of the Pilgrimage of Grace movement. He was also accused of buggery, as he was suspected of raping his own daughter. Hungerford was beheaded at Tower Hill, on 28 July 1540, the same day as Thomas Cromwell.

Nicholas Udall, a cleric, playwright, and Headmaster of Eton College, was the first to be charged with violation of the Act alone in 1541, for sexually abusing his pupils. In his case, the sentence was commuted to imprisonment and he was released in less than a year. He went on to become headmaster of Westminster School.

=== 16th-century repeal and re-enactment ===
The act was repealed in 1553 on accession of the staunchly Catholic Queen Mary, who preferred such legal matters adjudicated in ecclesiastical courts. However, it was re-enacted by Queen Elizabeth I in 1562, by the Sodomy Act 1562 (5 Eliz. 1. c. 17), "An act for the punishment of the vice of buggery". Although "homosexual prosecutions throughout the sixteenth century [were] sparse" and "fewer than a dozen prosecutions are recorded up through 1660 ... this may reflect inadequate research into the subject, and a scarcity of extant legal records." In 1631 Mervyn Tuchet, 2nd Earl of Castlehaven, was beheaded because of his rank. Numerous prosecutions that resulted in a sentence of hanging are recorded in the 18th and early 19th centuries.

Even if the charge of sodomy was reduced for lack of evidence to a charge of attempted buggery, the penalty was severe: imprisonment and some time on the pillory. "The lesser punishment — to be stood in the pillory — was by no means a lenient one, for the victims often had to fear for their lives at the hands of an enraged multitude armed with brickbats as well as filth and curses ... the victims in the pillory, male or female, found themselves at the centre of an orgy of brutality and mass hysteria, especially if the victim were a molly."

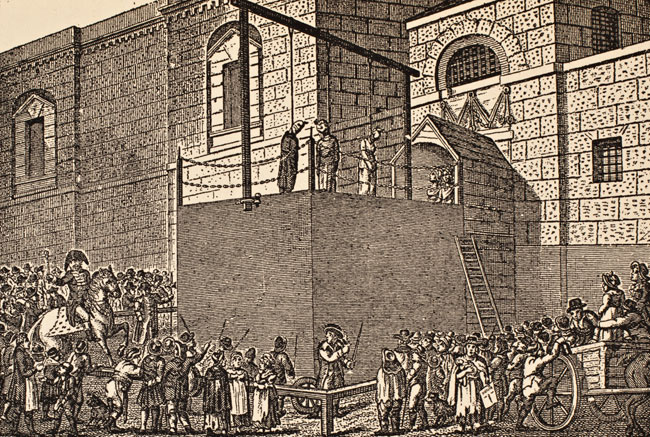
Execution outside Newgate Prison in London, early 19th century

Periodicals of the time sometimes casually named known sodomites, and at one point even suggested that sodomy was increasingly popular. This does not imply that sodomites necessarily lived in security.

In Rex v Samuel Jacobs (1817), it was concluded that fellatio between an adult man and an underage boy was not punishable under the act. The courts had previously established, in Rex v Richard Wiseman in 1716, that heterosexual sodomy was considered buggery under the meaning of the 1533 Act.

In light of R v Jacobs, fellatio thus remained lawful until the passage of the Labouchère Amendment in 1885, which added the charge of gross indecency to the traditional term of sodomy.

The last two Englishmen who were hanged for sodomy were executed in 1835, when James Pratt and John Smith died in front of the Newgate Prison in London on 27 November.

== Subsequent developments ==
The act was continued until the end of the next parliament by section 1 of the Continuance of Laws Act 1536 (28 Hen. 8. c. 6).

The act was continued until the end of the next parliament by section 1 of the Continuance of Laws Act 1539 (31 Hen. 8. c. 7).

The act was made perpetual by the Perpetuation of Laws Act 1540 (32 Hen. 8. c. 3).

The whole act was repealed by section 1 of the Offences Against the Person Act 1828 (9 Geo. 4. c. 31) and by section 125 of the Criminal Law (India) Act 1828 (9 Geo. 4. c. 74). It was replaced by section 15 of the Offences Against the Person Act 1828, and section 63 of the Criminal Law (India) Act 1828, which provided that buggery would continue to be a capital offence. The new Act expressly specified that conviction of buggery no longer required proof of completion ("emission of seed") and that evidence of penetration was sufficient for conviction.

Buggery remained a capital offence in England and Wales until the enactment of the Offences against the Person Act 1861 (24 & 25 Vict. c. 100).

The United Kingdom Parliament repealed buggery laws for England and Wales in 1967 (in so far as they related to consensual homosexual acts in private between people over the age of 21), ten years after the Wolfenden report. Jurisdictions in many former colonies have retained such legislation, as in the Anglophone Caribbean. Heterosexual sodomy, i.e. anal sex, remained a criminal offence, regardless of consent, until the Criminal Justice and Public Order Act 1994 decriminalised it for adults. In 2001, the age of consent for male homosexual acts and for heterosexual anal sex was reduced from 18 to 16, which is also the age of consent for all other types of sexual intercourse.

== See also ==
- Violence against LGBT people
- LGBT rights in the United Kingdom
- LGBT rights in the Commonwealth of Nations

=== Notable convictions under the act ===
- Walter Hungerford, 1st Baron Hungerford, 1540
- John Atherton, Bishop of Waterford, 1640
- Vere Street Coterie, 1810
- Percy Jocelyn, Bishop of Clogher, 1822
