= Submission of the Clergy =

The Submission of the Clergy was a process by which the Catholic Church in England gave up its power to formulate church laws without the King's licence and assent. It was passed first by the Convocation of Canterbury in 1532 and then by the Reformation Parliament in 1534. Along with other Acts passed by the Parliament, it further separated the Church from Rome.

== Convocation ==
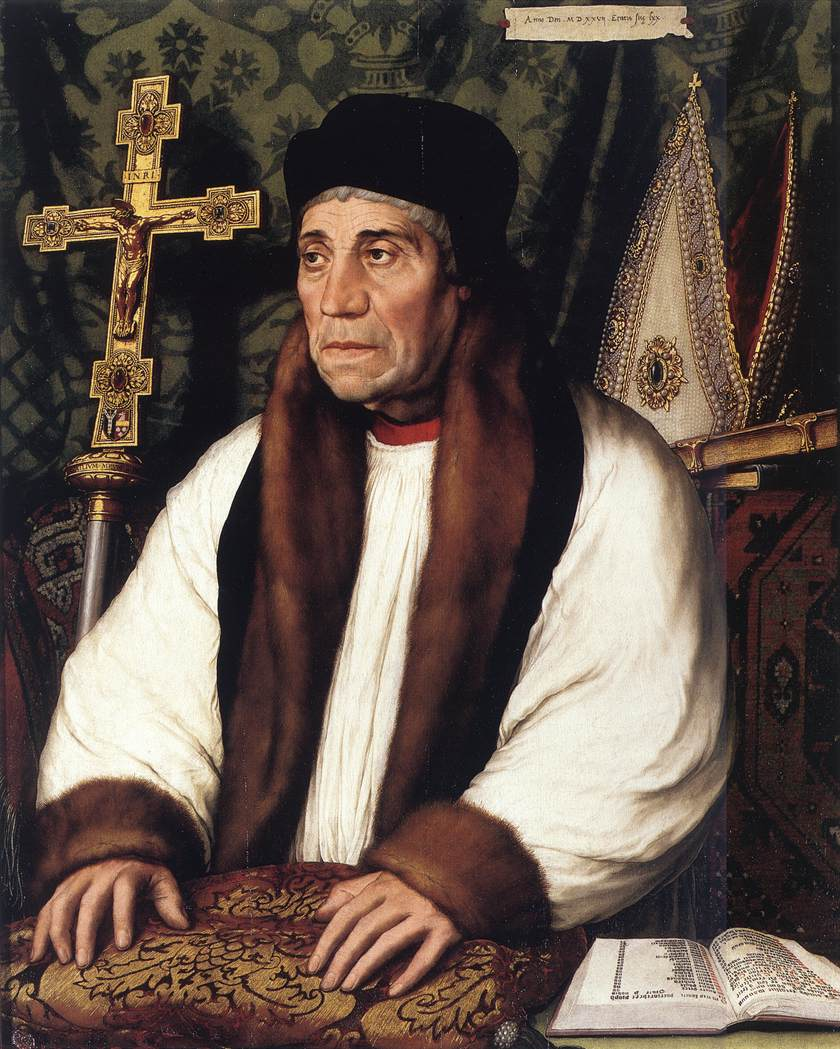
William Warham, the Archbishop of Canterbury, had to respond to the articles.

The Convocation of Canterbury met on 12 April 1532 after its last session ended in March. On 10 May Edward Foxe, the Bishop of Hereford, presented the Convocation with a schedule of three articles which King Henry VIII had sent to the Convocation for ratification. These articles said this:

- the Church of England was to renounce its authority to make church law (canons) without royal licence;
- the Convocation was to submit all existing canons to the scrutiny of a committee, which would be appointed by the King. Half of the members would be from Parliament (eight from each house) and half from the clergy. This committee would proclaim void all canons it found offensive;
- the Convocation was to retain the remaining canons with the King's consent.

After this was presented, William Warham, the Archbishop of Canterbury, immediately adjourned the Convocation to the remote chapel of St. Catherine, part of Westminster Abbey infirmary, where the articles were read again. Warham prorogued the formal session of the Convocation for three days and led the prelates to St Dunstan's chapel for a private conference on how to respond to the articles. John Fisher, the Bishop of Rochester, was not present so a delegation was sent to Rochester to ask him what he thought of the articles. Fisher, taking into account of his previous views, most probably argued firm resistance to the King's demands.

The Convocation was to meet again but the King, accompanied by his councillors in Parliament, made a speech attacking the clergy on 11 May. The chronicler Edward Hall recorded the King's speech:

Well beloved subjects, we thought that the clergy of our realm had been our subjects wholly, but now we have well perceived that they be but half our subjects, yea, and scarce our subjects; for all the prelates at their consecration make an oath to the Pope, clean contrary to the oath that they make to us, so that they seem to be his subjects, and not ours. The copy of both oaths I deliver here to you, requiring you to invent some order, that we be not thus deluded of our spiritual subjects.

Warham and the rest of the Convocation, after debate, suggested a compromise on the articles which consisted of the Convocation not making new canons without the King's consent and would submit all previous canons to the King himself for assent or rejection and not to a committee and that their legislative power would be ended 'during the King's natural life' only.

The King abruptly decreed that Warham should end the session and when the prelates met for the last time on 15 May Warham informed them of the King's decision and prorogued the Convocation until 4 November. Some of the King's most prominent councillors then arrived to demand that the clergy should agree to the articles without amendment. The councillors were the Duke of Norfolk, the Marquess of Exeter, the Earl of Oxford, the Earl of Wiltshire and William Sandys. After this confrontation, which lasted about an hour, the nobles left and the inferior clergy went to vote on the King's three articles. Eighteen of them voted 'no' to renouncing legislative authority, nineteen against the canons committee and to the third article. On receiving news of this rejection, Warham then advised the inferior clergy to retire because he thought the councillors might return at any moment. The Duke of Norfolk and a few others did return a few hours later but left after talking with Warham.

The Upper House of the Convocation voted on the articles with John Longland, the Bishop of Lincoln, Dr. Henry Standish, the Bishop of St. Asaph and John Stokesley, the Bishop of London speaking in favour of the articles but with some reservation. John Clerk, the Bishop of Bath and Wells was strongly opposed. A majority voted for the articles, and the Convocation was prorogued.

On 16 May, the Submission of the Clergy, as the three articles became known, was officially signed by representatives of the clergy and the bishops. The historian Michael Kelly, noting the scarce attendance of the vote, has written that the Submission was enacted by a "rump Convocation".

== Parliament ==
In 1534 the Submission of the Clergy was confirmed by Parliament in the Act for the Submission of the Clergy and Restraint of Appeals (25 Hen. 8 c. 19). The historian Stanford Lehmberg argues that the possible need for parliamentary legislation for this may have come from a proposal from the Commons, rather than Thomas Cromwell. The parliamentary procedure for this act resulted in a conference between the King and Parliament in which the Speaker addressed the King. In 1536 Parliament was asked again to re-enact the Submission of the Clergy, although the reasoning behind this decision is not known since the 1534 act did not include an expiration date.

== See also ==
- Submission of the Clergy Act 1533
