= Perpetuation of Laws Act 1540 =

Act of the Parliament of England

- Act of Parliament
- Parliament of England
- Long title: An Act for the Continuation of certain Acts.
- Citation: 32 Hen. 8. c. 3
- Territorial extent: England and Wales

Dates
- Royal assent: 24 July 1540
- Commencement: 12 April 1540 (Note: Start of session.)
- Repealed: 28 July 1863

Other legislation
- Amends: See § Continued enactments
- Repealed by: Statute Law Revision Act 1863
- Relates to: See Expiring laws continuance acts

Status: Repealed

Text of statute as originally enacted

The Perpetuation of Laws Act 1540 (32 Hen. 8. c. 3) was an act of the Parliament of England that made perpetual various older enactments.

== Background ==
In the United Kingdom, acts of Parliament remain in force until expressly repealed. Many acts of parliament, however, contained time-limited sunset clauses, requiring legislation to revive enactments that had expired or to continue enactments that would otherwise expire.

== Provisions ==
=== Continued enactments ===
Section 1 of the act made the Abjuration, etc. Act 1530 (22 Hen. 8. c. 14), the Benefit of Clergy Act 1531 (23 Hen. 8. c. 1), the Standing Mute, etc. Act 1533 (25 Hen. 8. c. 3), the Buggery Act 1533 (25 Hen. 8. c. 6) and the Abjuration (Benefit of Clergy) Act 1536 (28 Hen. 8. c. 1) perpetual.

Section 2 of the act provided that persons in holy orders who claimed benefit of clergy for felony should be branded on the hand and thereafter subject to the same punishments and forfeitures as laymen.

== Subsequent developments ==
The Select Committee on Temporary Laws, Expired or Expiring, appointed in 1796, inspected and considered all temporary laws, observing irregularities in the construction of expiring laws continuance acts, making recommendations and emphasising the importance of the Committee for Expired and Expiring Laws.

The whole act was repealed by section 1 of, and the schedule to, the Statute Law Revision Act 1863 (26 & 27 Vict. c. 125), which came into force on 28 July 1863.
