= Baron =

Title of nobility in Europe

The heraldic crown for Spanish barons

Baron is a rank of nobility or title of honour, often hereditary, in various European countries, either current or historical. The female equivalent is baroness. Often, barons hold their fief – their lands and income – directly from the monarch. Barons are less often the vassals of other nobles. In many kingdoms, they were entitled to wear a smaller form of a crown called a coronet.

The term originates from the Latin term barō, via Old French. The use of the title baron came to England via the Norman Conquest of 1066, then the Normans brought the title to Scotland and Southern Italy. It later spread to Scandinavian and Slavic lands.

== Etymology ==
The word baron comes from the Old French baron, from a Late Latin barō "man; servant, soldier, mercenary" (so used in Salic law; Alemannic law has barus in the same sense). The scholar Isidore of Seville in the 7th century thought the word was from Greek βᾰρῠ́ς "heavy" (because of the "heavy work" done by mercenaries), but the word is presumably of Old Frankish origin, cognate with Old English beorn meaning "warrior, nobleman". Cornutus in the first century already reports a word barones which he took to be of Gaulish origin. He glosses it as meaning servos militum and explains it as meaning "stupid", by reference to classical Latin bārō "simpleton, dunce"; because of this early reference, the word has also been suggested to derive from an otherwise unknown Celtic *bar, but the Oxford English Dictionary takes this to be "a figment".

== Britain and Ireland ==
In the Peerage of England, the Peerage of Great Britain, the Peerage of Ireland and the Peerage of the United Kingdom (but not in the Peerage of Scotland), barons form the lowest rank, placed immediately below viscounts. A woman of baronial rank has the title baroness. In the Kingdom of England, the medieval Latin word barō (genitive singular barōnis) was used originally to denote a tenant-in-chief of the early Norman kings who held his lands by the feudal tenure of "barony" (in Latin per barōniam), and who was entitled to attend the Great Council (Magnum Concilium) which by the 13th century had developed into the Parliament of England. Feudal baronies (or "baronies by tenure") are now obsolete in England and without any legal force, but any such historical titles are held in gross, that is to say are deemed to be enveloped within a more modern extant peerage title also held by the holder, sometimes along with vestigial manorial rights and tenures by grand serjeanty.

=== History ===
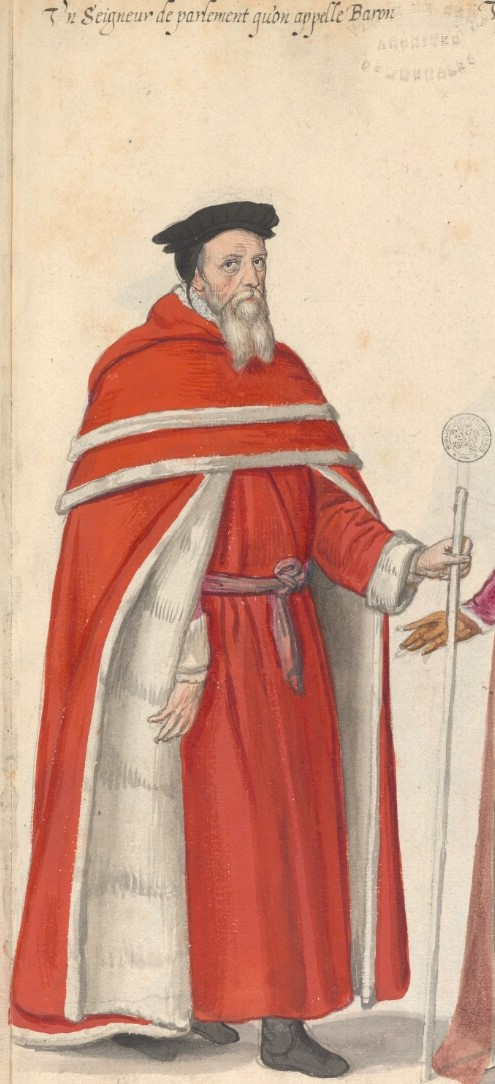
A lord of Parliament, also called a baron, illustrated in the manuscript "Théâtre de tous les peuples et nations de la terre avec leurs habits et ornemens divers, tant anciens que modernes, diligemment depeints au naturel". Painted by Lucas d'Heere in the second half of the 16th century. Preserved in the Ghent University Library.

After the Norman Conquest in 1066, the Norman dynasty introduced an adaptation of the French feudal system to the Kingdom of England. Initially, the term "baron" on its own was not a title or rank, but the "barons of the King" were the men of the king. Previously, in the Anglo-Saxon kingdom of England, the king's companions held the title of earl and in Scotland, the title of thane. All who held their feudal barony "in-chief of the king", that is with the king as his immediate overlord, became alike barones regis ("barons of the king"), bound to perform a stipulated annual military service and obliged to attend his council. The greatest of the nobles, especially those in the Marches, such as the Earls of Chester and the Bishops of Durham, whose territories were often deemed palatine, that is to say "worthy of a prince", might refer to their own tenants as "barons", where lesser magnates spoke simply of their "men" (homines) and lords of the manor might reference "bondmen".

Initially those who held land directly from the king by military service, from earls downwards, all bore alike the title of baron, which was thus the factor uniting all members of the ancient baronage as peers one of another. Under King Henry II, the Dialogus de Scaccario already distinguished between greater barons, who held per baroniam by knight's service, and lesser barons, who held manors. Thus in this historical sense, lords of manors are barons, or freemen; however they are not entitled to be styled as such. John Selden writes in Titles of Honour, "The word Baro (Latin for 'baron') hath been also so much communicated, that not only all Lords of Mannors have been from ancient time, and are at this day called sometimes Barons (as in the stile of their Court Barons, which is Curia Baronis, &c. And I have read hors de son Barony in a barr to an Avowry for hors de son fee) But also the Judges of the Exchequer have it from antient time fixed on them." Within a century of the Norman Conquest of 1066, as in the case of Thomas Becket in 1164, there arose the practice of sending to each greater baron a personal summons demanding his attendance at the King's Council, which evolved into the Parliament and later into the House of Lords, while as was stipulated in Magna Carta of 1215, the lesser barons of each county would receive a single summons as a group through the sheriff, and representatives only from their number would be elected to attend on behalf of the group. These representatives developed into the knights of the shire, elected by the county court presided over by the sheriff, who themselves formed the precursor of the House of Commons. Thus appeared a definite distinction, which eventually had the effect of restricting to the greater barons alone the privileges and duties of peerage.

Later, the king started to create new baronies in one of two ways: by a writ of summons directing a chosen man to attend Parliament, and in an even later development by letters patent. Writs of summons became the normal method in medieval times, displacing the method of feudal barony, but creation of baronies by letters patent is the sole method adopted in modern times.

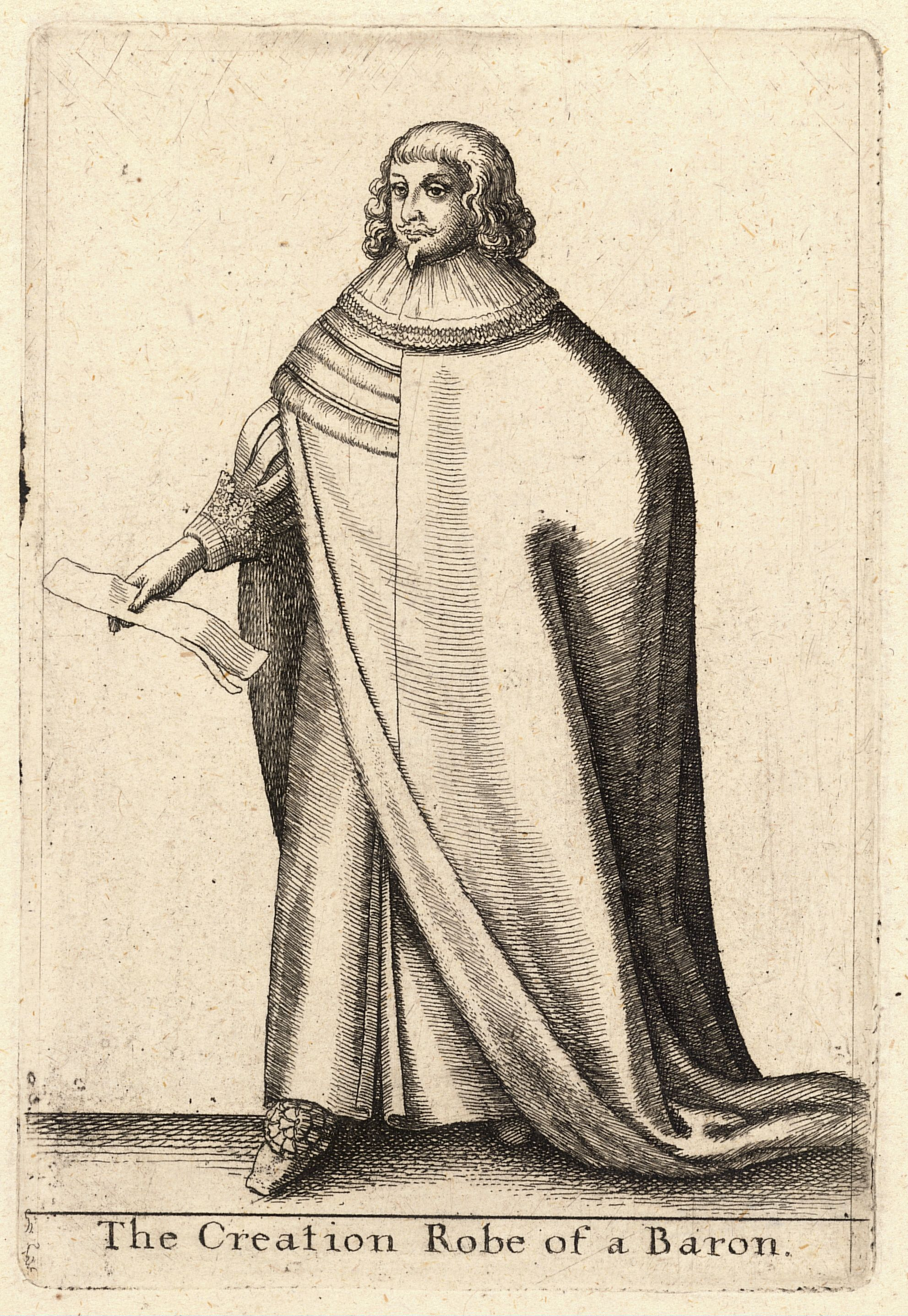
The robe worn by a baron during his creation ceremony in 17th-century Britain, engraved by Wenceslas Hollar.

Since the adoption of summons by writ, baronies thus no longer relate directly to land-holding, and thus no more feudal baronies needed to be created from then on. Following the Modus Tenendi Parliamenta of 1419, the Tenures Abolition Act 1660, the Feudal Tenure Act 1662, and the Fines and Recoveries Act 1834, titles of feudal barony became obsolete and without legal force. The Tenures Abolition Act 1660 specifically states: baronies by tenure were converted into baronies by writ. The rest ceased to exist as feudal baronies by tenure, becoming baronies in free socage, that is to say under a "free" (hereditable) contract requiring payment of monetary rents.

In the 20th century, Britain introduced the concept of non-hereditary life peers. All appointees to this distinction have, except for the Duke of Edinburgh, been at the rank of baron. In accordance with the tradition applied to hereditary peers, they too are formally addressed in parliament by their peers as "The Noble Lord".

In addition, baronies are often used by their holders as subsidiary titles, for example as courtesy titles for the son and heir of an Earl or higher-ranked peer. The Scottish baronial title tends to be used when a landed family is not in possession of any United Kingdom peerage title of higher rank, subsequently granted, or has been created a knight of the realm.

Several members of the royal family with the style of Royal Highness are also titled Barons. For example, William, Prince of Wales is also The Baron of Renfrew and The Baron Carrickfergus. Some non-royal Barons are related to the royal family; for example, Maurice Roche, 6th Baron Fermoy is William's first cousin once removed, through William's late mother, Diana, Princess of Wales, who was the 4th Baron Fermoy's granddaughter.

=== Irish barons ===
The title of baron (Irish: barún) was created in the Peerage of Ireland shortly after the Norman invasion of Ireland (1169). Ireland's first baronies included Baron Athenry (1172), Baron Offaly (c. 1193), Baron Kerry (1223), Baron Dunboyne (1324), Baron Gormanston (1365–70), Baron Slane (1370), Baron of Dunsany (1439), Baron Louth (c. 1458) and Baron Trimlestown (1461).

=== Coronet ===
Coronet of a British baron

A person holding a peerage in the rank of baron is entitled to a coronet bearing six pearls around the rim, equally spaced and all of equal size and height. The rim itself is neither jewelled nor "chased" (which is the case for the coronets of peers of higher degree).

The actual coronet is worn only for the coronation of a new monarch, but a baron can bear his coronet of rank on his coat of arms above the shield. In heraldry, the baron's coronet is shown with four of the balls visible.

=== Style of address ===
Formally, barons are styled The Right Honourable The Lord [Barony] and barons’ wives are styled The Right Honourable The Lady [Barony]. Baronesses in their own right, whether hereditary or for life, are either styled The Right Honourable The Baroness [Barony] or The Right Honourable The Lady [Barony], mainly based on personal preference (e.g. Lady Thatcher and Baroness Warsi, both life baronesses in their own right). Less formally, one refers to or addresses a baron as Lord [Barony] and his wife as Lady [Barony], and baronesses in their own right as Baroness [X] or Lady [X]. In direct address, barons and baronesses can also be referred to as My Lord, Your Lordship, or Your Ladyship or My Lady. The husband of a baroness in her own right gains no title or style from his wife.

The Right Honourable is frequently abbreviated to The Rt Hon. or Rt Hon. When referred to by the Sovereign in public instruments, The Right Honourable is changed to Our right trusty and well-beloved, with Counsellor attached if they are a Privy Counsellor.

Children of barons and baronesses in their own right, whether hereditary or for life, have the style The Honourable [Forename] [Surname]. After the death of the father or mother, the child may continue to use this style.

Courtesy barons are styled Lord [Barony], and their wives Lady [Barony]; the article "The" is always absent. If the courtesy baron is not a Privy Counsellor, the style The Right Honourable will also be absent.

It is very common for the surnames of barons and baronesses to be identical to or included in the formal title of their barony. However, when addressed as a peer, the title of Lord, Lady, or Baroness is followed by the name of his or her barony, not his personal name. This is relevant when a baron or baroness's title is completely different from his or her personal surname (e.g. William Thomson, Lord Kelvin) or includes a territorial designation in addition to his surname (e.g. Martin Rees, Lord Rees of Ludlow). This also means that including a baron or baroness's forename before his or her title is incorrect and potentially misleading. For example, "Lady Margaret Thatcher" (as opposed to "Lady Thatcher") would imply that she was the daughter of an earl, marquess, or duke, or a Lady Companion of the Garter or a Lady of the Thistle not holding a peerage rather than a baroness. Likewise, in the case of men, "Lord Digby Jones" (as opposed to "Lord Jones of Birmingham") would imply that he was the younger son of a marquess or duke rather than a baron.

The United Kingdom has a policy of including titles of nobility on passports: the title is entered into the surname field and a standard observation is recorded giving the holder's full name and title. A Baron would therefore record his surname as Lord [Barony], and the observation would note that The holder is The Right Honourable [given names] [surname] Lord [Barony]. However, if the title of an applicant's peerage is different from his surname, he can choose whether to use his surname or title in the surname field. A baroness in her own right would substitute "Baroness" for "Lord", and the wife of a Baron would similarly substitute "Lady". Titles of nobility are checked against Debrett's Peerage, Who's Who, or The London Gazette by the passport office on application.

=== Scottish barons ===
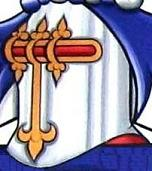
A Scottish baron's helmet.

In Scotland, the rank of baron is a rank of the ancient nobility of the Baronage of Scotland and refers to the holder of a barony, formerly a feudal superiority or prescriptive barony attached to land erected into a free barony by Crown Charter.

The Court of the Lord Lyon will officially recognise those possessing the dignity of baron on petition who meet certain criteria, and will grant them baronial arms with a helmet befitting their degree. Scottish barons rank below Lords of Parliament and while noble have the status of minor baron, being a non-Peerage rank; as such it can be transferred by either inheritance or assignation.

In showing that Scottish barons are titles of nobility, reference may be made, amongst others, to the Lyon Court in the Petition of Maclean of Ardgour for a Birthbrieve by Interlocutor dated 26 February 1943 which "Finds and Declares that the Minor Barons of Scotland are, and have both in this Nobiliary Court, and in the Court of Session, been recognised as 'titled' nobility, and that the estait of the Baronage (The Barones Minores) is of the ancient Feudal Nobility of Scotland".

Sir Thomas Innes of Learney, in his Scots Heraldry (2nd Ed., p. 88, note 1), states that "The Act 1672, cap 47, specially qualifies the degrees thus: Nobles (i.e. peers, the term being here used in a restricted seventeenth-century English sense), Barons (i.e. Lairds of baronial fiefs and their 'heirs', who, even if fiefless, are equivalent to heads of Continental baronial houses) and Gentlemen (apparently all other armigers)." Baronets and knights are evidently classed as 'Gentlemen' here and are of a lower degree than Barons.

The Scottish equivalent of an English baron is a Lord of Parliament.

==== Chapeau and helm ====
Scottish barons were entitled to a red cap of maintenance (chapeau) turned up ermine if petitioning for a grant or matriculation of a coat of arms between the 1930s and 2004. This chapeau is identical to the red cap worn by an English baron, but without the silver balls or gilt. This is sometimes depicted in armorial paintings between the shield and the helmet. Additionally, if the baron is the head of a family, he may include a chiefly coronet which is similar to a ducal coronet, but with four strawberry leaves. Because the chapeau was a relatively recent innovation, a number of ancient arms of Scottish feudal barons do not display the chapeau. Now, Scottish barons are principally recognised by the baron's helm, which in Scotland is a steel helmet with grille of three grilles, garnished in gold. Occasionally, the great tilting-helm garnished with gold is shown, or a helmet befitting a higher rank, if held.

==== Style of address ====
Scottish barons style their surnames similarly to Clan Chiefs if they own the caput, with the name of their barony following their name, as in John Smith of Edinburgh, Baron of Edinburgh otherwise John Smith, Baron of Edinburgh. Most formally, and in writing, they are styled as The Much Honoured Baron of Edinburgh. Their wives are styled Lady Edinburgh, or The Baroness of Edinburgh. The phrase Lady of Edinburgh is wrong if the lady in question does not hold a Scottish barony in her own right. Orally, Scottish barons may be addressed with the name of their barony, as in Edinburgh or else as Baron without anything else following, which if present would suggest a peerage barony. Informally, when referring to a Scots baron in the third person, the name Baron of [X] is used or simply [X].

Scottish Barons may record [surname] of [territorial designation] in the surname field of their passport, and an official observation would then note that The holder is [given names] [surname] Baron of [territorial designation]; applicants must provide evidence that the Lord Lyon has recognised their feudal barony, or else be included in Burke's Peerage.

== Continental Europe ==
=== France ===
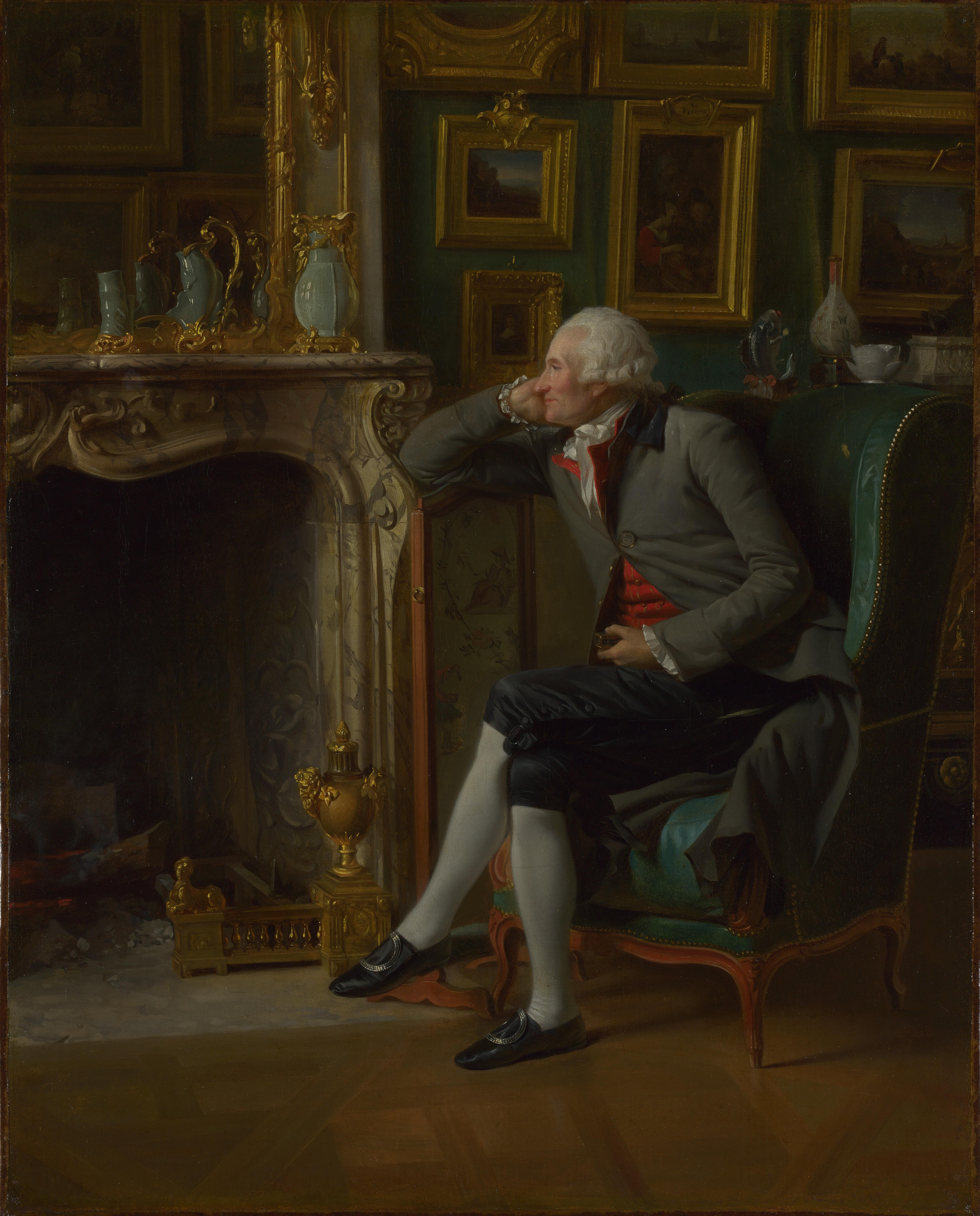
Pierre Victor, Baron de Besenval de Brunstatt, usually just referred to as Baron de Besenval (the suffix Brunstatt refers to the former barony), portrayed at the Hôtel de Besenval in 1791 by Henri-Pierre Danloux.

During the Ancien Régime, French baronies were very much like Scottish ones. Feudal landholders who possessed a barony were entitled to style themselves as a baron (French: baron) if they were nobles; a roturier (commoner) could only be a seigneur de la baronnie (lord of the barony).

French baronies could be sold freely until 1789, when the Constituent Assembly abolished feudal law. The title of baron was assumed as a titre de courtoisie by many nobles, whether members of the Nobles of the Robe or cadets of Nobles of the Sword who held no title in their own right.

==== Emperor Napoléon Bonaparte ====
Emperor Napoléon (r. 1804–1815) created a new imperial nobility in which baron appeared from 1808 as the second-lowest title. The titles were inherited through a male-only line of descent and could not be purchased.

==== King Louis XVIII ====
In 1815, King Louis XVIII created a new peerage system and a Chamber of Peers, based on the British model. Baron-peer was the lowest title, but the heirs to pre-1789 barons could remain barons, as could the elder sons of viscount-peers and the younger sons of count-peers. This peerage system was abolished in 1848.

=== Germany ===
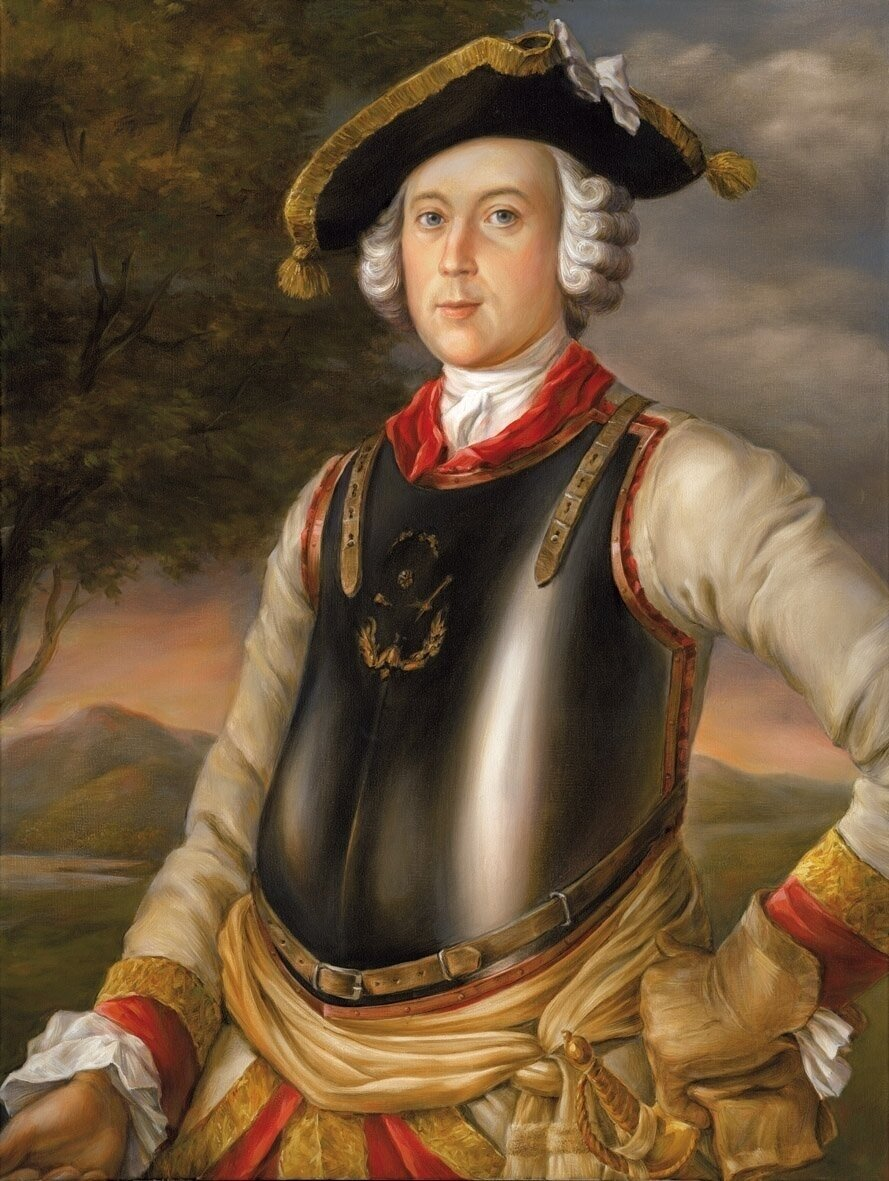
Baron Hieronymus von Münchhausen (1720–1797), on the basis of which Rudolf Erich Raspe wrote the tales of Baron Munchausen.

In pre-republican Germany all the knightly families of the Holy Roman Empire (sometimes distinguished by the prefix von or zu) eventually were recognised as of baronial rank, although Ritter is the literal translation for "knight", and persons who held that title enjoyed a distinct, but lower, rank in Germany's nobility than barons (Freiherren). The wife of a Freiherr (Baron) is called a Freifrau or sometimes Baronin, his daughter Freiin or sometimes Baroness.

Families which had always held this status were called Uradel ('primordial/ancient/original nobility'), and were heraldically entitled to a three-pointed coronet. Families which had been ennobled at a definite point in time (Briefadel or "nobility by patent") had seven points on their coronet. These families held their fief in vassalage from a suzerain. The holder of an allodial (i.e. suzerain-free) barony was thus called a Free Lord, or Freiherr. Subsequently, sovereigns in Germany conferred the title of Freiherr as a rank in the nobility, without implication of allodial or feudal status.

Since 1919, hereditary titles have had no legal status in Germany. In modern, republican Germany, Freiherr and Baron remain heritable only as part of the legal surname (and may thereby be transmitted to husbands, wives and children, without implication of nobility).

In Austria, hereditary titles have been completely banned. Thus, a member of the formerly reigning House of Habsburg or members of the former nobility would in most cases simply be addressed as Herr/Frau (Habsburg) in an official/public context, for instance in the media. Still, in both countries, honorary styles like "His/Her (Imperial/Royal) Highness", "Serenity", etc. persist in social use as a form of courtesy.

In Luxembourg and Liechtenstein (where German is the official language), barons remain members of the recognized nobility, and the sovereigns retain authority to confer the title (morganatic cadets of the princely dynasty received the title Baron of Lanskron, using both Freiherr and Baron for different members of this branch.)

Generally, all legitimate males of a German baronial family inherit the title Freiherr or Baron from birth, as all legitimate daughters inherit the title of Freiin or Baroness. As a result, German barons have been more numerous than those of such countries where primogeniture with respect to title inheritance prevails (or prevailed), such as France and the United Kingdom.

=== Italy ===
In Italy, barone was the lowest rank of feudal nobility except for that of signore or vassallo (lord of the manor). The title of baron was most generally introduced into southern Italy (including Sicily) by the Normans during the 11th century. Whereas originally a barony might consist of two or more manors, by 1700 we see what were formerly single manors erected into baronies, counties or even marquisates. Since the early 1800s, when feudalism was abolished in the various Italian states, it has often been granted as a simple hereditary title without any territorial designation or predicato. The untitled younger son of a baron is a nobile dei baroni and in informal usage might be called a baron, while certain baronies devolve to heirs male general. Since 1948 titles of nobility have not been recognised by the Italian state. In the absence of a nobiliary or heraldic authority in Italy there are, in fact, numerous persons who claim to be barons or counts without any basis for such claims. Baron and noble (nobile) are hereditary titles and, as such, could only be created or recognised by the kings of Italy or (before 1860) the pre-unitary Italian states such as the Two Sicilies, Tuscany, Parma or Modena, or by the Holy See (Vatican) or the Republic of San Marino. Beginning around 1800, a number of signori (lords of the manor) began to style themselves barone but in many cases this was not sanctioned legally by decree, while there was even less justification in the holder of any large (non-feudal) landed estate calling himself a baron. Nevertheless, both were common practices. In most of peninsular Italy the widespread medieval introduction of the title was Longobardic, while in Sicily and Sardinia it was coeval with Norman rule some centuries later, and one referred to the baronage when speaking of landed nobles generally. The heraldic coronet of an Italian baron is a jewelled rim of gold surmounted by seven visible pearls, set upon the rim directly or upon stems; alternately, the French style coronet (entwined in a string of small pearls, with or without four bigger visible pearls set upon the rim) is used.

=== Low Countries ===
In the medieval era, some allodial and enfeoffed lands held by nobles were created or recognised as baronies by the Holy Roman Emperors, within whose realm most of the Low Countries lay. Subsequently, the Habsburgs continued to confer the baronial title in the Southern Netherlands, first as kings of Spain and then, again, as emperors until abolition of the Holy Roman Empire, but these had become titular elevations rather than grants of new territory.

In the Netherlands after 1815, titles of baron (Dutch: baron (m), barones (f)) authorised by previous monarchs (except those of the Napoleonic Kingdom of Holland) were usually recognised by the Dutch kings. But such recognition was not automatic, having to be authenticated by the Supreme Council of Nobility and then approved by the sovereign. This ceased to be possible after the Dutch constitution was revised in 1983. More than one hundred Dutch baronial families have been recognised. The title is usually inherited by all males descended patrilineally from the original recipient of the title, although in a few noble families baron is the title of cadet family members, whilst in a few others it is heritable according to primogeniture.

After its secession in 1830, Belgium incorporated into its nobility all titles of baron borne by Belgian citizens, which had been recognised by the Netherlands since 1815. In addition, its monarchs have since created or recognised other titles of baron, and the sovereign continues to exercise the prerogative to confer baronial and other titles of nobility. Baron is the third lowest title within the nobility system above knight (French: chevalier, Dutch: ridder) and below viscount. There are still a number of families in Belgium that bear the title of baron.

Luxembourg's monarch retains the right to confer the baronial title. Two of the grand duchy's prime ministers inherited baronial titles that were used during their tenures in office, Victor de Tornaco and Félix de Blochausen.

=== Nordic countries ===
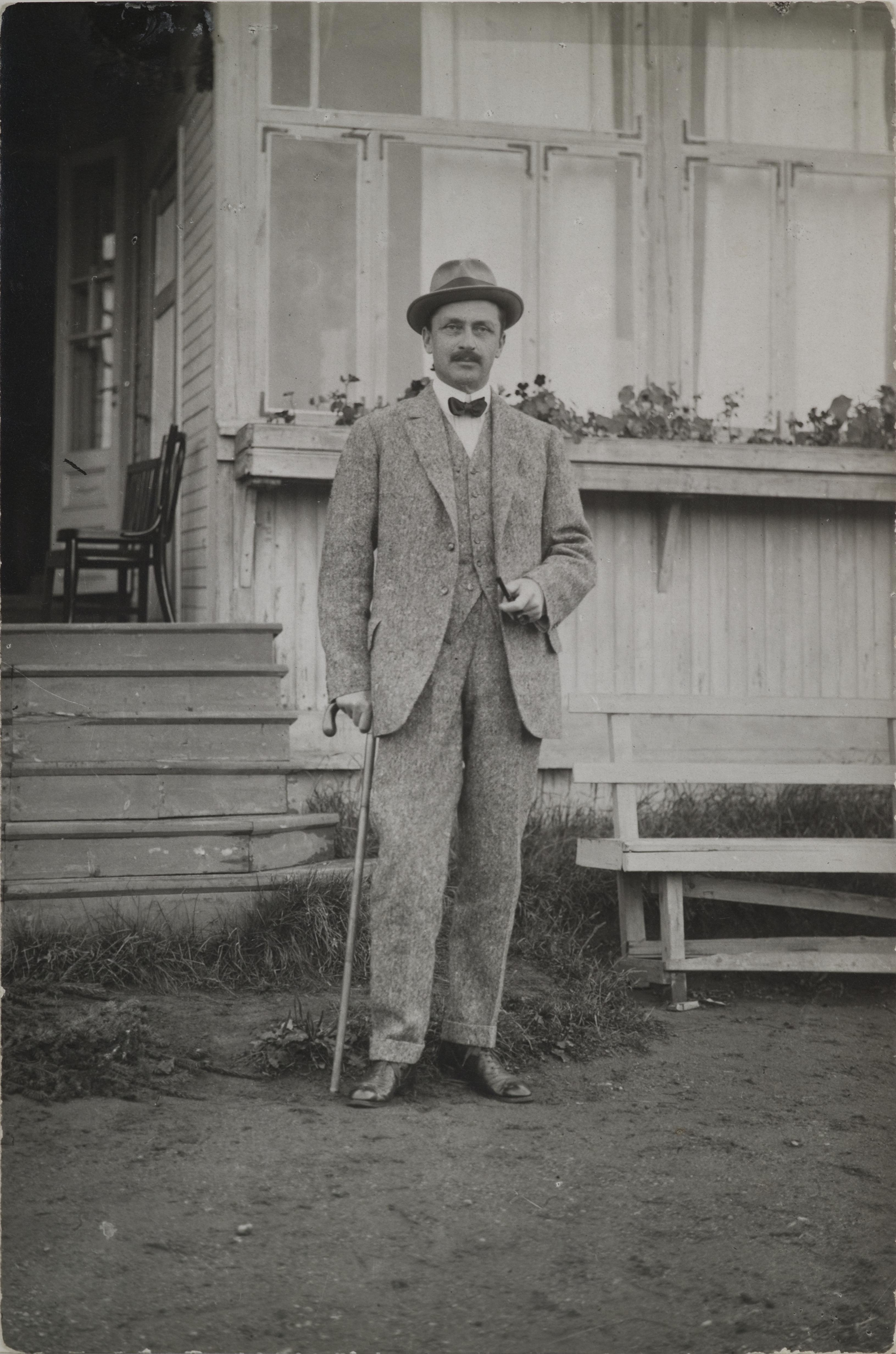
Baron C. G. E. Mannerheim in 1920

In Norway, king Magnus VI of Norway (1238–1280) replaced the title Lendmann with Baron, but in 1308 Haakon V abolished the title.

The present corresponding title is baron in the Danish nobility and the Norwegian nobility, friherre in the Swedish nobility (baron is used orally, while it is written as friherre), and vapaaherra in the nobility of Finland.

In the beginning, Finnish nobles were all without honorific titulature, and known simply as lords. Since the Middle Ages, each head of a noble family had been entitled to a vote in any of Finland's provincial diets whenever held, as in the realm's House of Nobility of the Riksdag of the Estates. In 1561, Sweden's King Eric XIV granted the hereditary titles of count and vapaaherra to some of these, but not all. Although their cadet family members were not entitled to vote or sit in the Riksdag, they were legally entitled to the same title as the head of the family, but in customary address they became Paroni or Paronitar. Theoretically, in the 16th and 17th centuries, families elevated to vapaaherra status were granted a barony in fief, enjoying some rights of taxation and judicial authority. Subsequently, the "barony" was titular, usually attached to a family property, which was sometimes entailed. Their exemptions from taxes on landed properties continued into the 20th century, although in the 19th century tax reforms narrowed this privilege. Nobility creations continued until 1917, the end of Finland's grand ducal monarchy.

=== Russia ===
Muscovite Russia had no traditional baronial titles of its own; they were introduced in early Imperial Russia by Peter the Great. In the hierarchy of nobility introduced by Peter the Great, barons (барон) ranked above untitled nobility and below counts (граф, graf). The styles "Your Well-born" (Ваше благородие, Vashe blagorodiye) and "Master Baron" (Господин барон, Gospodin baron) were used to address a Russian baron.

There were two main groups of nobility which held the baronial title. One was the Baltic German nobility, for which Russia merely recognised their pre-existing titles; the other was new barons created by the Emperors of Russia after 1721. Like in many other countries, new baronial titles were often created by ennoblement of rich bourgeoisie. The title of baron, along with the rest of the noble hierarchy, was abolished in December 1917 after the Bolshevik Revolution; however, certain leaders of the White movement like Baron Pyotr Wrangel and Roman von Ungern-Sternberg continued to use the title until the end of the Russian Civil War.

=== Spain ===
In Spain, the title follows Vizconde in the noble hierarchy, and ranks above Señor. Baronesa is the feminine form, for the wife of a baron or for a woman who has been granted the title in her own right. In general, titles of baron created before the 19th century originate from the Crown of Aragon. Barons lost territorial jurisdiction around the middle of the 19th century, and from then on the title became purely honorific. Although most barons have not held the rank of grandeza as well, the title has been conferred in conjunction with the grandeza. The sovereign continues to grant baronial titles.

== Other ==
Like other major Western noble titles, baron is sometimes used to render certain titles in non-Western languages with their own traditions, even though they are necessarily historically unrelated and thus hard to compare, which are considered 'equivalent' in relative rank. This is the case with China's nanjue (nan-chueh) (Chinese: 男爵), hereditary title of nobility of the fifth rank, as well as its derivatives and adaptations.

| Country or region | Equivalent to baron |
|---|---|
| China | Nánjué (男爵) |
| India | Rao |
| Japan | danshaku (hiragana: だんしゃく, kanji: 男爵) |
| Korea | namjak (Korean: 남작, 男爵) |
| Lebanon | Reis |
| Manchu | ashan-i hafan |
| Vietnam | nam tước (Chữ Hán: 男爵) |
| Hungary | Báró |
| Székely | primor, historically used among a specific population of Hungarians in Transylvania |
| Croatia | Barun |
| Romania | Baron (female: baronesă). |
| Portugal | Barão (female: baronesa). |
| Serbia | Bojar or Boyar |
| Georgia | Tahtis Aznauri |
| Thailand | Khun |

In some republics of continental Europe, the unofficial title of "Baron" retains a purely social prestige, with no particular political privileges.

In Armenian, the word "Baron" should not be confused with the similar word "Paron" (Armenian: Պարոն), which is a title given to ordinary men, equivalent to 'Sir' or 'Mr'. In Latvian, the term used by the Baltic German nobility is barons (female: baronese), although since the 19th century brīvkungs (brīvkundze), a translation of Freiherr began to gain popularity.

In the Polynesian island monarchy of Tonga, as opposed to the situation in Europe, barons are granted this imported title (in English), alongside traditional chiefly styles, and continue to hold and exercise some political power.

== In fiction ==
Barons and baronesses have appeared in various works of fiction. For examples of fictional barons and baronesses, see List of fictional nobility#Barons and baronesses.

== See also ==
- Irish feudal barony
- List of baronies in the peerages of the British Isles
- Marcher Lord
- Honour (feudal land tenure)
- List of barons in the peerages of Britain and Ireland
- Robber baron (feudalism)
- Boyar - Slavic feudal title

== Sources ==
- Sanders, I. J. English Baronies: A Study of their Origin and Descent, 1086–1327. Clarendon Press, 1960.
- Round, J. Horace, "The House of Lords", published in: Peerage and Pedigree, Studies in Peerage Law and Family History, Vol.1, London, 1910, pp. 324–362
- Heraldica
- Chisholm, Hugh, ed. (1911). "Baron" . Encyclopædia Britannica. Vol. 3 (11th ed.). Cambridge University Press. pp. 421–423.
