= Standing Mute, etc. Act 1533 =

Act of the Parliament of England

- Act of Parliament
- Parliament of England
- Long title: An Act for standing mute, and peremptory Challenge.
- Citation: 25 Hen. 8. c. 3
- Territorial extent: England and Wales

Dates
- Royal assent: 30 March 1534
- Commencement: 15 January 1534 (Note: Start of session.)
- Repealed: 26 May 1826
Other legislation
Amended by	Perpetuation of Laws Act 1540
Repealed by	Criminal Law Act 1826
Relates to	Benefit of Clergy Act 1531

Status: Repealed

Text of statute as originally enacted

The Standing Mute, etc. Act 1533 (25 Hen. 8. c. 3) was an act of the Parliament of England that stated that anyone who refused to plead in a criminal trial would not be eligible for benefit of clergy.

== Subsequent developments ==
The act was made perpetual by the Perpetuation of Laws Act 1540 (32 Hen. 8. c. 3).

The whole act was repealed by section 32 of the Criminal Law Act 1826 (7 Geo. 4. c. 64), which came into force on 26 May 1826.
