= Cestui que vie Act 1540 =

Act of the Parliament of England

Cestui que vie Act 1540 (Note: The citation of this act by this short title was authorised by section 5 of, and the second schedule to, the Statute Law Revision Act 1948. Due to the repeal of those provisions, it is now authorised by section 19(2) of the Interpretation Act 1978.)
- Act of Parliament
- Parliament of England
- Long title: For recovering of Arrerages by Executors & Administrators. (Note: These words are printed against this act in the second column of the second schedule to the Statute Law Revision Act 1948, which is headed "Title".)
- Citation: 32 Hen. 8. c. 37
- Territorial extent: England and Wales

Dates
- Royal assent: 24 July 1540
- Commencement: 12 April 1540 (Note: Start of session.)
- Repealed: 1 January 1970

Other legislation
- Amended by: Statute Law Revision Act 1888
- Repealed by: Administration of Estates Act 1925; Statute Law Revision Act 1948; Statute Law (Repeals) Act 1969

Status: Repealed

Text of statute as originally enacted

The Cestui que vie Act 1540 (32 Hen. 8. c. 37) was an act of the Parliament of England.

== Subsequent developments ==
Sections 1 to 3 were repealed by section 56 of, and part I of schedule 2 to, the Administration of Estates Act 1925 (15 & 16 Geo. 5. c. 23), which came into force on 1 January 1926.

The words from "and the avowry" to the end of the act were repealed by section 1 of, and the first schedule to, the Statute Law Revision Act 1948 (11 & 12 Geo. 6. c. 62), which came into force on 30 July 1948.

The whole act, so far as unrepealed, was repealed by section 1 of, and part III of the schedule to, the Statute Law (Repeals) Act 1969, which came into force on 1 January 1970.
