= Helen of Tottenham =

Helen of Tottenham was an English visionary associated with Elizabeth Barton, during the reign of Henry VIII. Barton described Helen's visions as 'delusions of the devil.' She came to the attention of Thomas More, who wrote about her.
