= Treasons in Wales Act 1540 =

Act of the Parliament of England

- Act of Parliament
- Parliament of England
- Long title: An Act for Trial of Treasons in Wales.
- Citation: 32 Hen. 8. c. 4
- Territorial extent: England and Wales

Dates
- Royal assent: 24 July 1540
- Commencement: 12 April 1540 (Note: Start of session.)
- Repealed: 28 July 1863

Other legislation
- Repealed by: Statute Law Revision Act 1863

Status: Repealed

Text of statute as originally enacted

The Treasons in Wales Act 1540 (32 Hen. 8. c. 4) was an act of the Parliament of England that gave to commissioners the authority to try citizens for treason committed in Wales "or where the King's writ runneth not."

== Subsequent developments ==
The whole act was repealed by section 1 of, and the schedule to, the Statute Law Revision Act 1863 (26 & 27 Vict. c. 125), which came into force on 28 July 1863.

== See also ==
- High treason in the United Kingdom
