= Act Concerning Strangers 1540 =

Act of the Parliament of England

Aliens Act 1540
- Act of Parliament
- Parliament of England
- Long title: An Act concerning Strangers.
- Citation: 32 Hen 8. c. 16

Dates
- Royal assent: 24 July 1540
- Commencement: 1 September 1540 (Note: Section 1.)
- Repealed: 28 July 1863

Other legislation
- Repealed by: Statute Law Revision Act 1863

Status: Repealed

Text of statute as originally enacted

The Act Concerning Strangers 1540 (32 Hen. 8. c.16) was an act of the Parliament of England that restricted most migrants from working and migrants were regularly prosecuted for breaching this restriction.

== Subsequent developments ==
The whole act was repealed by section 1 of, and the schedule to, the Statute Law Revision Act 1863 (26 & 27 Vict. c. 125), which came into force on 28 July 1863.
