= Queen Consort Act 1540 =

Act of the Parliament of England

Queen Consort Act 1540 (Note: The citation of this act by this short title was authorised by section 5 of, and the second schedule to, the Statute Law Revision Act 1948. Due to the repeal of those provisions, it is now authorised by section 19(2) of the Interpretation Act 1978.)
- Act of Parliament
- Parliament of England
- Long title: The Kinges aucthoritie to make Joyntures & to geve landes to the Prince, &c. (Note: These words are printed against this act in the second column of the second schedule to the Statute Law Revision Act 1948, which is headed "Title".)
- Citation: 32 Hen. 8. c. 51 (Note: This is the citation in The Statutes of the Realm.); 32 Hen. 8. c. 12 Pr. (Note: This is the citation in The Statutes at Large.)
- Territorial extent: England and Wales

Dates
- Royal assent: 24 July 1540
- Commencement: 12 April 1540 (Note: Start of session.)
- Repealed: 1 January 1970

Other legislation
- Repealed by: Statute Law Revision Act 1863; Statute Law (Repeals) Act 1969

Status: Repealed

Text of statute as originally enacted

The Queen Consort Act 1540 (32 Hen. 8. c. 51) was an act of the Parliament of England.

== Subsequent developments ==
Section 2 of the act was repealed by section 1 of, and the schedule to, the Statute Law Revision Act 1863 (26 & 27 Vict. c. 125), which came into force on 28 July 1863.

The whole act, so far as unrepealed, was repealed by section 1 of, and part III of the schedule to, the Statute Law (Repeals) Act 1969, which came into force on 1 January 1970.
