= Treason Act 1540 =

Act of the Parliament of England

- Act of Parliament
- Parliament of England
- Long title: An Act declaring the Dissolution of the King's pretensed Marriage with the Lady Anne of Cleves.
- Citation: 32 Hen. 8. c. 25
- Territorial extent: England and Wales

Dates
- Royal assent: 24 July 1540
- Commencement: 12 April 1540 (Note: Start of session.)
- Repealed: 30 July 1948
Other legislation
Repealed by	Statute Law Revision Act 1948

Status: Repealed

Text of statute as originally enacted

The Treason Act 1540 (32 Hen. 8. c. 25) was an act of the Parliament of England. Its long title was "An Act declaring the Dissolution of the King's pretensed Marriage with the Lady Anne of Cleves."

The act confirmed that the marriage between King Henry VIII and Anne of Cleves was annulled. They had married on 6 January 1540, but Henry had had the marriage annulled on 9 July of the same year. The act also made it high treason for anyone "by word or deed, to accept, take, judge, or believe the said marriage to be good, or to procure or do any thing to the repeal of this act."

== Subsequent developments ==
The whole act was repealed by section 1 of, and the schedule to, the Statute Law Revision Act 1948 (11 & 12 Geo. 6. c. 62).

== See also ==
- High treason in the United Kingdom
- Treason Act
