= Physicians Act 1540 =

Act of the Parliament of England

Physicians Act 1540 (Note: The citation of this act by this short title was authorised by section 5 of, and the second schedule to, the Statute Law Revision Act 1948. Due to the repeal of those provisions, it is now authorised by section 19(2) of the Interpretation Act 1978.)
- Act of Parliament
- Parliament of England
- Long title: An Act Concerning Phisicians. (Note: These words are printed against this act in the second column of the second schedule to the Statute Law Revision Act 1948, which is headed "Title".)
- Citation: 32 Hen. 8. c. 40
- Territorial extent: England and Wales

Dates
- Royal assent: 24 July 1540
- Commencement: 12 April 1540 (Note: Start of session.)
- Repealed: 1 January 1957

Other legislation
- Amended by: Statute Law Revision Act 1888; Food and Drugs Act 1938
- Repealed by: Medical Act 1956

Status: Repealed

Text of statute as originally enacted

The Physicians Act 1540 (32 Hen. 8. c. 40) was an act of the Parliament of England.

== Subsequent developments ==
Sections 2 and 3 of the act were repealed by section 101(1) of, and the first part of the fourth schedule to, the Food and Drugs Act 1938 (1 & 2 Geo. 6. c. 56), which came into force on 1 October 1939.

The whole act was repealed by section 57(1) of, and the fifth schedule to, the Medical Act 1956 (4 & 5 Eliz. 2. c. 76), which came into force on 1 January 1957.
