= Medical Act 1956 =

Act of the Parliament of the United Kingdom

Medical Act 1956 (Note: Section 58(1).)
- Act of Parliament
- Parliament of the United Kingdom
- Long title: An Act to consolidate certain enactments relating to medical practitioners with corrections and improvements made under the Consolidation of Enactments (Procedure) Act, 1949.
- Citation: 4 & 5 Eliz. 2. c. 76
- Territorial extent: United Kingdom

Dates
- Royal assent: 5 November 1956
- Commencement: 1 January 1957 (Note: Section 58(2).)
- Repealed: 26 October 1983
Other legislation
Amends	See § Repealed enactments
Repeals/revokes	See § Repealed enactments
Amended by	Medical Act 1956 (Amendment) Act 1958; Medicines Act 1968; Medical Act 1969; Statute Law (Repeals) Act 1974; Medical Act 1978; Interpretation Act 1978
Repealed by	Medical Act 1983

Status: Repealed

Text of statute as originally enacted

The Medical Act 1956 (4 & 5 Eliz. 2. c. 76) was an act of the Parliament of the United Kingdom that consolidated enactments relating to medical practitioners in the United Kingdom.

== Provisions ==
=== Repealed enactments ===
Section 57(1) of the act repealed 20 enactments, listed in the fifth schedule to the act.

Citation	Short title	Extent of repeal
32 Hen. 8. c. 40	Physicians Act 1540	The whole act..
21 & 22 Vict. c. 90	Medical Act 1858	Sections two to forty-six; section fifty-five; and Schedules (A) and (D).
22 Vict. c. 21	Medical Act 1859	The whole act..
23 Vict. c. 7	Medical Acts Amendment Act 1860	The whole act..
25 & 26 Vict. c. 91	Medical Act 1862	The whole act..
37 & 38 Vict. c. 34	Apothecaries Act Amendment Act 1874	Section three.
39 & 40 Vict. c. 40	Medical Practitioners Act 1876	The whole act..
49 & 50 Vict. c. 48	Medical Act 1886	Sections two to five; in section six the words "in the United Kingdom and"; sections seven to twenty-four; in section twenty-seven the words "except where the context otherwise requires" and the definitions other than that of "local law" and "person".
63 & 64 Vict. c. xix	Birmingham University Act 1900	Sections nine and ten.
3 Edw. 7. c. ccxxxii	Liverpool University Act 1903	Sections ten and eleven.
4 Edw. 7. c. xxxv	University of Leeds Act 1904	Sections eight and nine.
5 Edw. 7. c. 14	Medical Act (1886) Amendment Act 1905	The whole act..
5 Edw. 7. c. clii	University of Sheffield Act 1905	Sections seven and eight.
7 Edw. 7. c. xxii	Apothecaries Act 1907	Section five.
8 Edw. 7. c. 38	Irish Universities Act 1908	Section eleven.
9 Edw. 7. c. xlii	University of Bristol Act 1909	Sections seven and eight.
1 & 2 Geo. 5. c. 43	University of Wales (Medical Graduates) Act 1911	The whole act..
17 & 18 Geo. 5. c. 39	Medical and Dentists Acts Amendment Act 1927	In section one, the words from "and so far as" in subsection (1) to the end of the section; in section three, subsections (2), (4) and (5).
11 & 12 Geo. 6. c. 11	Medical Practitioners and Pharmacists Act 1947	Section eight.
14 Geo. 6. c. 29	Medical Act 1950	Sections one to five; in section six, subsections (1) and (2), in subsection (3), paragraphs (a) and (b) and the words "but not further" and subsections (4) to (7); sections seven to twenty-four; subsection (1) of section twenty-five; sections twenty-six to twenty-eight and thirty and thirty-two; in section thirty-four, in subsection (1), the words "on the Lord Chancellor to make rules and", subsection (2), in subsection (3) and subsection (4) the words from "other than" to "day"; section thirty-five, except the words in subsection (4) from "for the purpose" to the end; sections thirty-six and thirty-seven; subsection (2) of section thirty-eight; the First Schedule; the Second Schedule, except the entry relating to the Medical Practitioners and Pharmacists Act, 1947, in the first column and the words from the beginning to "by virtue of section eleven" in the corresponding entry in the second column.

== Subsequent developments ==
Section 57(1) of, and schedule 5 to, the act were repealed by section 1 of, and part XI of the schedule to, the Statute Law (Repeals) Act 1974, which came into force on 27 June 1974.

The whole act was repealed by section 56(2) of, and part I of schedule 7 to, the Medical Act 1983, which came into force on 26 October 1983.
