= SS Maid of Kent =

British ferry later converted hospital ship

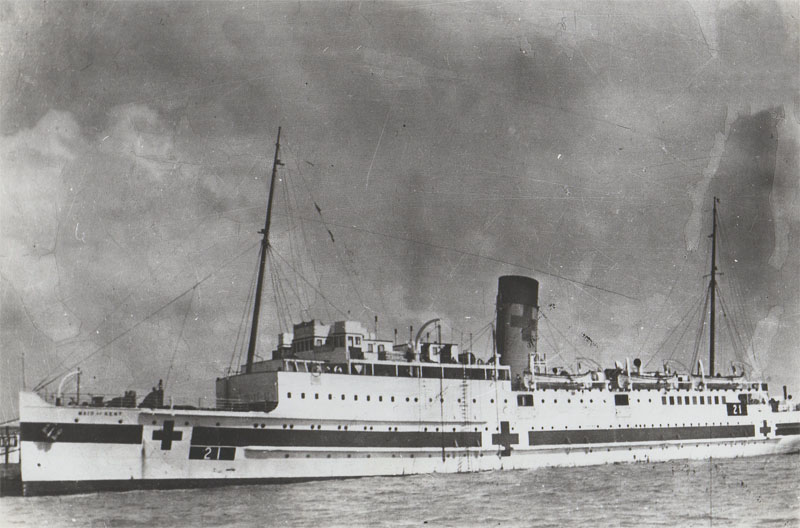
- HMHS Maid of Kent as a hospital ship between 1939 and 1940.

History

United Kingdom
- Name: SS Maid of Kent
- Namesake: Maid of Kent
- Owner: Southern Railway Company, London; (1925–1939); Royal Navy; (1939–1940)
- Ordered: 1924
- Builder: William Denny and Brothers, Dumbarton
- Yard number: 1174
- Laid down: 1925
- Launched: 5 August 1925
- Commissioned: 26 October 1925
- Reclassified: HMHS Maid of Kent (No.21)
- Identification: Callsign: GBR, GLNS
- Fate: Sunk by Luftwaffe in 1940.

General characteristics
- Type: Ferry; Hospital ship
- Displacement: 2657 tons (minimum); 2693 tons (maximum)
- Length: 104.24 m (342 ft 0 in)
- Beam: 45.1 m (148 ft 0 in)
- Draft: 12 ft 10 in (3.91 m)
- Depth: 17.1 m (56 ft 1 in)
- Installed power: 4x Parsons turbines 800 kW each; 2x shafts
- Speed: 22 knots (41 km/h)
- Boats & landing craft carried: 8 x Lifeboats
- Capacity: 1400

SS Maid of Kent was a British passenger ferry and later converted to a hospital ship. She was named after Elizabeth Barton.

== Construction and career ==
She was laid down, launched and commissioned in 1925. She was owned by Southern Railway Company, London. On 26 October, she was delivered to Southampton. SS Maid of Kent replaced her sister ship Isle of Thanet, which was transferred to Folkestone on 6 November.

On 9 March 1926, she accidentally rammed the Southern Breakwater at Dover which caused damage to her bow.

SS Maid of Kent made her way to Folkestone as soon the United Kingdom declared war on Germany. She was taken over by the Royal Navy and designated as a hospital ship and made her way from Newhaven to Dieppe. Throughout May 1940 she made several trips to and back carrying hundreds of wounded. On 18 May, a bomb dropped nearby HMHS Maid of Kent but she was unable to relocate; three days later on 21 May, a bomb from the Luftwaffe air raid hit her engine room causing a fire aboard the ship. A total of 28 merchant crew and medical staff died in the tragedy.

The ship sank that day but was later raised by the Germans and moved into deeper water.

== Gallery ==
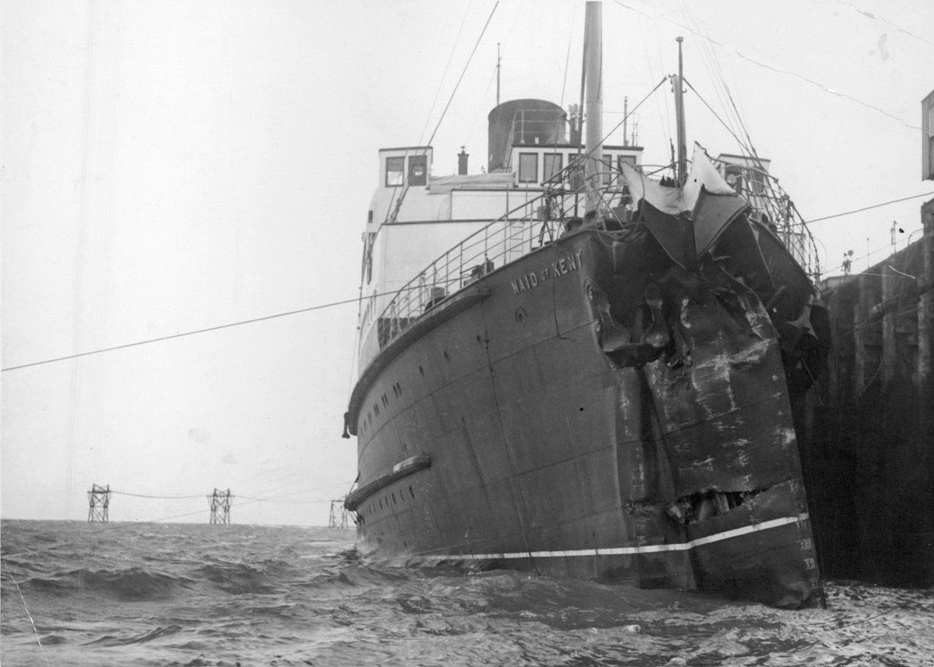
SS Maid of Kent after colliding with the breakwater in 1926.

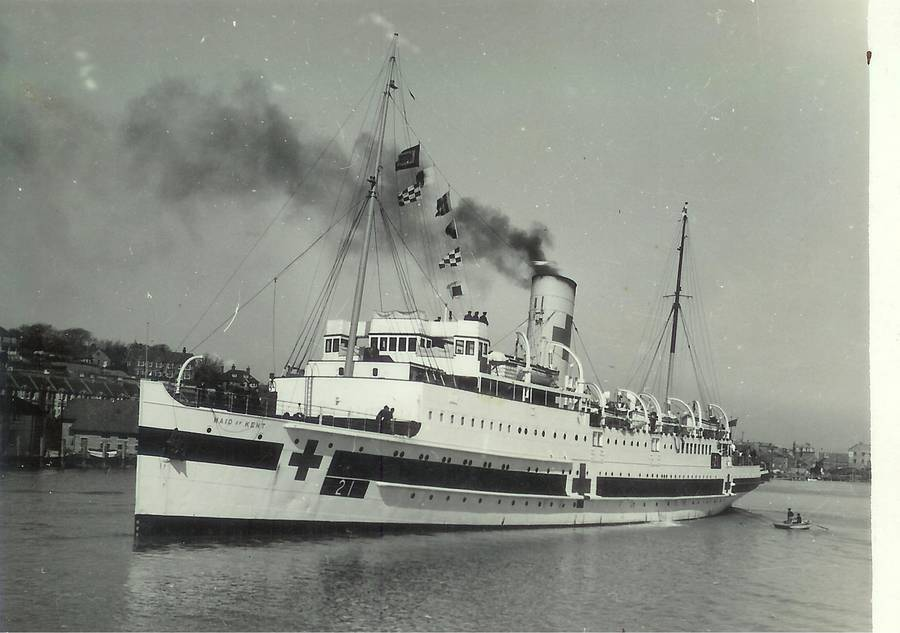
HMHS Maid of Kent between 1939 and 1940.
