= Edward Bocking =

English monk

Edward Bocking (died 1534) was a Benedictine monk executed in 1534. He was the confessor and spiritual adviser of Elizabeth Barton, "The Holy Maid of Kent", a popular seer who spoke out against the marriage of King Henry VIII to Anne Boleyn. The extent to which he may have influenced Barton's prophecies and pronouncements is unclear.

== Life ==
Edward Bocking attended Canterbury College, Oxford where he received a B.D. in 1513 and a D.D. in 1518. He served as the Warden there for a period of time.

Bocking became a monk in 1526. He was serving as the cellarer of Christ Church Priory, in Canterbury, when at the request of Archbishop William Warham, the prior sent him with others to assess the credibility of Elizabeth Barton, "The Holy Maid of Kent", and her alleged divine revelations. Initially, she urged people to pray to the Blessed Virgin Mary and to undertake pilgrimages. After one of her usual trances she declared that the Blessed Virgin had directed her to enter some religious community, and Archbishop William Warham arranged for her to enter the Benedictine Monastery of St. Selpulchre near Canterbury. Bocking became her confessor. According to George C Alston, writing in the Catholic Encyclopedia, Bocking is said to have induced her to declare herself an inspired emissary for the overthrow of Protestantism and the prevention of the divorce of Queen Catherine.

When the King began the process of obtaining an annulment of his marriage to Catherine of Aragon and seizing control of the Church in England from Rome, Barton began to prophesy against the royal policies. Bocking caused a collection of her oracles compiled under his direction to be widely circulated in manuscript.

After the divorce of Queen Catherine and Henry's marriage to Anne Boleyn in 1533, Cromwell had Elizabeth Barton arrested. Bocking was arrested in August 1533. In November, 1533 Bocking, Barton and others were made to mount a scaffold at St Paul's Cross to do public penance for promoting "superstition" and "disloyalty". They were then led through the streets to the Tower of London.

Eustace Chapuys, Imperial ambassador for Charles V, Holy Roman Emperor, nephew of Queen Catherine of Aragon, noted that there was some difficulty in obtaining a conviction for treason, and the trial ended without a sentence. In January 1534, indictments were drawn for a second trial, but Thomas Cromwell decided instead to seek a bill of attainder. According to Francis Aidan Gasquet, since the names of those attainted was not immediately released, those who early had supported Barton, did not offer any objection, and some offered Cromwell money in exchange for pardons.

Bocking and the others were not given an opportunity to address the charges; Parliament based its ruling on documentation supplied by the King's council. Bocking, together with Barton and six others, was hanged and beheaded for treason at Tyburn on 20 April 1534. His body was buried in the London cemetery of the Dominican Friars but his head was mounted above one of the city gates.

Alston indicates that Barton's purported visions of declaiming against the King's marriage to Anne Boleyn were instigated and promoted by Bocking for his own purposes. Sidney Lee characterizes Barton's pronouncements as the result of an "hysterical disorder" and the undue influence of Bocking, who took advantage of it. Gasquet allows that she may herself have believed them, and that at a time when there was widespread opposition to the marriage, it was necessary for the Crown to discredit a visionary who had attracted a following. Alston says that Barton had retracted her statements, but Gasquet says that is based on information under the control of the government.
