= Submission of the Clergy Act 1533 =

Act of the Parliament of England

Submission of the Clergy Act 1533 (Note: The citation of this act by this short title was authorised by section 5 of, and the second schedule to, the Statute Law Revision Act 1948. Due to the repeal of those provisions, it is now authorised by section 19(2) of the Interpretation Act 1978.)
- Act of Parliament
- Parliament of England
- Long title: An Acte for the Submission of the Clergie to the Kynges Majestie. (Note: These words are printed against this act in the second column of the second schedule to the Statute Law Revision Act 1948, which is headed "Title".)
- Citation: 25 Hen. 8 c. 19
- Territorial extent: England and Wales

Dates
- Royal assent: 30 March 1534
- Commencement: 15 January 1534 (Note: Start of session.)
Other legislation
| Amended by | Statute Law Revision Act 1888; Statute Law Revision Act 1948; Ecclesiastical Jurisdiction Measure 1963; Criminal Law Act 1967; Statute Law (Repeals) Act 1969; Church of England (Worship and Doctrine) Measure 1974 |

Status: Amended

Text of statute as originally enacted

Text of the Submission of the Clergy Act 1533 as in force today (including any amendments) within the United Kingdom, from legislation.gov.uk.

The Submission of the Clergy Act 1533 (25 Hen. 8 c. 19) is an act of the Parliament of England. It was one of the laws passed by the Reformation Parliament that subjugated the Church of England to the Crown as part of Henry VIII's break with Rome.

As of 2025, sections 1 and 3 of the act are still in force.

Section 1 of the act requires royal assent for the making of laws, including canon law, by the Convocations of Canterbury and York. Section 3 of the act makes laws passed by the Convocations invalid to the extent they contradict the law of the land or the royal prerogative. Section 1(3) of the Synodical Government Measure 1969 (No. 2), which established the General Synod of the Church of England, applies these sections to the General Synod.

== Subsequent developments ==
In section 4 and 5 of the act, the words of commencement were repealed by section 1 of, and schedule 1 to, the Statute Law Revision Act 1948 (11 & 12 Geo. 6. c. 62), which came into force on 30 July 1948.

In section 4 of the act, the words from "but that all manner of appelles" to the end, and section 6 of the act, were repealed by section 87 of, and the fifth schedule to, the Ecclesiastical Jurisdiction Measure 1963 (No. 1), which came into force on 1 March 1965.

Section 5 of the act was repealed by section 13 of, and part I of schedule 4 to, the Criminal Law Act 1967, which came into force on 21 July 1967

Section 3 of the act (which provides that no Canons shall be contrary to the Royal Prerogative or the customs, laws or statutes of this realm) does not apply to any rule of ecclesiastical law relating to any matter for which provision may be made by Canon in pursuance of the Church of England (Worship and Doctrine) Measure 1974 (No. 3) or section 1 of the Church of England (Miscellaneous Provisions) Measure 1976 (No. 3).

The whole act, so far as unrepealed, except sections 1 and 3, was repealed by section 1 of, and part II of the schedule to, the Statute Law (Repeals) Act 1969, which came into force on 1 January 1970. The repeal by the 1969 of section 2 of the Act of Supremacy (1 Eliz. 1. c. 1) does not affect the continued operation, so far as unrepealed, of the act.
