= List of acts of the Parliament of England from 1540 =

This is a list of acts of the Parliament of England for the year 1540.

For acts passed during the period 1707–1800, see the list of acts of the Parliament of Great Britain. See also the list of acts of the Parliament of Scotland, and the list of acts of the Parliament of Ireland.

For acts passed from 1801 onwards, see the list of acts of the Parliament of the United Kingdom. For acts of the devolved parliaments and assemblies in the United Kingdom, see the list of acts of the Scottish Parliament, the list of acts of the Northern Ireland Assembly, and the list of acts and measures of Senedd Cymru; see also the list of acts of the Parliament of Northern Ireland.

For medieval statutes, etc. that are not considered to be acts of Parliament, see the list of English statutes.

See also the List of ordinances and acts of the Parliament of England, 1642–1660 for ordinances and acts passed by the Long Parliament and other bodies without royal assent, and which were not considered to be valid legislation following the Restoration in 1660.

The number shown after each act's title is its chapter number. Acts are cited using this number, preceded by the years of the reign during which the relevant parliamentary session was held; thus the Union with Ireland Act 1800 is cited as "39 & 40 Geo. 3. c. 67", meaning the 67th act passed during the session that started in the 39th year of the reign of George III and which finished in the 40th year of that reign. The modern convention is to use Arabic numerals in citations (thus "41 Geo. 3" rather than "41 Geo. III"). Acts of the last session of the Parliament of Great Britain and the first session of the Parliament of the United Kingdom are both cited as "41 Geo. 3".

Acts passed by the Parliament of England did not have a short title; however, some of these acts have subsequently been given a short title by acts of the Parliament of the United Kingdom, such as the Short Titles Act 1896 (59 & 60 Vict. c. 14).

Acts passed by the Parliament of England were deemed to have come into effect on the first day of the session in which they were passed. Because of this, the years given in the list below may in fact be the year before a particular act was passed.

== 32 Hen. 8 ==
The third session of the 7th Parliament of King Henry VIII, which met from 12 April 1540 until 24 July 1540.

This session was also traditionally cited as 32 H. 8.

=== Public acts ===
Short title	Citation	Royal assent
Long title
Statute of Wills or the Statute of Wills 1540 or the Wills Act 1540 (repealed)	32 Hen. 8. c. 1	24 July 1540
An Act how Lands may be willed by Testament. (Repealed by Wills Act 1837 (7 Will. 4 & 1 Vict. c. 26))
Limitation of Prescription Act 1540 or the Statute of Limitations 1540 (repealed)	32 Hen. 8. c. 2	24 July 1540
An Act for Limitation of Prescription. (Repealed by Statute Law Revision Act 1887 (50 & 51 Vict. c. 59))
Perpetuation of Laws Act 1540 (repealed)	32 Hen. 8. c. 3	24 July 1540
An Act for the Continuation of certain Acts. (Repealed by Statute Law Revision Act 1863 (26 & 27 Vict. c. 125))
Treasons in Wales Act 1540 (repealed)	32 Hen. 8. c. 4	24 July 1540
An Act for Trial of Treasons in Wales. (Repealed by Statute Law Revision Act 1863 (26 & 27 Vict. c. 125))
Execution Act 1540 (repealed)	32 Hen. 8. c. 5	24 July 1540
An Act for Contentation of Debts upon Execution. (Repealed by Statute Law Revision Act 1948 (11 & 12 Geo. 6. c. 62))
Conveyance of Horses into Scotland Act 1540 (repealed)	32 Hen. 8. c. 6	24 July 1540
An Act for Trial of Felonies upon conveying of Horses into Scotland. (Repealed by Statute Law Revision Act 1863 (26 & 27 Vict. c. 125))
Tithe Act 1540 (repealed)	32 Hen. 8. c. 7	24 July 1540
An Act for the true Payment of Tithes and Offerings. (Repealed by Statute Law Revision Act 1887 (50 & 51 Vict. c. 59), Ecclesiastical Jurisdiction Measure 1963 (No. 1) and Statute Law (Repeals) Act 1969 (c. 52))
Game Act 1540 (repealed)	32 Hen. 8. c. 8	24 July 1540
An Act against Sellers and Buyers of Pheasants and Partridges. (Repealed by Statute Law Revision Act 1863 (26 & 27 Vict. c. 125))
Maintenance and Embracery Act 1540 (repealed)	32 Hen. 8. c. 9	24 July 1540
An Act against Maintenance, Embracery; and against unlawful buying of Titles. (Repealed by Criminal Law Act 1967 (c. 58))
Priests, etc. Act 1540 (repealed)	32 Hen. 8. c. 10	24 July 1540
An Act for the Moderation of the Punishment of Incontinency of Priests and Women offending with them. (Repealed by Statute Law Revision Act 1863 (26 & 27 Vict. c. 125))
Stealing Hawks' Eggs Act 1540 (repealed)	32 Hen. 8. c. 11	24 July 1540
An Act concerning stealing of Hawk's Eggs, Conies and Deer. (Repealed by Statute Law Revision Act 1863 (26 & 27 Vict. c. 125))
Sanctuaries Act 1540 (repealed)	32 Hen. 8. c. 12	24 July 1540
An Act concerning Sanctuaries, Privileges of Churches and Church-yards. (Repealed by Statute Law Revision Act 1863 (26 & 27 Vict. c. 125))
Horses Act 1540 (repealed)	32 Hen. 8. c. 13	24 July 1540
An Act concerning the Breed of Horses of higher Stature. (Repealed by Repeal of Obsolete Statutes Act 1856 (19 & 20 Vict. c. 64))
Navigation Act 1540 (repealed)	32 Hen. 8. c. 14	24 July 1540
An Act for Maintenance of the Navy of England, and for certain Rates of Freights. (Repealed by Repeal of Acts Concerning Importation Act 1822 (3 Geo. 4. c. 41)
Religion Act 1540 (repealed)	32 Hen. 8. c. 15	24 July 1540
An Act concerning Archbishops, Bishops, their Chancellors, Commissary, Archdeacons and their Officials, to be in the Commission of the Act concerning the Abolition of erroneous Opinions in Christian Religion. (Repealed by Statute Law Revision Act 1863 (26 & 27 Vict. c. 125))
Aliens Act 1540 (repealed)	32 Hen. 8. c. 16	24 July 1540
An Act concerning Strangers. (Repealed by Statute Law Revision Act 1863 (26 & 27 Vict. c. 125))
Paving of Holborn, Aldgate, etc. Act 1540 (repealed)	32 Hen. 8. c. 17	24 July 1540
An Act for paving of Aldgate to Whitechapel, High Holborn, Chancery Lane, Grays-Inn Lane, Shoe Lane and Feuther Lane. (Repealed by Statute Law Revision Act 1948 (11 & 12 Geo. 6. c. 62))
Rebuilding of Certain Towns Act 1540 (repealed)	32 Hen. 8. c. 18	24 July 1540
An Act for re-edifying of decayed Houses in sundry Towns, and Places of the Realm. (Repealed by Statute Law Revision Act 1948 (11 & 12 Geo. 6. c. 62))
Rebuilding of West Country Towns Act 1540 (repealed)	32 Hen. 8. c. 19	24 July 1540
An Act for re-edifying of decayed Houses in sundry Towns of the West Parts. (Repealed by Statute Law Revision Act 1948 (11 & 12 Geo. 6. c. 62))
Suppression of Monasteries Act 1540 (repealed)	32 Hen. 8. c. 20	24 July 1540
An Act concerning Privileges and Franchises. (Repealed by Statute Law (Repeals) Act 1969 (c. 52))
Trinity Term Act 1540 (repealed)	32 Hen. 8. c. 21	24 July 1540
An Act for the Abbreviation and Limitation of Trinity Term. (Repealed by Statute Law Revision Act 1873 (36 & 37 Vict. c. 91))
Tenths Act 1540 (repealed)	32 Hen. 8. c. 22	24 July 1540
An Act concerning the Accounts of Bishops and others, for the Tenth granted to the King's Majesty. (Repealed by Statute Law Revision Act 1873 (36 & 37 Vict. c. 91))
Taxation Act 1540 (repealed)	32 Hen. 8. c. 23	24 July 1540
The Subsidy of the Clergy of the Province of Canterbury. (Repealed by Statute Law Revision Act 1873 (36 & 37 Vict. c. 91))
Hospital of Saint John of Jerusalem (Possessions, etc.) Act 1540 (repealed)	32 Hen. 8. c. 24	24 July 1540
An Act concerning the Lands and Goods of the Hospitals of St. John of Jerusalem in England and Ireland, to be hereafter in the King's Hands and Disposition. (Repealed by Statute Law Revision Act 1948 (11 & 12 Geo. 6. c. 62))
Treason Act 1540 (repealed)	32 Hen. 8. c. 25	24 July 1540
An Act declaring the Dissolution of the King's pretensed Marriage with the Lady Anne of Cleves. (Repealed by Statute Law Revision Act 1948 (11 & 12 Geo. 6. c. 62))
Religion (No. 2) Act 1540 (repealed)	32 Hen. 8. c. 26	24 July 1540
An Act concerning true Opinions and Declarations of Christ's Religion. (Repealed by Statute Law Revision Act 1863 (26 & 27 Vict. c. 125))
Certain Recent Grants and Licences Avoide Act 1540 (repealed)	32 Hen. 8. c. 27	24 July 1540
An Act for the Resumption of extraordinary Grants and of Licences of Absence; and Reversions in the Town of Calais, and the Marches of the same, and in Berwick; and of the Sheriffwicks for Life in Wales. (Repealed by Statute Law Revision Act 1948 (11 & 12 Geo. 6. c. 62))
Leases Act 1540 (repealed)	32 Hen. 8. c. 28	24 July 1540
An Act that Lessees shall enjoy their Farms against the Tenants in Tail. (Repealed by Law of Property (Amendment) Act 1924 (15 & 16 Geo. 5. c. 5))
Lands at Oswaldbeck, Nottinghamshire (Descent) Act 1540 (repealed)	32 Hen. 8. c. 29	24 July 1540
An Act concerning customable Lands in Osweldebek Soke. (Repealed by Statute Law Revision Act 1948 (11 & 12 Geo. 6. c. 62))
Mispleadings, Jeofails, etc. Act 1540 (repealed)	32 Hen. 8. c. 30	24 July 1540
An Act concerning Mispleading, Jeofails (Note: The dictionary definition of jeofail at Wiktionary) and Attorneys. (Repealed by Statute Law Revision and Civil Procedure Act 1883 (46 & 47 Vict. c. 49))
Recoveries Act 1540 (repealed)	32 Hen. 8. c. 31	24 July 1540
An Act for the avoiding of Recoveries by Collusion, by Tenants for Term of Life. (Repealed by Recoveries Act 1572 (14 Eliz. 1. c. 8))
Joint Tenants for Life or Years Act 1540 (repealed)	32 Hen. 8. c. 32	24 July 1540
An Act concerning Joint Tenants for Term of Life or Years. (Repealed by Law of Property (Amendment) Act 1924 (15 & 16 Geo. 5. c. 5))
Disseisin Act 1540 (repealed)	32 Hen. 8. c. 33	24 July 1540
An Act that wrongful Disseisin is no Descent in the Law. (Repealed by Statute Law Revision Act 1863 (26 & 27 Vict. c. 125))
Grantees of Reversions Act 1540 (repealed)	32 Hen. 8. c. 34	24 July 1540
An Act concerning Grantees of Reversions to take Advantage of the Conditions to be performed by the Lessees. (Repealed by Law of Property Act 1925 (15 & 16 Geo. 5. c. 20))
Forest Act 1540 (repealed)	32 Hen. 8. c. 35	24 July 1540
An Act that Justices of Forests may make Deputies. (Repealed by Statute Law Revision Act 1948 (11 & 12 Geo. 6. c. 62))
Fines Act 1540 (repealed)	32 Hen. 8. c. 36	24 July 1540
An Act for the Exposition of the Statute of Fines. (Repealed by Statute Law Revision Act 1863 (26 & 27 Vict. c. 125))
Cestui que vie Act 1540 (repealed)	32 Hen. 8. c. 37	24 July 1540
For Recovery of Arrearages of Rents by Executors of Tenant in Fee-simple. (Repealed by Administration of Estates Act 1925 (15 & 16 Geo. 5. c. 23), Statute Law Revision Act 1948 (11 & 12 Geo. 6. c. 62), Statute Law (Repeals) Act 1969 (c. 52))
Marriage Act 1540 (repealed)	32 Hen. 8. c. 38	24 July 1540
An Act concerning Pre-contracts of Marriages, and touching Degrees of Consanguinity. (Repealed for England and Wales by Marriage Act 1949 (12, 13 & 14 Geo. 6. c. 76) and for the Isle of Man by Statute Law Revision (Isle of Man) Act 1991 (c. 61))
King's Household Act 1540 (repealed)	32 Hen. 8. c. 39	24 July 1540
The Jurisdiction of the Great Master of the King's Household. (Repealed by Lord Steward Act 1554 (1 Mar. Sess. 3. c. 4))
Physicians Act 1540 (repealed)	32 Hen. 8. c. 40	24 July 1540
An Act concerning the Privileges of Physicians. (Repealed by Medical Act 1956 (4 & 5 Eliz. 2. c. 76))
Horsebread Act 1540 (repealed)	32 Hen. 8. c. 41	24 July 1540
An Act concerning baking of Horse-bread. (Repealed by Horsebread Act 1623 (21 Jas. 1. c. 21))
Concerning Barbers and Chirurgians Act 1540 (repealed)	32 Hen. 8. c. 42	24 July 1540
An Act concerning Barbers and Surgeons to be of one Company. (Repealed by Statute Law (Repeals) Act 1986 (c 12))
Shire Days in County of Chester Act 1540 (repealed)	32 Hen. 8. c. 43	24 July 1540
An Act concerning Shire-days in the County Palatine of Chester. (Repealed by Statute Law Revision Act 1948 (11 & 12 Geo. 6. c. 62))
Royston Act 1540	32 Hen. 8. c. 44	24 July 1540
An Act that the Town of Roysten is reduced to one new Parish.
Court of First Fruits and Tenths Act 1540 (repealed)	32 Hen. 8. c. 45	24 July 1540
The Erection of the Court of the First-fruits and Tenths. (Repealed by Statute Law Revision Act 1863 (26 & 27 Vict. c. 125))
Court of Wards Act 1540 (repealed)	32 Hen. 8. c. 46	24 July 1540
An Act for the Establishment of the Court of the King's Wards. (Repealed by Tenures Abolition Act 1660 (12 Cha. 2. c. 24))
Payment of Tenths by Bishop of Norwich Act 1540 (repealed)	32 Hen. 8. c. 47	24 July 1540
An Act that the Bishop of Norwich shall be charged with the Collection of the King's Tenth, in his Diocese. (Repealed by Statute Law Revision Act 1948 (11 & 12 Geo. 6. c. 62))
Tenure of Castle of Dover Act 1540 (repealed)	32 Hen. 8. c. 48	24 July 1540
An Act concerning the Castle of Dover, Castle-Wards, and other Munitions thereabout. (Repealed by Statute Law Revision Act 1948 (11 & 12 Geo. 6. c. 62))
Act of General Pardon 1540 (repealed)	32 Hen. 8. c. 49	24 July 1540
An Act concerning the King's most gracious, general and free Pardon. (Repealed by Statute Law Revision Act 1863 (26 & 27 Vict. c. 125))
Taxation (No. 2) Act 1540 (repealed)	32 Hen. 8. c. 50	24 July 1540
An Act for the Grant of two Subsidies, and four Fifteenths and Tenths to the King by the Temporalty. (Repealed by Statute Law Revision Act 1863 (26 & 27 Vict. c. 125))
Queen Consort Act 1540 (repealed)	32 Hen. 8. c. 51 (Note: This is the citation in The Statutes of the Realm.); 32 Hen. 8. c. 12 Pr. (Note: This is the citation in The Statutes at Large.)	24 July 1540
The Kinges aucthoritie to make Joyntures & to geve landes to the Prince, &c. (Repealed by Statute Law Revision Act 1863 (26 & 27 Vict. c. 125) and Statute Law (Repeals) Act 1969 (c. 52))

=== Private acts ===
Short title	Citation	Royal assent
Long title
Cancellation of unpaid debts in Cofferer's custody.	32 Hen. 8. c. 52 Pr. (Note: This is the citation in The Statutes of the Realm.); 32 Hen. 8. c. 1 Pr. (Note: This is the citation in The Statutes at Large.)	24 July 1540
An act that such tayles as remain in the custody of the cofferer unpaid, shall be restored to the treasurer and chamberlains of the exchequer, there to be cancelled and dampned.
Honour of Ewelme Act 1540	32 Hen. 8. c. 53 Pr. 32 Hen. 8. c. 2 Pr.	24 July 1540
An act that the honour of Wallingford shall be separated from the dukedom of Cornwall, and united to the manor of Newelme, which shall be called the honor of Newelme, and have like liberties and privileges as the honour of Wallingford had. (Note: An honour was a landholding as a feudal barony.) (Note: Honour of Wallingford.)
Windsor Castle Act 1540	32 Hen. 8. c. 54 Pr. 32 Hen. 8. c. 3 Pr.	24 July 1540
An act for the uniting of divers lordships and manors to the castle of Windsor.
Honour of Hampton Court Act 1540	32 Hen. 8. c. 55 Pr. 32 Hen. 8. c. 4 Pr.	24 July 1540
An act for the uniting of the manor of Nonsuch, and divers other manors, to the honour of Hampton-Court.
Honour of Petworth Act 1540	32 Hen. 8. c. 56 Pr. 32 Hen. 8. c. 5 Pr.	24 July 1540
An act for the uniting of divers manors to the honour of Petworth.
County Palatine of Duchy of Lancaster: placing the Monastery of Furness within the survey, letting and setting of the Chancellor and officers of the county.	32 Hen. 8. c. 57 Pr. 32 Hen. 8. c. 6 Pr.	24 July 1540
An act that the monastery of Furness, and divers other lands, shall be in the survey, letting, and setting of the chancellor of the county palatine and duchy of Lancaster, and of the officers of the said county.
Attainder of Giles Heron.	32 Hen. 8. c. 58 Pr. 32 Hen. 8. c. 7 Pr.	24 July 1540
An act for the attainder of Giles Heron. (Note: Giles Heron.)
Attainders of Richard Fetherston, Thomas Abell, Edward Powell, William Horne, Laurence Cooke and Margaret Tyrrell for adherence to the Church of Rome.	32 Hen. 8. c. 59 Pr. 32 Hen. 8. c. 8 Pr.	24 July 1540
An act for the attainder of Richard Fetherstone, (Note: Richard Fetherston.) Thomas Abell, (Note: Thomas Abel.) Edward Powell, (Note: Edward Powell.) William Horne, (Note: William Horne.) Margaret Tyrrell, and Laurence Cooke, for adhering to the bishop of Rome.
Attainders of Butolph, Damplipp, Brindholme, Philpot, Gryning, Barnes, Geratt, Jerome and Carewe for adherence to the Church of Rome.	32 Hen. 8. c. 60 Pr. 32 Hen. 8. c. 9 Pr.	24 July 1540
An act for the attainder of Gregory Butolph, (Note: Gregory Botolf.) Adam Damplipp, (Note: Adam Damlip.) and others, (Note: Edmund Brindholme, Clement Philpot, Robert Barnes, Thomas Gerrard and William Jerome.) for adhering to the bishop of Rome.
Attainders of William Byrd, Lord Hungerford and others.	32 Hen. 8. c. 61 Pr. 32 Hen. 8. c. 10 Pr.	24 July 1540
An act for the attainder of William Byrd, (Note: William Bird, Rector of Fittleton.) Walter lord Hungerford, (Note: Walter Hungerford, 1st Baron Hungerford of Heytesbury.) and others.
Attainder of Lord Cromwell.	32 Hen. 8. c. 62 Pr. 32 Hen. 8. c. 11 Pr.	24 July 1540
An act the attainder of Thomas lord Cromwell. (Note: Thomas Cromwell.)
Exchange of lands between King and Prebend of Rugemore.	32 Hen. 8. c. 63 Pr. 32 Hen. 8. c. 14 Pr.	24 July 1540
An act for the inclosing of divers lands belonging to the prebend of Rugemore, for the inlarging of Marybone park (Note: Marylebone Park is now known as Regent's Park.) in the county of Middlesex in lieu of which lands the King giveth the parsonage of Throwley in the county of Kent to the prebend and his successors.
St. Saviour Southwark Act 1540	32 Hen. 8. c. 64 Pr. 32 Hen. 8. c. 15 Pr.	24 July 1540
An act for the uniting of the parishes of St. Margate and St. Mary Magdalene in Southwark, and that it be from thenceforth called the parish of St. Saviour; and that some of the parishioners shall be incorporated by the name of wardens of the parish of St. Saviour.
Resumption of the assignment made of the King's Household.	32 Hen. 8. c. 65 Pr. 32 Hen. 8. c. 18 Pr.	24 July 1540
An act of resumption of the King's household.
Sale between King and Sir Richard Rich.	32 Hen. 8. c. 66 Pr. 32 Hen. 8. c. 19 Pr.	24 July 1540
An act between the King and Sir Richard Rich. Bargain and sale.
Assurance of Rotherfield Greys (Oxfordshire) to Sir Frances Knolles.	32 Hen. 8. c. 67 Pr. 32 Hen. 8. c. 20 Pr.	24 July 1540
An act assuring Rotherfield Grey to Sir Francis Knollis.
Exchange of lands between the King and Elizabeth Hill.	32 Hen. 8. c. 68 Pr. 32 Hen. 8. c. 21 Pr.	24 July 1540
An act concerning Elizabeth Hill.
Hare's Estate Act 1540	32 Hen. 8. c. 69 Pr. 32 Hen. 8. c. 16 Pr.	24 July 1540
An act to enable Awdrey Hare to sell divers lands.
Richard Long, concerning Shingay.	32 Hen. 8. c. 70 Pr. 32 Hen. 8. c. 22 Pr.	24 July 1540
An act for Richard Long, concerning Shingay.
Sir Edward and Dame Isabel Baynton.	32 Hen. 8. c. 71 Pr. 32 Hen. 8. c. 23 Pr.	24 July 1540
An act for Sir Edward Bainton, knight, and dame Isabell his wife.
Assurance of lands to Harper.	32 Hen. 8. c. 72 Pr. 32 Hen. 8. c. 13 Pr.	24 July 1540
An act for the assurance of the manor of Herons Place in the county of Kent, to George Harpur and Luce his wife.
Exchange between the King and Duke of Norfolk.	32 Hen. 8. c. 73 Pr. 32 Hen. 8. c. 24 Pr.	24 July 1540
An act between the King and the duke of Norfolk, concerning Henkcott and Hardwicke.
Exchange between the King and Lord La Warr.	32 Hen. 8. c. 74 Pr. 32 Hen. 8. c. 25 Pr.	24 July 1540
An act concerning the lord La Warr.
Concerning Mr. Wyatt.	32 Hen. 8. c. 75 Pr. 32 Hen. 8. c. 26 Pr.	24 July 1540
An act concerning Mr. Wyatt.
Exchange between Lord Audley, Sir Thomas Poynings and others.	32 Hen. 8. c. 76 Pr. 32 Hen. 8. c. 27 Pr.	24 July 1540
An act for the lady Awdley, Sir Thomas Poynings, and others. Exchange.
Exchange between the King and Mr Wyat.	32 Hen. 8. c. 77 Pr. 32 Hen. 8. c. 28 Pr.	24 July 1540
An act between the King and Sir Thomas Wyat.
Assurance of lands to the Earl of Hertford.	32 Hen. 8. c. 78 Pr. 32 Hen. 8. c. 29 Pr.	24 July 1540
An act for the assuring of certain lands to the earl of Hertford.
Marquis of Dorset and Lord John Gray.	32 Hen. 8. c. 79 Pr. 32 Hen. 8. c. 30 Pr.	24 July 1540
An act touching the marquiss of Dorsett and the lord John Grey.
Exchange of lands between the King and the Duke of Norfolk.	32 Hen. 8. c. 80 Pr. 32 Hen. 8. c. 17 Pr.	24 July 1540
An act for confirmation of an exchange, made between the King and the duke of Norfolk, of the manor of Shortesfield and other lands in the county of Sussex, the priory of Clarkenwell (Note: Clerkenwell Priory.) and other lands in the county of Middlesex.

=== Sources ===
- "32° Hen. VIII". The Statutes of the Realm. Vol. 3: 1509 to 1547. pp. 744–825 – via HathiTrust.
- "Anno tricesimo secundo Henrici VIII". The Statutes at Large. Vol. 5 – 32 Henry VIII to 7 Edward VI – 1540 to 1552-3. pp. 1–64 – via Internet Archive.
- Journal of the House of Lords. Vol. 1: 1509-1577. London: His Majesty's Stationery Office. 1830 – via British History Online.
- Chronological Table of and Index to the Statutes. Vol. 1: To the End of the Session 59 Vict. Sess. 2 (1895) (13th ed.). London: Her Majesty's Stationery Office. 1896. pp. 50–51 – via Google Books.
- Chronological Table of the Statutes: Covering the Period from 1235 to the End of 1971. London: Her Majesty's Stationery Office. 1972. pp. 47–48. ISBN 978-0-11-840096-1 – via Google Books.
- "Chronological Tables of the Private and Personal Acts: Part 1 (1539–1601)". legislation.gov.uk. The National Archives.

== See also ==
- List of acts of the Parliament of England
- 1540s in England
