= Elizabeth Barton =

16th-century English Catholic nun and martyr

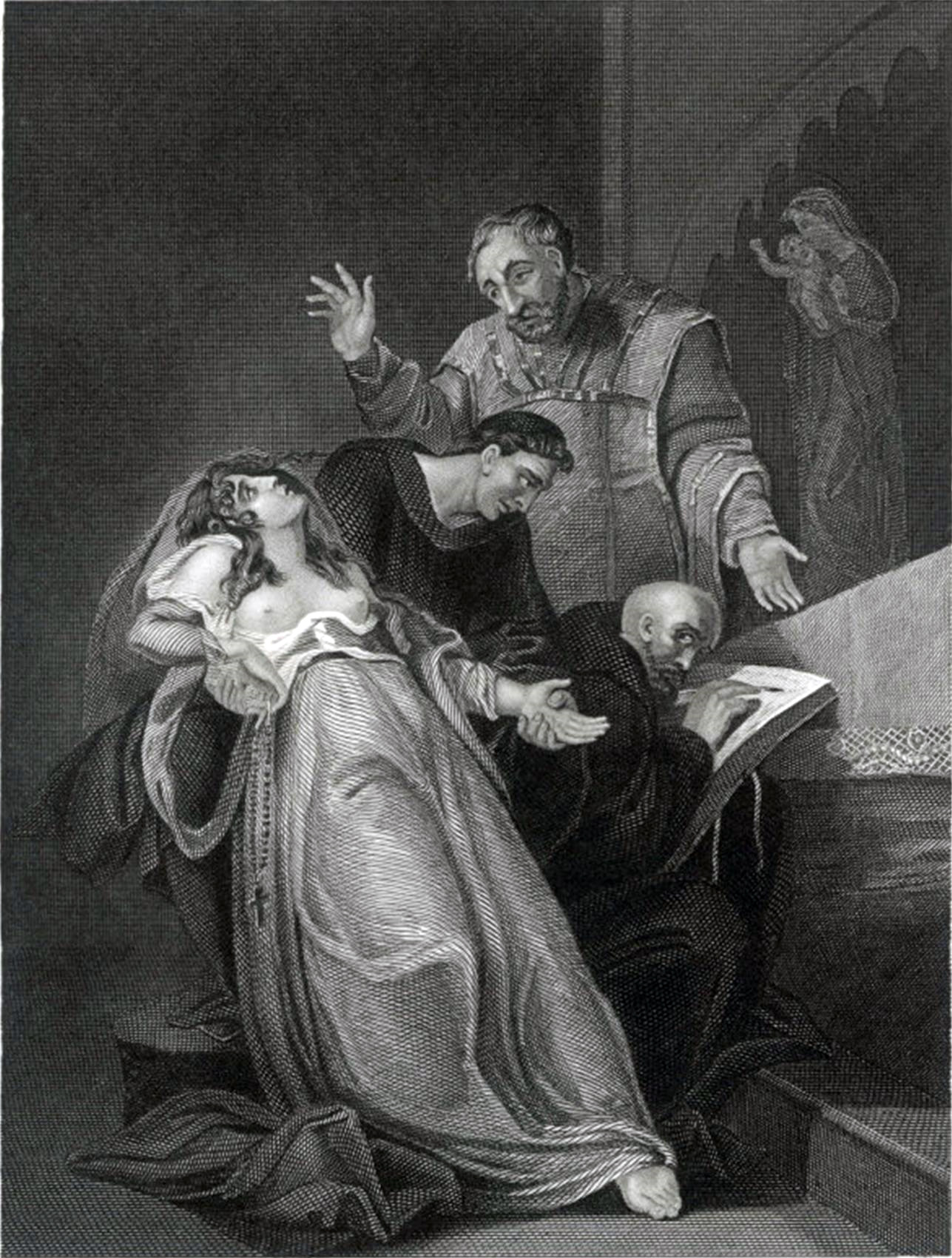
A posthumous engraving of Elizabeth Barton is probably by Thomas Holloway based on a painting by Henry Tresham, and comes from David Hume's The History of England (1793–1806). It represents Barton through the lens of the Protestant propaganda levied against her in later life and after her death, rather than offering a realistic depiction.

Elizabeth Barton (1506 – 20 April 1534), known as "The Nun of Kent", "The Holy Maid of London", "The Holy Maid of Kent" and later "The Mad Maid of Kent", was an English Catholic nun. She was executed as a result of her prophecies against the marriage of King Henry VIII of England to Anne Boleyn.

== Early life ==
Little is known about Barton's early life. She was born in 1506 in the parish of Aldington, about 12 miles from Canterbury, and appears to have come from a poor background. She was working as a servant in 1525 when she said her visions began. This followed her suffering for some months from "an impostume in her stomach, which divers times redounded upwards to her throat and was like to stop her breath", during which time she could not eat or drink, as well as seizures and periods of paralysis.

== Visions ==
On Easter of 1525, at the age of 19, while working as a domestic servant in the household of Thomas Cobb, a farmer of Aldington, who worked for Archbishop William Warham, Barton claimed to have had very vivid visions and to have received divine revelations that predicted events. This included the death of a child living in her household or, more frequently, pleas for people to remain in the Catholic Church. Her revelations followed a similar pattern of Catholic orthodoxy seen in previous 'holy maids' in the later medieval period. She urged people to pray to the Virgin Mary and to undertake pilgrimages. Thousands believed in her prophecies and both Archbishop William Warham and Bishop John Fisher attested to her pious life.

When some events that Barton foretold apparently occurred, her reputation spread. Barton's revelations became publicly known and matters were brought up by Archbishop William Warham. The parish priest, Richard Masters, duly referred the matter to Warham, who appointed a commission to ensure that none of her prophecies was at variance with Catholic teaching. This commission was led by the Benedictine monk, Edward Bocking, Barton's spiritual advisor. When the commission decided favourably, Warham arranged for Barton to be received in the Benedictine St Sepulchre's Priory, Canterbury, under Bocking's spiritual direction.

Barton's life became very public. Nothing unorthodox was found in her case; her alleged public healing from the Virgin Mary at Court-at-Street (a hamlet near Lympne, Kent) increased attention and brought fame to her and to the Marian Shrine.

In 1527, Robert Redman published A marueilous woorke of late done at Court of Streete in Kent which discussed all of Barton's "miracles, revelations, and prophecies" and the controversies leading up to the arrests and executions.

In 1528, Barton held a private meeting with Cardinal Thomas Wolsey, the second most powerful man in England after Henry VIII, and she soon thereafter met twice with Henry himself. Henry accepted Barton because her prophecies supported the existing order. She also consulted with Richard Reynolds, a Bridgettine monk of Syon Abbey. He arranged a meeting between Barton and Thomas More, who was impressed by her fervour. Her prophecies warned against heresy and condemned rebellion at a time when Henry was attempting to stamp out Lutheranism and was afraid of possible uprising or even assassination by his enemies.

== Conflict with Henry VIII ==
By 1534, Barton's prophecies were less in tune with the interests of Henry VIII, becoming more about political affairs of both state and religion. When the King began the process of obtaining an annulment of his marriage to Catherine of Aragon and seizing control of the Church in England from Rome, Barton opposed him. Barton strongly opposed the English Reformation and, in around 1532, began prophesying that if Henry remarried, he would die within a few months. She said that she had even seen the place in Hell to which he would go. Thomas More thought many prophesies were fictitiously attributed to her, and King Henry actually lived for a further 15 years. Remarkably, probably because of her popularity, Barton went unpunished for nearly a year. More, Reynolds & Fisher all warned her against ‘political’ statements and distanced themselves from her. The King's agents spread false rumours about mental illness and sexual relationships with priests.

With her reputation undermined, Barton was arrested by the Crown in 1533 and forced to confess that she had fabricated her revelations. What is known regarding her confession comes from Thomas Cromwell, his agents and other sources affiliated with the Crown. In Thomas Cromwell: A Life, Diarmaid MacCulloch describes the process in some detail, and it seems clear that Barton's arrest was used as part of a larger scheme to bring pressure on those who opposed the King's divorce & re-marriage. Cromwell very efficiently, and for the first time in England, arrested a printer who had produced a pamphlet supporting Barton and collected 700 copies of the print, none of which survive.

In mid-November 1533 an Extraordinary Great Council of Notables was held at Westminster over three days to discuss the ongoing dispute with the Pope and Elizabeth Barton. Barton, who had confessed, was put on show during the proceedings. The Lord Chancellor, Thomas Audley, in his speech on Barton, named and implicated many prominent people "in her seditious conversations". MacCulloch points out he only named those were already dead, whilst making it clear that other names were known. This implied threat was used to great effect by Cromwell in his efforts to bring about the legislation on the King's divorce, the split with Rome and the attack on the monasteries.

Treason of Elizabeth Barton (Pretended Revelations) Act 1533
- Act of Parliament
- Parliament of England
- Long title: An Act concerning the Attainder of Elizabeth Barton and others
- Citation: 25 Hen. 8. c. 12
- Territorial extent: England and Wales

Dates
- Royal assent: 30 March 1534
- Commencement: 15 January 1534 (Note: Start of session.)
- Repealed: 30 July 1948
Other legislation
Repealed by	Statute Law Revision Act 1948

Status: Repealed

Text of statute as originally enacted

Friar John Laurence of the Observant Friars of Greenwich gave evidence against Barton and against fellow Observants, Friars Hugh Rich and Richard Risby. Laurence then requested to be named to one of the posts left vacant by their imprisonment. She was condemned by a bill of attainder, the Treason of Elizabeth Barton (Pretended Revelations) Act 1533 (25 Hen. 8. c. 12), an act of the Parliament of England authorising punishment without trial. This was the first, but by no means the last, use of attainder by Henry and his government.

Barton was attainted for treason by act of Parliament, on the basis that she had maliciously opposed Henry VIII's divorce from Catherine of Aragon, and had prophesied that the king would lose his kingdom. Barton had also asserted that God had revealed to her that he no longer recognised Henry VIII's monarchy. The act of attainder argued that Barton was at the centre of a conspiracy against the King. Barton was viewed as a false prophet who was encouraged to profess fake revelations to persuade others to go against the monarchy.

MacCulloch shows that when it came to frame charges against her there was a difficulty. Treason required hard evidence, preferably in writing, and that was lacking. A new offence, misprision of treason, had recently been introduced which was wider in scope than the Treason Act but had lesser penalties. Not only would that have been retrospective but it would have been possible to argue that a very much wider range of people should be charged as well as they had listened and talked to Barton over some time. Attainder was much simpler. Treason, for a woman, also meant a sentence of being burnt at the stake, however the Barton attainder only specified that the named prisoners should be "put to death". There is some evidence that Cromwell, in this case as in others, preferred a quicker death for the prisoners.

On 20 April 1534 Elizabeth Barton was hanged at Tyburn for treason. She was 28 years old. Five of her chief supporters were executed alongside her:

- Edward Bocking, Benedictine monk of Christ Church, Canterbury
- John Dering, Benedictine monk
- Henry Gold, priest
- Hugh Rich, Franciscan friar
- Richard Risby, Franciscan friar

Barton was buried at Greyfriars Church in Newgate, but her head was put on a spike on London Bridge. She is the only woman in English history to have this final indignity imposed upon her.

== Legacy ==
Churches such as the Anglican Catholic Church of St Augustine of Canterbury continue to venerate Barton.

== Popular culture ==
Barton's case is dealt with in the 2009 historical novel Wolf Hall by Hilary Mantel, and in its television adaptation, where she is played by Aimee-Ffion Edwards. Barton and her prophecies are also mentioned in Philippa Gregory’s 2014 novel The King's Curse; the sixth and final book in The Cousins' War series.

Barton is personally interrogated by Thomas Cromwell, Thomas Cranmer and Nicòla Frescobaldi in Shaking the Throne by author Caroline Angus.

In the play A Man for All Seasons by Robert Bolt, Barton is referenced during the interrogation of Thomas More as having been executed (she was executed about 15 months before More).

Barton is mentioned as the "Holy Maid" in the 1905 novel The King's Achievement by Robert Hugh Benson.

Barton is the subject of The Lost Book of Elizabeth Barton, a novel about a modern-day historian recovering a copy of Barton's prophecies and subsequently becoming entangled in a murder investigation in an English manor near St Sepulchre's Priory.

== See also ==
- Helen of Tottenham

== Bibliography ==
- McKee, John (1925), Dame Elizabeth Barton OSB, the Holy Maid of Kent, London: Burns, Oates and Washbourne.
- Neame, Alan (1971), The Holy Maid of Kent: The Life of Elizabeth Barton: 1506–1534, London: Hodder and Stoughton, ISBN 978-0-340-02574-1.
- Shagan, Ethan H (2003), "Chapter 2: The Anatomy of opposition in early Reformation England; the case of Elizabeth Barton, the holy maid of Kent", Popular Politics in the English Reformation, Cambridge, UK: Cambridge University Press, pp. 61–88.
- Warren, Nancy Bradley (2005), Women of God and Arms., Philadelphia: University of Pennsylvania Press.
- Watt, Diane (1997), Secretaries of God, Cambridge, UK: DS Brewer.
- MacCulloch, Diarmaid (2018), Thomas Cromwell - a Life, London, UK: Allen Lane
