= Avowry =

In law, avowry is where one takes a distress for rent or other thing, and the other sues replevin. In which case the taker shall justify, in his plea, for what cause he took it, and if he took it in his own right, is to show it, and so avow the taking—which is called his avowry. If he took it in the right of another, when he has shown the cause, he is to make conusance of the taking, as being a bailiff or servant to him in whose right he did it.
