= List of acts of the Parliament of England from 1533 =

This is a list of acts of the Parliament of England for the year 1533.

For acts passed during the period 1707–1800, see the list of acts of the Parliament of Great Britain. See also the list of acts of the Parliament of Scotland, and the list of acts of the Parliament of Ireland.

For acts passed from 1801 onwards, see the list of acts of the Parliament of the United Kingdom. For acts of the devolved parliaments and assemblies in the United Kingdom, see the list of acts of the Scottish Parliament, the list of acts of the Northern Ireland Assembly, and the list of acts and measures of Senedd Cymru; see also the list of acts of the Parliament of Northern Ireland.

For medieval statutes, etc. that are not considered to be acts of Parliament, see the list of English statutes.

See also the List of ordinances and acts of the Parliament of England, 1642–1660 for ordinances and acts passed by the Long Parliament and other bodies without royal assent, and which were not considered to be valid legislation following the Restoration in 1660.

The number shown after each act's title is its chapter number. Acts are cited using this number, preceded by the years of the reign during which the relevant parliamentary session was held; thus the Union with Ireland Act 1800 is cited as "39 & 40 Geo. 3. c. 67", meaning the 67th act passed during the session that started in the 39th year of the reign of George III and which finished in the 40th year of that reign. The modern convention is to use Arabic numerals in citations (thus "41 Geo. 3" rather than "41 Geo. III"). Acts of the last session of the Parliament of Great Britain and the first session of the Parliament of the United Kingdom are both cited as "41 Geo. 3".

Acts passed by the Parliament of England did not have a short title; however, some of these acts have subsequently been given a short title by acts of the Parliament of the United Kingdom, such as the Short Titles Act 1896 (59 & 60 Vict. c. 14).

Acts passed by the Parliament of England were deemed to have come into effect on the first day of the session in which they were passed. Because of this, the years given in the list below may in fact be the year before a particular act was passed.

== 25 Hen. 8 ==
The fifth session of the 5th Parliament of King Henry VIII (the Reformation Parliament), which met at Westminster from 15 January 1534 until 30 March 1534.

This session was also traditionally cited as 25 H. 8.

Note that cc. 23–34 were traditionally cited as private acts cc. 1–5, 7, 6, 8, 12, and 9–11 respectively.

Short title	Citation	Royal assent
Long title
Graziers and Butchers Act 1533 (repealed)	25 Hen. 8. c. 1	30 March 1534
An Act concerning Graziers and Butchers. (Repealed by Butchers Act 1541 (33 Hen. 8. c. 11))
Price of Victuals Act 1533 (repealed)	25 Hen. 8. c. 2	30 March 1534
An Act of Proclamation to be made concerning Victuals. (Repealed by Forestalling, Regrating, etc. Act 1844 (7 & 8 Vict. c. 24))
Standing Mute, etc. Act 1533 (repealed)	25 Hen. 8. c. 3	30 March 1534
An Act for standing mute, and peremptory Challenge. (Repealed by Criminal Law Act 1826 (7 Geo. 4. c. 64))
Fish Act 1533 (repealed)	25 Hen. 8. c. 4	30 March 1534
An Act against Forestalling and Regrating of Fish. (Repealed by Fish Act 1543 (35 Hen. 8. c. 7))
Worsteds Act 1533 (repealed)	25 Hen. 8. c. 5	30 March 1534
An Act for Calendering of Worsteds. (Repealed by Repeal of Obsolete Statutes Act 1856 (19 & 20 Vict. c. 64))
Buggery Act 1533 (repealed)	25 Hen. 8. c. 6	30 March 1534
An Act for the Punishment of the Vice of Buggery. (Repealed for England and Wales by Offences Against the Person Act 1828 (9 Geo. 4. c. 31) and for India by Criminal Law (India) Act 1828 (9 Geo. 4. c. 74))
Fish (No. 2) Act 1533 (repealed)	25 Hen. 8. c. 7	30 March 1534
An Act against killing of young Spawn or Fry of Eels and Salmon. (Repealed by Statute Law Revision Act 1863 (26 & 27 Vict. c. 125))
Holborn Street Paving Act 1533 (repealed)	25 Hen. 8. c. 8	30 March 1534
An Act for paving of Holborn. (Repealed by Statute Law Revision Act 1948 (11 & 12 Geo. 6. c. 62))
Pewterers Act 1533 (repealed)	25 Hen. 8. c. 9	30 March 1534
An Act concerning Pewterers. (Repealed by Repeal of Obsolete Statutes Act 1856 (19 & 20 Vict. c. 64))
Oath of Commissioners of Sewers Act 1533 (repealed)	25 Hen. 8. c. 10	30 March 1534
An Act concerning the Acceptance of the Oath to the Act of Sewers. (Repealed by Land Drainage Act 1930 (20 & 21 Geo. 5. c. 44))
Wild-fowl Act 1533 (repealed)	25 Hen. 8. c. 11	30 March 1534
An Act against Destruction of Wild-Fowl. (Repealed by Game Act 1831 (1 & 2 Will. 4. c. 32))
Treason of Elizabeth Barton (Pretended Revelations) Act 1533 (repealed)	25 Hen. 8. c. 12	30 March 1534
An Act concerning the Attainder of Elizabeth Barton (Note: Elizabeth Barton) and others. (Repealed by Statute Law Revision Act 1948 (11 & 12 Geo. 6. c. 62))
Tillage Act 1533 or the Inclosure Act 1533 (repealed)	25 Hen. 8. c. 13	30 March 1534
An Act concerning Farms and Sheep. (Repealed by Repeal of Obsolete Statutes Act 1856 (19 & 20 Vict. c. 64))
Heresy Act 1533 (repealed)	25 Hen. 8. c. 14	30 March 1534
An Act for Punishment of Heresy. (Repealed by Treason Act 1547 (1 Edw. 6. c. 12))
Printers and Binders Act 1533 (repealed)	25 Hen. 8. c. 15	30 March 1534
An Act for Printers and Binders of Books. (Repealed by Statute Law Revision Act 1863 (26 & 27 Vict. c. 125))
Clergy Act 1533 (repealed)	25 Hen. 8. c. 16	30 March 1534
An Act that every Judge of the High Courts may have One Chaplain beneficed with Cure. (Repealed by Statute Law Revision Act 1863 (26 & 27 Vict. c. 125))
Cross-bows Act 1533 (repealed)	25 Hen. 8. c. 17	30 March 1534
An Act for shooting in Cross Bows and Hand Guns. (Repealed by Cross-bows Act 1541 (33 Hen. 8 c. 6))
Cloths Act 1533 (repealed)	25 Hen. 8. c. 18	30 March 1534
An Act for Clothiers within the Shire of Worcester. (Repealed by Repeal of Obsolete Statutes Act 1856 (19 & 20 Vict. c. 64))
Submission of the Clergy Act 1533	25 Hen. 8. c. 19	30 March 1534
An Act for the Submission of the Clergy to the King's Majesty.
Appointment of Bishops Act 1533	25 Hen. 8. c. 20	30 March 1534
An Act restraining the Payment of Annates.
Ecclesiastical Licences Act 1533 or the Peter's Pence Act 1533 or the Dispensations Act 1533	25 Hen. 8. c. 21	30 March 1534
An Act concerning the Exoneration of the King's Subjects from Exactions and Impositions heretofore paid to the See of Rome; and for having Licences and Dispensations within this Realm, without suing further for the same.
Succession to the Crown Act 1533 or the Act of Succession 1533 or the First Succession Act (repealed)	25 Hen. 8. c. 22	30 March 1534
An Act declaring the Establishment of Succession of the King's most Royal Majesty in the Imperial Crown of this Realm. (Repealed by Succession to the Crown Act 1536 (28 Hen. 8. c. 7))
Discharge of Payment by Plymouth to Plympton Monastery Act 1533 (repealed)	25 Hen. 8. c. 23 (Note: This is the citation in The Statutes of the Realm.); 25 Hen. 8. c. 1 Pr. (Note: This is the citation in The Statutes at Large.)	30 March 1534
An Act concerning the Town of Plymouth, containing a Discharge of Payment of 29l. 6s. 8d. to the Prior of the Monastery of St. Peter and Paul in Plympton, and that the Parsonages of Ugburgh and Blackaveton shall be appropriated to the said Prior and his Successors in lieu thereof. (Repealed by Statute Law (Repeals) Act 1978 (c. 45))
Exchange of Lands, Duke of Norfolk and Earl of Oxford Act 1533 (repealed)	25 Hen. 8. c. 24; 25 Hen. 8. c. 2 Pr.	30 March 1534
An Act for Confirmation of an Exchange of certain lands between the Duke of Norfolk and the Heirs General of the Earl of Oxford. (Repealed by Statute Law (Repeals) Act 1978 (c. 45))
Queen's Jointure Act 1533 (repealed)	25 Hen. 8. c. 25; 25 Hen. 8. c. 3 Pr.	30 March 1534
An Acte concernyng the Quenes Joynture. (Repealed by Statute Law (Repeals) Act 1977 (c. 18))
Exchange of Lands, King and Abbot of Waltham Act 1533 (repealed)	25 Hen. 8. c. 26; 25 Hen. 8. c. 4 Pr.	30 March 1534
An Act concerning an Exchange between the King and the Abbot of Waltham. (Repealed by Statute Law (Repeals) Act 1978 (c. 45))
Deprivation of Bishops of Sarum and Worcester Act 1533 (repealed)	25 Hen. 8. c. 27; 25 Hen. 8. c. 5 Pr.	30 March 1534
An Act concerning the Deprivation of the Bishops of Sarem and Worcester, for their living beyond the Seas. (Repealed by Statute Law Revision Act 1948 (11 & 12 Geo. 6. c. 62))
Queen Katherine Act 1533 (repealed)	25 Hen. 8. c. 28; 25 Hen. 8. c. 7 Pr.	30 March 1534
An Acte for the lady Dowager. (Repealed by Statute Law (Repeals) Act 1977 (c. 18))
Bishop of Norwich (Pardon and Restoration) Act 1533 (repealed)	25 Hen. 8. c. 29; 25 Hen. 8. c. 6 Pr.	30 March 1534
An Act concerning the Bishop of Norwich his Pardon, for suing in the Court of Rome for Things concerning the King. (Repealed by Statute Law Revision Act 1948 (11 & 12 Geo. 6. c. 62))
Exchange between King, Duke of Richmond and Lord Lumley Act 1533 (repealed)	25 Hen. 8. c. 30; 25 Hen. 8. c. 8 Pr.	30 March 1534
An Act for Confirmation of an Exchange made between the King and the Duke of Richmond on the one Part, and John Lord Lumley on the other Part. (Repealed by Statute Law (Repeals) Act 1978 (c. 45))
Assurance of Manor of Pyssowe Act 1533 (repealed)	25 Hen. 8. c. 31; 25 Hen. 8. c. 12 Pr.	30 March 1534
An Act for the Assurance of the Manor of Pyshoo, Pyshoo Park, and other Lands in the County of Hertford, to the King, and his Heirs. (Repealed by Statute Law (Repeals) Act 1978 (c. 45))
Pardon of Richard Southwell and others Act 1533 (repealed)	25 Hen. 8. c. 32; 25 Hen. 8. c. 9 Pr.	30 March 1534
An Acte concernyng the pardon of Richard Southwell and others. (Repealed by Statute Law (Repeals) Act 1977 (c. 18))
Assurance of Christchurch, London to the King Act 1533 (repealed)	25 Hen. 8. c. 33; 25 Hen. 8. c. 10 Pr.	30 March 1534
An Act concerning the Assurance of Christ Church in London to the King and his Heirs. (Repealed by Statute Law (Repeals) Act 1978 (c. 45))
Attainder of John Wolff and others Act 1533 (repealed)	25 Hen. 8. c. 34; 25 Hen. 8. c. 11 Pr.	30 March 1534
An Acte concernyng the attaynder of John Wolff his wyffe and others. (Repealed for England by Statute Law (Repeals) Act 1977 (c. 18) and for the Isle of Man by Statute Law (Repeals) Act 1998 (c. 43))

=== Sources ===
- "25° Hen. VIII". The Statutes of the Realm. Vol. 3: 1509 to 1547. pp. 436–491 – via HathiTrust.
- "25° Hen. VIII". The Statutes of the Realm. Vol. 3: 1509 to 1547. pp. 436–491 – via Google Books.
- "Anno vicesimo quinto Henrici VIII". The Statutes at Large. Vol. 4 – 1 Richard III to 31 Henry VIII – 1483-4 to 1539. pp. 262–312 – via Internet Archive.
- "Anno vicesimo quinto Henrici VIII". The Statutes at Large. Vol. 4 – 1 Richard III to 31 Henry VIII – 1483-4 to 1539. pp. 262–312 – via Internet Archive.
- "Anno vicesimo quinto Henrici VIII". The Statutes at Large. Vol. 4 – 1 Richard III to 31 Henry VIII – 1483-4 to 1539. pp. 262–312 – via Internet Archive.
- Journal of the House of Lords. Vol. 1: 1509-1577. London: His Majesty's Stationery Office. 1830 – via British History Online.
- Chronological Table of and Index to the Statutes. Vol. 1: To the End of the Session 59 Vict. Sess. 2 (1895) (13th ed.). London: Her Majesty's Stationery Office. 1896. pp. 47–48 – via Google Books.
- Chronological Table of the Statutes: Covering the Period from 1235 to the End of 1971. London: Her Majesty's Stationery Office. 1972. pp. 43–44. ISBN 978-0-11-840096-1 – via Google Books.
- "Acts of the English Parliament from 1533". legislation.gov.uk. The National Archives.

== See also ==
- List of acts of the Parliament of England
