= Oaths Act =

Generic title for legislation

Oaths Act is a stock short title used in Canada, Malaysia and the United Kingdom for legislation relating to oaths and affirmation.

Oaths Acts is a term of art.

== List ==
=== Canada ===
- The Oaths Act, 1873 disallowed by the government of the United Kingdom.
- An Act respecting the administration of oaths of office – a pro forma act introduced at the beginning of each session of the House of Commons

=== Malaysia ===
- The Oaths and Affirmations Act 1949

=== United Kingdom ===
- The Oaths of Minors Act 1681 (c. 85 (S))
- The Oaths Act 1775 (15 Geo. 3. c. 39)
- The Oaths Act 1838 (1 & 2 Vict. c. 105)
- The Oaths Act 1858 (21 & 22 Vict. c. 48)
- The Oaths Act 1888 (51 & 52 Vict. c. 46)
- The Oaths Act 1909 (9 Edw. 7. c. 39)
- The Oaths Act 1961 (9 & 10 Eliz. 2. c. 21)
- The Oaths And Evidence (Overseas Authorities And Countries) Act 1963 (c. 27)
- Section 8 of the Administration of Justice Act 1977 (c. 38)
- The Oaths Act 1978 (c. 19)

The Oaths Acts

The Oaths Acts 1888 to 1977 meant the Oaths Acts 1888 to 1961 and section 8 of the Administration of Justice Act 1977.

- The Coronation Oath Act 1567 (c. 8 (S))
- The Coronation Oath Act 1688 (1 Will. & Mar. c. 6)
- The Promissory Oaths Act 1868 (31 & 32 Vict. c. 72)
- The Promissory Oaths Act 1871 (34 & 35 Vict. c. 48)
- The Parliamentary Oaths Act 1866 (29 & 30 Vict. c. 19)
- The Parliamentary Witnesses Oaths Act 1871 (34 & 35 Vict. c. 83)
- The Commissioners for Oaths Act 1891 (54 & 55 Vict. c. 50)
- The Commissioners for Oaths Act 1889 (52 & 53 Vict. c. 10)
- The False Oaths (Scotland) Act 1933 (23 & 24 Geo. 5. c. 20)

== See also ==
- List of short titles
- Profane Oaths Act 1745
- Unlawful Oaths Act 1797
- Oaths Act, 1873
- Pledge of Loyalty Act 2006
