= Jews Relief Act 1858 =

Act of the Parliament of the United Kingdom

Jews Relief Act 1858 (Note: The citation of this act by this short title was authorised by section 1 of, and the first schedule to, the Short Titles Act 1896. Due to the repeal of those provisions it is now authorised by section 19(2) of the Interpretation Act 1978.)
- Act of Parliament
- Parliament of the United Kingdom
- Long title: An Act to provide for the Relief of Her Majesty’s Subjects professing the Jewish Religion.
- Citation: 21 & 22 Vict. c. 49
- Territorial extent: United Kingdom

Dates
- Royal assent: 23 July 1858
- Commencement: 23 July 1858 (Note: The Acts of Parliament (Commencement) Act 1793.)
Other legislation
Amended by	Promissory Oaths Act 1871; Irish Free State (Consequential Provisions) Act 1922; Northern Ireland Constitution Act 1973; Statute Law Revision (Northern Ireland) Act 1980; Patronage (Benefices) Measure 1986

Status: Partially repealed

Text of statute as originally enacted

Revised text of statute as amended

Text of the Jews Relief Act 1858 as in force today (including any amendments) within the United Kingdom, from legislation.gov.uk.

The Jews Relief Act 1858 (21 & 22 Vict. c. 49), also called the Jewish Disabilities Act, is an act of the Parliament of the United Kingdom which removed previous barriers to Jews entering Parliament, a step in Jewish emancipation in the United Kingdom.

Following the Roman Catholic Relief Act 1829 (10 Geo. 4. c. 7) there had been an unsuccessful attempt in 1830 to also allow Jews to sit in Parliament. The 1858 measure was the result of a long process which began with a bill introduced by the Whig leader Lord John Russell following the election of Lionel de Rothschild to the City of London constituency in 1847. Rothschild could not take the seat without taking the Christian oath of office. The bill was supported by the future Conservative Prime Minister Benjamin Disraeli but not by his party.

In 1848, the bill was approved by the House of Commons but was twice rejected by the House of Lords as was a new bill in 1851. In the 1852 general election, Rothschild was again elected but the next year the bill was again defeated in the upper house. Finally, in 1858, the House of Lords agreed to a proposal to allow each house to decide its own oath.

The bill allowed "any Person professing the Jewish Religion, [to] omit the Words 'and I make this Declaration upon the true Faith of a Christian'" in their oaths, but explicitly did not extend to allowing Jews to certain high offices, and also stated that "it shall not be lawful for any Person professing the Jewish Religion, directly or indirectly, to advise Her Majesty ... touching or concerning ... any office or preferment in the Church of England or in the Church of Scotland." The Oaths Act 1858 (21 & 22 Vict. c. 48) was passed simultaneously, effecting similar reforms for the public oaths required other than for Parliament.

== Subsequent developments ==
Amendments in 1871, 1922, 1973, 1980 and 1986 removed all restrictions on Jews holding office except that they may not advise certain government officials on matters related to appointments in the Church of England or the Church of Scotland.

Sections 1–3 of the act were repealed by section 1 of, and part II of schedule one to, the Promissory Oaths Act 1871 (34 & 35 Vict. c. 48), which came into force on 13 July 1871.

In September 2026 Prime Minister Andy Burnham announced plans to allow Catholics and Jews to advise the Sovereign on appointments to the Church of England and Church of Scotland, claiming it is "unacceptable for there to be a legislative bar against people of any faith performing all the functions of my office". He confirmed that responsibility for Church appointments has been delegated to the Lord Chancellor. A bill was introduced and passed through the Commons on 21 October 2026.

== See also ==
- Disabilities (Jewish)
- Emancipation of the Jews in the United Kingdom
- Oaths Act 1888, allowing those of no religious belief to simply "solemnly, sincerely, and truly declare"
- Roman Catholic Relief Act 1829, which contains equivalent provision applicable to Roman Catholics

== Bibliography ==
Hansard vol 151 (1858)

Lords: 14 Jun: Observations; 1 Jul: 2nd Reading; 5 Jul: Committee, Report; 8 Jul: Recommittal; 12 Jul: 3rd Reading; Commons: 16 Jul: 2nd Reading; 19 Jul: Committee, Report; 20 Jul: 3rd Reading; Lords: 21 Jul: Agreement.
