= Oaths of Allegiance, etc., and Relief of Jews Act 1858 =

Act of the Parliament of the United Kingdom

- Act of Parliament
- Parliament of the United Kingdom
- Long title: An Act to substitute One Oath for the Oaths of Allegiance, Supremacy, and Abjuration; and for the Relief of Her Majesty's Subjects professing the Jewish Religion
- Citation: 21 & 22 Vict. c. 48
- Introduced by: Lord John Russell (Lords)
- Territorial extent: United Kingdom

Dates
- Royal assent: 23 July 1858
- Commencement: 23 July 1858 (Note: The Acts of Parliament (Commencement) Act 1793.)
- Repealed: 13 July 1871
Other legislation
Amended by	Affirmations by Quakers, etc. Act 1859; Parliamentary Oaths Act 1866
Repealed by	Promissory Oaths Act 1871
Relates to	Sacramental Test Act 1828; Roman Catholic Relief Act 1829; Municipal Offices Act 1845; Jews Relief Act 1858

Status: Repealed

History of passage through Parliament

Text of statute as originally enacted

The Oaths of Allegiance, etc., and Relief of Jews Act 1858 (21 & 22 Vict. c. 48) (informally called the Oaths Bill; long title "An Act to substitute One Oath for the Oaths of Allegiance, Supremacy, and Abjuration; and for the Relief of Her Majesty's Subjects professing the Jewish Religion") was an act of the Parliament of the United Kingdom which replaced three separate oaths of office with a single oath of allegiance to the British monarch. Besides an oath of allegiance, those holding public office had previously been required to take the Oath of Supremacy (recognising the monarch as Supreme Governor of the Church of England) and the Oath of Abjuration (opposing Jacobitism).

The 1858 act had special provisions for British Jews and Quakers but did not apply to Roman Catholics MPs, for whom the Roman Catholic Relief Act 1829 still applied. The act was passed at the same time as the Jews Relief Act 1858 (21 & 22 Vict. c. 49), which removed other civic disabilities.

== Subsequent developments ==
The Affirmations by Quakers, etc. Act 1859 (22 Vict. c. 10) replaced the wording of the Quaker affirmation. The Parliamentary Oaths Act 1866 (29 & 30 Vict. c. 19) changed the oath for legislators taking seats in the Commons or Lords.

The whole act was repealed by section 1 of, and part I of schedule one to, the Promissory Oaths Act 1871 (34 & 35 Vict. c. 48), which came into force on 13 July 1871.

== Bibliography ==
Primary

- 21 & 22 Vict. c.48 and c.49
- 22 Vict. c.10
- Parliamentary Oaths Act 1866
- Promissory Oaths Act 1871, Schedule 1 Part 1

Secondary

- Everett, Michael; Nash, Danielle (26 February 2016). "The Parliamentary Oath" (PDF). Commons Briefing Papers. UK Parliament.
- Finestein, Israel (1959). "Anglo-Jewish Opinion During the Struggle for Emancipation (1828—1858)". Transactions. 20. Jewish Historical Society of England: 113–143. ISSN 2047-2331. JSTOR 29777970.
