= Disabilities (Jewish) =

Restrictions on European Jews in the Middle Ages

Jewish disabilities were legal restrictions, limitations and obligations placed on European Jews in the Middle Ages. In Europe, the disabilities imposed on Jews included provisions requiring Jews to wear specific and identifying clothing such as the Jewish hat and the yellow badge, paying special taxes, swearing special oaths, living in certain neighbourhoods, and forbidding Jews to enter certain trades. In Sweden, for example, Jews were forbidden to sell new pieces of clothing. Disabilities also included special taxes levied on Jews, exclusion from public life, restraints on the performance of religious ceremonies, and linguistic censorship. Some countries went even further and outright expelled Jews, for example England in 1290 (Jews were readmitted in 1655) and Spain in 1492 (readmitted in 1868).

The disabilities began to be lifted with Jewish emancipation in the late 18th and 19th centuries. In 1791, Revolutionary France was the first country to abolish disabilities altogether, followed by Hungary in 1840 and Prussia in 1848. Hungary enacted the full emancipation on 29 July 1849. Emancipation of the Jews in the United Kingdom was achieved in 1858 after an almost 30-year struggle championed by Isaac Lyon Goldsmid with the ability of Jews to sit in parliament with the passing of the Jews Relief Act 1858. The newly united German Empire abolished Jewish disabilities in Germany in 1871. The first Jewish settlers in North America arrived in the Dutch colony of New Amsterdam in 1654. They were forbidden to hold public office, open a retail shop, or establish a synagogue. When the colony was seized by the British in 1664 Jewish rights remained unchanged, but by 1671 Asser Levy was the first Jew to serve on a jury in North America.

In the Russian Empire Jewish disabilities were completely abolished after the Russian Revolution in 1917.

== See also ==
- Christian privilege
- Dhimmi
- Disabilities (Catholics)
- Jewish question
- Jewish quota
- Pale of settlement
- Ghetto benches
