= Purchasers of Forfeited Estates (Ireland) Act 1702 =

Act of the Parliament of England

- Act of Parliament
- Parliament of England
- Long title: An Act for the relief of the Protestant purchasers of the forfeited estates in Ireland
- Citation: 1 Ann. c. 26 (Note: This is the citation in The Statutes of the Realm.); 1 Ann. St. 1. c. 32 (Note: This is the citation in The Statutes at Large.)
- Territorial extent: Kingdom of Ireland

Dates
- Royal assent: 25 May 1702
- Commencement: 8 March 1702 (Note: Start of session.)
- Repealed: 13 July 1871
Other legislation
| Repealed by | Promissory Oaths Act 1871 |
| Relates to | Crown Lands (Forfeited Estates) Act 1698 |

Status: Repealed

Text of statute as originally enacted

The Purchasers of Forfeited Estates (Ireland) Act 1702 (1 Ann. c. 26) was an act of the Parliament of England. Its long title is "An act for the relief of the Protestant purchasers of the forfeited estates in Ireland". The act was one of a series of Penal Laws against Catholics in Ireland.

== Subsequent developments ==
The whole act was repealed by section 1 of, and part I of schedule one to, the Promissory Oaths Act 1871 (34 & 35 Vict. c. 48), which came into force on 13 July 1871.
