= Oaths Act 1888 =

Act of the Parliament of the United Kingdom

Oaths Act 1888 (Note: Section 7.)
- Act of Parliament
- Parliament of the United Kingdom
- Long title: An Act to amend the Law as to Oaths.
- Citation: 51 & 52 Vict. c. 46
- Territorial extent: United Kingdom

Dates
- Royal assent: 24 December 1888
- Commencement: 24 December 1888 (Note: The Acts of Parliament (Commencement) Act 1793.)
- Repealed: 30 July 1978
Other legislation
Amends	Common Law Procedure Act 1854; Common Law Procedure Amendment Act (Ireland) 1856; Criminal Law Amendment Act 1867; Juries Act (Ireland) 1868; Evidence Further Amendment Act 1869
Repeals/revokes	Affirmations Act 1861; Affirmations (Scotland) Act 1865; Jurors Affirmation (Scotland) Act 1868; Evidence Amendment Act 1870
Amended by	Perjury Act 1911; False Oaths (Scotland) Act 1933; Administration of Justice Act 1977
Repealed by	Oaths Act 1978

Status: Repealed

Text of statute as originally enacted

The Oaths Act 1888 (51 & 52 Vict. c. 46) was an act of the Parliament of the United Kingdom providing that all required oaths (including the oath of allegiance taken to the Sovereign, required in order to sit in Parliament) may be solemnly affirmed rather than sworn to God. The act was the culmination of a campaign by the noted atheist and secularist MP Charles Bradlaugh to take his seat.

== Subsequent developments ==
The whole act by section 7(1) of, and part I of the schedule to, the Oaths Act 1978, which came into force on 30 June 1978.

== See also ==
- Oaths Act
