= Promissory Oaths Act 1871 =

Act of the Parliament of the United Kingdom

Promissory Oaths Act 1871 (Note: Section 3.)
- Act of Parliament
- Parliament of the United Kingdom
- Long title: An Act to repeal divers enactments relating to Oaths and Declarations which are not in force; and for other purposes connected therewith.
- Citation: 34 & 35 Vict. c. 48
- Introduced by: William Wood, 1st Baron Hatherley (Lords)
- Territorial extent: United Kingdom

Dates
- Royal assent: 13 July 1871
- Commencement: 13 July 1871 (Note: The Acts of Parliament (Commencement) Act 1793.)

Other legislation
- Amends: See § Repealed enactments
- Repeals/revokes: See § Repealed enactments
- Amended by: Statute Law Revision Act 1883; Supreme Court of Judicature (Northern Ireland) Order 1921; Sheriff Courts (Scotland) Act 1971; District Courts (Scotland) Act 1975; Courts Act 2003; Constitutional Reform Act 2005; Judiciary and Courts (Scotland) Act 2008 (Consequential Modifications) Order 2009; Courts Reform (Scotland) Act 2014; Justice Act (Northern Ireland) 2015
- Relates to: Solicitors Act 1845; Repeal of Obsolete Statutes Act 1856; Statute Law Revision Act 1871; See Statute Law Revision Acts

Status: Amended

History of passage through Parliament

Records of Parliamentary debate relating to the statute from Hansard

Text of statute as originally enacted

Revised text of statute as amended

Text of the Promissory Oaths Act 1871 as in force today (including any amendments) within the United Kingdom, from legislation.gov.uk.

The Promissory Oaths Act 1871 (34 & 35 Vict. c. 48) is an act of the Parliament of the United Kingdom that repealed for the United Kingdom enactments relating to promissory oaths from 1346 to 1867 which had ceased to be in force or had become unnecessary. The act was intended, in particular, to facilitate the preparation of the revised edition of the statutes, then in progress.

== Background ==
In the United Kingdom, acts of Parliament remain in force until expressly repealed. Blackstone's Commentaries on the Laws of England, published in the late 18th century, raised questions about the system and structure of the common law and the poor drafting and disorder of the existing statute book.

From 1810 to 1825, The Statutes of the Realm was published, providing the first authoritative collection of acts. The first statute law revision act was not passed until 1856 with the Repeal of Obsolete Statutes Act 1856 (19 & 20 Vict. c. 64). This approach — focusing on removing obsolete laws from the statute book followed by consolidation — was proposed by Peter Locke King MP, who had been highly critical of previous commissions' approaches, expenditures, and lack of results.

Previous statute law revision acts
Year passed	Title	Citation	Effect
1861	Statute Law Revision Act 1861	24 & 25 Vict. c. 101	Repealed or amended over 800 enactments
1863	Statute Law Revision Act 1863	26 & 27 Vict. c. 125	Repealed or amended over 1,600 enactments for England and Wales
1867	Statute Law Revision Act 1867	30 & 31 Vict. c. 59	Repealed or amended over 1,380 enactments
1870	Statute Law Revision Act 1870	33 & 34 Vict. c. 69	Repealed or amended over 250 enactments

The Declarations Before Taking Office Act 1866 (29 & 30 Vict. c. 22) and the Promissory Oaths Act 1868 (31 & 32 Vict. c. 72) provided for the form of oath of allegiance to be made, rendering several statutes unnecessary.

== Passage ==
The bill had its first reading in the House of Lords on 30 March 1871, introduced by the Lord Chancellor, William Wood, 1st Baron Hatherley. The bill had its second reading in the House of Lords on 24 April 1871 and was committed to a committee of the whole house, which met on 5 May 1871 and 10 May 1871 and reported on 10 May 1871, without amendments. The bill had its third reading in the House of Lords on 12 May 1871 and passed, without amendments.

The bill had its first reading in the House of Commons on 1 June 1871. The bill had its second reading in the House of Commons on 12 June 1871 and was committed to a committee of the whole house, which met on 26 June 1871 and 27 June 1871, during which a Motion to refer the bill to a select committee was withdrawn during debate. The bill was re-committed to a committee of the whole house on 29 June 1871, which met and reported on 29 June 1871, with amendments. The amended bill had its third reading in the House of Commons on 3 July 1871 and passed, without amendments.

The amended bill was considered and agreed to by the House of Lords on 10 July 1871.

The bill was granted royal assent on 13 July 1871.

== Subsequent developments ==
The act was intended, in particular, to facilitate the preparation of a revised edition of the statutes.

The act was partly in force in Great Britain at the end of 2010.

Section one to end of subsection (1) and the schedules to the act was repealed by section 1 of, and schedule 1 to, the Statute Law Revision Act 1883 (46 & 47 Vict. c. 39), which came into force on 25 August 1883.

== Repealed enactments ==
Section 1 of the act repealed 199 enactments, listed in the first, second, third and fourth schedules to the act.

Section 1 of the act included several safeguards to ensure that the repeal does not negatively affect existing rights or ongoing legal matters. Specifically, any legal rights, privileges, or remedies already obtained under the repealed laws, as well as any legal proceedings or principles established by them, remain unaffected. Section 1 of the act also provided that if someone is exempt from taking an oath or making a declaration that would normally be required for a position or benefit, they can still qualify for it by meeting all other conditions, as if they had taken the oath.

Section 2 of the act specified where officers should take their oaths of allegiance and judicial oaths across Great Britain and Ireland, either before crown-appointed persons or in open court before various senior judges and courts, with specific provisions for England, Scotland, and Ireland's distinct legal systems.

Parliament of England, Parliament of Great Britain and Parliament of the United Kingdom
Citation	Short title	Title	Extent of repeal
20 Edw. 3. c. 1 (Note: 18 Edw. 3. stat. 4. in the ordinary editions.)	Oath of the justices	Oath of the justices.	The whole act.
20 Edw. 3. c. 2 (Note: 18 Edw. 3. stat. 5. in the ordinary editions.)	Chancery Oath Act 1346	Oath of the clerks of the chancery.	The whole act.
13 Cha. 2 St. 2. c. 1	Corporation Act 1661	An Act for the well governing and regulating of corporations.	The whole act.
1 Will. & Mar. c. 8 (Note: Sess. 1 in the ordinary editions)	Oaths of Allegiance and Supremacy Act 1688	An Act for the abrogating of the oathes of supremacy and allegiance, and appointing other oathes.	The whole act.
3 Will. & Mar. c. 2	Oaths of Supremacy, etc., Ireland Act 1691	An Act for the abrogating the oath of supremacy in Ireland, and appointing other oaths.	The whole act.
1 Ann. c. 26 (Note: Stat. 1. c. 32. in the ordinary editions.)	Purchasers of Forfeited Estates (Ireland) Act 1702	An Act for the relief of the Protestant purchasers of the forfeited estates in Ireland.	The whole act.
6 Ann. c. 66 (Note: Chap. 14. in the ordinary editions.)	Security of the Sovereign Act 1707	An Act for the better security of Her Majesty's Person and Government.	The whole act.
8 Ann. c. 15	Security of the Sovereign Act 1707	An Act for explaining and enlarging an Act of the sixth year of Her Majesty's reign, intituled "An for the security of Her Majesty's Person and Government."	The whole act.
10 Ann. c. 6 (Note: Chap. 2. in the ordinary editions.)	Security of the Sovereign Act 1709	An Act for preserving the Protestant religion by better securing the Church of England as by law established, and for confirming the toleration granted to Protestant dissenters by an Act intituled "An Act for exempting their Majesties' Protestant subjects dissenting from the Church of England from the penalties of certain Laws," and for supplying the defects thereof, and for the further securing the Protestant succession by requiring the practicers of the law in North Britain to take the oaths and subscribe the declaration therein mentioned.	The whole act.
1 Geo. 1. St. 2. c. 13	Security of the Sovereign Act 1714	An Act for the further security of His Majesty's person and government and the succession of the Crown in the heirs of the late Princess Sophia, being Protestants, and for extinguishing the hopes of the pretended Prince of Wales and his open and secret abettors.	The whole act.
1 Geo. 1. St. 2. c. 20	Treason in Scotland Act 1714	An Act the title of which begins with the words "An Act for encouraging" and ends with the words "disaffected persons in Scotland."	The whole act.
1 Geo. 1. St. 2. c. 26	Continuance of Laws, etc. Act 1714	An Act for continuing several laws therein mentioned relating to coals, hemp, and flax, Irish and Scotch linen, and the assize of bread, and for giving power to adjourn the quarter sessions for the county of Anglesea for the purposes therein mentioned.	The whole act.
8 Geo. 1. c. 6	Quakers Act 1721	An Act for granting the people called Quakers such forms of affirmation or declaration as may remove the difficulties which many of them lie under.	The whole act.
9 Geo. 2. c. 26	Indemnity, etc. Act 1735	An Act the title of which begins with the words "An Act for indemnifying" and ends with the words "and lessees."	The whole act.
19 Geo. 2. c. 39	Disarming the Highlands, etc. Act 1745	An Act the title of which begins with the words "An Act for the more effectual disarming" and ends with the words "to take the oaths to His Majesty, his heirs and successors, and to register the same."	The whole act.
18 Geo. 3. c. 60	Papists Act 1778	An Act for relieving His Majesty's subjects professing the popish religion from certain penalties and disabilities imposed on them by an Act made in the eleventh and twelfth years of the reign of King William the Third, intituled "An Act for the further preventing the growth of popery."	The whole act.
43 Geo. 3. c. 30	Roman Catholic Relief Act 1803	An Act to entitle Roman Catholics taking and subscribing the declaration and oath contained in the Act of the thirty-first year of the reign of His present Majesty, intituled "An Act to relieve, upon conditions and under restrictions, the persons therein described from certain penalties and disabilities to which papists or persons professing the popish religion are by law subject," to the benefits given by an Act of the eighteenth year of the reign of His present Majesty, intituled "An Act for relieving His Majesty's subjects professing the popish religion from certain penalties and disabilities imposed on them by an Act made in the eleventh and twelfth years of the reign of King William the Third, intituled 'An Act for the further preventing the growth of popery.'"	The whole act.
51 Geo. 3. c. 77	Parliamentary Elections (Ireland) Act 1811	An Act to amend the laws for regulating the election in Ireland of members to serve in Parliament.	The whole act.
57 Geo. 3. c. 92	Oaths, Land and Sea Forces Act 1817	An Act to regulate the administration of oaths in certain cases to officers in His Majesty's land and sea forces.	The whole act.
5 Geo. 4. c. 79	Oath, Revenue Officers Act 1824	An Act to enable certain persons to receive and hold offices in the management, collection, and receipt of the revenue without taking or subscribing certain oaths and declarations.	The whole act.
5 Geo. 4. c. 109	Oaths, Earl Marshal, etc. Act 1824	An Act to enable the Earl Marshal and his deputy to execute the duties of their office or offices without previously taking or subscribing certain oaths or declarations.	The whole act.
9 Geo. 4. c. 17	Sacramental Test Act 1828	An Act for repealing so much of several Acts as imposes the necessity of receiving the Sacrament of the Lord's Supper as a qualification for certain offices and employments.	The whole act.
1 & 2 Will. 4. c. 9	House of Commons, Oaths Act 1831	An Act to repeal so much of certain Acts as requires certain oaths to be taken by members of the House of Commons before the Lord Steward or his deputies.	The whole act.
1 & 2 Will. 4. c. 49	Oaths, Galway Act 1831	An Act the title of which begins with the words "An Act to repeal" and ends with the words "to Protestants only."	The whole act.
2 & 3 Will. 4. c. 7	Sacramental Test (Ireland) Act 1832	An Act the title of which begins with the words "An Act for the relief of" and ends with the words "taking the Sacramental Test."	The whole act.
2 & 3 Will. 4. c. 63	Election of Scottish Peers Act 1832	An Act to enable peers of Scotland to take and subscribe in Ireland the oaths required for qualifying them to vote in any election of the peers of Scotland.	The whole act.
5 & 6 Will. 4. c. 28	Declarations, etc., to be Taken by Sheriffs Act 1835	An Act for removing doubts as to the declaration to be made and oaths to be taken by persons appointed to the office of sheriff of any city or town being a county of itself.	The whole act.
1 & 2 Vict. c. 5	Declaration by Quakers, etc. Act 1837	An Act for the relief of Quakers, Moravians, and Separatists elected to municipal offices.	The whole act.
1 & 2 Vict. c. 15	Declarations by Quakers, etc., on Acceptance of Offices Act 1838	An Act for the further relief of Quakers, Moravians, and Separatists.	The whole act.
6 & 7 Vict. c. 28	Parliamentary Elections (Ireland) Act 1843	An Act to abolish the Roman Catholic oath as a qualification for electors in Ireland.	The whole act.
8 & 9 Vict. c. 52	Municipal Offices Act 1845	An Act for the relief of persons of the Jewish religion elected to municipal offices.	The whole act.
15 & 16 Vict. c. 35	Representative Peers (Scotland) Act 1852	An Act to amend an Act passed in the last session of Parliament, intituled "An Act to regulate certain proceedings in relation to the election of representative peers in Scotland."	The whole act.
15 & 16 Vict. c. 43	Parliamentary Oaths Act 1852	An Act to repeal certain disabilities under the first of George the First, chapter thirteen, and the sixth of George the Third, chapter fifty-three.	The whole act.
21 & 22 Vict. c. 48	Oaths of Allegiance, etc., and Relief of Jews Act 1858	An Act to substitute one oath for the oaths of allegiance, supremacy, and abjuration, and for the relief of Her Majesty's subjects professing the Jewish religion.	The whole act.
22 Vict. c. 10	Affirmations by Quakers, etc. Act 1859	An Act to settle the form of affirmation to be made in certain cases by Quakers and other persons by law permitted to make an affirmation instead of taking an oath.	The whole act.
29 & 30 Vict. c. 22	Declarations Before Taking Office Act 1866	An Act to make it unnecessary to make and subscribe certain declarations as a qualification for offices and employments, to indemnify such persons as have omitted to qualify themselves for office and employment, and for other purposes relating thereto.	The whole act.
20 Edw. 3 Ordinance for the Justices c. 1	Civil Procedure Act 1346	Ordinance for the justices.	Chapter one, from the words "and to the intent that our justices" to the end of that chapter, and chapter three.
20 Edw. 3 Ordinance for the Justices c. 3	Justices of Assize	Ordinance for the justices.	Chapter one, from the words "and to the intent that our justices" to the end of that chapter, and chapter three.
12 Ric. 2	Corrupt appointments to offices	Of the statute made at Cambridge in the twelfth year.	Chapter two.
13 Ric. 2. Stat. 1	Justices of the Peace Act 1389	Statute of the thirteenth year, statute the first.	Chapter seven, from the words "and that the said justices" to the end of that chapter.
1 Eliz. 1. c. 1	Act of Supremacy 1558	An Acte restoring to the Crowne thancyent jurisdiction over the state ecclesiastical and spuall, and abolyshing all forreine power repugnaunt to the same.	Sections ten to thirteen. (Note: Sects. 20 to 26. in the ordinary editions.)
27 Eliz. 1. c. 12	Swearing of Under-Sheriffs Act 1584	An Act for the swearinge of under-sherifes and other under-officers and mynisters.	Section one (Note: Sect. 2 in the ordinary editions.) from the words "for and concerning the supremacie" to the words "other corporal othe," and so much of section three (Note: Sect. 4. in the ordinary editions.) as relates to the oath of supremacy.
14 Cha. 2. c. 4 (Note: 13. & 14. Cha. 2 in the ordinary editions.)	Act of Uniformity 1662	An Act for the uniformity of publique prayers and administracon of Sacraments and other rites and ceremonies, and for establishing the form of making, ordaining, and consecrating bishops, priests, and deacons in the Church of England.	Section seven (Note: Sect. 9. in the ordinary editions.) from the words "that it is not lawful" down to the words "commissionated by him and."
1 Will. & Mar. (Note: Sess. 1. in the ordinary editions.) c. 1	Parliament Act 1688	An Act for removeing and preventing all questions and disputes concerning the assembling and sitting of this present Parlyament.	The whole Act, except section one. (Note: Sect. 2. in the ordinary editions.)
1 Will. & Mar. (Note: Sess. 1. in the ordinary editions.) c. 18	Toleration Act 1688	An Act for exempting their Majestyes' Protestant subjects dissenting from the Church of England from the penalties of certaine lawes.	The whole Act, except section five (Note: Sect. 7. in the ordinary editions.) and so much of section eight (Note: Sect. 11. in the ordinary editions.) as specifies the service and offices from which certain persons are exempt, and section fifteen (Note: Sect. 18. in the ordinary editions.).
7 & 8 Will. 3. c. 3	Treason Act 1695	An Act for regulateing of tryals in cases of treason and misprision of treason.	Section ten, from the words "mentioned in an Act of Parliament" to end of that section. (Note: This part of sect. 10 forms par of sect. 11. in the ordinary editions.)
1 Ann. St. 2. c. 21 (Note: Chap. 17. in the ordinary editions.)	Treason Act 1702	An Act for enlarging the time for taking the oath of abjuration, and also for recapacitating and indemnifying such persons as have not taken the same by the time limited, and shall take the same by a time to be appointed; and for the further security of Her Majestie's person, and the succession of the Crown in the Protestant line; and for extinguishing the hopes of the pretended Prince of Wales and all other pretenders, and their open and secret abettors.	The whole Act, except section three.
6 Ann. c. 11 (Note: 5 Ann. c. 8. in the ordinary editions.)	Union with Scotland Act 1706	An Act for an union of the two kingdoms of England and Scotland.	Section four (Note: Sect. 10. in the ordinary editions.), so far as it ratifies, approves, and confirms article twenty-two, from the words "and that when" to the end of that article.
6 Ann. c. 78 (Note: Chap. 23. in the ordinary editions.)	Scottish Representative Peers Act 1707	An Act to make further provision for electing and summoning sixteen peers of Scotland to sit in the House of Peers in the Parliament of Great Britain, and for trying peers for offences committed in Scotland, and for the further regulating of voters in elections of members to serve in Parliament.	Section four.
10 Ann. c. 10 (Note: Chap. 7. in the ordinary editions.)	Scottish Episcopalians Act 1711	An Act to prevent the disturbing those of the Episcopal communion in that part of Great Britain called Scotland in the exercise of their religious worship, and in the use of the Liturgy of the Church of England; and for repealing the Act passed in the Parliament of Scotland, intituled "An Act against irregular baptisms and marriages."	Section three.
10 Ann. c. 21 (Note: Chap. 12. in the ordinary editions.)	Church Patronage (Scotland) Act 1711	An Act to restore the patrons to their ancient rights of presenting ministers to the churches vacant in that part of Great Britain called Scotland.	Section six.
1 Geo. 1. St. 2. c. 6	Tithes and Church Rates Recovery Act 1714	An Act the title of which begins with the words "An Act for making perpetual," and ends with the words "oath of abjuration."	The whole Act, except section two.
5 Geo. 1. c. 29	Church Patronage (Scotland) Act 1718	An Act for making more effectual the laws appointing the oaths for security of the Government to be taken by ministers and preachers in churches and meeting houses in Scotland.	The whole Act, except section eight down to the words "vacant church," and from the words "who is then or shall be" to the end of the section, and section nine.
11 Geo. 1. c. 18	City of London Elections Act 1724	An Act for regulating elections within the city of London, and for preserving the peace, good order and government of the said city.	Section two from the beginning of the section to the words "rejected and disallowed."
20 Geo. 2. c. 43	Heritable Jurisdictions (Scotland) Act 1746	An Act the title of which begins with the words "An Act for taking away" and ends with the words "for rendering the union of the two kingdoms more complete."	Sections twenty-three and forty-four, and so much of section twenty-nine as relates to the taking of oaths.
21 Geo. 2. c. 34	Cattle Theft (Scotland) Act 1747	An Act the title of which begins with the words "An Act to amend and enforce" and ends with the words "therein mentioned."	The whole Act, except section twenty.
4 Geo. 3. c. 31	Indemnity Act 1763	An Act the title of which begins with the words "An Act to indemnify," and ends with the words "growing in forests and chases."	The whole Act, except section six so far as it relates to Scotland.
6 Geo. 3. c. 53	Treason Act 1766	An Act for altering the oath of abjuration and the assurance, and for amending so much of an Act of the seventh year of Her late Majesty Queen Anne, intituled "An Act for the improvement of the union of the two kingdoms," as after the time therein limited, requires the delivery of certain lists and copies therein mentioned to persons indicted of high treason or misprision of treason.	The whole Act, except section three.
13 Geo. 3. c. 21	British Nationality Act 1772	An Act the title of which begins with the words "An Act to extend the provisions of an Act" and ends with the words "of such children."	Section three.
19 Geo. 3. c. 44	Nonconformist Relief Act 1779	An Act for the further relief of Protestant dissenting ministers and schoolmasters.	Section one from the words "if he scruple" down to the words "subscribed by Protestant dissenting ministers and," and from the words "and by an Act made in the tenth year," down to the words "subscribe the declaration therein mentioned," and so much of the rest of the Act as relates to the oath and declaration mentioned in the part hereby repealed.
31 Geo. 3. c. 32	Roman Catholic Relief Act 1791	An Act to relieve, upon conditions and under restrictions, the persons therein described from certain penalties and disabilities to which papists or persons professing the popish religion are by law subject.	Sections one to four, nine, and eighteen to twenty-two, and so much of the rest of the Act as relates to the taking and subscribing any oath.
32 Geo. 3. c. 63	Scottish Episcopalians Relief Act 1792	An Act for granting relief to pastors, ministers, and lay persons of the Episcopal communion in Scotland.	The following words in section two, "take and subscribe the oaths of allegiance, abjuration, and assurance in such manner as all officers, civil and military, in Scotland are now by law obliged to take and subscribe the same, and shall also," and so much of sections three and four as relates to oaths.
38 Geo. 3. c. 5	Land Tax Act 1797	An Act for granting an aid to His Majesty by a land tax to be raised in Great Britain for the service of the year 1798.	Section forty-nine, from the words "the oaths appointed," down to the words "and likewise," and section one hundred and thirty-eight.
43 Geo. 3. c. 99	Taxes Act 1803	An Act for consolidating certain of the provisions contained in any Act or Acts relating to the duties under the management of the Commissioners for the Affairs of Taxes, and for amending the same.	Section five and section ten down to the words "which oaths or affirmations."
52 Geo. 3. c. 155	Places of Religious Worship Act 1812	An Act to repeal certain Acts and amend other Acts relating to religious worship and assemblies, and persons teaching or preaching therein.	So much as relates to any oaths, or to any declaration other than the declaration set forth in the part of 19 Geo. 3. c. 44. not repealed by this Act.
1 Geo. 4. c. 55	Kings' Bench Justices of Assize Act 1820	An Act for giving further facilities to the proceedings in the Court of King's Bench, and for giving certain powers to justices of assize.	Section four.
10 Geo. 4. c. 7	Roman Catholic Relief Act 1829	An Act for the relief of His Majesty's Roman Catholic subjects.	The whole Act, except section two, down to the words "vote therein;" section five, down to the words "duly qualified;" section eight, down to the words "duly qualified;" section nine; section ten, down to the words "as herein-after excepted;" sections eleven to eighteen; section twenty-three, down to the words "His Majesty's other subjects;" section twenty-four; sections twenty-six to thirty-eight, and the schedule.
2 & 3 Will. 4. c. 115	Roman Catholic Charities Act 1832	An Act for the better securing the charitable donations and bequests of His Majesty's subjects in Great Britain professing the Roman Catholic religion.	Section two.
3 & 4 Will. 4. c. 49	Quakers and Moravians Act 1833	An Act to allow Quakers and Moravians to make affirmation in all cases where an oath is or shall be required.	Section two.
5 & 6 Will. 4. c. 36	Parliamentary Elections Act 1835	An Act to limit the time of taking the poll in boroughs at contested elections of members to serve in Parliament to one day.	Section six.
5 & 6 Will. 4. c. 76	Municipal Corporations Act 1835	An Act to provide for the regulation of municipal corporations in England and Wales.	Section fifty, from the words "Provided always," to the end of that section.
7 Will. 4 & 1 Vict. c. 72	Lords Justices Act 1837	An Act to provide for the appointment of lords justices in the case of the next successor to the Crown being out of the realm at the time of the demise of Her Majesty.	Section seven, from the words "the oaths of allegiance and supremacy" down to the words "treason and also," and from the words "and shall also make and subscribe" to the words "offices and employments."
2 & 3 Vict. c. 33	Solicitors (Clerks) Act 1839	An Act to indemnify such persons in the United Kingdom as have omitted to qualify themselves for offices and employments, and for extending the time limited for those purposes respectively, until the twenty-fifth day of March one thousand eight hundred and forty, and for the relief of clerks to attornies and solicitors in certain cases.	The whole Act, except section nine.
3 & 4 Vict. c. 103	Dublin Justices Act 1840	An Act for the regulation of municipal corporations in Ireland.	Section eighty-five, from the words "Provided always" to the end of that section.
20 & 21 Vict. c. 77	Court of Probate Act 1857	An Act to amend the law relating to probates and letters of administration in England.	Section seven.
21 & 22 Vict. c. 49	Jews Relief Act 1858	An Act to provide for the relief of Her Majesty's subjects professing the Jewish religion.	Sections one, two, and three.
30 & 31 Vict. c. 75	Office and Oath Act 1867	An Act to remove certain religious disabilities affecting some of Her Majesty's subjects, and to amend the law relating to oaths of office.	Part of section one, from the words "oath herein-after substituted" down to the words "also any other," and sections five to seven.

Parliament of Scotland
Citation	Short title	Title	Extent of repeal
1661 (Jan. 1), c. 1 (S) (Note: Cha. 2. Parl. 1. sess. 1. c. 1. in Murray's edition.)	Oaths Act 1661	Act constituteing the Chancellour President in all time comeing And for takeing the oath of Parliament.	The whole act.
1661 (Feb. 27), c. 62 (S) (Note: Cha. 2. Parl. 1. sess. 1. c. 11. in Murray's edition.)	Oath of Allegiance Act 1661	Act anent the oath of alledgeance and acknowledgment of his Maties Prerogative by all publict Ministers.	The whole act.
1689 (Mar. 19), c. 5 (S)	Military Oath Act 1689	An order anent an oath to be taken by persones in military imployments.	The whole act.
1690 (May 12), c. 4 (S) (Note: Will. & Mar. Parl. 1. sess. 2. c. 4. in Murray's edition.)	Oath of Allegiance Act 1690	Act appointing the oath of allegeance to be taken by electors of commissioners to parliaments or conventions.	The whole act.
1690 (June 7), c. 9 (S) (Note: Will. & Mar. Parl. 1. sess. 2. c. 7. in Murray's edition.)	Oath of Allegiance (No. 2) Act 1690	Act ordaineing the commissioners of supply and their collectors and clerkes to take the oath of allegeance.	The whole act.
1693 (May 19), c. 14 (S) (Note: 1693 (May 23), c. 6. in Murray's edition.)	Oath of Allegiance Act 1693	Act for takeing the oath of allegiance and assurance.	The whole act.
1617 (June 28), Act 8 (S)	Justice of Peace Act 1617	Anent the Justices for keiping of the kingis M: peace and thair constables.	Section one.
1661 (July 9), c. 338 (S)	Justices of the Peace Act 1661	Commission and instructions to the justices of peace and constables.	From the words "the justices of peace at thair first sitting" to the words "so help me God."
1689 (June 17), c. 2 (S) (Note: Will. & Mar. Parl. 1. ses. 1. c. 2. in Murray's edition.)	Oath of Allegiance Act 1689	Act recognizing their Majesties Royall authoritie and for taking the oath of alledgeance.	From the words "and farder their Majesties with advyce and consent forsaid doe statute and ordaine that the oath of alledgiance" to the words "so help me God."

Parliament of Ireland
Citation	Short title	Title	Extent of repeal
8 Anne c. 3 (I)	Popery Act 1709	An Act for explaining and amending an Act intituled "An Act to prevent the further growth of Popery."	The whole act.
6 Geo. 1. c. 9 (I)	N/A	An Act for quieting and discharging all persons in offices or employments from the penalties they may have incurred by not qualifying themselves pursuant to an Act to prevent the further growth of Popery; and for limiting the time for prosecutions on the said Act.	The whole act.
1 Geo. 2. c. 2 (I)	N/A	An Act for allowing further time to persons in offices to qualify themselves pursuant to an Act intituled "An Act to prevent the further growth of Popery."	The whole act.
1 Geo. 2. c. 20 (I)	N/A	An Act for regulating the admissions of barristers-at-law, six clerks, and attorneys, and of other persons, into offices and employments, and for preventing Papists practising as solicitors, and further strengthening the Protestant interest in this kingdom.	The whole act.
19 Geo. 2. c. 18 (I)	N/A	An Act for accepting the solemn affirmation or declaration of the people called Quakers instead of an oath in the usual form.	The whole act.
13 & 14 Geo. 3. c. 35 (I)	Roman Catholic Relief Act 1773	An Act to enable His Majesty's subjects, of whatever persuasion, to testify their allegiance to him.	The whole act.
21 & 22 Geo. 3. c. 26 (I)	N/A	An Act for rendering the manner of conforming from the Popish to the Protestant religion more easy and expeditious.	The whole act.
21 & 22 Geo. 3. c. 57 (I)	N/A	An Act for the relief of His Majesty's Protestant Dissenting Subjects called Seceders.	The whole act.
2 Eliz. 1. c. 1 (I)	Act of Supremacy (Ireland) 1560	An Act restoring to the Crown the ancient jurisdiction over the state Ecclesiasticall and Spirituall, and abolishing all Forreine Power repugnant to the same.	Sections seven to eleven, both inclusive.
2 Anne. c. 6 (I)	Popery Act 1703	An Act to prevent the further growth of Popery.	The whole Act, except section twenty-five.
4 Geo. 1. c. 9 (I)	N/A	An Act for reviving, continuing, and amending several Statutes made in this kingdom heretofore temporary.	Sections one, two, three, and four.
6 Geo. 1. c. 5 (I)	Toleration Act 1719	An Act for exempting the Protestant Dissenters of this kingdom from certain penalties to which they are now subject.	The whole Act, except sections four, five, six, seven, eight, and fourteen, fifteen, and sixteen.
7 Geo. 2. c. 5 (I)	Solicitors Act 1733	An Act for the amendment of the law in relation to Popish solicitors, and for remedying other mischiefs in relation to the practitioners in the several courts of law and equity.	Section two, from the words "and every person" to the words "particularly mentioned;" and sections four and sixteen.
17 & 18 Geo. 3. c. 49 (I)	Leases for Lives Act 1777	An Act for the relief of His Majesty's subjects of this kingdom professing the Popish religion.	The words following in section one, "subject to the proviso herein-after contained as to the taking and subscribing the oath and declaration therein mentioned;" and sections three and four.
21 & 22 Geo. 3. c. 24 (I)	Roman Catholic Relief Act 1782	An Act for the further relief of his Majesty's subjects of this kingdom professing the Popish religion.	The whole Act, except sections twelve, thirteen, and fourteen.
21 & 22 Geo. 3. c. 48 (I)	Calendar Act 1781	An Act for extending certain of the provisions contained in an Act intituled "An Act confirming all the statutes made in England."	Section three, from the words "and also such clauses" down to the words "for omitting the same."
21 & 22 Geo. 3. c. 62 (I)	N/A	An Act to allow persons professing the Popish religion to teach such in this kingdom, and for regulating the education of Papists; and also to repeal parts of certain laws relative to the guardianship of their children.	Section two, and section five, from the words "who shall have taken" down to the words "except an ecclesiastick."
33 Geo. 3. c. 21 (I)	Relief of Insolvent Debtors Act 1791	An Act for the relief of Her Majesty's Popish or Roman Catholic subjects in Ireland.	Section six, from the words "who shall have at the sessions" down to the words "their allegiance to him;" section seven, from the words "provided that every such person" down to the words "so help me God;" section nine; section thirteen, from the words "save the oaths" down to the words "the contrary notwithstanding;" and sections fifteen and sixteen.

Indemnity Acts
Citation	Short title	Title	Extent of repeal
11 Geo. 3. c. 18	Indemnity Act 1771	An Act the title of which begins with the words "An Act to indemnify," and ends with the words "for those purposes."	The whole act.
13 Geo. 3. c. 12	Indemnity (No. 2) Act 1772	An Act the title of which begins with the words "An Act to indemnify," and ends with the words "attornies and solicitors."	The whole act.
14 Geo. 3. c. 47	Indemnity Act 1774	An Act the title of which begins with the words "An Act to indemnify," and ends with the words "attornies and solicitors."	The whole act.
15 Geo. 3. c. 17	Indemnity Act 1775	An Act the title of which begins with the words "An Act to indemnify," and ends with the words "attornies and solicitors."	The whole act.
16 Geo. 3. c. 50	Indemnity Act 1776	An Act the title of which begins with the words "An Act to indemnify," and ends with the words "attornies and solicitors."	The whole act.
17 Geo. 3. c. 37	Indemnity Act 1776	An Act the title of which begins with the words "An Act to indemnify," and ends with the words "attornies and solicitors."	The whole act.
18 Geo. 3. c. 39	Indemnity Act 1778	An Act the title of which begins with the words "An Act to indemnify," and ends with the words "attornies and solicitors."	The whole act.
19 Geo. 3. c. 47	Indemnity Act 1779	An Act the title of which begins with the words "An Act to indemnify," and ends with the words "attornies and solicitors."	The whole act.
20 Geo. 3. c. 47	Indemnity Act 1780	An Act the title of which begins with the words "An Act to indemnify," and ends with the words "attornies and solicitors."	The whole act.
21 Geo. 3. c. 25	Indemnity Act 1781	An Act the title of which begins with the words "An Act to indemnify," and ends with the words "attornies and solicitors."	The whole act.
22 Geo. 3. c. 55	Indemnity Act 1782	An Act the title of which begins with the words "An Act to indemnify," and ends with the words "attornies and solicitors."	The whole act.
23 Geo. 3. c. 30	Indemnity Act 1783	An Act the title of which begins with the words "An Act to indemnify," and ends with the words "attornies and solicitors."	The whole act.
24 Geo. 3. Sess. 2. c. 58	Indemnity Act 1784	An Act the title of which begins with the words "An Act to indemnify," and ends with the words "apprentices and servants."	The whole act.
25 Geo. 3. c. 82	Indemnity Act 1785	An Act the title of which begins with the words "An Act to indemnify," and ends with the words "proceedings valid."	The whole act.
26 Geo. 3. c. 98	Indemnity Act 1786	An Act the title of which begins with the words "An Act to indemnify," and ends with the words "attornies and solicitors."	The whole act.
27 Geo. 3. c. 40	Indemnity Act 1787	An Act the title of which begins with the words "An Act to indemnify," and ends with the words "attornies and solicitors."	The whole act.
28 Geo. 3. c. 22	Indemnity Act 1788	An Act the title of which begins with the words "An Act to indemnify," and ends with the words "for that purpose."	The whole act.
29 Geo. 3. c. 40	Indemnity Act 1789	An Act the title of which begins with the words "An Act to indemnify," and ends with the words "for that purpose."	The whole act.
30 Geo. 3. c. 12	Indemnity Act 1790	An Act the title of which begins with the words "An Act to indemnify," and ends with the words "for that purpose."	The whole act.
31 Geo. 3. c. 8	Indemnity Act 1791	An Act the title of which begins with the words "An Act to indemnify," and ends with the words "for that purpose."	The whole act.
32 Geo. 3. c. 27	Indemnity Act 1792	An Act the title of which begins with the words "An Act to indemnify," and ends with the words "apprentices or servants."	The whole act.
33 Geo. 3. c. 12	Indemnity Act 1793	An Act the title of which begins with the words "An Act to indemnify," and ends with the words "for that purpose."	The whole act.
34 Geo. 3. c. 12	Indemnity Act 1794	An Act the title of which begins with the words "An Act to indemnify," and ends with the words "for that purpose."	The whole act.
35 Geo. 3. c. 50	Indemnity Act 1795	An Act the title of which begins with the words "An Act to indemnify," and ends with the words "apprentices or servants."	The whole act.
36 Geo. 3. c. 57	Indemnity Act 1796	An Act the title of which begins with the words "An Act to indemnify," and ends with the words "for that purpose."	The whole act.
37 Geo. 3. c. 11	Indemnity (No. 2) Act 1796	An Act the title of which begins with the words "An Act to indemnify," and ends with the words "for that purpose."	The whole act.
38 Geo. 3. c. 14	Indemnity (No. 2) Act 1797	An Act the title of which begins with the words "An Act to indemnify," and ends with the words "September first, one thousand seven hundred and ninety-eight."	The whole act.
39 Geo. 3. c. 17	Indemnity Act 1799	An Act the title of which begins with the words "An Act to indemnify," and ends with the words "until the first day of September one thousand seven hundred and ninety-nine."	The whole act.
39 & 40 Geo. 3. c. 19	Indemnity Act 1800	An Act the title of which begins with the words "An Act to indemnify," and ends with the words "until the first day of September one thousand eight hundred."	The whole act.
41 Geo. 3. (G.B.) c. 31	Indemnity (No. 2) Act 1800	An Act the title of which begins with the words "An Act to indemnify," and ends with the words "first day of September one thousand eight hundred and one."	The whole act.
42 Geo. 3. c. 23	Indemnity Act 1802	An Act the title of which begins with the words "An Act to indemnify," and ends with the words "until the first day of September one thousand eight hundred and two."	The whole act.
43 Geo. 3. c. 6	Indemnity (No. 2) Act 1802	An Act the title of which begins with the words "An Act to indemnify," and ends with the words "first day of Michaelmas Term one thousand eight hundred and three."	The whole act.
44 Geo. 3. c. 7	Indemnity Act 1803	An Act the title of which begins with the words "An Act to indemnify," and ends with the words "the first day of Michaelmas Term one thousand eight hundred and four."	The whole act.
45 Geo. 3. c. 6	Indemnity Act 1805	An Act the title of which begins with the words "An Act to indemnify," and ends with the words "the first day of Michaelmas Term one thousand eight hundred and five."	The whole act.
46 Geo. 3. c. 7	Indemnity Act 1806	An Act the title of which begins with the words "An Act to indemnify," and ends with the words "the first day of Michaelmas Term one thousand eight hundred and six."	The whole act.
47 Geo. 3 Sess. 1. c. 5	Indemnity Act 1807	An Act the title of which begins with the words "An Act to indemnify," and ends with the words "the first day of Michaelmas Term one thousand eight hundred and seven."	The whole act.
47 Geo. 3 Sess. 2. c. 35	Indemnity (No. 3) Act 1807	An Act the title of which begins with the words "An Act to indemnify," and ends with the words "the first day of Hilary Term one thousand eight hundred and eight."	The whole act.
48 Geo. 3. c. 40	Indemnity Act 1808	An Act the title of which begins with the words "An Act to indemnify," and ends with the words "the first day of Hilary Term one thousand eight hundred and nine."	The whole act.
49 Geo. 3. c. 15	Indemnity Act 1809	An Act the title of which begins with the words "An Act to indemnify," and ends with the words "the first day of Hilary term one thousand eight hundred and ten."	The whole act.
50 Geo. 3. c. 4	Indemnity Act 1810	An Act the title of which begins with the words "An Act to indemnify," and ends with the words "the first day of Hilary Term one thousand eight hundred and eleven."	The whole act.
51 Geo. 3. c. 98	Indemnity (No. 3) Act 1811	An Act the title of which begins with the words "An Act to indemnify," and ends with the words "the next session of Parliament."	The whole act.
52 Geo. 3. c. 26	Indemnity Act 1812	An Act the title of which begins with the words "An Act to indemnify," and ends with the words "the first day of Hilary Term one thousand eight hundred and thirteen."	The whole act.
54 Geo. 3. c. 5	Indemnity Act 1813	An Act the title of which begins with the words "An Act to indemnify," and ends with the words "the first day of Hilary Term one thousand eight hundred and fifteen."	The whole act.
55 Geo. 3. c. 17	Indemnity Act 1815	An Act the title of which begins with the words "An Act to indemnify," and ends with the words "the first day of Hilary Term one thousand eight hundred and sixteen."	The whole act.
56 Geo. 3. c. 33	Indemnity Act 1816	An Act the title of which begins with the words "An Act to indemnify," and ends with the words "the first day of Hilary Term one thousand eight hundred and seventeen."	The whole act.
57 Geo. 3. c. 14	Indemnity Act 1817	An Act the title of which begins with the words "An Act to indemnify," and ends with the words "the first day of Hilary Term one thousand eight hundred and eighteen."	The whole act.
58 Geo. 3. c. 5	Indemnity Act 1818	An Act the title of which begins with the words "An Act to indemnify," and ends with the words "their annual certificates."	The whole act.
59 Geo. 3. c. 11	Indemnity Act 1819	An Act the title of which begins with the words "An Act to indemnify," and ends with the words "their annual certificates."	The whole act.
60 Geo. 3 & 1 Geo. 4. c. 10	Indemnity Act 1820	An Act the title of which begins with the words "An Act to indemnify," and ends with the words "their annual certificates."	The whole act.
1 & 2 Geo. 4. c. 5	Indemnity Act 1821	An Act the title of which begins with the words "An Act to indemnify," and ends with the words "their annual certificates."	The whole act.
3 Geo. 4. c. 12	Indemnity Act 1822	An Act the title of which begins with the words "An Act to indemnify," and ends with the words "their annual certificates."	The whole act.
4 Geo. 4. c. 1	Indemnity Act 1823	An Act the title of which begins with the words "An Act to indemnify," and ends with the words "their annual certificates."	The whole act.
5 Geo. 4. c. 6	Indemnity Act 1824	An Act the title of which begins with the words "An Act to indemnify," and ends with the words "their annual certificates."	The whole act.
6 Geo. 4. c. 3	Indemnity Act 1825	An Act to indemnify such persons in the United Kingdom as have omitted to qualify themselves for offices and employments, and for extending the time limited for those purposes respectively.	The whole act.
7 Geo. 4. c. 3	Indemnity Act 1826	An Act to indemnify such persons in the United Kingdom as have omitted to qualify themselves for offices and employments, and for extending the time limited for those purposes respectively.	The whole act.
7 & 8 Geo. 4. c. 13	Indemnity Act 1827	An Act to indemnify such persons in the United Kingdom as have omitted to qualify themselves for offices and employments, and for extending the time limited for those purposes respectively.	The whole act.
9 Geo. 4. c. 6	Indemnity Act 1828	An Act the title of which begins with the words "An Act to indemnify," and ends with the words "one thousand eight hundred and twenty-nine."	The whole act.
10 Geo. 4. c. 12	Indemnity Act 1829	An Act the title of which begins with the words "An Act to indemnify," and ends with the words "one thousand eight hundred and thirty."	The whole act.
11 Geo. 4 & 1 Will. 4. c. 9	Indemnity Act 1830	An Act the title of which begins with the words "An Act to indemnify," and ends with the words "annual certificates."	The whole act.
1 Will. 4. c. 26	Indemnity Act 1831	An Act the title of which begins with the words "An Act to indemnify," and ends with the words "annual certificates."	The whole act.
2 & 3 Will. 4. c. 24 (Note: This act is incorrectly cited as "2 Will. 4. c. 24".)	Indemnity Act 1832	An Act the title of which begins with the words "An Act to indemnify," and ends with the words "annual certificates."	The whole act.
3 & 4 Will. 4. c. 7	Indemnity Act 1833	An Act the title of which begins with the words "An Act to indemnify," and ends with the words "annual certificates."	The whole act.
4 & 5 Will. 4. c. 9	Indemnity Act 1834	An Act the title of which begins with the words "An Act to indemnify," and ends with the words "annual certificates."	The whole act.
5 & 6 Will. 4. c. 11	Indemnity Act 1835	An Act the title of which begins with the words "An Act to indemnify," and ends with the words "annual certificates."	The whole act.
6 & 7 Will. 4. c. 7	Indemnity Act 1836	An Act the title of which begins with the words "An Act to indemnify," and ends with the words "annual certificates."	The whole act.
7 Will. 4 & 1 Vict. c. 12	Indemnity Act 1837	An Act to indemnify such persons in the United Kingdom as have omitted to qualify themselves for offices and employments, and for extending the time limited for those purposes respectively until the 25th day of March 1838, and for the relief of clerks to attorneys and solicitors in certain cases.	The whole act.
1 & 2 Vict. c. 16	Indemnity Act 1838	An Act the title of which begins with the words "An Act to indemnify," and ends with the words "in certain cases."	The whole act.
3 & 4 Vict. c. 16	Indemnity Act 1840	An Act the title of which begins with the words "An Act to indemnify," and ends with the words "in certain cases."	The whole act.
4 & 5 Vict. c. 11	Indemnity Act 1841	An Act the title of which begins with the words "An Act to indemnify," and ends with the words "in certain cases."	The whole act.
5 & 6 Vict. c. 10	Indemnity Act 1842	An Act the title of which begins with the words "An Act to indemnify," and ends with the words "in certain cases."	The whole act.
6 & 7 Vict. c. 9	Indemnity Act 1843	An Act the title of which begins with the words "An Act to indemnify," and ends with the words "in certain cases."	The whole act.
7 & 8 Vict. c. 10	Indemnity Act 1844	An Act the title of which begins with the words "An Act to indemnify," and ends with the words "the twenty-fifth day of March one thousand eight hundred and forty-five."	The whole act.
8 & 9 Vict. c. 24	Indemnity Act 1845	An Act the title of which begins with the words "An Act to indemnify," and ends with the words "the twenty-fifth day of March one thousand eight hundred and forty-six."	The whole act.
9 & 10 Vict. c. 13	Indemnity Act 1846	An Act the title of which begins with the words "An Act to indemnify," and ends with the words "the twenty-fifth day of March one thousand eight hundred and forty-seven."	The whole act.
10 & 11 Vict. c. 18	Indemnity Act 1847	An Act the title of which begins with the words "An Act to indemnify," and ends with the words "the twenty-fifth day of March one thousand eight hundred and forty-eight."	The whole act.
11 & 12 Vict. c. 19	Indemnity Act 1848	An Act the title of which begins with the words "An Act to indemnify," and ends with the words "the twenty-fifth day of March one thousand eight hundred and forty-nine."	The whole act.
12 & 13 Vict. c. 9	Indemnity Act 1849	An Act the title of which begins with the words "An Act to indemnify," and ends with the words "the twenty-fifth day of March one thousand eight hundred and fifty."	The whole act.
13 & 14 Vict. c. 12	Indemnity Act 1850	An Act the title of which begins with the words "An Act to indemnify," and ends with the words "purposes respectively."	The whole act.
14 & 15 Vict. c. 10	Indemnity Act 1851	An Act the title of which begins with the words "An Act to indemnify," and ends with the words "purposes respectively."	The whole act.
15 & 16 Vict. c. 4	Indemnity Act 1852	An Act the title of which begins with the words "An Act to indemnify," and ends with the words "purposes respectively."	The whole act.
16 & 17 Vict. c. 14	Indemnity Act 1853	An Act the title of which begins with the words "An Act to indemnify," and ends with the words "purposes respectively."	The whole act.
17 & 18 Vict. c. 39	Indemnity Act 1854	An Act the title of which begins with the words "An Act to indemnify," and ends with the words "purposes respectively."	The whole act.
18 & 19 Vict. c. 49	Indemnity Act 1855	An Act the title of which begins with the words "An Act to indemnify," and ends with the words "purposes respectively."	The whole act.
19 & 20 Vict. c. 73	Indemnity Act 1856	An Act the title of which begins with the words "An Act to indemnify," and ends with the words "purposes respectively."	The whole act.
20 Vict. c. 7	Indemnity Act 1857	An Act the title of which begins with the words "An Act to indemnify," and ends with the words "purposes respectively."	The whole act.
21 & 22 Vict. c. 54	Indemnity Act 1858	An Act the title of which begins with the words "An Act to indemnify," and ends with the words "purposes respectively."	The whole act.
22 Vict. c. 15	Indemnity Act 1859	An Act the title of which begins with the words "An Act to indemnify," and ends with the words "purposes respectively."	The whole act.
23 & 24 Vict. c. 40	Indemnity Act 1860	An Act the title of which begins with the words "An Act to indemnify," and ends with the words "purposes respectively."	The whole act.
24 & 25 Vict. c. 77	Indemnity Act 1861	An Act the title of which begins with the words "An Act to indemnify," and ends with the words "purposes respectively."	The whole act.
25 & 26 Vict. c. 60	Indemnity Act 1862	An Act the title of which begins with the words "An Act to indemnify," and ends with the words "purposes respectively."	The whole act.
26 & 27 Vict. c. 107	Indemnity Act 1863	An Act the title of which begins with the words "An Act to indemnify," and ends with the words "purposes respectively."	The whole act.
27 & 28 Vict. c. 49	Indemnity Act 1864	An Act the title of which begins with the words "An Act to indemnify," and ends with the words "purposes respectively."	The whole act.
28 & 29 Vict. c. 97	Indemnity Act 1865	An Act the title of which begins with the words "An Act to indemnify," and ends with the words "purposes respectively."	The whole act.
29 & 30 Vict. c. 116	Indemnity Act 1866	An Act the title of which begins with the words "An Act to indemnify," and ends with the words "purposes respectively."	The whole act.
30 & 31 Vict. c. 88	Indemnity Act 1867	An Act the title of which begins with the words "An Act to indemnify," and ends with the words "purposes respectively."	The whole act.

== See also ==
- Oaths Act
- Statute Law Revision Act
