= Oaths Act, 1873 =

Disallowed Canadian law

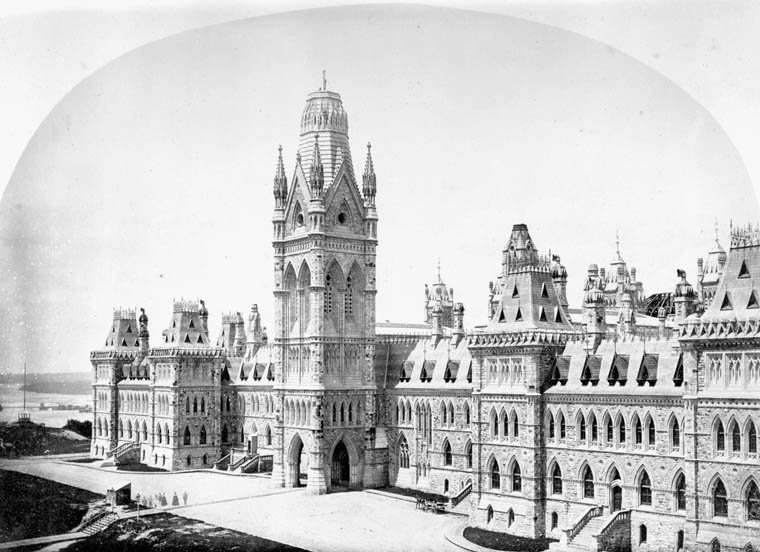

Parliament of Canada
- Long title: An Act to provide for the examination of witnesses on Oath by Committees of the Senate and House of Commons, in certain cases
- Citation: S.C. 1873, c. 1
- Enacted by: Parliament of Canada
- Royal assent: May 3, 1873
- Disallowed: July 1, 1873

Legislative history
- Bill citation: 2nd Parliament, 1st session
- Introduced by: John Hillyard Cameron
- First reading: April 18, 1873
- Second reading: April 21, 1873
- Third reading: April 21, 1873
- Status: Disallowed

The Oaths Act, 1873, was a statute passed by the Parliament of Canada in 1873 which authorized any committee of the Senate or House of Commons to examine witnesses under oath.

The enactment was subsequently disallowed by the government of the United Kingdom as it was deemed ultra vires. The Oaths Act, 1873 is the only instance of an enactment of Canadian Parliament to be disallowed by the government of the United Kingdom.

== Background ==
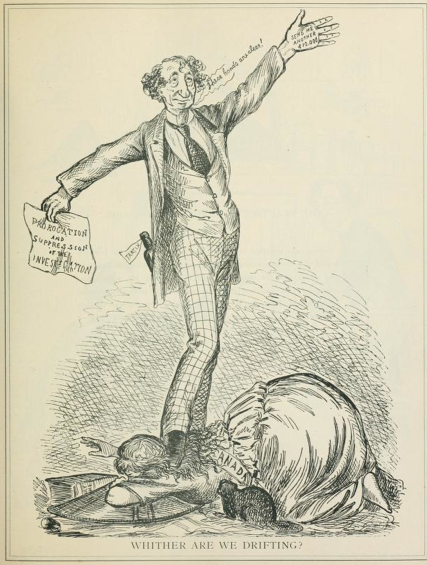
"Whither are we drifting?" Macdonald is shown triumphant at obtaining a prorogation in the wake of the Pacific Scandal, but is trampling a weeping Canada and apparently drunk with bottle in pocket in this August 1873 cartoon by John Wilson Bengough. Macdonald is depicted claiming clean hands, but with "Send me another $10,000" written on his palm.

=== Pacific Sandal ===
The Pacific Scandal was a political scandal in 1870s Canada involving bribes accepted by 150 members of the Conservative government in the attempts of private interests to influence the bidding for a national rail contract.

Prime Minister John A. Macdonald had hoped to award the charter for the Canadian Pacific Railway in early 1872, but negotiations dragged on between the government and the financiers. Macdonald's government awarded the group led by Hugh Allan the charter in late 1872. In 1873, when Parliament opened, Liberal member of parliament Lucius Seth Huntington charged that government ministers had been bribed with large, undisclosed political contributions to award the charter. Documents soon came to light which substantiated what came to be known as the Pacific Scandal. The Allan-led financiers, who were secretly backed by the United States's Northern Pacific Railway, had donated CA$179,000 to the Conservative Party election funds, they had received the charter, and Opposition newspapers began to publish telegrams signed by government ministers requesting large sums from the railway interest at the time the charter was under consideration. Macdonald had taken CA$45,000 in contributions from the railway interest himself. Substantial sums went to George-Étienne Cartier, who waged an expensive fight to try to retain his seat in Montreal East (he was defeated, but was subsequently returned for the Manitoba seat of Provencher). During the campaign Cartier had fallen ill with Bright's disease, which may have been causing his judgment to lapse; he died in May 1873 while seeking treatment in London.

Before Cartier's death, Macdonald attempted to use delay to extricate the government. The Opposition responded by leaking documents to friendly newspapers. On July 18, three papers published a telegram dated August 1872 from Macdonald requesting another $10,000 and promising "it will be the last time of asking". Macdonald was able to get a prorogation of Parliament in August by appointing a Royal Commission to look into the matter.

Liberal member of the House of Commons for Shefford Lucius Seth Huntington put forward a motion to form a parliamentary committee to investigate the Pacific Scandal, and gave a slow outline of his charges in the house. Historian Donald Creighton describes Huntington's speech as an inflammatory, and designed to provoke conservative ministers into debate, which was unsuccessful as Macdonald made no statements and required silence from his party. Huntington's motion was regarded by the house as a confidence vote and was rejected by the Conservative-dominated house 76—107. Macdonald relented and appointed a five-member committee to investigate the allegations the next day, with conservative member of the House of Commons for Cardwell John Hillyard Cameron appointed to chair the committee investigating the Pacific Scandal. Cameron himself had received $5,000 from Allan to finance his campaign in the 1872 election, and was regarded with suspicion by the Liberal members of parliament. The two other conservative members were Joseph-Goderic Blanchet and James McDonald, and the liberal members were Edward Blake and Antoine-Aimé Dorion.

== Provisions ==
The Oaths Act was introduced, and given its first reading in the 2nd Parliament on April 18, 1873, by John Hillyard Cameron. The bill was quickly passed the House of Commons with the second and third readings occurring days later on April 21. The bill subsequently passed the Senate without amendment a few days later on April 29. Governor General Frederick Temple Blackwood provided royal assent on May 3, 1873.

The Oaths Act was short and included only four sections. The first section permitted a committee of the Senate or House of Commons to examine a witness under oath. The second section permitted the oath to be administered by the chairman of the committee. The third section provided that a witness who provided false evidence was subject to the penalties of perjury. The fourth section provided the text of the oath.

Section 4: The oath or affirmation aforesaid shall be in the following form: "The evidence you shall give on this examination shall be the truth, the whole truth, and nothing but the truth. So help you God."

=== Disallowance ===
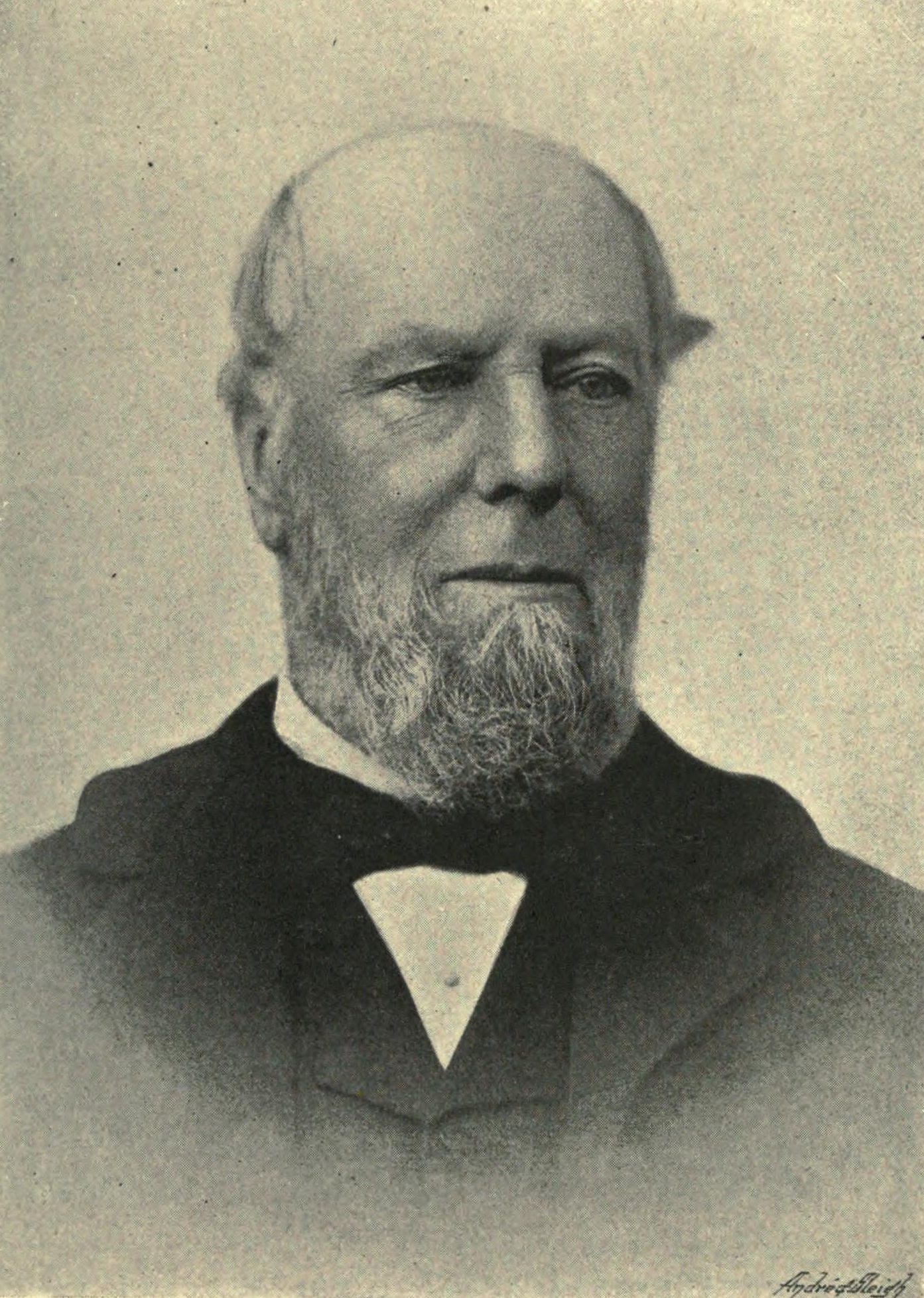
John Wodehouse, 1st Earl of Kimberley recommended the Oaths Act be disallowed as outside the competency of Parliament.

Following the passage of the Oaths Act on April 30, 1873, in his role as minister of justice, John A. Macdonald wrote the government of the United Kingdom noting the bill had been passed and questioned whether Parliament had the authority to pass such a bill. Macdonald stated his conclusion "...although not without doubt, that this bill is not within the competency or jurisdiction of the Canadian Parliament". Governor General Lord Dufferin also provided noted his concern over the bill, but noted he chose to provide royal assent based on the precedent of a previous bill passed in 1868 which provided the authority for the Senate to question witnesses at the bar, which was not a power granted to the British House of Commons. Dufferin felt he could not withhold royal assent with the previous precedent in place, and he also noted the immense controversy of the Pacific Scandal on the Macdonald government and their willingness to pass the Act. Dufferin also sought an opinion from parliamentary scholar Alpheus Todd, which assured him Canadian Parliament had the authority to pass the Oaths Act.

In his response Secretary of State for the Colonies Earl Kimberley, noted that he had sought legal advice and found the Oaths Act ultra vires of the British North America Act, 1867, and recommended the disallowance of the enactment, which occurred on July 1, 1873. Earl Kimberley also noted the Act passed in 1868 which provided the Senate with the authority to question witnesses at the bar "escaped observation" and should have been disallowed, but noted those provisions are inoperative as they are repugnant of the provisions of the British North America Act, 1867.

== Aftermath ==
=== Macdonald government ===
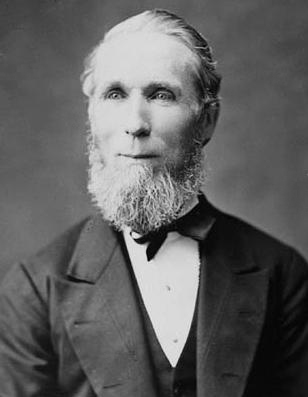
Alexander Mackenzie became the Prime Minister following the fall of the Macdonald government.

When Parliament reconvened in late October 1873, the Liberals, feeling Macdonald could be defeated over the issue, applied immense pressure to wavering members. On November 3, Macdonald rose in the Commons to defend the government, and according to one of his biographers, P. B. Waite, he gave "the speech of his life, and, in a sense, for his life". He began his speech at 9 p.m., looking frail and ill, an appearance which quickly improved. As he spoke, he consumed numerous glasses of gin and water. He denied that there had been a corrupt bargain, and stated that such contributions were common to both political parties. After five hours, Macdonald concluded,

I leave it with this House with every confidence. I am equal to either fortune. I can see past the decision of this House either for or against me, but whether it be against me or for me, I know, and it is no vain boast to say so, for even my enemies will admit that I am no boaster, that there does not exist in Canada a man who has given more of his time, more of his heart, more of his wealth, or more of his intellect and power, as it may be, for the good of this Dominion of Canada.

Macdonald's speech was seen as a personal triumph, but it did little to salvage the fortunes of his government. With eroding support both in the Commons and among the public, Macdonald went to the Governor General, Lord Dufferin on November 5, and resigned; Liberal leader Alexander Mackenzie became the second prime minister of Canada. He is not known to have spoken of the events of the Pacific Scandal again.

On November 6, 1873, Macdonald offered his resignation as party leader to his caucus; it was refused. Mackenzie called an election for January 1874; the Conservatives were reduced to 70 seats out of the 206 in the Commons, giving Mackenzie a massive majority. The Conservatives bested the Liberals only in British Columbia; Mackenzie had called the terms by which the province had joined Confederation "impossible". Macdonald was returned in Kingston but was unseated on an election contest when bribery was proven; he won the ensuing by-election by 17 votes. According to Swainson, most observers viewed Macdonald as finished in politics, "a used-up and dishonoured man".

=== Disallowance of legislation in Canada ===
Section 18 of the British North America Act was subsequently amended by the Parliament of the United Kingdom with the Parliament of Canada Act, 1875. The Canadian House of Commons and the Senate were provided the same privileges possessed by the British House of Commons which now included the authority to examine witnesses under oath. The Canadian Parliament subsequently passed a new Oaths Act in 1875.

Political scientist Andrew Heard argues that disallowance of federal law has been effectively forbidden by constitutional convention in Canada since 1942 when the Governor General was no longer permitted to forward Acts of Canadian Parliament to the government of the United Kingdom. As the Constitution Act provides the government of the United Kingdom with two years to disallow an enactment upon receipt of an official copy of the legislation, an Act of Canadian Parliament cannot be disallowed under section 56 as it can not be received by the British government. This constitutional convention was reinforced with the Letters Patent, 1947, removing the Governor General's responsibility to forward official copies of legislation to the government of the United Kingdom, and the subsequent repeal of The Publication of Statutes Act.

== See also ==
- Disallowance and reservation in Canada
