= Oath of Allegiance (United Kingdom) =

Promise to be loyal to the British monarch

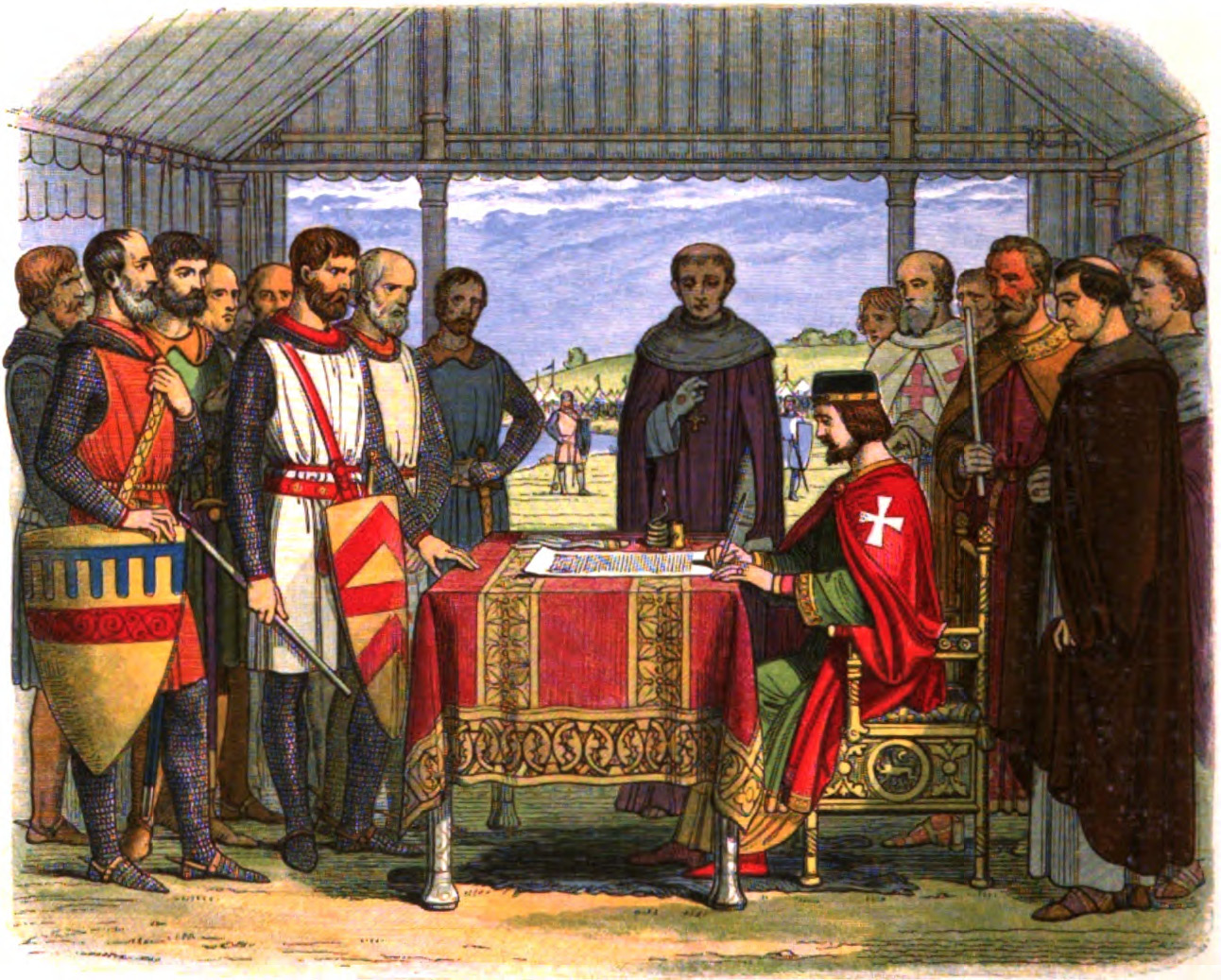
King John signing Magna Carta at Runnymede

The Oath of Allegiance (also referred to as the Judicial Oath or Official Oath) is a pledge of loyalty to the reigning British monarch, their heirs, and successors, sworn by certain public servants in the United Kingdom, and by new citizens at British citizenship ceremonies. The current wording is prescribed by the Promissory Oaths Act 1868, with alternative solemn affirmations permitted under the Oaths Act 1978. Variants of the basic oath appear in other official oaths for specific roles, including members of Parliament, judges, and armed forces personnel. (Note: Historically, members of the Royal Navy 'entered' service (rather than enlisted) and did not swear an oath as the Navy's existence stems from the Sovereign’s prerogative rather than an act of parliament. However, since the Armed Forces Act 2006, ratings have 'enlisted' in line with the other services and are required to take the oath or affirmation. Commissioned officers of the Royal Navy are still not required to take the oath or affirmation.)

== Text ==
The standard oath of allegiance is set out in the Promissory Oaths Act 1868 as follows:

I, [full name], do swear that I will be faithful and bear true allegiance to His Majesty King Charles, his heirs and successors, according to law. So help me God.

Under the Oaths Act 1978, individuals may make a solemn affirmation instead of swearing a religious oath:

I, [full name], do solemnly, sincerely and truly declare and affirm that I will be faithful and bear true allegiance to His Majesty King Charles, his heirs and successors, according to law.

== Usage ==
The oath or its affirmation is required for:

- Members of Parliament before taking their seats in the House of Commons
- Members of the House of Lords
- Judges and certain court officers
- Members of the British Armed Forces on enlistment
- Police Officers upon acceptance into the service
- Citizenship ceremonies for new British citizens

Local government councillors and elected mayors do not take the oath of allegiance but instead are required to make a declaration of acceptance of office.

== Oaths of office, of allegiance, and judicial oath ==
Promissory Oaths Act 1868 (Note: Section 1.)
- Act of Parliament
- Parliament of the United Kingdom
- Long title: An Act to amend the Law relating to Promissory Oaths.
- Citation: 31 & 32 Vict. c. 72
- Territorial extent: United Kingdom

Dates
- Royal assent: 31 July 1868
- Commencement: 31 July 1868 (Note: The Acts of Parliament (Commencement) Act 1793.)
Other legislation
Amended by	Statute Law Revision Act 1875; Statute Law Revision Act 1893; Statute Law Revision Act 1953; Defence (Transfer of Functions) (No. 1) Order 1964; Statute Law Revision Act 1966; Post Office Act 1969; Sheriff Courts (Scotland) Act 1971; District Courts (Scotland) Act 1975; Statute Law (Repeals) Act 1977; Administration of Justice Act 1977; Statute Law Revision (Northern Ireland) Act 1980; Statute Law (Repeals) Act 1981; Senior Courts Act 1981; Law Reform (Miscellaneous Provisions) (Scotland) Act 1990; Access to Justice Act 1999; Scotland Act 1998 (Consequential Modifications) (No. 1) Order 1999; Justice (Northern Ireland) Act 2002; Constitutional Reform Act 2005; Judiciary and Courts (Scotland) Act 2008; Courts Reform (Scotland) Act 2014
Relates to	Promissory Oaths Act 1871

Status: Amended

Text of statute as originally enacted

Revised text of statute as amended

Text of the Promissory Oaths Act 1868 as in force today (including any amendments) within the United Kingdom, from legislation.gov.uk.

The Victorian promissory oaths of allegiances, are set out in the Promissory Oaths Act 1868 (31 & 32 Vict. c. 72) in the following form:

- The original oath of allegiance as set out in the Promissory Oaths Act 1868:
  I, [Insert full name], do swear that I will be faithful and bear true allegiance to His Majesty King Charles, his heirs and successors, according to law. So help me God.
- The original oath of office as set out in the Promissory Oaths Act 1868:
  I, [Insert full name], do swear that I will well and truly serve His Majesty King Charles in the office of [Insert office of]. So help me God.
- The original judicial oath as set out in the Promissory Oaths Act 1868:
  I, [Insert full name], do swear that I will well and truly serve our Sovereign King Charles in the office of [Insert judicial office of], and I will do right to all manner of people after the laws and usages of this realm, without fear or favour, affection or ill will. So help me God.

== Oaths to heirs and successors ==
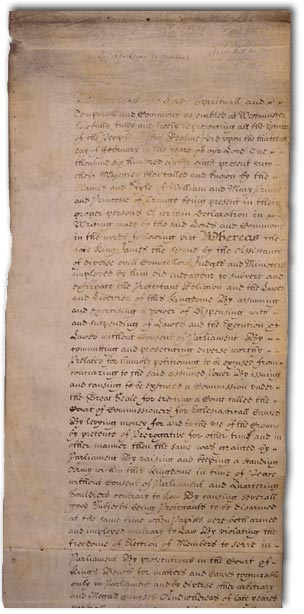
The English Bill of Rights

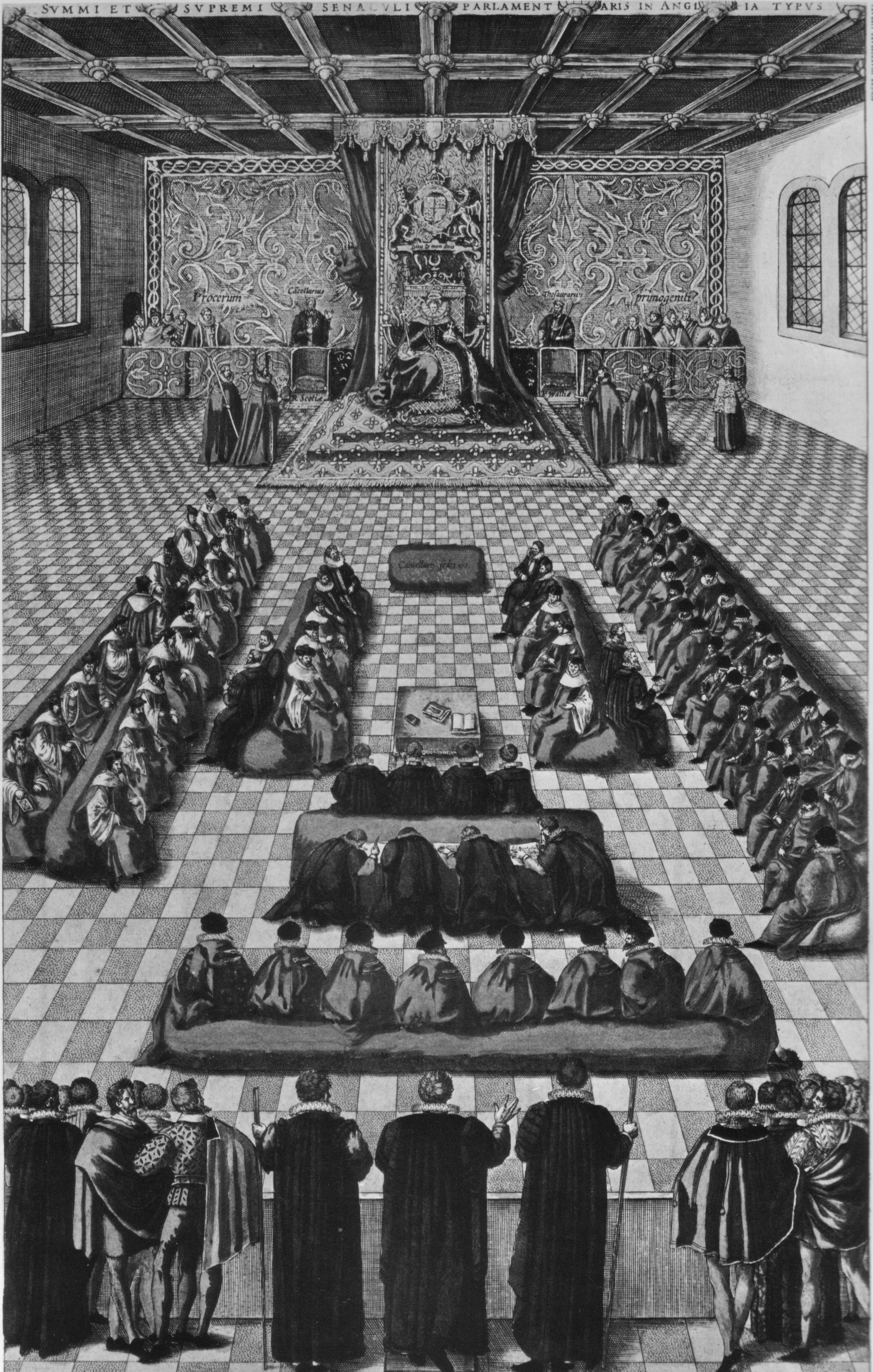
Elizabeth I in Parliament

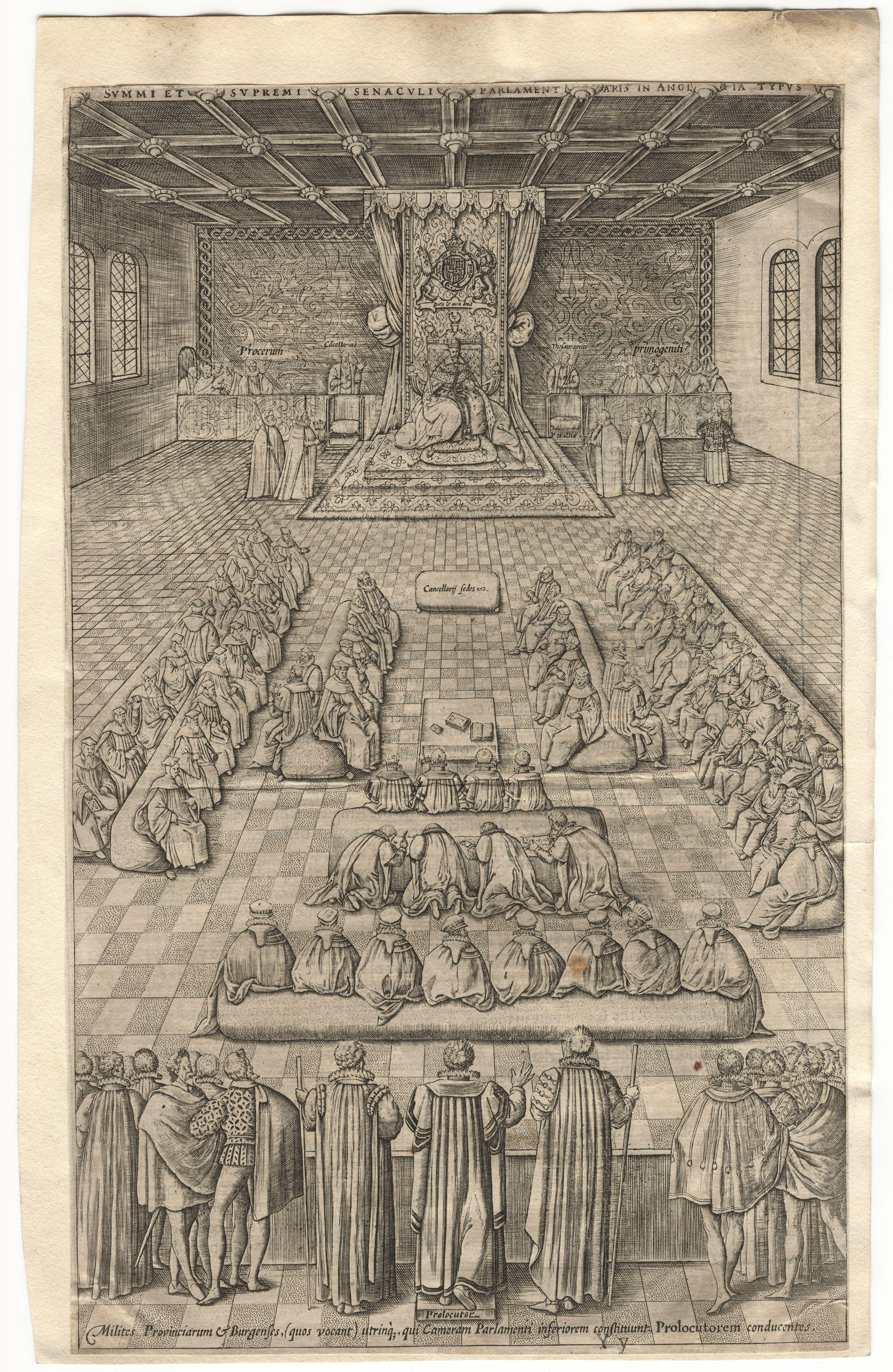
James I and VI in the English Parliament

The oath is generally sworn to the Crown, monarch, sovereign, or regent, as represented by the incumbent king or queen, currently Charles III. The oath also specifies that this same oath to the king, is equally sworn to his "heirs and successors", in the plural, rather than a single heir and successor. This indicates that any oath given to the king is equally given to William, Prince of Wales, Prince George of Wales, and all heirs and successors to the British throne, in the event that any one of them should accede to the throne. Thus, the pledge of loyalty to the Crown made in the oath does not end at the death of the current monarch.

The oath to the king, his heirs and successors is now administered in citizen ceremonies to immigrants becoming naturalized British subjects.

Members of the judiciary (justices of the peace, district judges, circuit judges etc.) swear their allegiance to the king and his heirs and successors; police officers in England and Wales pledge their allegiance to the king, but not his heirs and successors. Members of the Northern Ireland Assembly and the Police Service of Northern Ireland (PSNI) do not swear an oath of allegiance. The PSNI in 2001 replaced the Royal Ulster Constabulary, whose members pledged their allegiance to the late Queen Elizabeth II, but not her heirs and successors. The Scottish police have never pledged allegiance. Members of the Privy Council only swear allegiance to the "King's majesty", not to the king's heirs and successors.

== History ==
=== Origins ===
The oath of allegiance was performed to King Edgar (c. 944–8 July 975).

The oath was certainly in use as of the date of John, King of England's Magna Carta, signed on 15 June 1215. Once the terms had been finalised on 19 June, the rebels again swore allegiance to King John. The later Bill of Rights (1689) included the Oath of Allegiance to the Crown, which was required by Magna Carta to be taken by all crown servants and members of the judiciary.

Over the following centuries this evolved into three separate oaths: of supremacy (repudiation of the spiritual or ecclesiastical authority of any foreign prince, person or prelate), allegiance (declaration of fidelity to the Sovereign), and in 1702, abjuration (repudiation of the right and title of descendants of James II to the throne). Oaths of allegiance were exacted from the Lords by Henry VI in 1455 and 1459, and an oath of supremacy was introduced under Henry VIII in 1534. Elizabeth I introduced an Act of Supremacy in 1563 requiring an oath to be taken by all future members of the House of Commons. A new oath of allegiance appeared under James I (prompted by the "Gunpowder Plot") under the Popish Recusants Act 1605 and the Oath of Allegiance Act 1609. The oath required recognition of James I as lawful King and renunciation of the Pope. The 1609 Act required Commons MPs to take the oath of allegiance and of supremacy, but this was not a "parliamentary" oath, as it was not taken in Parliament, and there were no consequences if not sworn.

=== 1660–1858 ===
After the Restoration, oaths of supremacy and allegiance were imposed upon all MPs and peers in Parliament. The Oaths of Allegiance and Supremacy Act 1688, passed after the Glorious Revolution installed William III and Mary II as monarchs, replaced the old oaths of supremacy and allegiance with shorter ones in almost the modern form. The deposed King James II died in exile in 1701, and King Louis XIV of France and the Jacobite adherents of the Stuart claim proclaimed James II's son, James Francis Edward Stuart, rightful king James III. The Act of Settlement 1701, quickly passed in response, substantially extended the old oaths, while the Security of the Succession, etc. Act 1701 added an oath of abjuration of "the Person [...] pretending to be and taking upon himself the Stile and Title of King of England by the Name of James the Third". This oath pledged support for the Hanoverian succession and for the exclusion of the Stuarts.

=== 19th century ===
The Oaths Act 1858 (21 & 22 Vict. c. 48) prescribed a single form of the oath in place of the former three. This single form retained a declaration of allegiance and a promise to defend the Hanoverian succession. A declaration relating to the supremacy of the sovereign was also included and the oath continued to be made "on the true faith of a Christian". However, both of these latter elements disappeared from the revised version of the single oath that was subsequently prescribed in the Parliamentary Oaths Act 1866, which repealed much of the earlier pieces of legislation insofar as they related to oaths taken by Members of Parliament.

Finally, in the Promissory Oaths Act 1868 a further curtailment to the oath was made, thereby establishing the form of the oath still used today. The direct religious content disappeared along with the declarations relating to the supremacy of the sovereign. In its current form, the oath conforms fairly closely to the medieval (feudal) oath of allegiance.

=== 20th century ===
After the general right to affirm was guaranteed in 1888, the Oaths Act 1909 introduced a change to the ordinary method of taking oaths, which provided for oaths to be sworn on the Bible: in case of a Christian, on the New Testament, and in the case of a Jew on the Old Testament. This Act also established the usual form of taking the oath, with the phrase "I swear by Almighty God that...". Section 1 of the Oaths Act 1888 (on the right to affirm) was replaced in the Administration of Justice Act 1977.

The Oaths Act 1961 extended the Oaths Act 1888, but did not apply to parliamentary oaths. All of the provisions in the Oaths Act 1838, Oaths Act 1888, Oaths Act 1909, Oaths Act 1961 and Oaths Act 1977 were repealed and consolidated in the Oaths Act 1978, although the form of wording of the oath set out in the 1868 act was preserved. The 1978 Oaths Act contains provisions relating to the manner of administering the oath, the option of swearing with uplifted hand, the validity of oaths, the making of solemn affirmations and the form of affirmation. The current Oath of Allegiance or Official Oath is set out in the Promissory Oaths Act 1868.

== Historical oaths ==
=== To James I ===
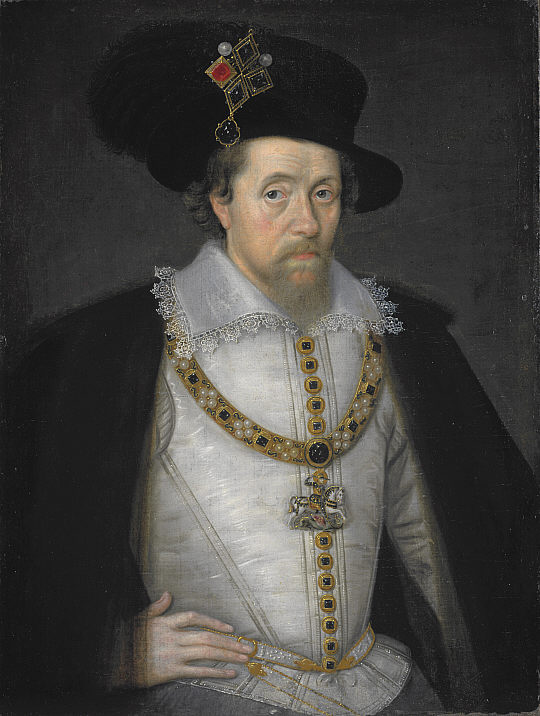
King James I

I, A.B. do truly and sincerely acknowledge, profess, testify, and declare in my conscience before God and the world, that our Sovereign Lord King James, is lawful and rightful King of this realm, and of all other in his Majesties Dominions and Countries; And that the Pope neither of himself, nor by any authorities of the Church or See of Rome, or by any means with any other hath any power or authority to depose the King, or to dispose any of his Majesty's kingdoms, or dominions, or to authorize any foreign prince to invade or annoy him, or his countries, or to discharge any of his Subjects of their allegiance and obedience to his Majesty, or to give any license or leave to any of them to bear arms, raise tumult, or to offer any violence, or hurt to his Majesty's royal person, state, or government, or to any of his Majesty's subjects within his Majesty's dominions. Also, I do swear from my heart that, notwithstanding any declaration or sentence of excommunication or deposition made or granted, or to be made or granted by the Pope or his successors, or by any authority derived, or pretended to be derived from him, or his See against the King, his heirs or successors, or any absolution of the said subjects from their obedience: I will bear faith and true allegiance to his Majesty, his heirs and successors, and him or them will defend to the uttermost of my power, against all conspiracies and attempts whatsoever, which shall be made against his or their persons, their crown and dignity, by reason or color of any such sentence or declaration or otherwise, and will doe my best endeavor to disclose and make known unto his Majesty, his heirs and successors, all treasons and traitorous conspiracies, which I shall know or hear of to be against him or any of them. And I do further swear, that I do from my heart abhor, detest and abjure, as impious and heretical, this damnable doctrine and position, that princes which be excommunicated or deprived by the Pope, may be deposed or murdered by their subjects, or any whatsoever. And I do believe and in conscience am resolved, that neither the Pope nor any person whatsoever, hath power to absolve me of this oath, or any part thereof, which I acknowledge by good and full authority to bee lawfully ministered unto me, and do renounce all pardons and dispensations to the contrary: And all these things I do plainly and sincerely acknowledge and swear, according to these express words by me spoken, and according to the plain and common sense and understanding of the same words, without any Equivocation, or mental evasion, or secret reservation whatsoever: And I doe make this recognition and acknowledgement heartily, willingly, and truly, upon the true faith of a Christian: So help me God.

=== To Charles I ===
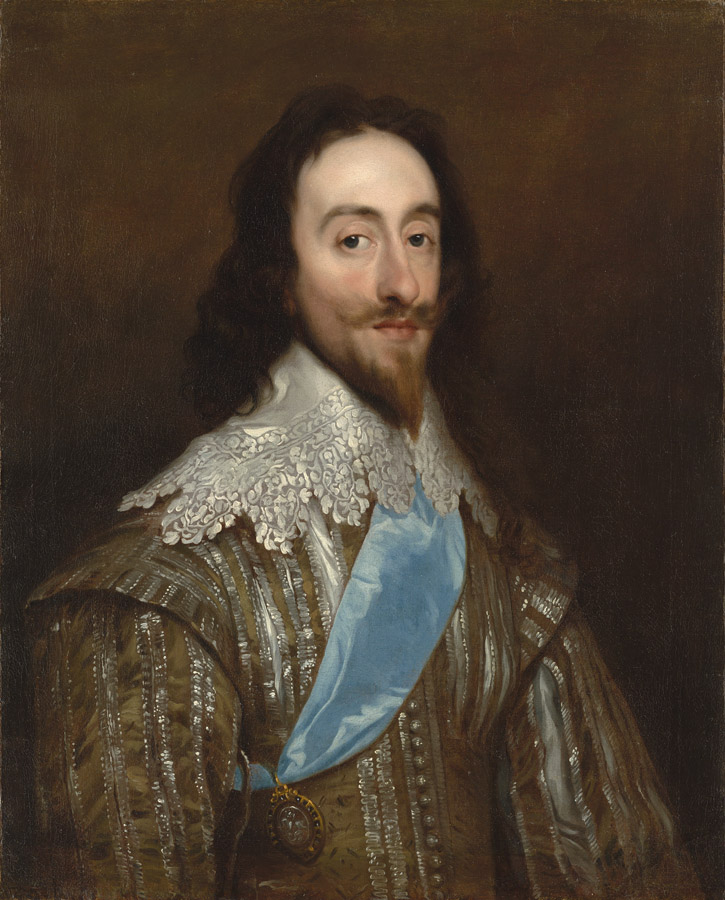
King Charles I

I A. B. doe truly and sincerely acknowledge, professe, testifie and declare in my conscience before God and the world, That our Soveraigne Lord King CHARLES, is lawfull King of this Realme, and of all other His Majesties Dominions and Countreyes: And that the Pope neither of himselfe, nor by any Authority of the Church or See of Rome, or by an other meanes with any other, hath any power or Authority to depose the king, or to dispose of any of his Majesties Kingdomes or Dominions, or to Authorize any Forraigne Prince, to invade or annoy Him or His Countreyes, or to discharge any of his Subjects of their Allegiance and Obedience to His Majestie, or to give Licence or leave to any of them to beare Armes, raise Tumults, or to offer any violence or hurt to His Majesties Royall person, State or Government, or to any of His Majesties Subjects within His Majesties Dominions. Also I doe sweare from my heart, that, notwithstanding any Declaration or Sentence of Excommunication or Deprivation made or granted, or to be made or granted, by the Pope or his Successors, or by any Authority derived, or pretended to be derived from him or his Sea, against the said King, His Heires or Successors, or any Absolution of the said Subjects from their Obedience; I will bear faith and true allegiance to His Majestie, His Heires and Successors, and Him and Them will defend to the uttermost of my power, against all Conspiracies and Attempts whatoever, which shall be made against His or their Persons, their Crowne and Dignitie, by reason or colour of any such Sentence, or Declaration or otherwise, and will doe my best endevour to disclose and make known unto his Majesty, His Heires and Successors, all Treasons and Traitorous Conspiracies which I shall know or heare of to be against Him, or any of them. And l do further sweare, That I do from my heart abhor, detest and abjure as impious and Hereticall this damnable Doctrine and Position, That Princes which be Excommunicated or deprived by the Pope, may be Deposed or Murthered by their Subjects, or any other whatsoever. And I doe beleeve, and in conscience am resolved, that neither the Pope, nor any person whatsoever hath power to absolve me of this Oath, or any part thereof; which I acknowledge by good and full Authority to bee lawfully ministered unto me, and do renounce all Pardons and Dispensations to the contrary. And all these things I doe plainely and sincerely acknowledge and sweare, according to these expresse words by me spoken, and according to the plaine and common sence and understanding of the same words, without any Equivocation, or mentall evasion or secret reservasion whatsoever. And I doe make this Recognition and acknowledgement heartily, willingly, and truly, upon the true Faith of a Christian. So help me GOD.

=== To George IV ===
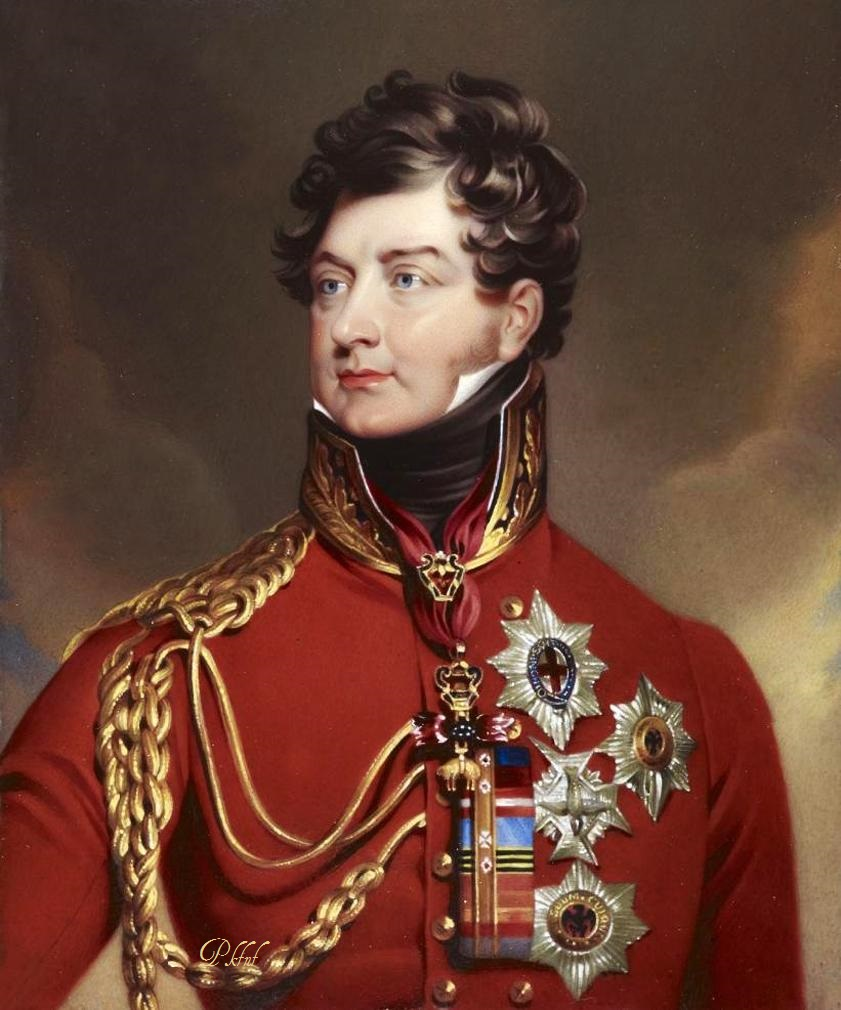
King George IV

I A.B.do sincerely promise and swear, That I will be faithful and bear true Allegiance to His Majesty King George the Fourth, and will defend him to the utmost of my Power against all Conspiracies and Attempts whatever, which shall be made against his Person, Crown or Dignity; and I will do my utmost Endeavour to disclose and make known to His Majesty, His Heirs and Successors, all Treasons and traitorous Conspiracies which may be formed against Him or Them: And I do faithfully promise to maintain, support, and defend, to the utmost of my Power, the Succession of the Crown which Succession, by an Act, intituled An Act for the further Limitation of the Crown, and better securing the Rights and Liberties of the Subject, is and stands limited to the Princess Sophia, Electress of Hanover, and the Heirs of her Body, being Protestants; hereby utterly renouncing and abjuring any Obedience or Allegiance unto any other Person claiming or pretending a Right to the Crown of this Realm: And I do further declare, That it is not an Article of my Faith, and that I do renounce, reject, and abjure the Opinion, that Princes excommunicated or deprived by the Pope, or any other Authority of the See of Rome, may be deposed or murdered by their Subjects, or by any Person whatsoever: And I do declare, That I do not believe that the Pope of Rome, or any other Foreign Prince, Prelate, Person, State, or Potentate, hath or ought to have any Temporal or Civil Jurisdiction, Power, Superiority, or Pre-eminence, directly or indirectly, within this Realm. I do swear, That I will defend to the utmost of my Power the Settlement of Property within this Realm, as established by the Laws: And I do hereby disclaim, disavow, and solemnly abjure any Intention to subvert the present Church Establishment, as settled by Law within this Realm: And I do solemnly swear, That I never will exercise any Privilege to which I am or may become entitled, to disturb or weaken the Protestant Religion or Protestant Government in the United Kingdom: And I do solemnly, in the presence of God, profess, testify, and declare That I do make this Declaration, and every Part thereof, in the plain and ordinary Sense of the Words of this Oath, without any Evasion, Equivocation, or mental Reservation whatsoever. So help me God.

== Office-holders ==
The Oath of Allegiance or Official Oath is made by each of the following office-holders as soon as possible after their acceptance of office:

- First Lord of the Treasury (Held ex officio by the Prime Minister)
- Second Lord of the Treasury (Held ex officio by the Chancellor of the Exchequer)
- Lord Chancellor
- Lord President of the Council
- Lord Privy Seal
- Secretaries of State
- President of the Board of Trade
- Lord Steward
- Lord Chamberlain
- Earl Marshal
- Master of the Horse
- Chancellor of the Duchy of Lancaster
- Paymaster General
- Keeper of the Great Seal of Scotland (since 1999 held ex officio by the First Minister of Scotland)
- Keeper of the Privy Seal of Scotland
- Lord Clerk Register
- Advocate General for Scotland
- Lord Justice Clerk
- First Minister of Wales (since the Government of Wales Act 2006 came into force in May 2007)

The Oath in England is tendered by the Clerk of the Privy Council, and taken in the presence of the King in Council, or otherwise as the King shall direct, and in Scotland is tendered by the Lord President of the Court of Session at a sitting of the court.

== Privy counsellor oath ==
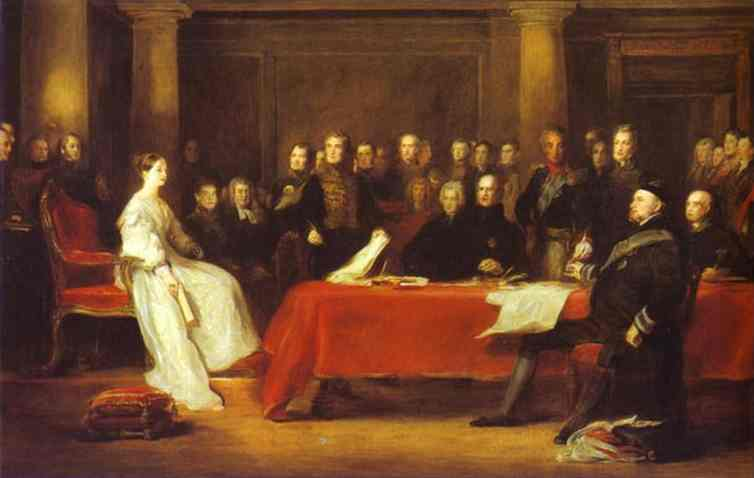
Queen Victoria holding a Privy Council meeting. by D. Wilke. 1838.

On appointment a new privy counsellor takes the oath of allegiance, or affirms loyalty:

You do swear by Almighty God to be a true and faithful Servant unto The King’s Majesty as one of His Majesty's Privy Council. You will not know or understand of any manner of thing to be attempted, done or spoken against His Majesty's Person, Honour, Crown or Dignity Royal, but you will let and withstand the same to the uttermost of your power, and either cause it to be revealed to His Majesty Himself, or to such of His Privy Council as shall advertise His Majesty of the same. You will in all things to be moved, treated and debated in Conscience; and will keep secret all matters committed and revealed unto you, or that shall be treated of secretly in Council. And if any of the said Treaties or Counsels shall touch any of the Counsellors you will not reveal it unto him but will keep the same until such time as, by the consent of His Majesty or of the Council, Publication shall be made thereof. You will to your uttermost bear Faith and Allegiance to the King’s Majesty; and will assist and defend all civil and temporal Jurisdictions, Pre-eminences, and Authorities, granted to His Majesty and annexed to the Crown by Acts of Parliament, or otherwise, against all Foreign Princes, Persons, Prelates, States, or Potentates. And generally in all things you will do as a faithful and true Servant ought to do to His Majesty. So help you God.

== Parliamentarians ==
Under the Parliamentary Oaths Act 1866, members of both Houses of Parliament are required to take an Oath of Allegiance upon taking their seat in Parliament, after a general election, or by-election, and after the death of the monarch. Until the oath or affirmation is taken, an MP may not receive a salary, take their seat, speak in debates or vote. The wording of the oath comes from the Promissory Oaths Act 1868:

I... swear by Almighty God that I will be faithful and bear true allegiance to His Majesty King Charles, his heirs and successors, according to law. So help me God.

Members who object to swearing the oath are permitted to make a solemn affirmation under the terms of the Oaths Act 1978:

I... do solemnly, sincerely and truly declare and affirm that I will be faithful and bear true allegiance to His Majesty King Charles, his heirs and successors, according to law.

The oath or affirmation must be taken in English although the Speaker has allowed Members to recite Welsh, Scottish Gaelic, Irish, Scots, Ulster Scots or Cornish forms in addition, and texts of the oath and affirmation in Braille are available for use by Members of both Houses with impaired sight. While the oath is taken, the new member holds a copy of a sacred text. While there is no set list of sacred texts for use, this is normally a copy of the New Testament or Bible for Christians, or, for Jews, the Tanakh. Muslims or Sikhs have been sworn in the usual manner except with the Qur'an (in an envelope, to avoid it being touched by one not of the faith) and Guru Granth Sahib respectively. Religious restrictions in the oath effectively barred individuals of certain faiths (e.g., Roman Catholics, Jews and Quakers) from entering Parliament for many years. The restrictions were lifted by the Oaths Act 1888 after the six-year effort (1880–1886) of noted atheist Charles Bradlaugh to claim his seat.

=== A new parliament and the Demise of the Crown ===
After a general election, the new parliament is opened by the Royal Commission in the House of Lords, in the presence of Members of both Houses, after which the House of Commons meets to elect a Speaker and the Lords commences oath taking.

Following the Demise of the Crown (the death or abdication of the current monarch), all Members of Parliament and members of the House of Lords have the opportunity (though this is not a formal requirement) to take an oath of allegiance to the new Sovereign at the first meeting of Parliament under a new monarch. The House votes an Address to the Crown in response to the official notification of the previous monarch's demise, expressing condolences upon the death of the previous monarch and pledging loyalty to their successor.

After the death of Elizabeth II, members of both houses of Parliament met the following day to pay tribute. Senior members of Parliament took the oath to King Charles III on Saturday 10 September. Other members of Parliament were offered the opportunity to take the oath to the new sovereign but it was confirmed that this was not a formal requirement.

=== Order of seniority ===
At the start of a new Parliament, after the Commons Speaker has taken the oath, MPs come forward one by one to swear or affirm at the despatch-box, in order of seniority:

1. Father of the House (longest continuously serving member)
2. Cabinet ministers
3. Shadow cabinet ministers
4. Privy counsellors
5. Other ministers
6. Other members by seniority

If two or more MPs enter the house at the same election their seniority is determined by the date and/or time they took the oath.

=== Taking the oath in the House of Commons ===
The Principal Clerk of the Table Office at the despatch box offers a choice of affirmation or oath cards to read. The MP takes the oath or affirms, then moves along the Table to the Clerk Assistant and signs the Test Roll, a parchment book headed by the oath and affirmation which is kept by the Clerk of the House of Commons.

=== State Opening ===
After the initial swearing in process, most MPs and Members of the House of Lords are able to sit and vote in each House. Any remaining MPs or Members of the Lords can take the oath at later sittings. When the majority of MPs and Members of the Lords have been sworn in, both Houses of Parliament are ready to hear the King's Speech at the State Opening starting the business of the session.

=== By-elections and MPs ===
MPs who have been elected at a by-election are accompanied from the bar of the House by two sponsors. The new Member will have collected a certificate relating to their election from the Public Bill Office to hand to the Clerk of the House before taking the oath or making the affirmation.

=== Scottish Parliament ===
Section 84 of the Scotland Act 1998 requires Members of the Scottish Parliament to take the Oath of Allegiance at a meeting of the Parliament. Members of the Scottish Government and junior Scottish Ministers are additionally required to take the Official Oath.

=== Senedd Cymru – Welsh Parliament oath ===
Section 23 of the Government of Wales Act 2006 requires members of the Senedd to take the oath of allegiance. A Welsh form of the Oath is prescribed by the National Assembly for Wales (Oath of Allegiance in Welsh) Order 1999:

The Welsh wording is:

Yr wyf i, yn addo trwy gymorth y Goruchaf y byddaf yn ffyddlon ac yn wir deyrngar i'w Fawrhydi y Brenin Siarl, ei etifeddion a'i olynwyr, yn ôl y gyfraith, yn wyneb Duw.

The corresponding affirmation is:

Yr wyf i, yn datgan ac yn cadarnhau yn ddifrifol, yn ddiffuant ac yn ddidwyll y byddaf yn ffyddlon ac yn wir deyrngar i'w Fawrhydi y Brenin Siarl, ei etifeddion a'i olynwyr, yn ôl y gyfraith.

=== Scottish Gaelic oath ===
The Scottish Gaelic wording is:

Tha mi a' mionnachadh air Dia uilechumhachdach gum bi mi dìleas agus daingeann d'a Mhòrachd, An Rìgh Teàrlach, a Oighrean agus ladsan a thig na Àite, a rèir an Lagha. Dia gam chuideachadh.

=== Cornish oath ===
The Cornish wording is:

My a de re Dhuw Ollgallosek dell vedhav len ha perthi Omrians gwir dhe Y VRASTER AN MYGHTERN CHARLES, Hy Heryon ha Sewyoryon, herwydh an Lagha. Duw re'm gweresso.

=== Refusing to take the oath ===
Those elected to the House of Commons, to the Scottish Parliament, or to the Senedd who refuse to take the oath or affirmation are barred from participating in any proceedings, and from receiving their salaries. Members of the House of Commons could also be fined £500, and have their seat declared vacant "as if [they] were dead", if they attempt to do so. The most recent example of an MP losing their seat in this way was John Jacob Astor, who voted in a division on 4 March 1924 even though he had not taken the oath following his most recent election in the general election on 6 December 1923. Astor's seat was declared vacant on 6 March, but no other candidate stood in the 1924 Dover by-election and so he was returned unopposed on 12 March. Astor took the oath the next day.

Under the Parliamentary Oaths Act 1866, any peer voting, or sitting in the House of Lords without having taken the oath, is subject, for every such offence, to a penalty of £500. Members of the Scottish Parliament must take the oath within two months of being elected, failing which they cease to be members and their seat is vacated.

On 1 April 1998, the House of Lords Information Office published a list of 260 peers who had not made the oath of allegiance as members of that House and were therefore not allowed to sit, speak or vote in the Lords. These were listed as 35 Conservatives; 4 Labour; 2 Liberal Democrats; 46 crossbenchers; and 173 of undeclared political alliances. By rank, these were listed as 3 Royal Dukes (the Duke of Edinburgh, the Prince of Wales - now King Charles III- and the Duke of York); 12 other Dukes; 16 Marquesses; 48 Earls; 32 Viscounts; 3 Countesses; and 152 baron(esse)s. Following the later reform of the House of Lords, these are no longer listed as members of the House of Lords.

== Northern Ireland Assembly ==
Although an oath of allegiance is required of members of the Scottish Parliament and the Senedd, there is no requirement for members of the Northern Ireland Assembly to take an oath of allegiance, or any other oath, nor is there any form of voluntary oath prescribed for those who may wish to swear one. However, members are required to sign the Assembly's roll of membership, designate their identity as "Nationalist", "Unionist" or "Other", and take a Pledge of Office. Ministers can be removed from office if the responsibilities of the pledge are not met. Members pledge:

1. to discharge in good faith all the duties of office;
2. commitment to non-violence and exclusively peaceful and democratic means;
3. to serve all the people of Northern Ireland equally, and to act in accordance with the general obligations on government to promote equality and prevent discrimination;
  1. to promote the interests of the whole community represented in the Northern Ireland Assembly towards the goal of a shared future;
  2. to participate fully in the Executive Committee, the North-South Ministerial Council and the British-Irish Council;
  3. to observe the joint nature of the offices of First Minister and deputy First Minister;
  4. to uphold the rule of law based as it is on the fundamental principles of fairness, impartiality and democratic accountability, including support for policing and the courts;
4. to participate with colleagues in the preparation of a programme for government;
5. to operate within the framework of that programme when agreed within the Executive Committee and endorsed by the Assembly;
6. to support, and to act in accordance with, all decisions of the Executive Committee and Assembly;
7. to comply with the Ministerial Code of Conduct.

== Judges and magistrates (England and Wales) ==
Judges and magistrates on being sworn in, are required by various statutes to take two oaths: the oath of allegiance and the judicial oath, (collectively; the judicial oath). Judges of Hindu, Jewish, Muslim and Sikh religions can omit the words "I swear by Almighty God" and replace it with an acceptable alternative.

The wording of the judges' first Oath of Allegiance is:

I... do swear by Almighty God that I will be faithful and bear true allegiance to His Majesty King Charles the third, his heirs and successors, according to law. So help me God.

The wording of the judges' second Judicial Oath is:

I... do swear by Almighty God that I will well and truly serve our Sovereign Lord King Charles the third in the office of..., and I will do right to all manner of people after the laws and usages of this realm, without fear or favour, affection or ill will. So help me God.

The wording of the magistrates' first Oath of Allegiance is:

I... swear that I will well and truly serve our Sovereign Lord King Charles the third, in the office of Justice of the Peace and I will do right to all manner of people after the laws and usages of the Realm without fear or favour, affection or ill will.

On 1 November 2010, in an official ceremony at Swansea's magistrates' court in Wales, ten trainee magistrates were the first magistrates in the United Kingdom to swear their oath of allegiance to the Queen "and her heirs".

The wording of the magistrates' second Judicial Oath is:

I... do swear that I will well and faithfully serve in the office of... and that I will do right to all manner of people without fear or favour, affection or ill-will according to the laws and usages of this realm.

Judicial oaths are enshrined in a number of statutes:

- The Lord Chief Justice, Master of the Rolls, President of the Queen's Bench Division, President of the Family Division and the Chancellor of the High Court – s.10 Supreme Court Act 1981
- Puisne Judges of the High Court – s.10(4) Supreme Court Act 1981
- Circuit Judges and Recorders – s.22 Courts Act 1971
- Recorder of London – Promissory Oaths Act 1868 Schedule Pt II
- District Judges – s.76(1)(a) of the Courts and Legal Services Act 1990
- Justices of the Peace – Promissory Oaths Act 1868 Schedule Pt II

== Notaries public (England and Wales) ==
A notary public seeking admission to the roll in England and Wales must swear the Oath of Allegiance and the Oath of Office, which is prescribed by s. 7 Public Notaries Act 1843.

== Police officers ==
=== England and Wales ===
Prior to September 2002:

I... of... do solemnly and sincerely declare and affirm that I will well and truly serve Our Sovereign Lady the Queen in the office of constable, without favour or affection, malice or ill will; and that I will to the best of my power cause the peace to be kept and preserved, and prevent all offences against the persons and properties of Her Majesty's subjects; and that while I continue to hold the said office I will to the best of my skill and knowledge discharge all the duties thereof faithfully according to law.

Between September 2002 and 8 September 2022:

I... of... do solemnly and sincerely declare and affirm that I will well and truly serve the Queen in the office of constable, with fairness, integrity, diligence and impartiality, upholding fundamental human rights and according equal respect to all people; and that I will, to the best of my power, cause the peace to be kept and preserved and prevent all offences against people and property; and that while I continue to hold the said office I will, to the best of my skill and knowledge, discharge all the duties thereof faithfully according to law.

Since 8 September 2022:

I... of... do solemnly and sincerely declare and affirm that I will well and truly serve the King in the office of constable, with fairness, integrity, diligence and impartiality, upholding fundamental human rights and according equal respect to all people; and that I will, to the best of my power, cause the peace to be kept and preserved and prevent all offences against people and property; and that while I continue to hold the said office I will, to the best of my skill and knowledge, discharge all the duties thereof faithfully according to law.

=== Scotland ===
Police in Scotland do not swear an oath of allegiance. Prior to the 1 April 2013 the following declaration was made:

I hereby do solemnly and sincerely and truly declare and affirm that I will faithfully discharge the duties of the office of constable.

The Police and Fire Reform (Scotland) Act 2012 replaced the previous declaration with the following:

I do solemnly, sincerely and truly declare and affirm that I will faithfully discharge the duties of the office of constable with fairness, integrity, diligence and impartiality, and that I will uphold fundamental human rights and accord equal respect to all people, according to law.

=== Northern Ireland ===
Northern Ireland police do not swear an oath to the monarch.

Until September 2001:

I... swear by Almighty God that I will well and truly serve our Sovereign Lady the Queen in the office of (rank) without favour of affection, malice or ill-will; that I will to the best of my power cause the peace to be kept and preserved and that I will prevent to the best of my power all offences against the same; and that, while I shall continue to hold the said office, I will faithfully, according to law, to the best of my skill and knowledge, discharge all the duties of the said office and all such duties as may be attached to said office by law and that I do not now belong to and that I will not, while I shall hold the said office, belong to any association, society, or confederacy formed for or engaged in any seditious purpose, or any purpose tending to disturb the public peace, or in any way disloyal to our Sovereign Lady the Queen and that I will not, while I shall hold the said office, engage or take part in the furthering of any such purpose, or take or administer, or assist or be present at or consent to the administering of, any oath or engagement binding myself or any other person to engage in any such purpose.

From November 2001:

I... hereby do solemnly and sincerely and truly declare and affirm that I will faithfully discharge the duties of the office of constable, with fairness, integrity, diligence and impartiality, upholding fundamental human rights and according equal respect to all individuals and their traditions and beliefs; that while I continue to hold the said office I will to the best of my skill and knowledge discharge all the duties thereof according to law.

== Clergy ==
Any person being ordained as a priest or deacon of the Church of England, or taking up any "perpetual curacy, lectureship, or preachership", is required by the Clerical Subscription Act 1865 to take an Oath of Allegiance and Supremacy. This is now, by the Promissory Oaths Act 1868, the same as the usual Oath of Allegiance. Canon C13 now requires the oath of allegiance to be made by anyone appointed archbishop or bishop, priest or deacon, or to be licensed or admitted to any office in the Church of England.

== Armed forces ==
All persons joining or commissioning in the British Armed Forces, except Royal Navy Officers, are required to attest to the following oath or equivalent affirmation, with the date of attestation treated as the commencement of service even if not reporting for training until a later date:

I swear by Almighty God [or: do solemnly, and truly declare and affirm] that I will be faithful and bear true allegiance to His Majesty King Charles III, His Heirs and Successors, and that I will, as in duty bound, honestly and faithfully defend His Majesty, His Heirs and Successors, in Person, Crown and Dignity against all enemies, and will observe and obey all orders of His Majesty, His Heirs and Successors, and of the [admirals/generals/air officers] and officers set over me.

No oath of allegiance was previously sworn by ratings in the Royal Navy. This ceased to be the case under regulations passed following the passage of the Armed Forces Act 2006. Officers in the Navy were historically required to swear the oaths of allegiance, supremacy and abjuration under the various Test Acts but currently do not do so.

== Citizenship ceremonies ==
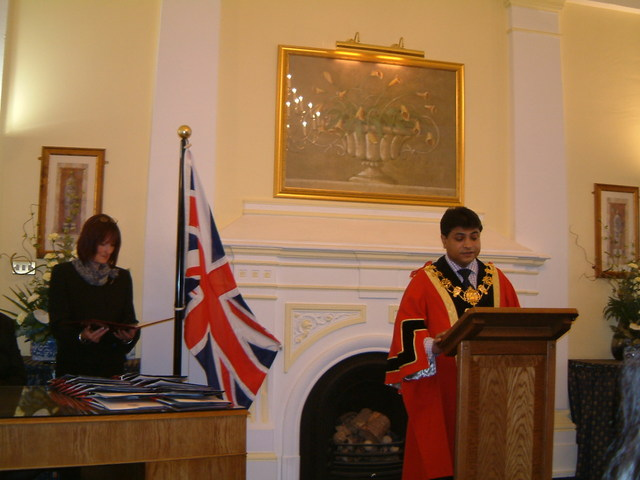
British Citizenship ceremony

The Oath of Allegiance, with the addition of the words "on becoming a British citizen" (or other type of British national, as appropriate), is also used at citizenship ceremonies, where persons being registered or naturalised in the United Kingdom are required to swear or affirm their allegiance to the King, his heirs and successors, and additionally make a pledge to follow the laws of the country and uphold its democratic values. The applicants are then presented with their certificate of citizenship.

Citizenship Oath of Allegiance:

I... swear by Almighty God that, on becoming a British citizen, I will be faithful and bear true allegiance to His Majesty King Charles the Third, His Heirs and Successors according to law.

Citizenship Pledge:

I will give my loyalty to the United Kingdom and respect its rights and freedoms. I will uphold its democratic values. I will observe its laws faithfully and fulfil my duties and obligations as a British citizen.

== Scouts and Girl Guides ==
The principle of swearing an oath, or form of promise, is well exemplified in the constitution of the World Organization of the Scout Movement (WOSM), Article II, paragraph 2: "Adherence to a promise and law," the principles of Duty to God, Duty to others and Duty to self. The Scout Promise; On my honour I promise that I will do my best—To do my duty to God and the King (or to God and my Country) [...] This is in line with the majority of international Scout oaths to "God and my Country." In order to accommodate many different religions within Scouting, "God" may refer to a higher power, and is not specifically restricted to the God of the monotheistic religions. WOSM explains "Duty to God" as "Adherence to spiritual principles, loyalty to the religion that expresses them, and acceptance of the duties resulting therefrom." Wording variations are allowed in order to accommodate different religious obligations and national allegiances.

UK Scout Association (age 10+ and adults):

On my honour, I promise that I will do my best, to do my duty to God and to the King, to help other people and to keep the Scout Law.

Scout Promise in Welsh (Addewid y Sgowtiaid):

Ar fy llw, Addawf i wneud fy ngorau, i wneud fy nyletswydd i Dduw ac i'r Brenin, i helpu pobl eraill, ac i gadw Cyfraith y Sgowtiaid.

(UK SA) Beaver Scouts (age 6 to 8):

I promise to do my best to be kind and helpful and to love God.

(UK SA) Cub Scouts (age 8 to 10):

I promise that I will do my best to do my duty to God and to the King, to help other people, and to keep the Cub Scout Law.

Girlguiding UK Brownies, Guides, leaders :

I promise that I will do my best: To be true to myself and develop my beliefs, To serve the King and my community, To help other people, and To keep the (Brownie) Guide Law.

Rainbows (aged 4–7 years):

I promise that I will do my best to think about my beliefs and to be kind and helpful.

Baden-Powell Scouts' Association (age 11+):

On My Honour, I promise that I will do my best, To do my Duty to God and to the King, To help other people at all times, And obey the Scout Law.

(BPSA) Beaver Scouts (5 to 8 years):

I promise to do my best, To obey my Leaders and parents. And to be a good Beaver.

(BPSA) Wolf Cubs (8 to 11 years):

I promise to do my best. To do my duty to God, and to the King, To keep the Law of the Wolf Cub Pack, and to do a good turn to somebody every day.

== MOD Sponsored Cadet Forces ==
While not being a part of the Armed Forces, MOD sponsored Cadet forces, which are voluntary youth organisations (for ages 12–18) and consist of the Army Cadet Force, Sea Cadets, Air Training Corps and the Combined Cadet Force, often take a promise of allegiance. This is not a formal attestation, but rather a pledge to follow the values of the Cadet Force.

Army Cadet Force Promise:

I promise to serve my King and Country loyally and honourably. I will uphold the values of the Army Cadet Force and will respect my fellow Cadets of [Name of Unit] ACF, to which I now belong.

Sea Cadets Promise:

I promise to serve my God, my King, my country, and, the Sea Cadet Corps and to obey the orders of my superior officers. I will be proud of my uniform and be smart and seamanlike in wearing it, and, always do my duty.

Air Training Corps Promise:

I, solemnly promise on my honour to serve my Unit loyally and to be faithful to my obligations as a member of the Air Training Corps. I further promise to be a good citizen and to do my duty to (God and) the King, my Country and my Flag.

== Opposition to the oath ==
=== Proposed amendments to oath ===
There have been several private members' bills in recent years concerning the parliamentary oath. None have been successful. The following have occurred since the passing of the Oaths Act 1978:

==== Democratic Oaths Bill 1987-88137 (Tony Benn) ====
21 July 1988 Presentation and first reading

I, A B, Do swear by Almighty God Or Solemnly declare and affirm That I will be faithful and bear true allegiance to the peoples of the United Kingdom, according to their respective laws and customs; preserving inviolably their civil liberties and democratic rights of self government, through their elected representatives in the House of Commons, and will faithfully and truly declare my mind and opinion on all matters that come before me without fear or favour.

==== Parliamentary Declaration Bill 1997-98138 (Tony Benn) ====
13 January 1998 Presentation and First Reading:

I do solemnly Declare and Affirm that I will, to the best of my ability, discharge the responsibilities required of me by virtue of my membership of the House of Commons and faithfully serve those whom I represent here.

==== Parliamentary Oaths (Amendment) proposed Bill 1997-98139 (Kevin McNamara) ====
29 July 1998 Motion for leave to introduce a Bill. Negatived on division (137 to 151):

Motion: That leave be given to bring in a Bill to enable a person lawfully elected to the House of Commons to take his seat without swearing the present oath or affirming; and for connected purposes.

==== Parliamentary Oath (Amendment) proposed bill 1999-2000140 (Kevin McNamara) ====
14 November 2000 Motion for leave to introduce a Bill. Negatived on Division (129 to 148):

Motion: That leave be given to bring in a Bill to amend the parliamentary oath; and for connected purposes.

A Motion to introduce a bill entitled "Treason Felony, Act of Settlement and Parliamentary Oath Bill" was moved by Kevin McNamara on 19 December 2001. It did not progress further than its first reading.

=== Republican parliamentarians ===
Republicans have expressed opposition to a compulsory oath made to an unelected monarch.

- Tony Benn in 1992 stated, when he took the oath, "As a dedicated republican, I solemnly swear ...". After the 1997 election, "As a committed republican, under protest, I take the oath required of me by law, under the Parliamentary Oaths Act of 1866, to allow me to represent my constituency ..." Later, he stated, "When one looks at the oaths of a Privy Counsellor, a Member of Parliament and the Sovereign at the coronation, they throw an interesting light on the obligations by which we are bound. The reality is that nobody takes an oath to uphold democracy in Britain. The Queen takes an oath to govern the country and uphold the rights of the bishops. We take an oath to the Queen. Nobody in the House takes an oath to uphold democracy in Britain." Tony Benn's Commonwealth of Britain Bill proposed that MPs and other officials swear oaths to a Constitution rather than the Crown.
- Kevin McNamara stated: "The era in which it was thought to be appropriate for legislators to set a political or religious test for those deemed acceptable to enter the parliamentary club has long since passed. [...] The only test for inclusion and membership of this House should be the will of the electorate, freely expressed."
- Dennis Skinner stated, "I solemnly swear that I will bear true and faithful allegiance to the Queen when she pays her income tax". He is also alleged to have added "and all who sail in her" to the oath, implying he was referring to HMS Queen Elizabeth rather than the monarch herself.
- Tony Banks was seen with his fingers crossed when he took the oath in 1997.
- Richard Burgon in 2015 prefaced his oath by expressing his support for constitutional change for an elected head of state: "As someone that believes that the head of state should be elected I make this oath in order to serve my constituents".
- Colum Eastwood of the Irish nationalist Social Democratic and Labour Party stated in 2019, "Under protest and in order to represent my constituency, I do solemnly [...] My true allegiance is to the people of Derry and the people of Ireland."
- Also in 2019, SNP member Steven Bonnar visibly crossed his fingers during the affirmation. He also added to the official text "I take this oath to ensure that I can represent the people of Coatbridge, Chryston and Bellshill in Scotland". Some other SNP members also added similar statements to the oath's wording.
- In 2024, Labour member Clive Lewis prefaced his oath by "I take this oath under protest and in the hope that one day my fellow citizens will democratically decide to live in a republic until that time..."

=== Parliamentary ===
According to "The Parliamentary Oath" even if the entire country were to vote in a general election for a party whose manifesto pledge was to remove the monarchy, it would be impossible by reason of the present oath, and current acts of Parliament, for such elected MPs to take their seats in the House of Commons, or be raised to the House of Lords, without taking the Oath of Allegiance to the ruling monarch, and to his heirs, and successors. However, there would be nothing to prevent a parliamentary majority debating a republic or from seeking to renegotiate the constitutional settlement since freedom of speech is guaranteed by article 9 of the Bill of Rights 1689.

The requirement to take the oath/affirmation is also enshrined in the Code of Conduct for MPs. Should an MP take part in parliamentary proceedings, without having sworn the oath, or affirmation, the penalty is £500 for every offence, together with vacation of their seat. Before 1997, MPs who did not take the oath, whilst unable to receive their salary, were entitled to the other facilities of the House. After the 1997 general election, the Speaker, Betty Boothroyd, made a new ruling on entitlement to salary, allowances and services as they relate to Members who have not taken the oath. This removed the right of any such MPs to the services of the House. Following the 2001 general election, and the election of four Sinn Féin members, the following Speaker, Michael Martin, re-iterated his predecessor's comments.

An Early Day Motion to change the Oath of Allegiance was brought before the House of Commons by 25 Members of Parliament, (Note: The signatories of the early day motion were: N Baker (Liberal Democrat; Lewes), J Austin (Labour: Erith & Thamesmead), P Bottomley (Conservative: Worthing W), K Buck (Labour: Regent's Park & Kensington N), R Campbell (Labour: Blyth Valley), M Caton (Labour: Gower), M Clapham (Labour: Barnsley W & Penistone), I Davidson (Labour: Glasgow SW), J Dowd (Labour: Lewisham W), L Featherstone (Liberal Democrat: Hornsey & Wood Green), P Flynn (Labour: Newport West), A George (Liberal Democrat: St. Ives), J Goldsworthy (Liberal Democrat: Falmouth & Camborne), J Hemming (Liberal Democrat: Birmingham Yardley), M Horwood (Liberal Democrat: Cheltenham), S Hughes (Liberal Democrat: N Southwark & Bermondsey), B Iddon (Labour: Bolton SE), B Jenkins (Labour: Tamworth), L Jones (Labour: Birmingham Selly Oak), C McCafferty (Labour: Calder Valley), A McDonnell (SD&L: Belfast S), M Oaten (Liberal Democrat: Winchester), K Purchase (Labour: Wolverhampton NE), A Simpson (Labour: Nottingham S) and J Swinson (Liberal Democrat: E Dunbartonshire).) on 12 June 2008. Early Day Motion (#1780) read as follows:

That this House recognises that the principal duty of hon. Members is to represent their constituents in Parliament; also recognises that some hon. Members would prefer to swear an oath of allegiance to their constituents and the nation rather than the Monarch; and therefore calls on the Leader of the House to bring forward legislative proposals to introduce an optional alternative Parliamentary oath allowing hon. Members to swear allegiance to their constituents and the nation and to pledge to uphold the law rather than one pledging personal allegiance to the serving Monarch.

=== Scottish Parliament ===
Alex Salmond of the Scottish National Party, as the first party leader to be sworn into the Scottish Parliament in 2011, before raising his right hand to swear allegiance to the Queen, the SNP leader said: "The Scottish National Party's primary loyalty is to the people of Scotland, in line with the Scottish constitutional tradition of the sovereignty of the people."

The Scottish Socialist Party, who advocate the abolition of the monarchy have made a number of protests during their Oaths of Allegiance in the Scottish Parliament. Their former leader Tommy Sheridan swore an oath of allegiance to the Queen with a clenched fist in 1999, Rosie Kane held her own protest during the oath ceremony, during which she swore allegiance with the words "My oath is to the people" written on her raised hand, Colin Fox sang Robert Burns' "A Man's A Man for A' That" at his protest, before being moved to the end of the queue by presiding officer Sir David Steel.

=== Pressure groups ===
Campaign group Republic also challenges the oath of allegiance. Represented by human rights lawyer Louise Christian, their campaign is seeking to change the law so that both MPs and others required to take the oath can swear allegiance to the country and people, rather than the monarchy: "It is vital we challenge offensive and discriminatory oaths of allegiance – if our elected MPs ignore our calls we'll take this issue to court."

=== Sinn Féin ===
The Irish republican party Sinn Féin follows a policy of abstaining from the House of Commons; this is because its members refuse to recognise the legitimacy of the British Parliament as a body that legislates for Northern Ireland. The party also rejects the sovereignty of the British Crown in Northern Ireland, and as a result, even if its members wished to take up their seats, they would likely refuse to take the oath, and thereby would forfeit their seats and become liable to a fine of £500, recoverable by action in the High Court of Justice. As absentees, Sinn Féin MPs are denied their salaries, worth around £1.5 million over the five years to 2009, but may claim staff costs and additional accommodation allowances.

It is unknown whether Sinn Féin MPs would reconsider their policy of abstentionism if the oath were abolished, or if a new oath or pledge were adopted without any mention of the monarch or the Crown. From 1922 a similar situation pertained with respect to the Irish Free State Oireachtas (parliament), which Sinn Féin boycotted because it did not recognise the state. Fianna Fáil split from Sinn Féin in 1926 by proposing to enter the Oireachtas if it could do so without taking the Oireachtas oath of allegiance to George V. Although the oath was abolished in 1933, Sinn Féin continued to boycott each Oireachtas until 1986.

In 1999 the Sinn Féin member of parliament Martin McGuinness challenged the legitimacy of the Oath of Allegiance required of British MPs by taking the matter to the European Court of Human Rights. The application was deemed inadmissible on the basis that the requirement of an oath to the reigning monarch was "reasonably viewed as an affirmation of loyalty to the constitutional principles which support [...] the workings of representative democracy in the respondent State".

== See also ==
- Irish Civil War
- Oath of allegiance (worldwide concept)
