= Oaths Act 1978 =

Act of the Parliament of the United Kingdom

Oaths Act 1978 (Note: Section 8(1).)
- Act of Parliament
- Parliament of the United Kingdom
- Long title: An Act to consolidate the Oaths Act 1838 and the Oaths Acts 1888 to 1977, and to repeal, as obsolete, section 13 of the Circuit Courts (Scotland) Act 1828.
- Citation: 1978 c. 19
- Territorial extent: England and Wales; Northern Ireland; Scotland (Part II only); (Note: Section 8(2)–(3).)

Dates
- Royal assent: 30 June 1978
- Commencement: 30 July 1978 (Note: Section 8(5).)
Other legislation
Amends	Circuit Courts (Scotland) Act 1828; Children and Young Persons Act 1963; Children and Young Persons Act (Northern Ireland) 1968; See § Repealed enactments
Repeals/revokes	See § Repealed enactments
Amended by	Children (Northern Ireland) Order 1995; Criminal Justice (Children) (Northern Ireland) Order 1998; Armed Forces Act 2006; Victims, Witnesses, and Justice Reform (Scotland) Act 2025

Status: Amended

Text of statute as originally enacted

Revised text of statute as amended

Text of the Oaths Act 1978 as in force today (including any amendments) within the United Kingdom, from legislation.gov.uk.

The Oaths Act 1978 (c. 19) is an act of the Parliament of the United Kingdom.

== Provisions ==
Part I of the act applies to England, Wales and Northern Ireland.

Section 1 provides that an oath may be administered by the person taking the oath holding the New Testament, or, in the case of a Jew, the Old Testament, in his uplifted hand, and saying or repeating after the officer administering the oath the words "I swear by Almighty God that ...", followed by the words of the oath prescribed by law. In the case of a person who is neither a Christian nor a Jew, the oath shall be administered in any lawful manner. This section includes MPs.

Part II of the act applies to the whole of the United Kingdom.

Section 3 provides that if any person to whom an oath is administered desires to swear with uplifted hand, in the form and manner in which an oath is usually administered in Scotland, he shall be permitted so to do, and the oath shall be administered to him in such form and manner without further question.

Section 4(2) provides that lack of religious belief does not affect the validity of an oath.

Section 5 provides for the making of a solemn affirmation by a person who objects to being sworn. A solemn affirmation may also be used where it is not reasonably practicable to administer an oath in a manner appropriate to a person's religious beliefs.

Section 6 provides that the form of a solemn affirmation is "I, do solemnly, sincerely and truly declare and affirm ..." followed by the words of the oath prescribed by law, omitting any words of imprecation or calling to witness.

=== Repealed enactments ===
Section 7(1) of the act repealed 6 enactments, listed in parts I and II of the schedule to the act.

Part I – Consequential Repeals
Citation	Short title	Extent of repeal
1 & 2 Vict. c. 105	Oaths Act 1838	The whole act.
51 & 52 Vict. c. 46	Oaths Act 1888	The whole act.
9 Edw. 7. c. 39	Oaths Act 1909	The whole act.
9 & 10 Eliz. 2. c. 21	Oaths Act 1961	The whole act.
1977 c. 38	Administration of Justice Act 1977	Section 8.
1977 c. 38	Administration of Justice Act 1977	Section 32(2).

Part II – Repeal of an Obsolete Enactment
Citation	Short title	Extent of repeal
6 Geo. 4. c. 29	Circuit Courts (Scotland) Act 1828	Section 13.
