= Regency Act 1830 =

Act of the Parliament of the United Kingdom on William IV's succession

- Act of Parliament
- Parliament of the United Kingdom
- Long title: An Act to provide for the Administration of the Government in case the Crown should descend to Her Royal Highness the Princess Alexandrina Victoria, Daughter of His late Royal Highness the Duke of Kent, being under the Age of Eighteen Years, and for the Care and Guardianship of Her Person.
- Citation: 1 Will. 4. c. 2
- Territorial extent: United Kingdom

Dates
- Royal assent: 23 December 1830
- Commencement: 23 December 1830 (Note: The Acts of Parliament (Commencement) Act 1793.)
- Repealed: 18 July 1874
Other legislation
| Repealed by | Statute Law Revision Act 1874 |

Status: Repealed

Text of statute as originally enacted

The Regency Act 1830 (1 Will. 4. c. 2) was an act of the Parliament of the United Kingdom passed to provide for the event that King William IV died while the next person in line to the throne was not yet aged 18. It provided for a regency until the new monarch reached the age of 18, and also would have enabled a posthumous child of King William IV to replace Queen Victoria on the throne. However, the act never came into force, because William was not survived by a legitimate child, and Victoria became queen in 1837 a few weeks after turning 18.

== Background ==
When William IV became king in June 1830 he had no legitimate children who could inherit the throne on his death. Aged 64, he was then the oldest person to ascend the British, English, Scottish or Irish thrones. His next younger brother, Prince Edward, had died in 1820 and so the next person in line to the throne was Edward's 11-year-old daughter, Princess Victoria. Therefore, it was necessary to pass a law to provide for the government of the United Kingdom in case Victoria became queen while still underage, or in case William had a child who succeeded to the throne before turning 18. Parliament also decided to clarify the law about what would happen if William's wife, Queen Adelaide, gave birth to his child after he died and Victoria had already become queen.

== Provisions ==
The act stated that if Victoria became queen while still a minor, then her mother, the Duchess of Kent, would become regent until Victoria was 18. However, if William had a legitimate son or daughter then that person would become king or queen instead of Victoria, and the child's mother, Queen Adelaide, would be regent. In either case, whoever was regent would exercise all the powers of the monarchy, except that the regent was prohibited from giving royal assent to a bill to change the line of succession to the throne, or a bill to repeal or alter the Act of Uniformity 1662 or the Protestant Religion and Presbyterian Church Act 1707.

If William's wife, Queen Adelaide, was pregnant at the time of William's death and subsequently gave birth to a living child, the act stipulated that William's child was to immediately and automatically become monarch, replacing Victoria. If this happened then Adelaide would become regent until the child was 18.

Whoever was monarch was prohibited from marrying without the regent's permission until they were 18. Anyone who married the monarch without permission, or who assisted in the marriage, would be guilty of high treason.

If the regent married a Catholic, married a foreigner without permission, or left the United Kingdom, then she would forfeit her office.

=== Detail ===
The act consisted of 12 sections:

- Section 1 vested the regency in Victoria's mother, the Duchess of Kent, if Victoria became queen while under 18, with the title "Regent of the United Kingdom of Great Britain and Ireland". The regent was to have all the powers of a monarch, except those prohibited by section 10. The regency would end when Victoria became 18 or if Queen Adelaide gave birth to a child of King William after his death.
- Section 2 required the Privy Council to proclaim Victoria's accession to the throne, and modified the oath of allegiance by adding to the end the words "Saving the Rights of any Issue of His late Majesty King William the Fourth which may be born of His late Majesty's Consort". This version of the oath was to be used "until Parliament shall otherwise order".
- Sections 3, 4 and 5 were to apply if, after King William's death and Victoria's accession, Queen Adelaide gave birth to his posthumous child. In that event the child would become monarch, Queen Adelaide was to become regent, the Privy Council was to proclaim the accession of the new sovereign "without delay", both Houses of Parliament were to assemble, and the laws concerning the demise of the Crown were to apply as though Queen Victoria had died and the new monarch was her heir.
- Section 6 stated that any official act done without the consent and authority of the regent was to be "absolutely null and void".
- Sections 7 and 8 required the regent to take an oath of office and an oath to maintain the "true Protestant Religion", within one calendar month of becoming regent. At the same time, the regent was also to make a declaration against transubstantiation, the invocation of saints, and mass (this declaration was prescribed in a 1678 act, the Test Act, as a means of barring Catholics from entering Parliament). She was to produce a certificate verifying that she had received the eucharist in a royal chapel, signed by the priest who had administered it. The oaths, declaration and certificate were to be registered in the books of the Privy Council.
- Section 9 made it unlawful for the new monarch to marry while under the age of 18, unless the regent gave written consent. An unlawful marriage was to be null and void, and the person marrying the monarch would be guilty of treason, which was then punishable with death and posthumous quartering. Also any person "acting, aiding, abetting, or concerned in obtaining, procuring, or bringing about any such Marriage" would also be guilty of treason.
- Section 10 prohibited the regent from giving royal assent to a bill to change the line of succession to the throne as established by the Act of Settlement, or to repeal or alter the Act of Uniformity 1662 or the Protestant Religion and Presbyterian Church Act 1707.
- Section 11 disqualified the Duchess of Kent from becoming regent if, in William's lifetime, she married a Catholic or a person "other than a natural-born Subject" without William's consent. After William's death, if either she or his widow married a Catholic or a person other than a natural-born subject without the consent of both Houses of Parliament, or left the United Kingdom, then their regency was to end.
- Section 12 stated that if Queen Adelaide died and King William remarried, then the act was to expire.

== Subsequent developments ==
The whole act was repealed by section 1 of, and the schedule to, the Statute Law Revision Act 1874 (37 & 38 Vict. c. 35), which came into force on 16 July 1874.

== See also ==
- Regency Acts
- Succession to the British throne
