= Act of Uniformity =

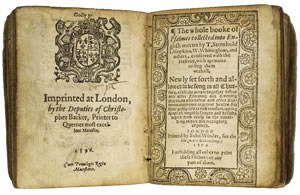
The 1596 version of the Book of Common Prayer.

Over the course of English parliamentary history there were a number of Acts of Uniformity. All had the basic object of establishing some sort of religious orthodoxy within the Church of England.

- The Act of Uniformity 1548 (2 & 3 Edw. 6. c. 1), also called Act of Equality, which established the Book of Common Prayer as the only legal form of worship
- The Act of Uniformity 1551 (5 & 6 Edw. 6. c. 1) required the use of the Book of Common Prayer of 1552
- The Act of Uniformity 1558 (1 Eliz. 1. c. 2), adopted on the accession of Elizabeth I
- The Act of Uniformity 1662 (14 Cha. 2. c. 4), enacted after the restoration of the monarchy
- The Act of Uniformity (Explanation) Act 1663 (15 Cha. 2. c. 6)
- The Act of Uniformity Amendment Act 1872 (35 & 36 Vict. c. 35), modified the preceding acts

== See also ==
- Acts of Supremacy
- Nonconformist (Protestantism)
- Conformity
- Test Acts 1673 & 1678
- Conventicle Act 1664
- Occasional Conformity Act 1711
- Religion in the United Kingdom
- Religious uniformity
- List of short titles
