= Succession to the Crown Act 1707 =

Act of the Parliament of Great Britain

Succession to the Crown Act 1707 (Note: The citation of this act by this short title was authorised by section 1 of, and schedule 1 to, the Short Titles Act 1896. Due to the repeal of those provisions, it is now authorised by section 19(2) of the Interpretation Act 1978.)
- Act of Parliament
- Parliament of Great Britain
- Long title: An Act for the Security of Her Majesties Person and Government and of the Succession to the Crown of Great Britain in the Protestant Line.
- Citation: 6 Ann. c. 41 (Note: This is the citation in The Statutes of the Realm.); 6 Ann. c. 7 (Note: This is the citation in The Statutes at Large.)
- Territorial extent: Great Britain

Dates
- Royal assent: 13 February 1708
- Commencement: 23 October 1707 (Note: Start of session.)
- Repealed: Republic of Ireland: 8 May 2007
Other legislation
Amended by	Demise of the Crown Act 1727; Indemnity Act 1727; Meeting of Parliament Act 1797; Statute Law Revision Act 1867; Sheriffs Act 1887; Statute Law Revision Act 1878; Statute Law Revision Act 1888; Short Titles Act 1896; Magistrates' Courts Act 1952; House of Commons Disqualification Act 1957; Criminal Law Act 1967; Statute Law (Repeals) Act 1973; Statute Law (Repeals) Act 1978; Fixed-term Parliaments Act 2011; Dissolution and Calling of Parliament Act 2022
Repealed by	Republic of Ireland: Statute Law Revision Act 2007
Relates to	Treason Act 1702; Regency Act 1705; Protestant Religion and Presbyterian Church Act 1707; Maintenance of Church of England Act 1706; Lords Justices Act 1837

Status: Amended

Text of statute as originally enacted

Revised text of statute as amended

Text of the Succession to the Crown Act 1707 as in force today (including any amendments) within the United Kingdom, from legislation.gov.uk.

The Succession to the Crown Act 1707 (6 Ann. c. 41) is an act of the Parliament of Great Britain. (Note: This act is chapter 7 in the common printed editions. (See Statute Law Database, "Introduction" note X1.)

As of 2025, the act is still partly in force in Great Britain.

The act was passed at a time when Parliament was anxious to ensure the succession of a Protestant on the death of Queen Anne. It replaced the Regency Act 1705 (4 & 5 Ann. c. 20). The act required privy counsellors and other officers, in the event of Anne's death, to proclaim as her successor the next Protestant in the line of succession to the throne, and made it high treason for any of them to fail to do so.

If the next monarch was overseas at the time of the succession, the government would be run until he or she returned by between seven and fourteen "Lords Justices." Seven of the Lords Justices were named in the act, and the next monarch could appoint seven more, who would be named in writing, three copies of which were to be sent to the Privy Council in England. The act made it treason for any unauthorised person to open these, or to neglect to deliver them to the Privy Council. The Lords Justices were to have the power to give royal assent to bills, except that they would be guilty of treason if they amended the Act of Uniformity 1662 (14 Cha. 2. c. 4) or the Protestant Religion and Presbyterian Church Act 1707 (c. 6).

The act also provided that if Parliament was sitting at the time of the monarch's death, then it would be able to sit for a further six months unless dissolved by a new legitimate monarch. Previously the death of the monarch automatically dissolved Parliament. If the monarch were to die and Parliament was not at that time sitting, then it would immediately convene. These clauses remain in force today (without the six-month time limit on Parliament's continued existence, which was repealed in 1878).

The act also made it treason maliciously, advisedly and directly by writing or printing to maintain and affirm that any person has a right to the Crown otherwise than according to the Act of Settlement 1701 (12 & 13 Will. 3. c. 2) and Acts of Union 1707, or that the Crown and Parliament cannot pass statutes for the limitation of the succession to the Crown. It was praemunire to say so in speech. These provisions were extended to Scotland by the Treason Act 1708 (7 Ann. c. 21), and were repealed in 1967 (however see the Treason Act 1702 (1 Ann. St. 2. c. 21) which makes similar provision).

Anne died on 1 August 1714 and was succeeded as a result of the Act of Settlement 1701 (12 & 13 Will. 3. c. 2) by the Elector of Hanover, George Louis, as King George I, who arrived in Great Britain on 18 September 1714.

== Subsequent developments ==
Demise of the Crown Act 1727
- Act of Parliament
- Parliament of Great Britain
- Long title: An Act for altering and explaining the Acts of Parliament therein mentioned, in relation to qualifying Persons for continuing in Offices; for altering and explaining the Acts of Parliament therein mentioned, in relation to qualifying Persons for continuing in Offices; and to the Continuance of the Sheriffs of the County of Cornwall and County Palatine of Chester, and several other Offices therein mentioned, after the Demise of his late Majesty, his Heirs and Successors; and for continuing such Laws as would expire at the End of this Session of Parliament.
- Citation: 1 Geo. 2. St. 1. c. 5
- Territorial extent: Great Britain

Dates
- Royal assent: 17 July 1727
- Commencement: 27 June 1727
Other legislation
Amends	Succession to the Crown Act 1707
Amended by	Statute Law Revision Act 1867; Statute Law Revision Act 1887; Sheriffs Act 1887; Statute Law Revision Act 1948
Relates to	Succession to the Crown Act 1707

Status: Partially repealed

Text of statute as originally enacted

Revised text of statute as amended

Text of the Demise of the Crown Act 1727 as in force today (including any amendments) within the United Kingdom, from legislation.gov.uk.

The act was clarified by the Demise of the Crown Act 1727 (1 Geo. 2. St. 1. c. 5).

Sections 10–17, 18 to " administer the same,", 19–23 and 30 of the act were repealed by section 1 of, and the schedule to, the Statute Law Revision Act 1867 (30 & 31 Vict. c. 59), which came into force on 15 July 1867.

Sections 1–3 were repealed by section 13 of, and part I of schedule 4 to, the Criminal Law Act 1967, which came into force on 21 July 1967.

Section 8 of the act was repealed by section 1(1) of, and part I of schedule 1 to, the Statute Law (Repeals) Act 1973, which came into force on 18 July 1973.

Section 26 of the act was repealed by section 1(1) of, and part II of schedule 1 to, the Statute Law (Repeals) Act 1978, which came into force on 31 July 1978.

The whole act was formally repealed in the Republic of Ireland by the Statute Law Revision Act 2007.

This act is not to be confused with 6 Ann. c. 14, which is entitled "An act for the better security of Her Majesty's person and government" but which is not about treason.

== See also ==
- Meeting of Parliament Act 1797
- Prorogation Act 1867
- High treason in the United Kingdom
- Treason Act
