= Westminster School Hall =

- Up School
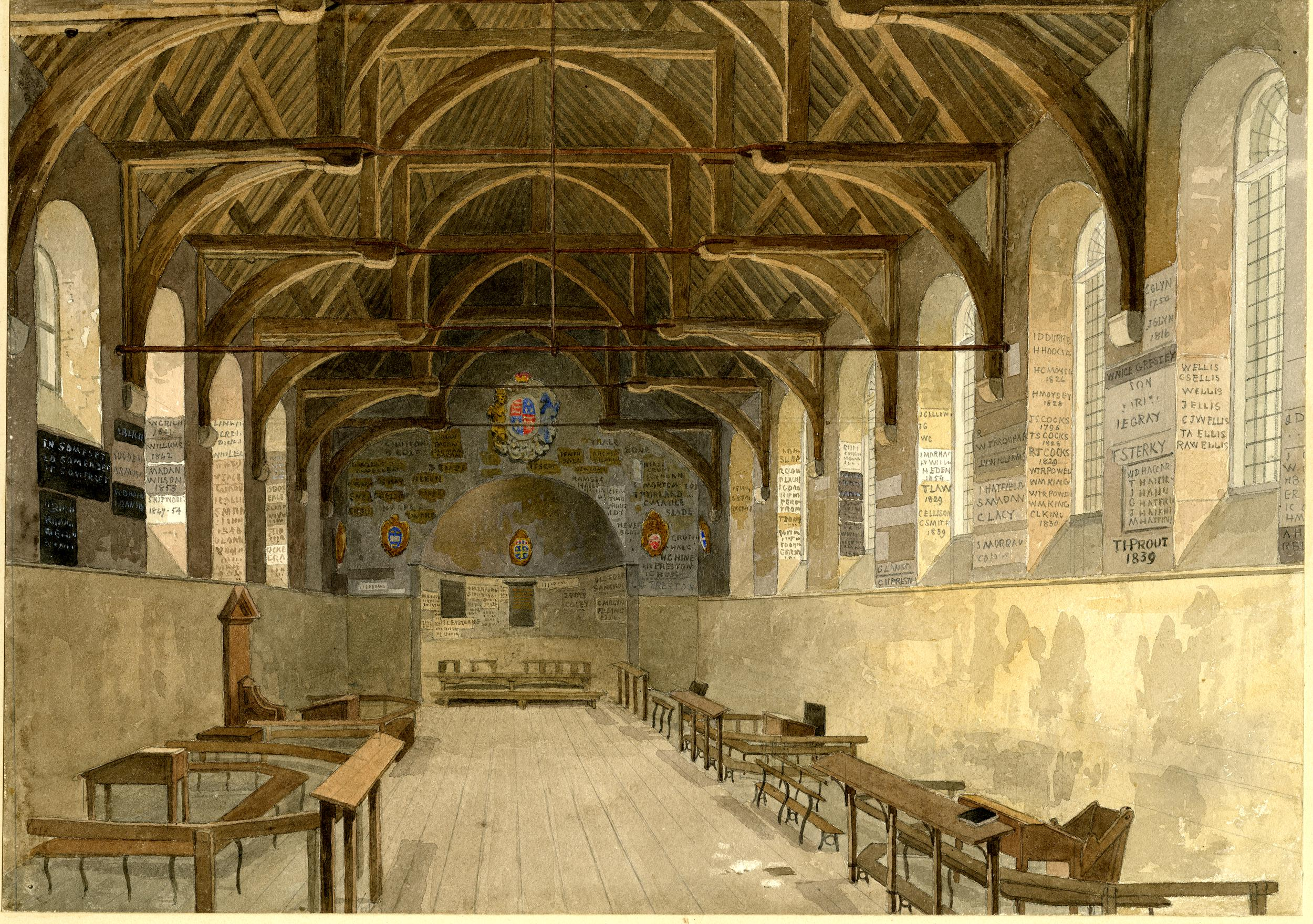
- Interior of the School Hall, Westminster School, 1850
- Interactive map of the Westminster School Hall area

General information
- Type: School hall
- Architectural style: Perpendicular Gothic
- Location: Westminster School, London, England
- Coordinates: 51.4973°N 0.1275°W
- Current tenants: Westminster School
- Completed: c. 1090 (original construction); 14th century (major rebuilding)
- Renovated: Restored in 1950 following damage in The Blitz in 1941
- Owner: Dean and Chapter of Westminster

Design and construction
- Designations: Grade I listed building (Note: The Hall is listed as part of the Westminster Abbey and School precincts.)

Westminster School Hall, commonly known as School or Up School, is the historic school hall of Westminster School in London, England. It is among the oldest surviving parts of the school and has been in continuous use for teaching, examinations, and ceremonial occasions for centuries. Its medieval hammerbeam roof was destroyed by enemy bombing in The Blitz in 1941, during the same raid which damaged the Palace of Westminster.

== History ==
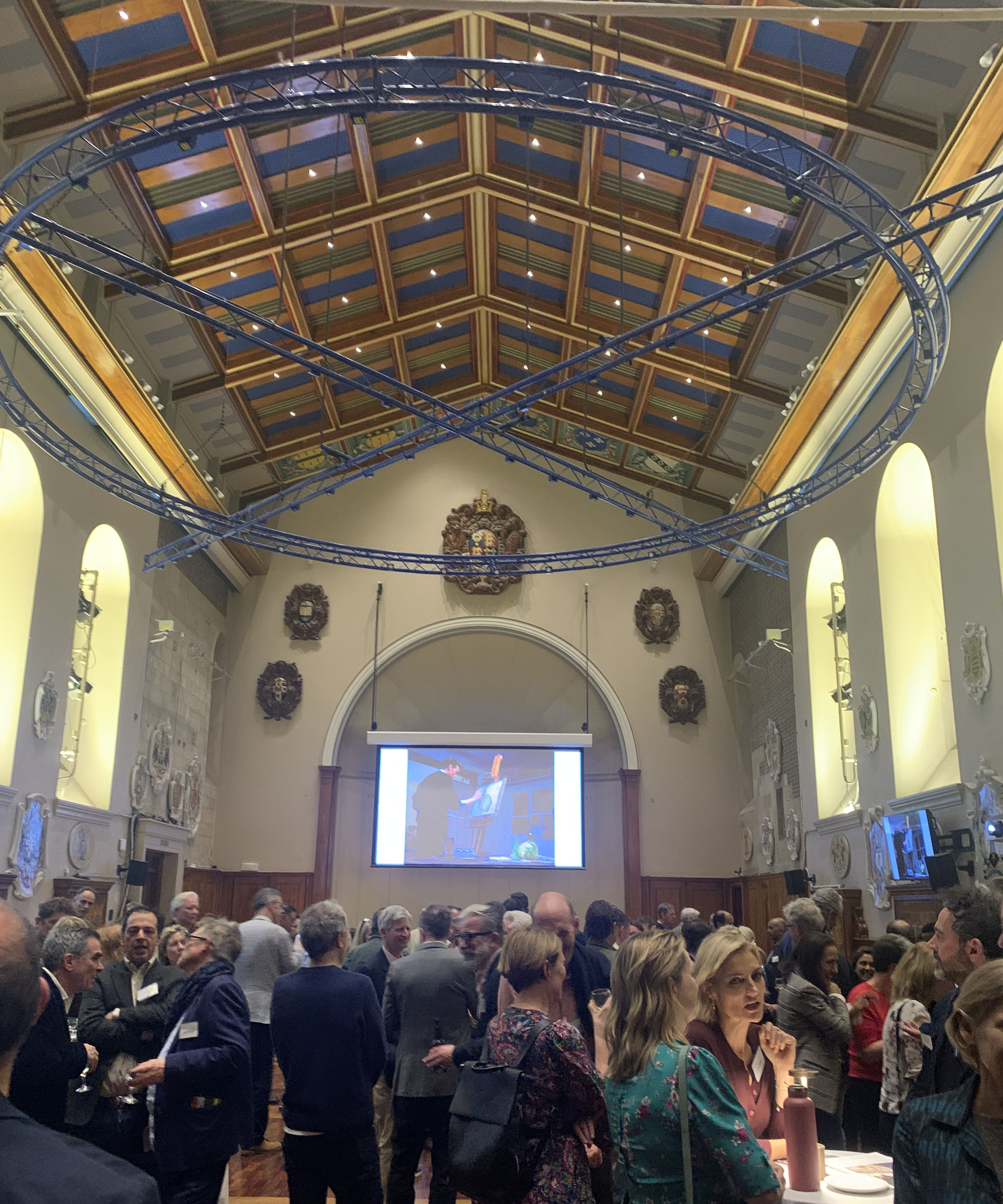
Westminster Hall in 2026

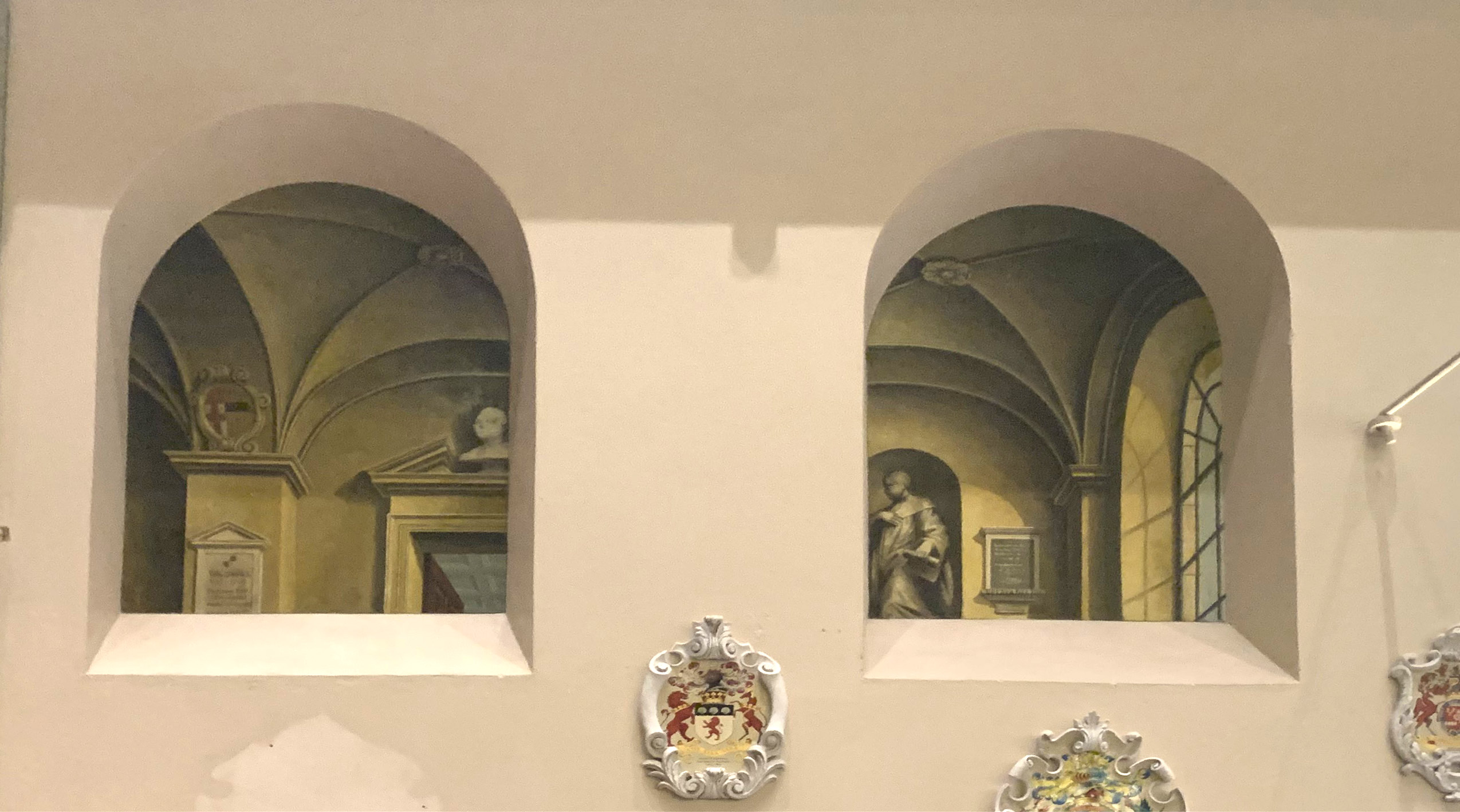
Trompe Loeil in Westminster Hall

Westminster School Hall occupies the site of the medieval dormitory of the monks of Westminster Abbey, originally constructed in the late 11th century. The present structure dates largely from the 14th century, with substantial restorations undertaken in the 19th century. Its hammerbeam roof and Perpendicular Gothic windows are characteristic of high medieval English architecture.

=== Norman Origins ===
The hall was originally built in the 1090s as the monks' dormitory.

=== Early Modern Era ===
From 1599 the hall was used to teach all pupils at Westminster School, the Upper and Lower Schools being separated by a curtain hung from a 16th-century pig iron bar, which remains the largest piece of pig iron in the world. A Chapter Order of 1599 reads: "It is decreed by Mr Deane and the Prebendaries present, that in respect that the now Schole Howse is to low and to litle to conteyne the number of Schollers, that the old Dorter [an 11th Century building], of late yeares begun to be made a larger Schole, shalbe, with all convenient spede, turned to that good use, for the benefyt of the Schollers, by such charitable contributions as may be gathered for the fynishing thereof".

The panelling "up School" is painted with the coats of arms of many former pupils. The original shell-shaped apse at the north end of the school gave its name to the 'Shell' forms taught there. The current shell displays a Latin epigram on the rebuilding of School, with the acrostic Semper Eadem, Elizabeth I's motto.

The classroom door to the right of the Shell was recovered from the notorious Star Chamber at its demolition, but was destroyed during The Blitz. The building lies directly on top of the Westminster Abbey museum in the Norman Undercroft, and ends at the start of the Pyx Chamber.

=== WW2 ===
Both School and College had their roofs destroyed by incendiary bombs in the Blitz, during an enemy air raid on the night of 10–11 May 1941. The House of Commons was severely damaged in the same raid, and Westminster Hall also damaged.

School was re-opened by George VI in 1950, but its historic hammerbeam roof was never restored. The £45,000 cost of restoring the hammerbeam roof compelled the school governors to choose a cheaper and simpler alternative.

== Today ==
Traditionally known as Up School, the hall serves as the principal gathering space for Westminster School. It is used for daily assemblies, prize-givings, examinations, lectures, and concerts. The hall also houses school portraits, memorials, and other historic artefacts connected to the institution. When the whole school assembles for Latin Prayers (a right granted by the Act of Uniformity 1662 to Oxford, Cambridge, Convocation, Westminster, Winchester and Eton) a degree of absenteeism is necessary for all pupils to fit inside.

== The Greaze ==
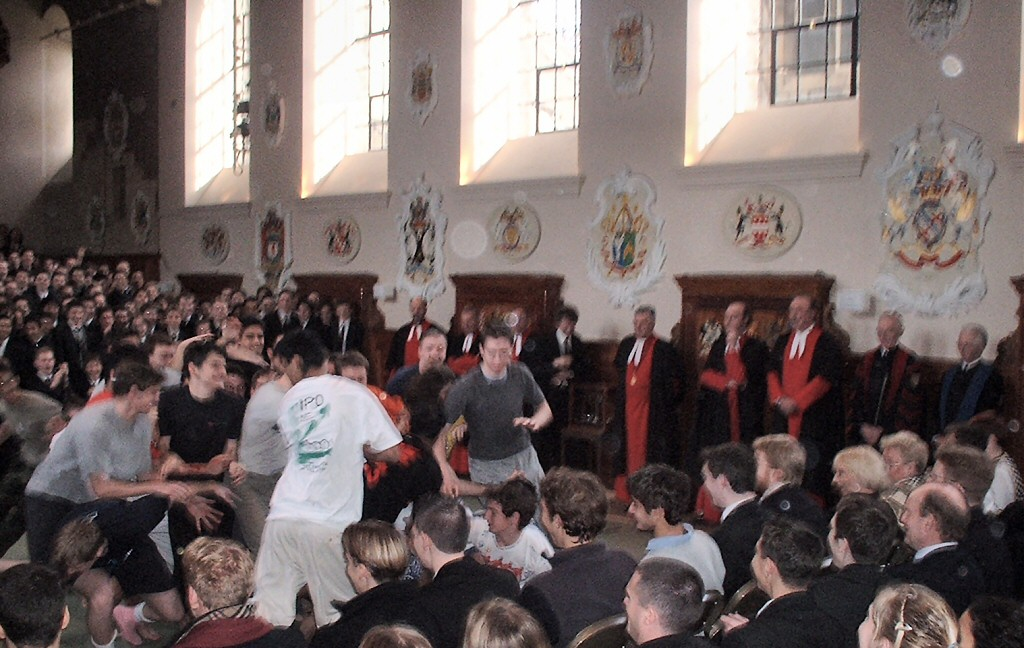
Pupils fight for the pancake (left), watched by the Dean of Westminster and the Head Master.

The Greaze has been held "up School" (in the School Hall) on Shrove Tuesday since around 1753. The head cook tosses a horsehair-reinforced pancake over a high bar. Members of the school fight for the pancake for exactly one minute, watched over by the Dean of Westminster, the Head Master, and the upper year groups of the school. The pupil who gets the largest piece of pancake by weight is awarded a gold sovereign, and the Dean begs for a half-holiday for the whole school. Weighing scales are on hand in the event of a dispute. A cook who failed to get the pancake over the bar after three attempts would formerly have been "booked" or pelted with Latin primers, but this tradition has lapsed.

== Heritage status ==
Westminster School Hall is a Grade I listed building, recognised as of exceptional historic and architectural importance.

== See also ==
- The Greaze
- Westminster School
- Westminster Abbey
- List of the oldest schools in the United Kingdom
