= Anti-Cornish sentiment =

Prejudice towards Cornish people and culture

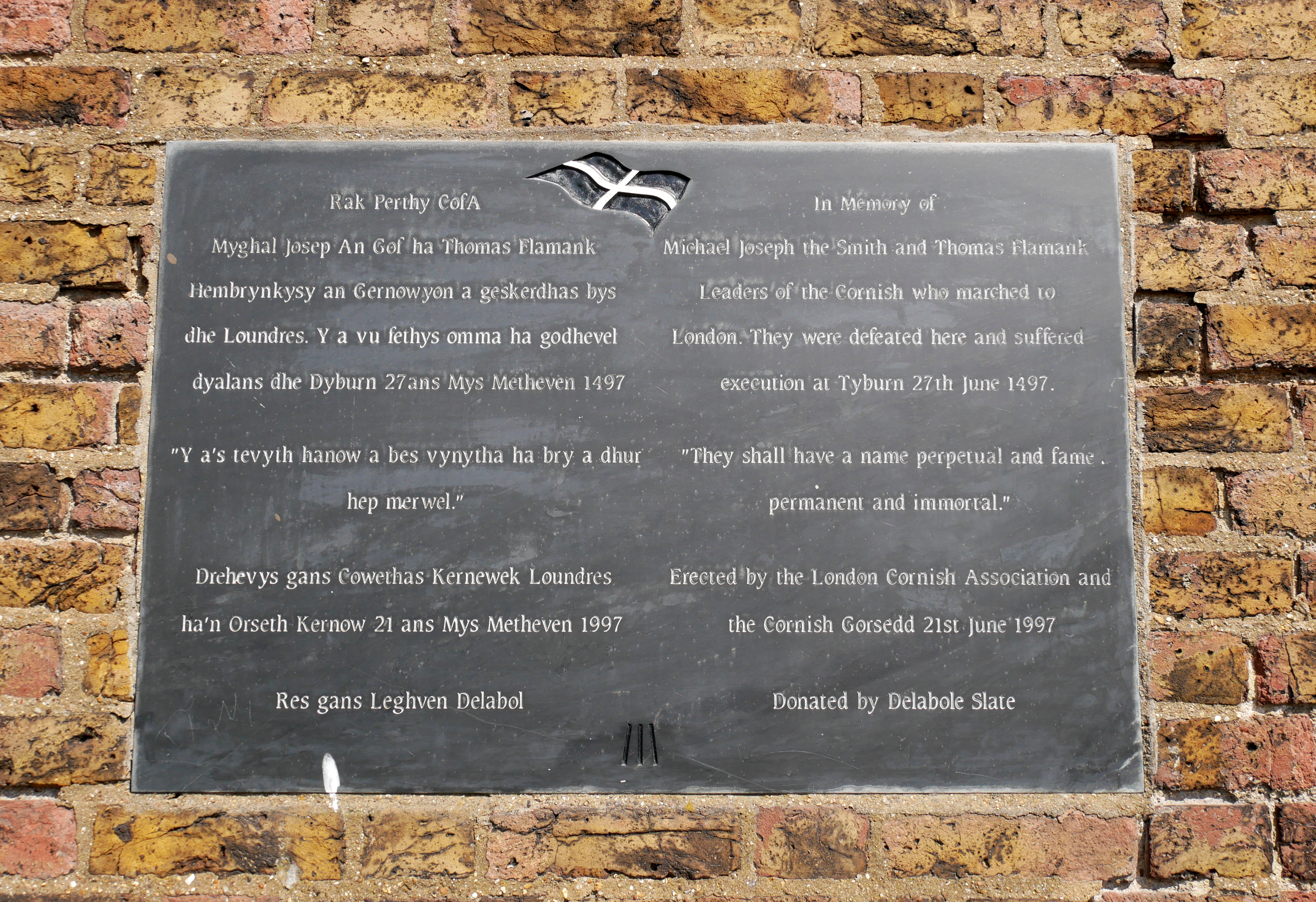
Commemorative plaque for the Cornish rebellion of 1497, a mass uprising against high taxes levied on the Cornish tin mining industry.

Anti-Cornish sentiment refers to oppression, fear, hatred, and discrimination of Cornish people, Cornish culture, the Cornish language, or Cornwall itself.

== History ==
Anti-Cornish sentiment can be traced back to Anglo-Saxon territorial expansion, which pushed the native Celtic Britons to Wales and Cornwall. Æthelstan, the first King of the English, excluded the Cornish as non-English and set a border at the River Tamar to isolate the distinctly Brittonic culture from assimilation into England. The name "Cornwall" itself is an exonym, meaning "foreigners of the horn".

Following the Norman Conquest, land in Cornwall was initially presided over by a Breton-Norman ruling class, many of whom acted as absentee landlords. Land ownership by Cornish natives was rare during this period, but the Breton-Norman class was soon after replaced by a more regional Cornish-Norman one.

=== Cornish rebellion of 1497 ===
While the Cornish tin mining stannaries were given certain tax exemptions, these were suspended in the late 15th century to raise funds for defense against Scottish forces. While extraordinarily high taxes were levied across England at this time, Cornwall was especially burdened, particularly by the collection of a forced loan in 1496. This heavy taxation of a vital part of Cornwall's economy culminated in an uprising, led by leaders such as Michael An Gof, against English rule. It is estimated that around 1,000 Cornish rebels were killed during the ensuing battle at Deptford, London.

=== 1549 Act of Uniformity and rebellion ===
In 1548, the Parliament of England passed the first Act of Uniformity, which aimed to standardize Christian worship and align the country with the ideals of the English Reformation. The act mandated the use of the English Book of Common Prayer, and effectively banned services in Latin. The act was widely unpopular in traditionally Catholic-majority areas like Cornwall (which used Latin as a liturgical language), as it enforced English as the standard for worship, which many Cornish people lacked sufficient knowledge of. This perceived attack on regional identity, coupled with poor economic conditions, culminated in the Prayer Book Rebellion of 1549, during which at least 2,000 Cornish were killed. The Book of Common Prayer was never translated into Cornish as a direct result of the rebellion.

=== Death of the Cornish language ===
Dolly Pentreath, commonly considered the last native speaker of the Cornish language, died in 1777. The language had experienced rapid decline up to this point, as it became heavily associated with sedition by English authorities, and was consequentially repressed whenever possible. Use of the language in worship services had effectively been banned, and the transmission of the language to new generations had almost entirely ceased by the mid-17th century.

=== Modern day ===
Tensions between Cornish and English people have seen a minor resurgence in the modern day, particularly in regards to Cornwall's tourism industry and the purchase of second homes, which is widely seen as harmful to the local real estate market. Cornwall is often considered England's poorest ceremonial county and one of the poorest regions in Northern Europe, as the area faces low average wages and stagnant economic development.

Several proposals have been made for Cornish devolution as a separate constituent country within the United Kingdom; as of 2026, none have seen success.
