= Prorogation in the United Kingdom =

End of a parliamentary session

In United Kingdom constitutional law, prorogation is an act usually used to mark the end of a parliamentary session. Part of the royal prerogative, it is the name given to the period between the end of a session of the UK Parliament and the State Opening of Parliament that begins the next session. The average length of prorogation since 2000 (i.e. calendar days between the date of a new session and prorogation of the previous Session) is approximately 18 days. The parliamentary session may also be prorogued before Parliament is dissolved. The power to prorogue Parliament belongs to the monarch, on the advice of the Privy Council. Like all prerogative powers, it is not left to the personal discretion of the monarch but is to be exercised, on the advice of the prime minister, according to law.

== Procedure and recall ==
Prorogation is the period between the end of a parliamentary session of Parliament and the beginning of a new session (which begins with the State Opening of Parliament). By current practice, Parliament is prorogued by commissioners acting in the sovereign's name. Parliament is always prorogued to a definite day. Parliament, while prorogued, can be recalled by proclamation in accordance with the Meeting of Parliament Act 1797 and the Civil Contingencies Act 2004. The parliamentary procedure for prorogation begins in the House of Lords, and is followed by a procedure in the House of Commons.

== Effect on pending legislation ==
Bills that have not been enacted (i.e., have not yet received royal assent) before prorogation are lost, unless agreed to be carried over. A "carry-over motion" may be tabled (i.e., introduced) by a government minister; the motion, if passed, allows the specified government bills to be carried over to the new session for a period of 12 months from its first reading in the Commons. A bill may not be carried over twice.

== Notable prorogations ==
Prorogation is normally a standard procedure in the calendar of Parliament, but the prerogative has sometimes been used for controversial political objectives.

=== After Petition of Right (1628) ===
King Charles I prorogued the Parliament of England in 1628, after the Petition of Right; this development preceded the era of Charles' Personal Rule.

=== Exclusion Crisis (1678) ===
King Charles II prorogued the Cavalier Parliament in December 1678 to prevent it continuing with the impeachment of the Earl of Danby. He dissolved Parliament that January and called a new Parliament, the Habeas Corpus Parliament, but prorogued it on 27 May 1679 to prevent it passing the Exclusion Bill (to exclude James II, then Duke of York from succeeding to the Crown of England). The next Parliament was summoned in July 1679, but did not meet until October 1680. Charles prorogued this on 10 January 1681 to prevent proceedings to impeach certain judges, dissolving it on 18 January and calling a new Parliament to meet at Oxford. This Oxford Parliament only met from 21 to 28 March 1681, when it too was dismissed by the king.

This and the actions of Charles I were one of the reasons for the Bill of Rights 1689, where article 1 stated that:

the pretended Power of Suspending of Laws or the Execution of Laws by Regal Authority without Consent of Parliament is illegal.

=== The Great Reform crisis (1831) ===
When the House of Commons defeated the First Reform Bill in 1831, the government urged the King to dissolve Parliament, which would lead to a new general election. William IV was initially reluctant, but became irritated by the Opposition, which announced it would move the passage of an Address or resolution against dissolution. Regarding the Opposition's motion as an attack on his prerogative, and at the request of the government, the King prepared to go in person to the House of Lords and prorogue Parliament.

Lord Wharncliffe had given notice of a resolution which was an Address to the monarch against a dissolution.

The next day, 22 April 1831, the Prime Minister went to see the King in order to prevent these stratagems to frustrate the Reform being successful. They decided that, in order to prevent Wharncliffe's motion being carried, the monarch should prorogue the Houses in person, because were Commissioners sent to prorogue the Houses, it was the privilege of Parliament to keep them waiting until they had voted on any pending motion. However, if the monarch came in person, he could interrupt the debate and prorogue Parliament, so that Lord Wharncliffe's motion could not be passed. When initially told that his horses could not be ready at such short notice, the King is supposed to have said, "Then I will go in a hackney cab!".

At 2 p.m. that day the House of Lords assembled. Soon, over the uproar, cannons could be heard indicating the imminent arrival of the King. Crowds cheered the King's coach all the way from St. James's Palace. Hansard records there was a shout of "God save the King". At that moment, large doors were thrown open and the King, wearing his crown, entered the House of Lords. The members of the House of Commons, no less angry than the Lords, came into the chamber at the behest of Black Rod. The King then announced "My lords and gentlemen, I have come to meet you for the purpose of proroguing this Parliament." Wharncliffe's motion was actually under discussion in the House of Lords when the King arrived to prorogue Parliament. Probably, both houses would have joined in advancing Wharncliffe's motion had time been allowed. But by appealing to the people, ministers deprived their opponents of the vantage ground of parliamentary opposition.

=== Clement Attlee's Lords reform (1948) ===
After the Second World War, the Labour government of Clement Attlee decided to amend the Parliament Act 1911 to reduce further the power of the Lords, as a result of their fears that their radical programme of nationalisation would be delayed by the Lords and hence would not be completed within the life of the parliament. The House of Lords did not interfere with nationalisations in 1945 or 1946, but it was feared that the proposed nationalisation of the iron and steel industry would be a bridge too far, so a bill was introduced in 1947 to reduce the time that the Lords could delay bills from three sessions over two years to two sessions over one year. The Lords attempted to block this change. The Bill was reintroduced in 1948 and again in 1949, before the 1911 Act was used to force it through. Since the 1911 Act required a delay over three "sessions", a special short "session" of parliament was introduced in 1948, with a King's Speech on 14 September 1948, and prorogation on 25 October 1948.

=== Cash-for-questions affair (1997) ===
In 1997, John Major, the then prime minister and leader of the Conservative Party, controversially successfully sought a prorogation of parliament at a time that avoided parliamentary debate of the Parliamentary Commissioner's report on the cash-for-questions affair. On that occasion, the prorogation was on 21 March, and was followed by a general election on 1 May, resulting in a change of government to Labour led by Tony Blair.

=== Annulled prorogation attempt (2019) ===
On 28 August 2019, Boris Johnson declared he had asked Queen Elizabeth II to prorogue parliament from between 9–12 September until the opening of a new session on 14 October. Parliament was due to have a three-week recess for party conference season, and if that were to take place as usual then Johnson's prorogation would add around four days to the parliamentary break. The 2017–19 parliamentary session was already the longest since the English Civil War, while the requested prorogation would have been the longest prorogation since 1930.

The government stated that the prorogation was to allow for the government to set out a new legislative agenda. Others questioned this justification and said that the prorogation was an improper attempt to evade parliamentary scrutiny of Johnson's Brexit plans in advance of the UK's departure from the European Union on 31 October 2019; individuals and groups who opposed the prorogation included opposition MPs, UK constitutional law scholars, and Sir John Major, the former Conservative prime minister. The Speaker of the House of Commons, John Bercow, called the decision a "constitutional outrage".

Three separate cases were lodged before the courts alleging its illegality. The High Court of Justice in London found the issue to be non-justiciable, but the highest civil court in Scotland, the Court of Session sitting in Edinburgh, ruled prorogation was unlawful as it had the "improper purpose of stymieing Parliament". The issue was brought before the Supreme Court of the United Kingdom on 17 September 2019 in the cases R (Miller) v The Prime Minister and Cherry v Advocate General for Scotland, heard jointly. On 24 September, the Supreme Court ruled unanimously that the prorogation was both justiciable and unlawful, and therefore null and of no effect. Parliament resumed sitting the following day, continuing the parliamentary session. Bercow said he would ensure that the attempted prorogation would be expunged from the House of Commons Journal, the corrected formal record of parliamentary business, and replaced with a statement that Parliament was adjourned for the period of the absence.

In December 2020 the Johnson Government published the Fixed-term Parliaments Act 2011 (Repeal) Bill which would stop courts from ruling on the power to dissolve parliament. This was formally introduced as the Dissolution and Calling of Parliament Bill in 2021 and passed as the Dissolution and Calling of Parliament Act 2022.

== See also ==
- United Kingdom constitutional law
- Prorogation Act 1867
- Premiership of Boris Johnson
- Brexit negotiations in 2019
- General Assembly of Aberdeen
