= Prorogation Act 1867 =

Act of the Parliament of the United Kingdom

Prorogation Act 1867 (Note: The citation of this act by this short title was authorised by section 1 of, and the first schedule to, the Short Titles Act 1896. Due to the repeal of those provisions it is now authorised by section 19(2) of the Interpretation Act 1978.)
- Act of Parliament
- Parliament of the United Kingdom
- Long title: An Act to simplify the Forms of Prorogation during the Recess of Parliament.
- Citation: 30 & 31 Vict. c. 81
- Territorial extent: United Kingdom

Dates
- Royal assent: 12 August 1867
- Commencement: 12 August 1867 (Note: The Acts of Parliament (Commencement) Act 1793.)

Status: Current legislation

Text of statute as originally enacted

Revised text of statute as amended

Text of the Prorogation Act 1867 as in force today (including any amendments) within the United Kingdom, from legislation.gov.uk.

The Prorogation Act 1867 (30 & 31 Vict. c. 81) is an act of the Parliament of the United Kingdom which is still in force in the United Kingdom with amendments.

It was passed to simplify the forms of prorogation during a recess of Parliament. Prorogation is the period from the formal end of a parliamentary session to the opening of the next session. The act allowed the period of a prorogation to be extended to a day at least 14 days later.

== See also ==
- Meeting of Parliament Act 1797
- Succession to the Crown Act 1707
