= Regency Acts =

Acts of the UK Parliament

The Regency Acts are acts of the Parliament of the United Kingdom passed at various times, to provide a regent in the event of the reigning monarch being incapacitated or a minor (under the age of 18). Prior to 1937, Regency Acts were passed only when necessary to deal with a specific situation. In 1937, the Regency Act 1937 (1 Edw. 8. & 1 Geo. 6. c. 16) made general provision for a regent, and established the office of Counsellor of State, a number of whom would act on the monarch's behalf when the monarch was temporarily absent from the realm or experiencing an illness that did not amount to legal incapacity. This act, as modified by the Regency Acts of 1943 and 1953, forms the main law relating to regency in the United Kingdom today.

An example of a pre-1937 Regency Act was the Care of King During his Illness, etc. Act 1811 which allowed Prince George (later King George IV) to act as regent while his father, King George III, was incapacitated.

== History ==
Recent regents

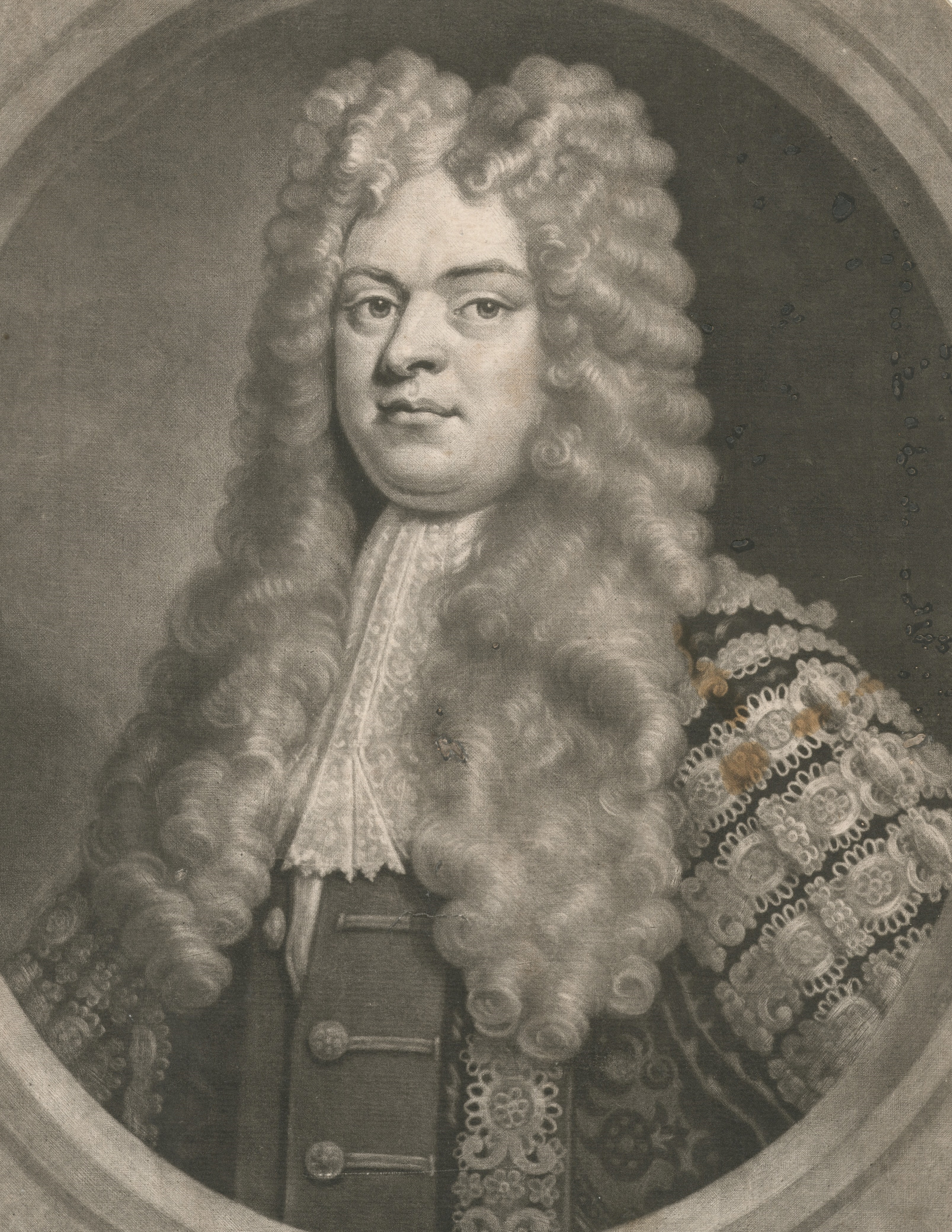
Sir Thomas Parker
August–September 1714

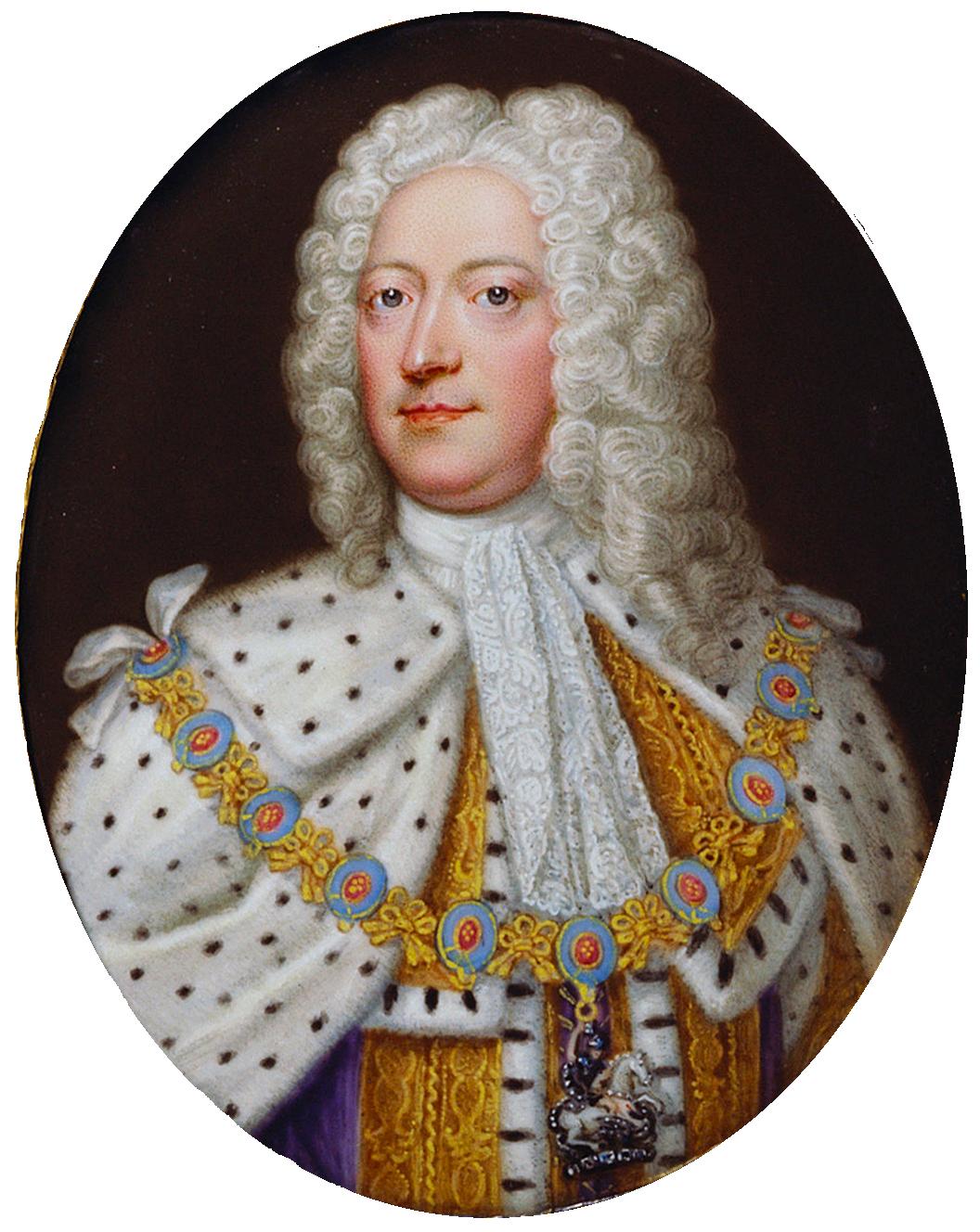
Prince George (future George II)
1716–1717

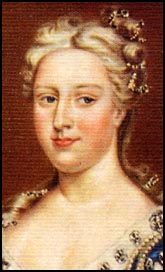
Queen Caroline
May–September 1729, June–September 1732, May–October 1735, 1736–1737

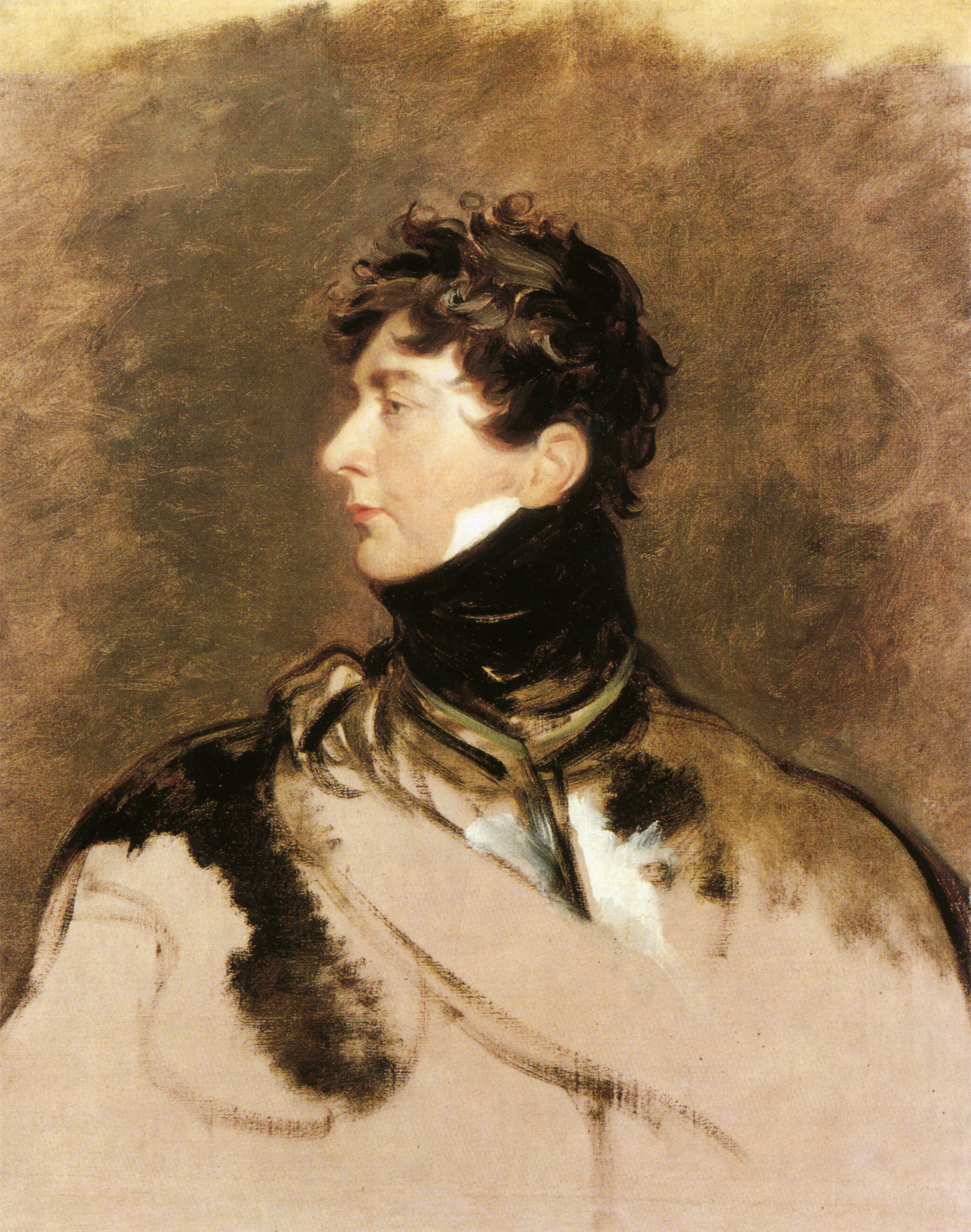
Prince George (future George IV)
1811–1820

Prior to 1937, there was no permanent, general provision in British law for a regent to be appointed if the British monarch were incapacitated, a minor or absent from the country. Before the Glorious Revolution, it was up to the sovereign to decide who would be regent in any event although the decision was often implemented by legislation. For example, section XI of the Treason Act 1554 (1 & 2 Ph. & M. c. 10) made King Philip, the husband and co-ruler of Queen Mary I, regent if Mary died and her heir was male and under 18 or an unmarried female under 15.

By the Act of Settlement 1701, Parliament passed the line of succession to Electress Sophia of Hanover. That decision was confirmed and extended to all of Great Britain by the Acts of Union 1707. With the doctrine of parliamentary supremacy firmly established in British law, it became possible for the British Parliament to pass legislation to determine who would act as regent during the absence, incapacity or minority of the ruling monarch. Since then, several Regency Acts have been passed.

=== Regency Act 1705 and Succession to the Crown Act 1707 ===
With the passage of the Act of Settlement 1701 establishing the Protestant Succession and making Sophia of Hanover the heir presumptive to the throne, it became likely that upon Queen Anne's death the country would be without a monarch in residence. The Regency Act 1705 was passed "to put it [the succession] in such a method as was not to be resisted but by open force of arms and a public declaration for the Pretender".

The act required privy counsellors and other officers in the event of Anne's death, to proclaim as her successor the next Protestant in the line of succession to the throne, and it was made high treason to fail to do so. If the next Protestant successor was abroad at the death of Anne, seven great Officers of State named in the act and others whom the heir apparent thought fit to appoint, called "Lords Justices", would form a regency. The heir would name these others through a secret instrument that would be sent to England in three copies and delivered to the Hanoverian Resident, the Archbishop of Canterbury and the Lord Chancellor. The Lords Justices were to have the power to give royal assent to bills except that they would be guilty of treason if they amended the Act of Uniformity 1662 (14 Cha. 2. c. 4).

Two years later, after the union of Scotland and England, the new Parliament of Great Britain passed the Succession to the Crown Act 1707 (6 Ann. c. 41) to reaffirm the above procedure and modify it slightly. Under the act, if the monarch died while the heir to the throne was overseas, the government would be run until the new monarch returned by between seven and fourteen "Lords Justices". Seven of the Lords Justices were named in the act, and the next monarch could appoint seven others, who would be named in writing, with three copies to be sent to the Privy Council in England.

The act made it treason for any unauthorised person to open them or to neglect to deliver them to the Privy Council. The Lords Justices were to have the power to give royal assent to bills, except that they would be guilty of treason if they amended the Act of Uniformity 1662 or the Protestant Religion and Presbyterian Church Act 1707.

Upon Anne's death in 1714, the new king, George I, was in his home realm of Hanover. In accordance with the Succession to the Crown Act, Thomas Parker, Lord Chief Justice, became head of the regency. He served for a little over a month.

=== Regency Act 1728 ===
Regency During the King's Absence Act 1728
- Act of Parliament
- Parliament of Great Britain
- Long title: An Act to enable her Majesty to be Regent of this Kingdom, during his Majesty's Absence, without taking the Oaths.
- Citation: 2 Geo. 2. c. 27
- Territorial extent: Great Britain

Dates
- Royal assent: 14 May 1729
- Commencement: 21 January 1729 (Note: Start of session.)
- Repealed: 15 July 1867
Other legislation
Repealed by	Statute Law Revision Act 1867
Relates to	Minority of Successor to Crown Act 1750; Minority of Heir to the Crown Act 1765

Status: Repealed

Text of statute as originally enacted

The second act passed by the Parliament of Great Britain to deal exclusively with a regency was in 1728, the Regency During the King's Absence Act 1728 (2 Geo. 2. c. 27). It specified that Queen Caroline would act as regent in the absence of her husband, King George II rather than their son Frederick, Prince of Wales, whom he despised. The act was necessary because George II was also the elector of Hanover and was returning to his homeland for a visit.

=== Minority of Successor to Crown Act 1750 ===
Minority of Successor to Crown Act 1750 (Note: Although the law received was passed in 1751, before 1793 acts of Parliament were retrospective to the start of the session of Parliament, and are officially dated accordingly; in this case to 1750.)
- Act of Parliament
- Parliament of Great Britain
- Long title: An Act to provide for the Administration of the Government, in case the Crown should descend to any of the Children of his late Royal Highness Frederick Prince of Wales, being under the Age of eighteen Years; and for the Care and Guardianship of their Persons.
- Citation: 24 Geo. 2. c. 24
- Territorial extent: Great Britain

Dates
- Royal assent: 22 May 1751
- Commencement: 17 January 1751
- Repealed: 15 July 1867
Other legislation
Repeals/revokes	Acts During King's Nonage Act 1547
Repealed by	Statute Law Revision Act 1867
Relates to	Regency During the King's Absence Act 1728; Minority of Heir to the Crown Act 1765

Status: Repealed

Text of statute as originally enacted

In 1751, Prince Frederick died, thereby leaving his eldest son, Prince George, as the new heir apparent. However, George was then only 12. If the King were to die before Prince George turned 18, the throne would pass to a minor.

Consequently Parliament was forced to provide for a regent by passing the Minority of Successor to Crown Act 1750 (24 Geo. 2. c. 24). (Note: Text of Minority of Successor to the Crown Act 1751) The act provided that George's mother, Augusta, Dowager Princess of Wales, would act as regent and specified that a Council of Regency be put in place to rule alongside Princess Augusta. The Council of Regency was to act as a brake on the regent's power; some acts of the royal prerogative, such as declarations of war or the signing of peace treaties, would require a majority vote of the council. The provisions of the act actually never came into force since Prince George had already come of age by the time that his grandfather died in 1760.

=== Minority of Heir to the Crown Act 1765 ===
Minority of Heir to the Crown Act 1765
- Act of Parliament
- Parliament of Great Britain
- Long title: An Act to provide for the Administration of the Government, in case the Crown should descend to any of the children of his Majesty, being under the Age of eighteen Years; and for the care and guardianship of their Persons.
- Citation: 5 Geo. 3. c. 27
- Territorial extent: Great Britain

Dates
- Royal assent: 15 May 1765
- Commencement: 10 January 1765
- Repealed: 15 July 1867
Other legislation
Repealed by	Statute Law Revision Act 1867

Status: Repealed

Text of statute as originally enacted

In 1760, King George III ascended the throne, with his brother Prince Edward, Duke of York and Albany, as heir presumptive. However, the new King soon married and had several children. By 1765, the King had three infant children in the order of succession. Parliament again passed a Regency Act to provide for a regent in the event of the King's death.

The Minority of Heir to the Crown Act 1765 (5 Geo. 3. c. 27) (Note: Text of Minority of Heir to the Crown Act 1765) provided that either the King's wife, Queen Charlotte, or his mother, Princess Augusta, would act as regent. The act also required the formation of a Council of Regency. As with the previous act, the provision of the new act actually never came into force since when George III died, his eldest son was already aged 57.

=== Regency Bill 1789 ===
The Regency Bill 1789 was a proposed Act of Parliament to provide that George III's eldest son, George, Prince of Wales, would act as regent because of the King's incapacity caused by mental illness. With no legislation already in place, there was no legal basis for providing a regent, and the King was in no fit state to give royal assent to the act. Parliament decided to have the Lord Chancellor, Lord Thurlow, approve the bill by fixing the Great Seal of the Realm to give royal assent. However, the King recovered in time before the bill could be passed. Prince Frederick, Duke of York and Albany, and others thought the act to be illegal, but after his recovery, the King declared that the government had acted correctly.

The King's continuing mental problems throughout the rest of his life confirmed the need for a suitable Regency Act to be in place. However, the King was hostile to the passing of such an Act while he was of sound mind.

=== Care of King During his Illness, etc. Act 1811 ===
Care of King During his Illness, etc. Act 1811
- Act of Parliament
- Parliament of the United Kingdom
- Long title: An Act to provide for the Administration of the Royal Authority, and for the Care of His Majesty's Royal Person, during the Continuance of His Majesty's Illness; and for the Resumption of the Exercise of the Royal Authority by His Majesty.
- Citation: 51 Geo. 3. c. 1
- Territorial extent: United Kingdom

Dates
- Royal assent: 5 February 1811
- Commencement: 5 February 1811 (Note: The Acts of Parliament (Commencement) Act 1793.)
- Repealed: 5 August 1873
Other legislation
Repealed by	Statute Law Revision Act 1873

Status: Repealed

Text of statute as originally enacted

In late 1810, King George III was once again overcome by mental illness after the death of his youngest daughter, Princess Amelia. Parliament agreed to follow the precedent of 1789. Without the King's consent, the Lord Chancellor affixed the Great Seal of the Realm to letters patent naming Lords Commissioners. Such letters patent were irregular because they did not bear the royal sign-manual, and only letters patent signed by the King himself could provide for the appointment of Lords Commissioners or for the granting of royal assent. However, because the King was already incapacitated de facto, resolutions by both Houses of Parliament approved the action and directed the Lord Chancellor to prepare the letters patent and to affix the Great Seal to them even without the signature of the monarch. The Lords Commissioners who were appointed in the name of the King signified the granting of the royal assent to a bill that became the Care of King During his Illness, etc. Act 1811 (51 Geo. 3. c. 1). Under the act, the King was suspended from the personal discharge of the royal functions, and George, Prince of Wales discharged those functions in the name and on behalf of the King from 1811 to 1820, when the King died and the Prince of Wales succeeded to the throne.

Parliament restricted some of the powers of the Prince Regent, as the Prince of Wales became known. These constraints were in regards to appointments to certain offices, though they expired one year after the passage of the act. The period from 1811 to 1820 is known as the Regency era.

The importance of this Regency Act was that it did not require a Council of Regency, as required by previous legislation. One reason was that the Prince Regent was heir apparent to the throne in any case and so would assume full powers upon his father's death.

=== Regency Act 1830 ===
In 1830, the throne passed to George IV's younger brother (George III's third son), King William IV. However, William IV had no surviving legitimate children. The heir presumptive to the throne was his niece, Princess Victoria of Kent, the 11-year-old daughter of William's dead brother Prince Edward, Duke of Kent and Strathearn.

As Parliament was distrustful of the surviving younger sons of George III, the Regency Act 1830 (1 Will. 4. c. 2) placed any potential regency caused by the King's death before Victoria had reached 18, in her mother, Victoria, Dowager Duchess of Kent. However, if Queen Adelaide gave birth to a child, that child would become king or queen instead of Victoria, and Adelaide would become regent.

If such a birth occurred after the King's death, his child was to immediately succeed Victoria in Victoria's lifetime as king or queen. The act prohibited either monarch from marrying during the regency without the Regent's consent and made it high treason to marry the monarch without such consent, or to assist in or be concerned in the marriage. The act also prohibited the regent from giving royal assent to a bill to change the line of succession to the throne or to repeal or alter the Act of Uniformity 1662 or the Scottish Protestant Religion and Presbyterian Church Act 1707.

However, since Victoria became queen at 18, and Queen Adelaide had no more children, a regency was unnecessary and so the act never came into force.

=== Lords Justices Act 1837 ===
Lords Justices Act 1837
- Act of Parliament
- Parliament of the United Kingdom
- Long title: An Act to provide for the Appointment of Lords Justices in the Case of the next Successor to the Crown being out of the Realm at the Time of the Demise of Her Majesty.
- Citation: 7 Will. 4 & 1 Vict. c. 72
- Territorial extent: United Kingdom

Dates
- Royal assent: 15 July 1837
- Commencement: 15 July 1837
- Repealed: 19 March 1937
Other legislation
Amended by	Promissory Oaths Act 1871
Repealed by	Regency Act 1937
Relates to	Act of Uniformity 1662; Oaths of Allegiance and Supremacy Act 1688; Act of Settlement; Protestant Religion and Presbyterian Church Act 1707; Succession to the Crown Act 1707; Treason Act 1766; Sacramental Test Act 1828

Status: Repealed

Text of statute as originally enacted

In 1837, Victoria succeeded her uncle at 18 while she was still unmarried and without children. The next in the line of succession was her uncle, the 66-year-old Ernest Augustus, Duke of Cumberland, who succeeded King William IV in the Kingdom of Hanover. Ernest Augustus left the United Kingdom to take up his role in Hanover. That meant that until the Queen married and had legitimate children, the heir presumptive to the throne and his children would reside abroad. Although they would almost certainly return to the United Kingdom in the event of Victoria dying without having been survived by a legitimate child, that would take some weeks by using 19th-century transport.

To provide for the continuation of government in such an instance, Parliament passed the Lords Justices Act 1837 (7 Will. 4 & 1 Vict. c. 72), long title: An Act to provide for the Appointment of Lords Justices in the Case of the next Successor to the Crown being out of the Realm at the Time of the Demise of Her Majesty. The act did not provide for a specific regent to be appointed, as it was expected that the new monarch would arrive in the country within a reasonable time. Thus the act provided only for Lords Justices, including such people as the Archbishop of Canterbury and the Lord Chief Justice, to take up some of the monarch's duties. Unlike the powers granted to prospective regents in previous legislation, the powers of the Lords Justice were more limited; for example, they could not dissolve Parliament or create peerages.

=== Regency Act 1840 ===
Regency Act 1840
- Act of Parliament
- Parliament of the United Kingdom
- Long title: An Act to provide for the Administration of the Government in case the Crown should descend Issue of Her Majesty whilst such Issue shall be under the Age of Eighteen Years, and for the Care and Guardianship of such Issue.
- Citation: 3 & 4 Vict. c. 52
- Territorial extent: United Kingdom

Dates
- Royal assent: 4 August 1840
- Commencement: 4 August 1840
- Repealed: 7 August 1874
Other legislation
Repealed by	Statute Law Revision Act 1874 (No. 2)
Relates to	Act of Uniformity 1662; Oaths of Allegiance and Supremacy Act 1688; Act of Settlement; Protestant Religion and Presbyterian Church Act 1707; Treason Act 1766

Status: Repealed

Text of statute as originally enacted

By 1840, Queen Victoria had married her cousin, Prince Albert of Saxe-Coburg and Gotha and soon gave birth to Princess Victoria. It was expected that the Queen would have many other children; however, they would be in minority for at least the next 18 years, and Parliament again would have to provide for a regent in the event of Victoria's death. The previous Lords Justices Act 1837 would not apply to the Queen's children, as they resided in the UK. Parliament therefore passed the Regency Act 1840 (3 & 4 Vict. c. 52), which provided for Prince Albert to rule as regent until the eldest son (or daughter, if no sons) reached the age of 18. The act did not require a Regency Council to operate alongside Prince Albert, which potentially gave him more power than earlier proposed regents. The act was fairly controversial at the time, as the British people were suspicious of Prince Albert, and he was generally unpopular in Parliament. However Victoria lived until 1901 (thus her surviving children were adults by then), and in any case, Albert predeceased her and so he did not become the regent.

The act would have prohibited the monarch from marrying during the regency without written consent from the Regent and both houses of Parliament and made it high treason to marry the monarch without such consent, or to assist in or be concerned in the marriage. The act also prohibited the regent from giving royal assent to a bill to change the line of succession to the throne or a bill to repeal or alter the Act of Uniformity 1662 or the Scottish Protestant Religion and Presbyterian Church Act 1707.

=== Regency Act 1910 ===
Regency Act 1910 (Note: Section 6.)
- Act of Parliament
- Parliament of the United Kingdom
- Long title: An Act to provide for the Administration of the Government in case the Crown should descend to any issue of His Majesty while such issue shall be under the age of eighteen years, and for the care and guardianship of such issue.
- Citation: 10 Edw. 7. & 1 Geo. 5. c. 26
- Territorial extent: United Kingdom

Dates
- Royal assent: 3 August 1910
- Commencement: 3 August 1910
- Repealed: 22 December 1927
Other legislation
Repealed by	Statute Law Revision Act 1927
Relates to	Act of Settlement; Protestant Religion and Presbyterian Church Act 1707; Treason Felony Act 1848

Status: Repealed

Text of statute as originally enacted

In 1910 King Edward VII's son, King George V, acceded to the throne. However, his children were all under the age of 18. Therefore, Parliament passed the Regency Act 1910 (10 Edw. 7. & 1 Geo. 5. c. 26) in 1910, that named the king's consort, Queen Mary, as regent-designate. No regency council was provided for, following the Regency Act 1840. As in previous legislation, this Act again prohibited the regent from giving royal assent to a bill to change the line of succession to the throne or a bill to repeal or alter the Scottish Protestant Religion and Presbyterian Church Act 1707.

Once again, the provisions of this act never came into operation, as the Prince of Wales was well over 18 by the time George V died.

== Acts currently in force governing the establishment of a regency ==
The acts currently in force governing the cases in which a Regency shall come into existence and when a regency shall cease, the determination of who shall be regent and the powers of such regent are the Regency Act 1937 (1 Edw. 8. & 1 Geo. 6. c. 16), the Regency Act 1943 (6 & 7 Geo. 6. c. 42), and the Regency Act 1953 (2 & 3 Eliz. 2. c. 1), jointly referred to as the "Regency Acts 1937 to 1953".

=== Regency Act 1937 ===
Regency Act 1937 (Note: Section 8(1).)
- Act of Parliament
- Parliament of the United Kingdom
- Long title: An Act to make provision for a Regency in the event of the Sovereign being on His Accession under the age of eighteen years, and in the event of the incapacity of the Sovereign through illness, and for the performance of certain of the royal functions in the name and on behalf of the Sovereign in certain other events; to repeal the Lords Justices Act 1837; and for purposes connected with the matters aforesaid.
- Citation: 1 Edw. 8. & 1 Geo. 6. c. 16
- Introduced by: Stanley Baldwin (Commons)
- Territorial extent: United Kingdom

Dates
- Royal assent: 19 March 1937
- Commencement: 19 March 1937 (Note: Acts of Parliament (Commencement) Act 1793.)
Other legislation
Amends	Act of Settlement 1701
Repeals/revokes	Lords Justices Act 1837
Amended by	Regency Act 1943; Regency Act 1953; Statute Law (Repeals) Act 1995; Succession to the Crown Act 2013; Dissolution and Calling of Parliament Act 2022; Counsellors of State Act 2022
Relates to	Protestant Religion and Presbyterian Church Act 1707; Maintenance of Church of England Act 1706

Status: Amended

Text of statute as originally enacted

Revised text of statute as amended

Text of the Regency Acts as in force today (including any amendments) within the United Kingdom, from legislation.gov.uk.

In 1936, Edward VIII abdicated, leaving George V's second son Prince Albert to become George VI, with his elder daughter, Princess Elizabeth, as heir presumptive. However, Elizabeth was under the age of 18, leading to the need for a new regency act.

Rather than pass a specific regency act relating to the death or incapacity of George VI only, Parliament passed the Regency Act 1937 (1 Edw. 8 & 1 Geo. 6. c. 16), which provided for the potential incapacity or minority of all future monarchs. It also repealed the Lords Justices Act 1837, and established in statute the office of counsellor of state, to be appointed during the monarch's absence abroad, or temporary illness not amounting to complete incapacity.

The act ordered that a regent should perform the royal functions if "the Sovereign is by reason of infirmity of mind or body incapable for the time being of performing the royal functions or that they are satisfied by evidence that the Sovereign is for some definite cause not available for the performance of those functions". Such a determination must be made by at least three of:

- the Sovereign's consort
- the Lord Chancellor
- the Speaker of the House of Commons
- the Lord Chief Justice of England
- the Master of the Rolls

The act required that the regent should be the next person in the line of succession who was:

- over the age of 21
- a British subject domiciled in the United Kingdom
- capable of succeeding to the Crown under the terms of the Act of Settlement 1701

The counsellors of state were to consist of:

- the monarch's consort
- the next four people in the line of succession over the age of 21, excluding any person who is disqualified from being regent

Thus, at the time of the passing of the act, Prince Henry would have become regent in the event that King George VI died while Princess Elizabeth was still a minor. The current prospective regent under the act, who would assume the functions of regent should Charles III become incapacitated, would be his elder son William, Prince of Wales.

Section 4 of the act prohibits the regent from giving royal assent to a bill to change the line of succession to the British throne or to repeal or alter the Scottish Protestant Religion and Presbyterian Church Act 1707. (This copied section 4 of the Regency Act 1910.)

=== Regency Act 1943 ===
Regency Act 1943 (Note: Section 2.)
- Act of Parliament
- Parliament of the United Kingdom
- Long title: An Act to amend the law as to the delegation of royal functions to Counsellors of State.
- Citation: 6 & 7 Geo. 6. c. 42
- Introduced by: Viscount Simon (Lords)
- Territorial extent: United Kingdom

Dates
- Royal assent: 11 November 1943
- Commencement: 11 November 1943
Other legislation
Amends	Regency Act 1937
Relates to	Regency Act 1953

Status: Current legislation

Text of statute as originally enacted

Revised text of statute as amended

Text of the Regency Act 1943 as in force today (including any amendments) within the United Kingdom, from legislation.gov.uk.

The Regency Act 1943 (6 & 7 Geo. 6. c. 42) modified the Regency Act 1937 (1 Edw. 8. & 1 Geo. 6. c. 16) so that counsellors of state who were absent during the Sovereign's absence would not be listed among the appointments. It also declared that the heir-apparent or presumptive to the throne (first in the line of succession) only had to be 18 to be a counsellor; this would allow then-Princess Elizabeth to begin serving as a counsellor shortly after the passage of the act (her 18th birthday being 21 April 1944).

=== Regency Act 1953 ===
Regency Act 1953 (Note: Section 4(1).)
- Act of Parliament
- Parliament of the United Kingdom
- Long title: An Act to provide that, in the event of a Regency becoming necessary under the Regency Act 1937, His Royal Highness the Duke of Edinburgh shall in certain circumstances be the Regent, to provide that the heir apparent or heir presumptive to the Throne shall be deemed for the purposes of that Act to be of full age if he or she has attained the age of eighteen years, to add Her Majesty Queen Elizabeth the Queen Mother to the persons to whom royal functions may be delegated as Counsellors of State, and for purposes connected with the matters aforesaid.
- Citation: 2 & 3 Eliz. 2. c. 1
- Introduced by: Winston Churchill (Commons)
- Territorial extent: United Kingdom

Dates
- Royal assent: 19 November 1953
- Commencement: 19 November 1953
Other legislation
Amends	Regency Act 1937
Relates to	Regency Act 1943

Status: Current legislation

Text of statute as originally enacted

Revised text of statute as amended

Text of the Regency Act 1953 as in force today (including any amendments) within the United Kingdom, from legislation.gov.uk.

In 1952 King George VI died and was succeeded by his elder daughter Elizabeth II. With her eldest son and heir apparent, Prince Charles, under the age of 18, the Regency Act 1937 would provide for the next person over the age of 21 in the line of succession, the Queen's sister Princess Margaret, to act as regent. However, although a regency was already provided for, Parliament made a new law creating a provision specific to the scenario of the succession to the throne of a son or daughter of Queen Elizabeth II and her husband, Prince Philip, while still under the age of 18 years. That provision, which ceased to have any relevance in law once the children of Elizabeth and Philip reached adulthood, was to the effect that Prince Philip, if living, would act as regent in case of an underage succession to the Crown by one of the children born of his marriage to Queen Elizabeth II. Similarly, Prince Philip would become the Queen's regent if she became incapacitated and they had no children or grandchildren able to be her regent.

This did not remove Princess Margaret as a potential regent, but simply gave Prince Philip priority over her. At the bill's second reading, David Maxwell-Fyfe, the Home Secretary, explained:

The Amendment is confined to the Duke, and accordingly, in the event of the Duke's death, which we all fervently hope will not occur for many years, the Amendment would cease to have effect, and in the circumstances in which provision is made by the Bill for the Duke being the Regent, the Princess Margaret would, if alive, be Regent. This is in no sense an exclusion Bill.

The act also allowed the Queen's mother, Queen Elizabeth the Queen Mother, to become a Counsellor of State again, a position she had lost on the death of her husband King George VI.

Most of the provisions of the Regency Act 1953 (2 & 3 Eliz. 2. c. 1) ceased to be applicable as the Queen's children came of age, except in the unlikely event that the Queen's children all passed away before her grandchildren became of age. The sole provision of the 1953 Act that is still relevant is section 2, which reduced to 18 the age at which the heir-apparent or heir-presumptive to the throne could become Regent. This was done to remove the perceived anomaly that a person aged 18 could become a counsellor of state and could, upon accession to the throne, personally discharge the royal functions, but could not act as a regent until 21. In fact, this had been intended in 1937. In 1937, when the bill was still in committee, the attorney-general Donald Somervell had said:

There might well arise a case where the heir to the Throne was under 18 years of age and where it would be necessary to have a Regent, but that such Regent would only be a few months older. It would then be rather absurd to appoint as Regent someone only six months older than the King. Consequently ... there should be a minimum difference of three years.

=== Counsellors of State Act 2022 ===
Counsellors of State Act 2022 (Note: Section 2(1).)
- Act of Parliament
- Parliament of the United Kingdom
- Long title: An Act to add His Royal Highness The Earl of Wessex and Her Royal Highness The Princess Royal to the persons to whom royal functions may be delegated as Counsellors of State.
- Citation: 2022 c. 47
- Introduced by: Oliver Dowden MP, Chancellor of the Duchy of Lancaster (Commons); Lord True (Lords)
- Territorial extent: United Kingdom

Dates
- Royal assent: 6 December 2022
- Commencement: 7 December 2022 (Note: Section 2(2).)
Other legislation
Amends	Regency Act 1937

Status: Current legislation

History of passage through Parliament

Text of statute as originally enacted

Revised text of statute as amended

The Counsellors of State Act 2022 (c. 47) appointed Princess Anne and Prince Edward as additional Counsellors of State for their lifetimes, a position each had previously held but subsequently lost when Prince William and Prince Harry respectively reached the age of eligibility. This was reported as intended to avoid the possible necessity of Prince Andrew (now Andrew Mountbatten-Windsor), beset by scandals, acting as a Counsellor of State.

== Situations in which the royal functions are transferred to a regent ==
According to the Regency Acts 1937 to 1953, presently in force, there is provision for the establishment of a regency either on account of the minority of the monarch or of the absolute incapacity of the monarch to discharge the royal functions.

=== Regency in the case of the minority of the sovereign ===
According to the Regency Acts in force, if the monarch is under the age of 18 years when he or she succeeds to the throne, a regency is automatically established, and, until the monarch attains the age of 18 years, the royal functions are discharged by the regent in the name and on behalf of the monarch.

In that case, any oaths or declarations required by statute to be taken by the sovereign on or after succeeding to the Crown are postponed until the sovereign's personal assumption of the royal functions, and for the purpose of all such enactments regarding oaths and declarations that the new monarch must make upon accession "the date on which the Sovereign attains the age of eighteen years shall be deemed to be the date of His Accession".

=== Regency in the case of infirmity or unavailability ===
Unlike any of the preceding Regency Acts, the Regency Act 1937 (which is still in force) established in law a procedure for determining the incapacity of the sovereign due to infirmity of mind or body or due to the monarch's unavailability for another definite cause.

When a declaration of incapacity is made in accordance with the procedure set out in the Regency Act 1937 a regency is established and the royal functions are transferred from the sovereign to a regent, who discharges them in the name and on behalf of the monarch until a declaration is made in accordance with the said Act to the effect that the monarch's incapacity has ceased.

==== Declarations of incapacity and capacity ====
According to section 2 of the Regency Act 1937, the people who can make a declaration of incapacity (or a declaration that the incapacity has ended) are the sovereign's consort, the Lord Chancellor, the Speaker of the House of Commons, the Lord Chief Justice of England and Wales, and the Master of the Rolls. As of 5 September 2026 these positions are held by, respectively, Queen Camilla, Alex Norris, Sir Lindsay Hoyle, Baroness Carr of Walton-on-the-Hill, and Sir Geoffrey Vos.

Any declaration of incapacity or of cessation of incapacity needs to be signed by three or more of them. Declarations based on the monarch's unavailability for a definite cause need to be supported by evidence, and declarations attesting the sovereign's incapacity by reason of infirmity of mind or body need to be supported by evidence including evidence provided by physicians.

A declaration of incapacity or of cessation of incapacity needs to be made to the Privy Council and communicated to the governments of the dominions.

== Incapacity of the Regent ==
Under the Regency Act 1937, a declaration of incapacity can also be made with respect to the regent. Thus, if the person serving as regent becomes incapable of discharging the royal functions, either on account of an infirmity of mind or body, or because the regent has become, for a definite cause, unavailable to perform the said functions, then the spouse of the regent, the Lord Chancellor, the Speaker of the House of Commons, the Lord Chief Justice of England, and the Master of the Rolls are empowered to make a declaration of incapacity regarding the regent.

Under section 3(5) of the Regency Act 1937, when the regent is the object of a declaration of incapacity, he or she ceases to be the regent, as if he or she were dead, and the person next in line capable of discharging the regency becomes regent in his or her place.

== Assumption of office by the Regent: oaths to be taken before the Privy Council ==
Whenever a regency is established, either on account of incapacity of the sovereign (duly declared in accordance with the procedure prescribed in statute), or on account of the minority of the Sovereign, and also when there is a change of regent, the new "Regent shall, before he acts in or enters upon his office," take the oaths required by the Regency Act 1937; accordingly, a new regent only enters into the execution of his office by taking the oaths, and therefore cannot discharge any of the royal functions before taking them.

The oaths required to be taken by a new Regent upon his assumption of office are as follows:

I swear that I will be faithful and bear true allegiance to [here insert the name of the Sovereign] his heirs and successors according to law. So help me God.

I swear that I will truly and faithfully execute the office of Regent, and that I will govern according to law, and will, in all things, to the utmost of my power and ability, consult and maintain the safety, honour, and dignity of [here insert the name of the Sovereign] and the welfare of his people. So help me God.

I swear that I will inviolably maintain and preserve in England and in Scotland the Settlement of the true Protestant religion as established by law in England and as established in Scotland by the laws made in Scotland in prosecution of the Claim of Right, and particularly by an Act intituled "An Act for Securing the Protestant Religion and Presbyterian Church Government" and by the acts passed in the Parliament of both Kingdoms for Union of the two Kingdoms, together with the Government, Worship, Discipline, Rights, and Privileges of the Church of Scotland. So help me God.

The said oaths need to be taken and subscribed by the new Regent before the Privy Council, and the Regency Act, 1937 specifies that "the Privy Council are empowered and required to administer those oaths and to enter them in the Council Books".

== Guardianship of the sovereign during a regency ==
Unlike the situations of minor infirmity or of travel abroad that allow for the possible delegation of the royal functions by the monarch to counsellors of state (as authorised by section 6 of the Regency Act 1937), the establishment of a regency carries with it the notion that the sovereign is not fit and able to administer the affairs of his own person, so that he needs a legal guardian. The guardianship of the monarch, however, is not governed by the same ordinary body of laws that regulate the appointment of legal guardians to people in general. Instead of the legal guardian of the sovereign being appointed by a court based on the recommendations of the social services, the guardianship of the monarch is provided for directly by Regency Act 1937, presently in force.

Because the sovereign in his or her private capacity is not subject to the jurisdiction of the courts, the institution of a regency remains the sole method of placing the person of the sovereign under legal guardianship. And, according to the provisions of the Regency Acts in force, the creation of a regency to discharge the royal functions and the legal guardianship of the monarch go hand in hand: the monarch is only subject to legal guardianship when there is a regency, and always when there is a regency the monarch is placed under legal guardianship.

The legal guardianship of the person of the monarch (with the corresponding power to administer the private property of the sovereign) does not necessarily rest with the regent. However, if the none of the prospective guardians provided for in the statute exist, then, also according to the statute, the regent becomes the guardian of the sovereign. Accordingly, during a regency, the regent is the person invested with the royal authority, that discharges the royal functions on behalf of the monarch. The guardian, on the other hand, has the legal custody of the sovereign (who is either a minor or an incapacitated person) and the duty to care for the monarch's personal well-being. The two roles may or may not be combined.

According to section 5 of the Regency Act 1937, if the monarch is under the age of eighteen years and unmarried, then his or her mother, if living, shall have the guardianship of the monarch's person. On the other hand, if the sovereign is married, but is still under the age of eighteen years, or if the sovereign is a married adult, but has been declared incapable for the time being of performing the royal functions, then the wife or husband of the sovereign, if of full age, shall have the guardianship of the person of the monarch. In all other cases except the two situations described above (that is, if the sovereign is unmarried and under the age of eighteen years, but his mother is no longer living; or if the sovereign is married, but the wife or husband is not of full age; or if the sovereign has been declared incapable of performing the royal functions, but does not have a wife or husband), then the regent shall be the legal guardian of the monarch and shall have custody of his or her person, and the property of the sovereign, except any private property which in accordance with the terms of any trust affecting it is to be administered by some other person, shall be administered by the regent.

== Current position ==
=== Regency ===
As of 2026, under the provisions of the Regency Acts in force, William, Prince of Wales, would become regent in the event of the incapacity of his father, King Charles III.

As of 2026, the first person under the age of 18 in the line of succession to the throne is William's eldest child Prince George of Wales, who is second in line to the throne after his father. If the prince were to succeed to the throne before his 18th birthday on 22 July 2031, his uncle, Prince Harry, Duke of Sussex (Charles's younger son), would serve as regent (if domiciled in the United Kingdom, as required by the 1937 Act), as George's younger siblings Charlotte and Louis (currently third and fourth in line, respectively) would also be minors. If Prince Harry were to be disqualified from being able to be regent by virtue of his domicile status (a possibility since his 2019 decision to take up residence in the United States) or otherwise unable to serve as regent, the next in line would be Charles's brother (Prince George's great-uncle) Andrew Mountbatten-Windsor, followed by Andrew's daughters Princess Beatrice and Princess Eugenie (in that order).

=== Legal guardianship ===
If the King were to be declared incapable of discharging the royal functions, the legal guardianship of the incapacitated monarch would be vested in his consort, Queen Camilla. If she were to be unable to carry out the duties of legal guardian, they would then revert to the sitting regent.

Prince George of Wales, should he ascend to the throne prior to his 18th birthday on 22 July 2031, would be the first person in the present line of succession who would require a regency and legal guardianship until he turned 18. According to the Regency Acts as currently in force, should this occur, his legal guardianship would be vested in his mother, Catherine, Princess of Wales. If she were to be unable to carry out the duties of legal guardian, they would then revert to the sitting regent.

== See also ==
- Letters Patent, 1947, for the position in Canada
