= Counsellor of State =

Proxies performing royal functions for the British monarch

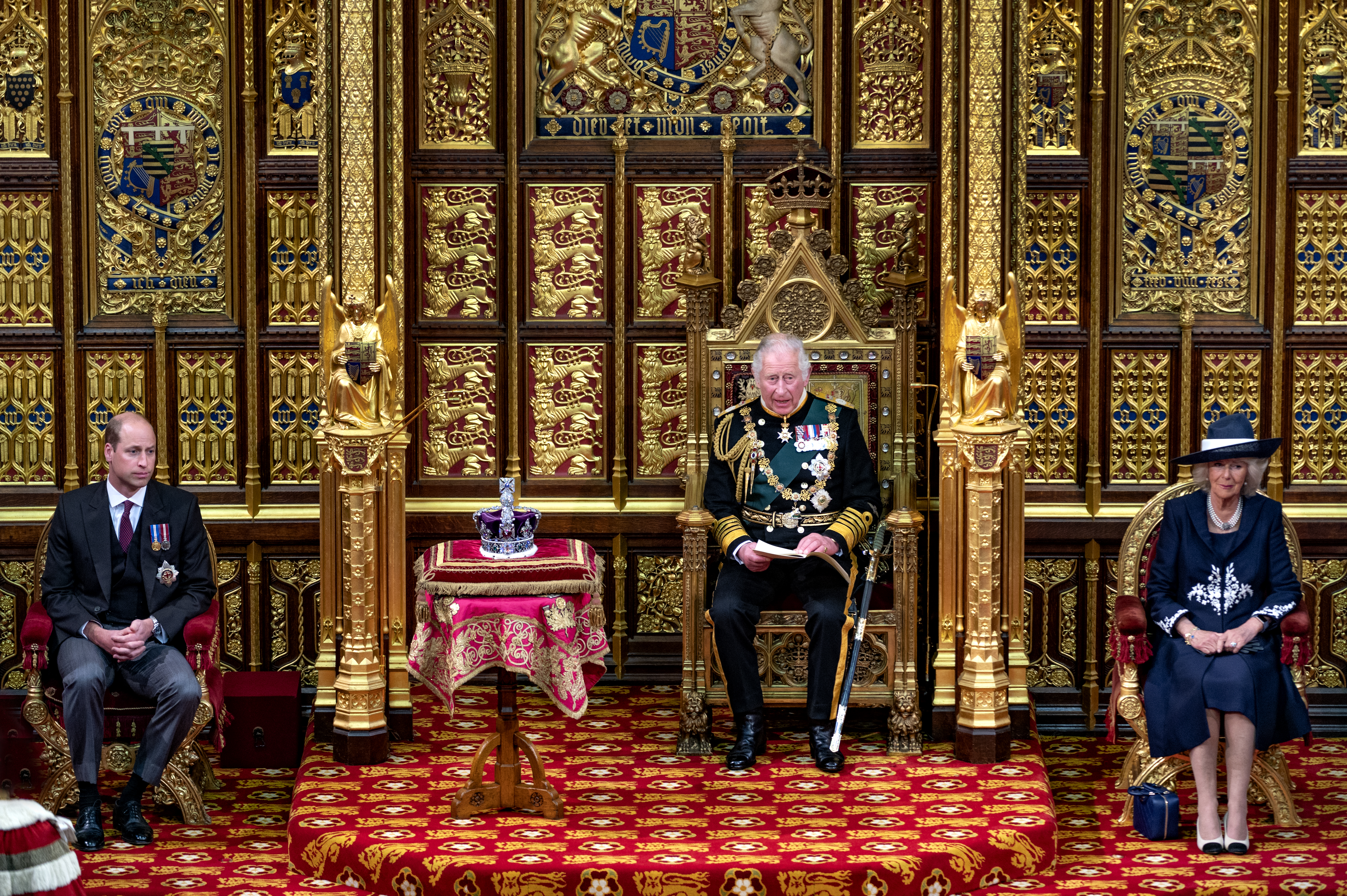
As Counsellors of State, Charles, Prince of Wales, and Prince William, Duke of Cambridge, opened Parliament in May 2022 on behalf of Queen Elizabeth II.

Counsellors of State are senior members of the British royal family to whom the monarch can delegate royal functions through letters patent under the Great Seal, to prevent delay or difficulty in the dispatch of public business in the case of their illness (except total incapacity) or of their intended or actual absence from the United Kingdom.

Counsellors of state may carry out "such of the royal functions as may be specified in the Letters Patent". In practice, this means most of the monarch's official duties, such as attending Privy Council meetings, signing routine documents and receiving the credentials of new ambassadors to the Court of St James's. However, by law, counsellors of state cannot grant ranks, titles or peerages. They also, by the terms of the letters patent, cannot deal with a number of core constitutional functions, such as Commonwealth matters, the dissolution of Parliament (except on the monarch's express instruction) and the appointment of prime ministers. A rare example occurred on 7 February 1974 of the Proclamation of the Dissolution of Parliament being promulgated by Queen Elizabeth the Queen Mother and Princess Margaret as counsellors of state, on the express instructions of Queen Elizabeth II.

Royal functions are to be exercised jointly by the counsellors of state or by such number of them as is specified in the letters patent under the Great Seal and subject to any other conditions within. However, there is a legal presumption that counsellors of state should act jointly, and consequently at least two are needed to act, with the absence of one possibly risking a legal challenge.

Counsellors of state are always the monarch's spouse and the first four people in the line of succession who meet the following specifications: they must be British subjects of full age (21 years, or 18 years for the heir apparent or presumptive) who are domiciled in the United Kingdom and not disqualified from becoming monarch. During a regency, the next four eligible people in the line of succession after the regent (and the regent's spouse) may be counsellors. A monarch may also request that Parliament add specific people to their counsellors of state. This was done by Queen Elizabeth II leading to section 3 of the Regency Act 1953 and by King Charles III leading to the Counsellors of State Act 2022.

== History ==
The first counsellors of state were appointed by George V under the royal prerogative in 1911 when he travelled to India for the Delhi Durbar, and they continued to be appointed under the prerogative for the rest of his reign. At first, senior politicians such as the Prime Minister and the Lord Chancellor could serve as counsellors of state, but later counsellors of state were exclusively members of the Royal Family. The Regency Act 1937 (1 Edw. 8 & 1 Geo. 6. c. 16) ultimately placed the appointment of counsellors of state on a statutory footing and codified the practice of restricting the role to senior members of the Royal Family.

Since the passage of the Regency Act 1937, the only persons to have been counsellors of state while not a queen consort, prince, or princess were George Lascelles, 7th Earl of Harewood, Alastair Windsor, 2nd Duke of Connaught and Strathearn (although Windsor had been a prince between 1914 and 1917 and never served in practice during his short tenure), and Maud Carnegie, Countess of Southesk (who was entitled to but did not use the style of princess). Prior to that, the Lord Chancellor, the Lord President of the Council, the prime minister, and the Archbishop of Canterbury had been appointed to the position by George V.

Queen Elizabeth the Queen Mother lost her eligibility to be a counsellor of state in 1952 upon the death of her husband, King George VI, until section 3 of the Regency Act 1953 restored her position. The provision was specific to her, rather than applying to dowagers generally.

In September 2022, The Daily Telegraph reported that King Charles III wanted the law to be amended to allow only working members of the royal family to serve as counsellors of state. This would take away the eligibility of family members who did not carry out official functions, while creating a possibility for spouses to senior ranking members and those with a lower position in the line of succession to be called upon and fulfil the role.

Questions were raised in the House of Lords in October 2022 by Lord Stansgate about the "suitability" of the Duke of York and Duke of Sussex being counsellors of state when the former had "left public life" and the latter had "left the country". It was subsequently reported that, instead of removing them from the list of counsellors of state, it was being proposed that the pool of counsellors be expanded in order to create a more flexible list of available royals to stand in for the King if needed. On 14 November 2022, the King sent a message to both Houses of Parliament, formally asking for a change in the law that would allow Princess Anne and Prince Edward to be added to the list of counsellors of state. The next day, a bill to that end was introduced in Parliament and it received royal assent on 6 December, coming into force on 7 December as the Counsellors of State Act 2022.

== List of current counsellors of state ==
As of 2026, those eligible to be appointed counsellors of state to King Charles III are:

Counsellor	Since	Relation to Monarch	Succession order	Change
Queen Camilla	8 September 2022	Spouse	—N/a	Accession to the throne of Charles III
William, Prince of Wales	21 June 2003	Son and heir apparent	1	Reached the age of 21
Prince Harry, Duke of Sussex	15 September 2005	Son	5	Reached the age of 21
Andrew Mountbatten-Windsor	19 February 1981	Brother	8	Reached the age of 21
Princess Beatrice	8 September 2022	Niece	9	Accession to the throne of Charles III
Prince Edward, Duke of Edinburgh	7 December 2022	Brother	16	Counsellors of State Act 2022
Anne, Princess Royal	7 December 2022	Sister	19	Counsellors of State Act 2022

Of these seven, Andrew, Prince Harry, and Princess Beatrice do not perform royal duties.

Andrew remains eligible to serve in this role, though he has withdrawn from most royal activities; this was provoked by a backlash due to the allegations of sexual abuse made against him and his long relationship with Jeffrey Epstein. In practice, only members of the royal family that perform public duties on behalf of the monarch would be appointed as counsellors of state, thus eliminating the possibility of Harry, Andrew or Beatrice serving in this role.

Should any of the above, other than Camilla, Edward or Anne, become ineligible or unable to serve, the next person eligible would be Princess Eugenie. Prince George is to automatically become a counsellor of state on his 21st birthday on 22 July 2034, and would replace Princess Beatrice (or his 18th birthday should he be the heir apparent at that time, and would replace Princess Eugenie).

== List of former counsellors of state ==
The following is a list of all the people who have been eligible to be a counsellor of state, listed in chronological order. A † indicates Counsellors who died whilst eligible:

=== George VI (11 December 1936 – 6 February 1952) ===
Counsellor	Period	Relation to Monarch	Change
Queen Elizabeth	19 March 1937 – 6 February 1952	Spouse	Passage of the Regency Act 1937
Prince Henry, Duke of Gloucester	19 March 1937 – 10 June 1974†	Brother	Passage of the Regency Act 1937
Prince George, Duke of Kent	19 March 1937 – 25 August 1942†	Brother	Passage of the Regency Act 1937
Mary, Princess Royal	19 March 1937 – 25 December 1957	Sister	Passage of the Regency Act 1937
Princess Arthur of Connaught, Duchess of Fife	19 March 1937 – 21 April 1944	Cousin	Passage of the Regency Act 1937
Alastair Windsor, Duke of Connaught and Strathearn; Never served	25 August 1942 – 26 April 1943†	First cousin once removed	Replaced Prince George, Duke of Kent upon his death
Princess Maud, Countess of Southesk	26 April 1943 – 7 February 1944	Cousin	Replaced Alastair Windsor, Duke of Connaught and Strathearn upon his death
George Lascelles, Viscount Lascelles (Earl of Harewood from 1947)	7 February 1944 – 21 August 1951	Nephew	Replaced Princess Maud, Countess of Southesk upon reaching the age of 21
Princess Elizabeth (Duchess of Edinburgh from 1947)	21 April 1944 – 6 February 1952	Daughter (Heir-presumptive)	Replaced Princess Arthur of Connaught, Duchess of Fife upon reaching the age of 18
Princess Margaret	21 August 1951 – 10 March 1985	Daughter	Replaced George Lascelles, Earl of Harewood upon reaching the age of 21
=== Elizabeth II (6 February 1952 – 8 September 2022) ===
Counsellor	Period	Relation to Monarch	Change
Prince Philip, Duke of Edinburgh	6 February 1952 – 9 April 2021†	Spouse	Accession to the throne of Elizabeth II
Princess Margaret (Countess of Snowdon from 1961)	21 August 1951 – 10 March 1985	Sister	Already eligible
Prince Henry, Duke of Gloucester	19 March 1937 – 10 June 1974†	Uncle	Already eligible
Mary, Princess Royal	19 March 1937 – 25 December 1957	Aunt	Already eligible
George Lascelles, Earl of Harewood	6 February 1952 – 9 October 1956	Cousin	Accession to the throne of Elizabeth II
Queen Elizabeth the Queen Mother	19 November 1953 (Note: Queen Elizabeth lost her position as counsellor of state when she was widowed. However, the Regency Act 1953 re-appointed her as a counsellor of state.) – 30 March 2002†	Mother	Passage of the Regency Act 1953
Prince Edward, Duke of Kent	9 October 1956 – 26 August 1965	Cousin	Replaced George Lascelles, Earl of Harewood upon reaching the age of 21
Princess Alexandra of Kent	25 December 1957 – 18 December 1962	Cousin	Replaced Mary, Princess Royal upon reaching the age of 21
Prince William of Gloucester	18 December 1962 – 15 August 1971	Cousin	Replaced Princess Alexandra of Kent upon reaching the age of 21
Prince Richard of Gloucester	26 August 1965 – 14 November 1966	Cousin	Replaced Prince Edward, Duke of Kent upon reaching the age of 21
Charles, Prince of Wales	14 November 1966 – 8 September 2022	Son and Heir-apparent	Replaced Prince Richard of Gloucester upon reaching the age of 18
Princess Anne (Princess Royal from 1987)	15 August 1971 – 21 June 2003 (Note: The Princess Royal lost her position as counsellor of state when Prince William reached the age of 21. However, the Counsellors of State Act 2022 re-appointed her as a counsellor of state to Charles III.)	Daughter	Replaced Prince William of Gloucester upon reaching the age of 21
Prince Richard, Duke of Gloucester	10 June 1974 – 19 February 1981	Cousin	Replaced Prince Henry, Duke of Gloucester upon his death
Prince Andrew (Duke of York 1986 – 2025)	19 February 1981 – 8 September 2022 (Note: Continued as a Counsellor of State to Charles III upon his accession)	Son	Replaced Prince Richard, Duke of Gloucester upon reaching the age of 21
Prince Edward (Earl of Wessex from 1999)	10 March 1985 – 15 September 2005 (Note: Prince Edward lost his position as counsellor of state when Prince Harry reached the age of 21. However, the Counsellors of State Act 2022 re-appointed him as a counsellor of state to Charles III.)	Son	Replaced Princess Margaret, Countess of Snowdon upon reaching the age of 21
Prince William (Duke of Cambridge from 2011)	21 June 2003 – 8 September 2022	Grandson	Replaced Anne, Princess Royal upon reaching the age of 21
Prince Harry (Duke of Sussex from 2018)	15 September 2005 – 8 September 2022	Grandson	Replaced Prince Edward, Earl of Wessex upon reaching the age of 21

== Bibliography ==
- Velde, François R. (2004). Regency Acts 1937 to 1953. Retrieved 2005.
