= The Greaze =

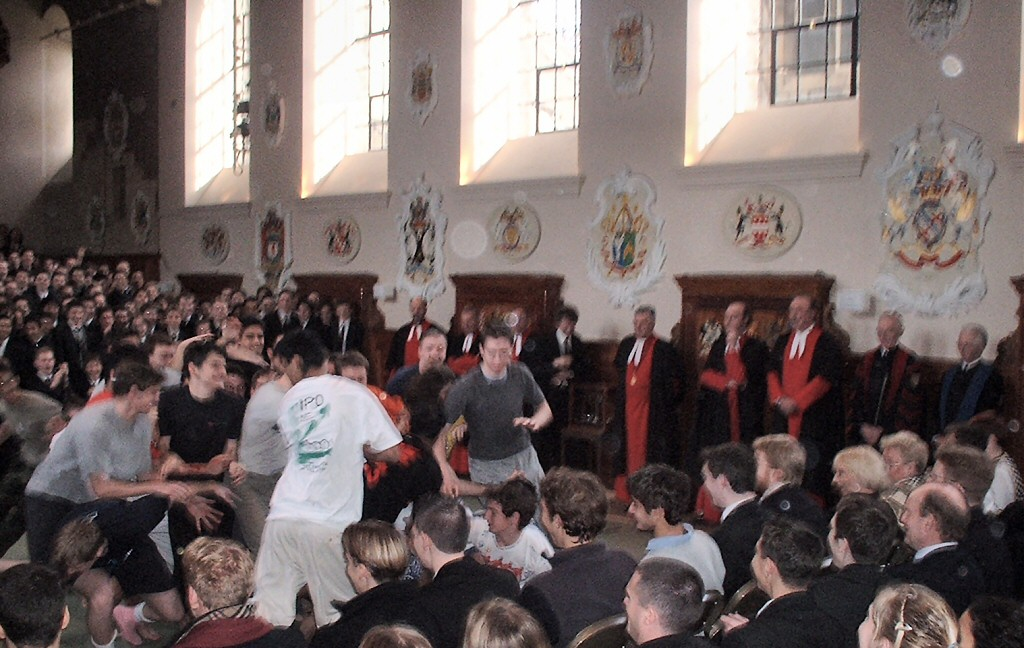
- The Greaze
- Status: Active
- Date: Shrove Tuesday since c1753
- Frequency: Annual
- Location: Westminster School Hall "Up School"
- Participants: Students at Westminster School
- Budget: One Gold Sovereign
- Major events: Pancake Toss
- Patron: Dean of Westminster
- People: Headmaster
- Website: https://www.westminster.org.uk

The Greaze (also known as the Pancake Greaze) is an annual pancake-toss and scramble tradition held "Up School" at Westminster School, London, on Shrove Tuesday. The event involves the ceremonial tossing of a large horsehair pancake over a high iron bar and a scramble by students to claim portions; the student who secures the largest portion by weight is awarded a prize. The Dean of Westminster traditionally petitions for a half-holiday (“a play”) following the event.

== History ==
The Greaze has been held "Up School" annually on Shrove Tuesday since at least 1753. It is mentioned by Jeremy Bentham, and William Hone quotes a 1790 reference.

The head cook ceremoniously tosses a pancake over a 20 foot high iron bar; members of the school fight for the pancake for up to one minute. The pupil who gets the largest weight is awarded a gold sovereign and the Dean "begs a Play" (a half day off school) for the whole School.

Michael Longford, author of the memoir "The Path that Led to Africa", describes winning The Greaze in 1943:

"I was the tallest boy in line so it [the pancake] landed squarely in my arms. The next two minutes were sheer torture. I was flat on my stomach with what seemed like a hundred hands clawing at me, and a mass of writhing bodies above me making breathing virtually impossible. When the judge's whistle blew...I was the winner of the Greaze, though it was entirely a matter of luck rather than skill."

Over the years, the precise rituals and practicalities have evolved, but the essential format has remained: the cook tosses the pancake, students scramble, judges weigh portions, and the winner is declared. Historically, a cook failing to lob the pancake over the bar might be “booked” or subjected to light teasing (formerly via being pelted with Latin primers), though that practice has since lapsed. Fancy dress is now common for participants.

== See also ==
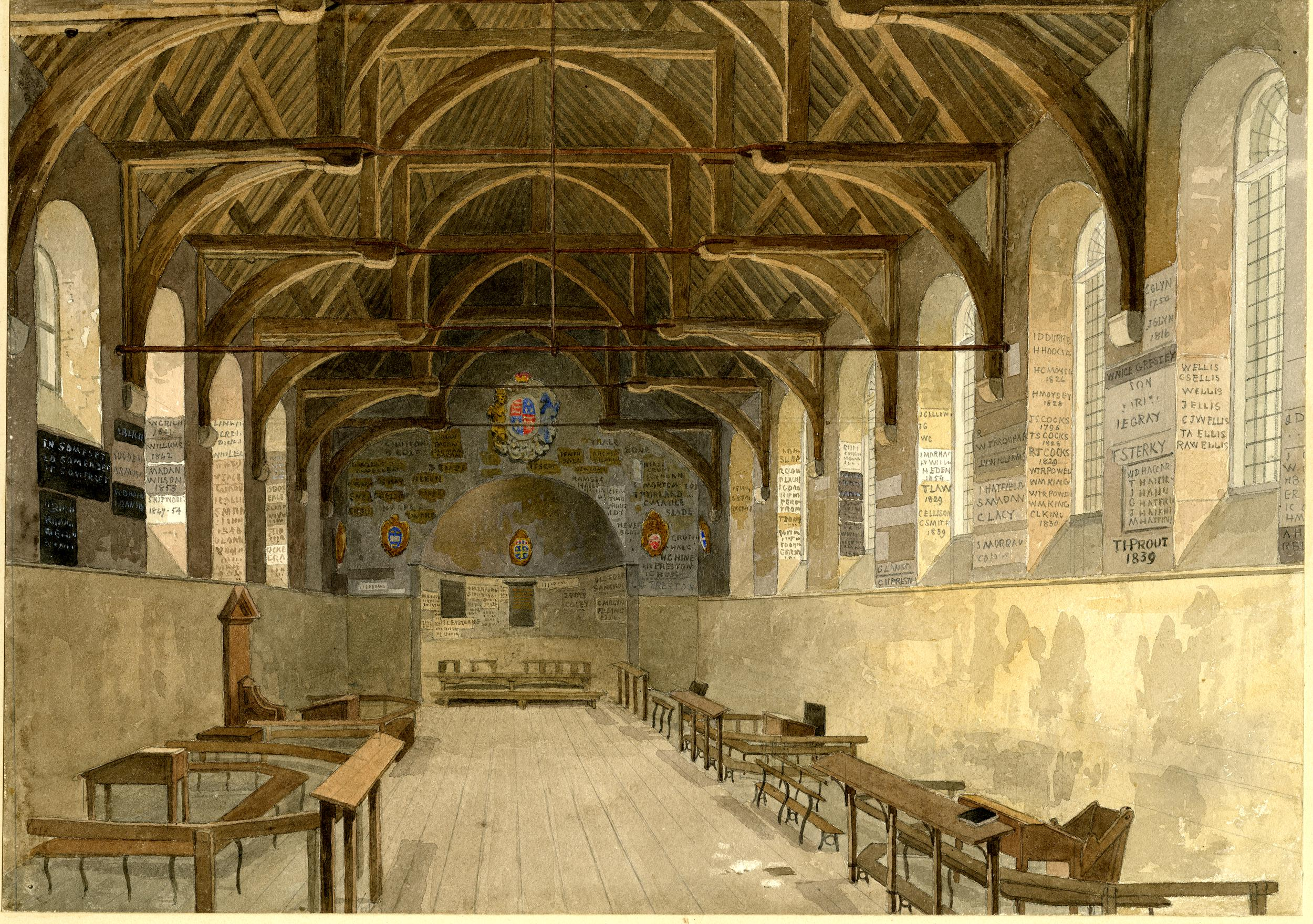
Westminster School Hall c1850

- Westminster School
- Westminster School Hall (Up School)
