= Regency Act 1705 =

Act of the Parliament of England

- Act of Parliament
- Parliament of England
- Long title: An Act for the better Security of Her Majesty's Person and Government, and of the Succession to the Crown of England in the Protestant Line.
- Citation: 4 & 5 Ann. c. 20 (Note: This is the citation in The Statutes of the Realm.); 4 Ann. c. 8 (Note: This is the citation in The Statutes at Large.)
- Territorial extent: England and Wales

Dates
- Royal assent: 19 March 1706
- Commencement: 25 October 1705 (Note: Section 1.)
- Repealed: 15 July 1867
Other legislation
Amends	Act of Settlement 1701
Amended by	Indemnity Act 1727
Repealed by	Statute Law Revision Act 1867
Relates to	Succession to the Crown Act 1707

Status: Repealed

Text of statute as originally enacted

The Regency Act 1705 (4 & 5 Ann. c. 20) was an act of the Parliament of England.

The act was passed at a time when Parliament was anxious to ensure that a Protestant succeeded to the throne on the death of Queen Anne. The act was conceived by the Whig Junto, mainly by John Somers, and seen through the House of Lords by Lord Wharton. Lord Cowper later claimed the act was designed "to put it [the succession] in such a method as was not to be resisted but by open force of arms and a public declaration for the Pretender".

The act required privy counsellors and other officers, in the event of Anne's death, to proclaim as her successor the next Protestant in the line of succession to the throne, and made it high treason to fail to do so. If the next Protestant successor was abroad at the death of Anne, seven great Officers of State named in the act (and others whom the heir-apparent thought fit to appoint), called "Lords Justices," would form a regency. The heir-apparent would name these others through a secret instrument which would be sent to England in three copies and delivered to the Hanoverian Resident, the Archbishop of Canterbury and the Lord Chancellor. The Lords Justices were to have the power to give royal assent to bills, except that they would be guilty of treason if they amended the Act of Uniformity 1662 (14 Cha. 2. c. 4).

The act also made it treason to say in writing than Anne was not the lawful queen, or that James the Pretender had any right to inherit the Crown. It was praemunire to say so in speech. The act also confirmed the clauses in the Parliament Act 1695 (7 & 8 Will. 3. c. 15) which stipulated that Parliament would continue to sit should the sovereign die "for and during the term of six months and no longer, unless the same be sooner prorogued or dissolved by such person to whom the Crown of this realm of Great Britain shall come".

The act received royal assent in March 1706, but came into force retrospectively from the beginning of that session of Parliament (hence it is dated 1705). Lord Halifax at the end of the session of Parliament was sent to Hanover to present a copy of the act to the heir apparent, Sophia, Electress of Hanover.

== Subsequent developments ==
The act was replaced only two years later by the Succession to the Crown Act 1707 (6 Ann. c. 41).

The whole act was repealed by section 1 of, and the schedule to, the Statute Law Revision Act 1867 (30 & 31 Vict. c. 59), which came into force on 15 July 1867.

== See also ==
- Correspondence with James the Pretender (High Treason) Act 1701
- Treason Act

== Bibliography ==
- Holmes, Geoffrey (1987). British Politics in the Age of Anne (Revised ed.). London: The Hambledon Press.
- Michael, Wolfgang (1936). England Under George I. The Beginnings of the Hanoverian Dynasty. London: Macmillan.
