= Act of Uniformity Amendment Act 1872 =

Act of the Parliament of the United Kingdom

Act of Uniformity Amendment Act 1872 (Note: Section 9.)
- Act of Parliament
- Parliament of the United Kingdom
- Long title: An Act for the Amendment of the Act of Uniformity.
- Citation: 35 & 36 Vict. c. 35
- Territorial extent: United Kingdom

Dates
- Royal assent: 18 July 1872
- Commencement: 18 July 1872 (Note: The Acts of Parliament (Commencement) Act 1793.)
- Repealed: 1 September 1975
Other legislation
Amends	Act of Uniformity 1662
Repealed by	Church of England (Worship and Doctrine) Measure 1974

Status: Repealed

Text of statute as originally enacted

The Act of Uniformity Amendment Act 1872 (35 & 36 Vict. c. 35), sometimes called the Shortened Services Act, was an act of the Parliament of the United Kingdom that amended some of the provisions of the English Act of Uniformity 1662 (14 Cha. 2. c. 4).

It allowed certain modifications

- a shortened form of Morning and Evening Prayer on week days
- on special occasions approved by the Ordinary special forms of service, provided that they contain nothing, except anthems or hymns, which did not form part of the Holy Scriptures or the 1662 Book of Common Prayer
- additional forms of service on Sundays and Holy-days in addition to the regular services, approved by the Ordinary
- the use of Morning Prayer, the Litany, and the Communion Service as separate services and in varying order
- sermons or lectures without the common prayers or services appointed by the Prayer Book

== Subsequent development ==
The whole act was repealed by section 6(3) of, and schedule 2 to, the Church of England (Worship and Doctrine) Measure 1974 (No. 3), which came into force on 1 September 1975.

== See also ==
- Prayer Book (Tables of Lessons) Act 1871
- Burial Laws Amendment Act 1880
