= Protestant Religion and Presbyterian Church Act 1707 =

Protestant Religion and Presbyterian Church Act 1707 (Note: The citation of this Act by this short title was authorised by section 2 of, and the second schedule to, the Statute Law Revision (Scotland) Act 1964. Due to the repeal of those provisions it is now authorised by section 19(2) of the Interpretation Act 1978.)
- Act of Parliament
- Parliament of Scotland
- Long title: Act for Securing the Protestant Religion and Presbyterian Church Government.
- Citation: 1707 c. 6 [12mo ed: c. 6]
- Territorial extent: Kingdom of Scotland

Dates
- Royal assent: 16 January 1707

Other legislation
- Relates to: Maintenance of Church of England Act 1706; Union with Scotland Act 1706; Succession to the Crown Act 1707; Lords Justices Act 1837; Regency Act 1840; Regency Act 1910; Regency Act 1937

Status: Current legislation

Revised text of statute as amended

Text of the Protestant Religion and Presbyterian Church Act 1707 as in force today (including any amendments) within the United Kingdom, from legislation.gov.uk.

Maintenance of Church of England Act 1706
- Act of Parliament
- Parliament of England
- Long title: An Act for securing the Church of England as by Law established.
- Citation: 6 Ann. c. 8 (Note: This is the citation in The Statutes of the Realm.); 5 Ann. c. 5 (Note: This is the citation in The Statutes at Large.)
- Territorial extent: England and Wales

Dates
- Royal assent: 13 February 1707
- Commencement: 3 December 1706 (Note: Start of session.)

Other legislation
- Amends: Act of Uniformity 1662
- Amended by: Statute Law Revision Act 1950; Statute Law (Repeals) Act 1973
- Relates to: Act of Uniformity 1662; Ordination of Ministers Act 1571; Union of England and Scotland Act 1704; Protestant Religion and Presbyterian Church Act 1707; Union with Scotland Act 1706; Succession to the Crown Act 1707; Regency Act 1937

Status: Amended

Text of statute as originally enacted

Revised text of statute as amended

Text of the Protestant Religion and Presbyterian Church Act 1707 as in force today (including any amendments) within the United Kingdom, from legislation.gov.uk.

The Protestant Religion and Presbyterian Church Act 1707 (c. 6) is an act of the pre-Union Parliament of Scotland which was passed to ensure that the status of the Church of Scotland would not be affected by the Union with England. Its long title is An Act for Securing the Protestant Religion and Presbyterian Church Government.

The act has the constitutional distinction of being named in the Regency Act 1937 (1 Edw. 8. & 1 Geo. 6. c. 16) as a statute that may not be amended during a regency. The Regency Act 1937 provides that a regent may not assent to a bill to amend the act, or any bill affecting the line of succession. When the Regency Bill was debated in the House of Commons, the attorney-general explained, "The safeguarding of this particular Act of the Scottish Parliament was expressly mentioned in the Act of Union, and that is the historic reason why it appears here."

An act of the Parliament of England, the Maintenance of Church of England Act 1706 (6 Ann. c. 8), had made similar provision for the Church of England in 1706 but is not mentioned in the Regency Act 1937.

== See also ==
- Succession to the Crown Act 1707
