= List of acts of the Parliament of England from 1663 =

This is a list of acts of the Parliament of England for the year 1663.

For acts passed during the period 1707–1800, see the list of acts of the Parliament of Great Britain. See also the list of acts of the Parliament of Scotland, and the list of acts of the Parliament of Ireland.

For acts passed from 1801 onwards, see the list of acts of the Parliament of the United Kingdom. For acts of the devolved parliaments and assemblies in the United Kingdom, see the list of acts of the Scottish Parliament, the list of acts of the Northern Ireland Assembly, and the list of acts and measures of Senedd Cymru; see also the list of acts of the Parliament of Northern Ireland.

For medieval statutes, etc. that are not considered to be acts of Parliament, see the list of English statutes.

See also the List of ordinances and acts of the Parliament of England, 1642–1660 for ordinances and acts passed by the Long Parliament and other bodies without royal assent, and which were not considered to be valid legislation following the Restoration in 1660.

The number shown after each act's title is its chapter number. Acts are cited using this number, preceded by the years of the reign during which the relevant parliamentary session was held; thus the Union with Ireland Act 1800 is cited as "39 & 40 Geo. 3. c. 67", meaning the 67th act passed during the session that started in the 39th year of the reign of George III and which finished in the 40th year of that reign. The modern convention is to use Arabic numerals in citations (thus "41 Geo. 3" rather than "41 Geo. III"). Acts of the last session of the Parliament of Great Britain and the first session of the Parliament of the United Kingdom are both cited as "41 Geo. 3".

Acts passed by the Parliament of England did not have a short title; however, some of these acts have subsequently been given a short title by acts of the Parliament of the United Kingdom, such as the Short Titles Act 1896 (59 & 60 Vict. c. 14).

Acts passed by the Parliament of England were deemed to have come into effect on the first day of the session in which they were passed. Because of this, the years given in the list below may in fact be the year before a particular act was passed.

== 15 Cha. 2 ==
The second session of the 2nd Parliament of King Charles II (the 'Cavalier Parliament') which met from 18 February 1663 until 27 July 1663.

This session was traditionally cited as 15 Car. 2, 15 Chas. 2 or 15 C. 2; it is listed in the "Chronological Table of the Statutes" as 15 Cha. 2.

=== Public acts ===
Short title	Citation	Royal assent
Long title
Road Repair (Hertfordshire, Cambridgeshire, and Huntingdonshire) Act 1663 or the Highways Act 1663 (repealed)	15 Cha. 2. c. 1 (Note: Also listed as 15 Cha. 2. c. 14 Pr.)	3 June 1663
An Act for repairing the Highwayes within the Countyes of Hertford Cambridge and Huntington. (Repealed by Hertfordshire Roads Act 1732 (6 Geo. 2. c. 24) and Statute Law Revision Act 1948 (11 & 12 Geo. 6. c. 62))
Destruction of Trees Act 1663 (repealed)	15 Cha. 2. c. 2	3 June 1663
An Act for the Punishment of unlawfull cutting or stealing or spoiling of Wood and Underwood and Destroyers of young Timber Trees. (Repealed for England and Wales by Criminal Statutes Repeal Act 1827 (7 & 8 Geo. 4. c. 27) and for India by Criminal Law (India) Act 1828 (9 Geo. 4. c. 74))
Taxation Act 1663 (repealed)	15 Cha. 2. c. 3	27 July 1663
An Act to explaine and supply a former Act for destribution of Threescore thousand Pounds amongst the truely loyall and indigent Commission Officers; and for assessing of Offices, and destributing the moneyes thereby raised for their further supply. (Repealed by Statute Law Revision Act 1863 (26 & 27 Vict. c. 125))
Better Ordering the Forces Act 1663 (repealed)	15 Cha. 2. c. 4	27 July 1663
An Additional Act for the better ordering the Forces in the severall Counties of this Kingdome. (Repealed by Territorial Army and Militia Act 1921 (11 & 12 Geo. 5. c. 37))
Select Vestries Act 1663 (repealed)	15 Cha. 2. c. 5	27 July 1663
An Act for regulating Select Vestryes. (Repealed by Statute Law Revision Act 1863 (26 & 27 Vict. c. 125))
Act of Uniformity (Explanation) Act 1663 (repealed)	15 Cha. 2. c. 6	27 July 1663
An Act for Releife of such Persons as by Sicknes or other Impediment were disabled from subscribeing the Declaration in the Act of Uniformity and Explanation of part of the said Act. (Repealed by Statute Law Revision Act 1863 (26 & 27 Vict. c. 125), Statute Law Revision Act 1888 (51 & 52 Vict. c. 3) and Statute Law (Repeals) Act 1969 (c. 52))
Encouragement of Trade Act 1663 or the Navigation Act 1663 or the Staple Act 1663 (repealed)	15 Cha. 2. c. 7	27 July 1663
An Act for the Encouragement of Trade. (Repealed by Finance (1909-10) Act 1910 (10 Edw. 7 & 1 Geo. 5. c. 8))
Butchers Act 1663 (repealed)	15 Cha. 2. c. 8	27 July 1663
An Act to prevent the selling of live fatt Catle by Butchers. (Repealed by Repeal of Certain Laws Act 1772 (12 Geo. 3. c. 71))
Taxation (No. 2) Act 1663 (repealed)	15 Cha. 2. c. 9	27 July 1663
An Act for granting Fower intire Subsidies to His Majestie by the Temporaltie. (Repealed by Statute Law Revision Act 1863 (26 & 27 Vict. c. 125))
Taxation (No. 3) Act 1663 (repealed)	15 Cha. 2. c. 10	27 July 1663
An Act for confirming of Fower Subsidyes granted by the Clergy. (Repealed by Statute Law Revision Act 1863 (26 & 27 Vict. c. 125))
Excise Act 1663 (repealed)	15 Cha. 2. c. 11	27 July 1663
An Additionall Act for the better ordering and collecting the Duty of Excise and preventing the Abuses therein. (Repealed by Statute Law Revision Act 1863 (26 & 27 Vict. c. 125))
Excise (Arrears) Act 1663 (repealed)	15 Cha. 2. c. 12	27 July 1663
An Explanatory Act for Recovery of the Arreares of Excise. (Repealed by Statute Law Revision Act 1863 (26 & 27 Vict. c. 125))
Hearth Money Act 1663 (repealed)	15 Cha. 2. c. 13	27 July 1663
An Additionall Act for the better ordering and collecting the Revenue ariseing by Hearth Money. (Repealed by Hearth Money Act 1688 (1 Will. & Mar. c. 10))
Settlement on Duke of York Act 1663 (repealed)	15 Cha. 2. c. 14 (Note: Also listed as 15 Cha. 2. c. 1 Pr.)	27 July 1663
An Act for setling the Proffitts of the Post Office and Power of graunting Wyne Lycences on his Royall Highnes the Duke of Yorke and the Heires Males of his Body. (Repealed by Statute Law Revision Act 1863 (26 & 27 Vict. c. 125))
Linen Cloth Act 1663 (repealed)	15 Cha. 2. c. 15	27 July 1663
An Act for encourageing the Manufactures of makeing Linen Cloath and Tapistry. (Repealed by Statute Law Revision Act 1863 (26 & 27 Vict. c. 125))
Fisheries, etc. Act 1663 (repealed)	15 Cha. 2. c. 16	27 July 1663
An Act for regulateing the Herring and other Fisheries, and for repeale of the Act concerning Madder. (Repealed by Statute Law Revision Act 1863 (26 & 27 Vict. c. 125))
Bedford Level Act 1663 or the General Drainage Act 1663	15 Cha. 2. c. 17 (Note: Also listed as 15 Cha. 2. c. 9 Pr.)	27 July 1663
An Act for settling the dreyning of the Great Levell of the Fenns called Bedford Levell.

=== Private acts ===
Short title	Citation	Royal assent
Long title
Settlement on Duke of York Act 1663 (repealed)	15 Cha. 2. c. 1 Pr. (Note: Also listed as 15 Cha. 2. c. 14.)	27 July 1663
An Act for setling the Proffitts of the Post Office and Power of graunting Wyne Lycences on his Royall Highnes the Duke of Yorke and the Heires Males of his Body. (Repealed by the Statute Law Revision Act 1863 (26 & 27 Vict. c. 125))
Estates of Earl of Kent and Lord Lucas: settling of lands on marriage of the Earl of Kent with the daughter and heir apparent of Lord Lucas.	15 Cha. 2. c. 2 Pr.	27 July 1663
An Act for the settling of the Lands of the Earl of Kent and the Lord Lucas, on the Marriage of the said Earl with the Daughter and Heir Apparent of the Lord Lucas.
Free school in Witney (Oxfordshire): endowment and erection by Henry Box.	15 Cha. 2. c. 3 Pr.	27 July 1663
An Act for settling of a Free School in Witney, in the County of Oxon, being erected and endowed by Henry Box, Citizen and Grocer of London, deceased.
Enabling the Bishop of Winchester to lease out tenements built on the site of his mansion house in St Saviour's parish Southwark (Surrey) and two parks and other desmenses at Bishops Waltham, and other lands, in Hampshire.	15 Cha. 2. c. 4 Pr.	27 July 1663
An Act to enable the Bishop of Winchester to lease out the Tenements now built upon the Site of his Mansion-house, in the Parish of St. Saviour's, in Southwarke, in the County of Surrey, and the Two Parks and other Demesnes at Bishop's Waltham, and other Lands in the County of South'ton.
Wells Harbour and Quay Act 1663 (repealed)	15 Cha. 2. c. 5 Pr.	27 July 1663
An Act for the repairing and better preserving the Key at the Port of Wells, in the County of Norfolke. (Repealed by the Wells Harbour and Quay Act 1835 (5 & 6 Will. 4. c. xlviii))
St. Oswald's Hospital, Worcestershire Act 1663	15 Cha. 2. c. 6 Pr.	27 July 1663
An Act for the governing the Hospital of St. Oswald, in the County of Worcester.
John Robinson's Estate Act 1663	15 Cha. 2. c. 7 Pr.	27 July 1663
An Act to enable Sir Francis Boynton Baronet and Richard Robinson Esquire to sell certain Lands of John Robinson Esquire, for Payment of Debts; and leasing of other Lands, for making Provision for his Younger Children.
Making void certain conveyances made by Caril Lord Mollineux.	15 Cha. 2. c. 8 Pr.	27 July 1663
An Act for making void certain Conveyances made by Carryl Lord Mollineux in the late Times.
Bedford Level Act 1663 or the General Drainage Act 1663	15 Cha. 2. c. 9 Pr. (Note: Also listed as 15 Cha. 2. c. 17.)	27 July 1663
An Act for settling the dreyning of the Great Levell of the Fenns called Bedford Levell.
Confirmation of Charles Pitcarne's deed.	15 Cha. 2. c. 10 Pr.	27 July 1663
An Act to confirm a Deed made by Charles Pittcarne Esquire.
Naturalization of Dame Elizabeth Jacob and others.	15 Cha. 2. c. 11 Pr.	27 July 1663
An Act for the Naturalization of Dame Elizabeth Jacob and others.
Naturalization of George Willoughby and others.	15 Cha. 2. c. 12 Pr.	27 July 1663
An Act for the naturalizing of George Willoughby and others
Confirmation of an Act naturalizing Peter and John de la Pierre or Peters.	15 Cha. 2. c. 13 Pr.	27 July 1663
An Act for confirming an Act (Note: Naturalization of Peter and John de la Pierre or Peters Act 1660 (12 Cha. 2. c. 1 Pr.)) for naturalizing of Pieter de la Pierre, alias Peters, and John de la Pierre, alias Peters.
Road Repair (Hertfordshire, Cambridgeshire, and Huntingdonshire) Act 1663 (repealed)	15 Cha. 2. c. 14 Pr. (Note: Also listed as 15 Cha. 2. c. 1.)	3 June 1663
An Act for repairing the Highwayes within the Countyes of Hertford Cambridge and Huntington. (Repealed by the Statute Law Revision Act 1948 (11 & 12 Geo. 6. c. 62))
To enable Edward, Marquis of Worcester, to receive the benefit of a water commanding engine invented by him, a tenth part of which is appropriated for the King's Majesty, his heirs and successors.	15 Cha. 2. c. 15 Pr.	3 June 1663
An Act to enable Edward Marquis of Worcester to receive the Benefit and Profit of a Water-commanding Engine by him invented, One Tenth Part whereof is appropriated for the Benefit of the King's Majesty, His Heirs and Successors.
Settlement of an annuity of £300 per year upon Charles Earl of Portland, and for the benefit of Willoughby Whitelocke, Bulstrode Whitelocke and Carleton Whitelocke infants and for confirming agreements made to compose lawsuits against them.	15 Cha. 2. c. 16 Pr.	3 June 1663
An Act for settling an Annuity of Three Hundred Pounds per Annum upon Charles Earl of Portland, and for the Benefit of Willoughby Whitlock, Bulstrode Whitlock, and Carlton Whitlock, Infants; and for confirming of Agreements made to compose Suits in Law against them.
Settling the charitable gift of John Guest.	15 Cha. 2. c. 17 Pr.	3 June 1663
An Act for settling the Charitable Gift of John Guest.
Sir John Packington's Estate Act 1663	15 Cha. 2. c. 18 Pr.	3 June 1663
An Act to enable Sir John Packington and his Trustees to sell, or otherwise dispose of, certain Lands, for the Payment of his Debts, and raising Portions for his Younger Children.
Enabling Edward Chaloner to make provision for his wife Anne and his younger children.	15 Cha. 2. c. 19 Pr.	3 June 1663
An Act to enable Edward Chaloner Esquire to make Provision for Anne his Wife, and his Younger Children.
Naturalization of Charlotte Hessen Killigrew and others.	15 Cha. 2. c. 20 Pr.	3 June 1663
An Act for the naturalizing of Charlottee Hessen Killigrew and others.
Empowering Sir John Drake and others to sell lands for payment of the portion of Ellen Briscoe.	15 Cha. 2. c. 21 Pr.	3 June 1663
An Act to empower Sir John Drake and others to make Sale of Lands, for Payment of the Portion of Ellen Briscoe Widow.
Richard and Anthony Senior's Estate Act 1663	15 Cha. 2. c. 22 Pr.	3 June 1663
An Act to enable the Sale of some of the Lands of Richard Senior and Anthony Senior, deceased, for Payment of some of their Debts.

=== Sources ===
- Raithby, John, ed. (1963) [1819]. "15° Car. II.". Statutes of the Realm. Vol. 5: The Statutes of King Charles I and King Charles II (1625–1680). London: Dawsons. pp. 436–512 – via HathiTrust.
- Raithby, John, ed. (1819). Statutes of the Realm. Vol. 5: 1628-80 – via British History Online.
- Pickering, Danby, ed. (1763). "Anno decimo quinto Caroli II". The Statutes at Large. Vol. 8: From the Twelfth Year of King Charles II to the Last Year of King James II. Inclusive. Cambridge: Joseph Bentham. pp. 148–205 – via Internet Archive.
- Journals of the House of Commons. Vol. 8. London: His Majesty's Stationery Office. 1803. pp. 436–534.
- Journal of the House of Lords. Vol. 11: 1660-1666. London: His Majesty's Stationery Office. 1830. pp. 478–580 – via British History Online.
- Chronological Table of and Index to the Statutes. Vol. 1: To the End of the Session 59 Vict. Sess. 2 (1895) (13th ed.). London: Her Majesty's Stationery Office. 1896. p. 70 – via Google Books.
- Chronological Table of the Statutes: Covering the Period from 1235 to the End of 1971. London: Her Majesty's Stationery Office. 1972. p. 68. ISBN 978-0-11-840096-1 – via Google Books.
- "Chronological Tables of the Private and Personal Acts: Part 3 (1660–1680)". legislation.gov.uk. The National Archives.

== See also ==
- List of acts of the Parliament of England
