= Act of Uniformity (Explanation) Act 1663 =

Act of the Parliament of England relating to religion and the Church of England

Act of Uniformity (Explanation) Act 1663 (Note: The citation of this act by this short title was authorised by section 5 of, and the second schedule to, the Statute Law Revision Act 1948. Due to the repeal of those provisions, it is now authorised by section 19(2) of the Interpretation Act 1978.)
- Act of Parliament
- Parliament of England
- Long title: An Act for Releife of such Persons as by Sicknes or other Impediment were disabled from subscribeing the Declaration in the Act of Uniformity and Explanation of part of the said Act. (Note: These words are printed against this act in the second column of the second schedule to the Statute Law Revision Act 1948, which is headed "Title".)
- Citation: 15 Cha. 2. c. 6
- Territorial extent: England and Wales

Dates
- Royal assent: 27 July 1663
- Commencement: 18 February 1663 (Note: Section 2.)
- Repealed: 1 January 1970
Other legislation
Repealed by	Statute Law Revision Act 1863; Statute Law Revision Act 1888; Statute Law (Repeals) Act 1969
Relates to	Act of Uniformity 1662

Status: Repealed

Text of statute as originally enacted

The Act of Uniformity (Explanation) Act 1663 (15 Cha. 2. c. 6) was an act of the Parliament of England.

== Subsequent developments ==
The whole act, except section 4 (which is section 5 in Ruffhead's Edition) and the last section, were repealed by section 1 of, and the schedule to, the Statute Law Revision Act 1863 (26 & 27 Vict. c. 125), which came into force on 28 July 1863.

Section 4, from "be it" to "aforesaid that" was repealed by section 1(1) of, and part I of the schedule to, the Statute Law Revision Act 1888 (51 & 52 Vict. c. 3), which came into force on 27 March 1888.

The whole act, so far as unrepealed, was repealed by section 1 of, and part II of the schedule to, the Statute Law (Repeals) Act 1969, which came into force on 1 January 1970.

== See also ==
- Act of Uniformity 1662
