= Meeting of Parliament Act 1797 =

Act of the Parliament of Great Britain

Meeting of Parliament Act 1797 (Note: The citation of this act by this short title was authorised by section 1 of, and the first schedule to, the Short Titles Act 1896. Due to the repeal of those provisions it is now authorised by section 19(2) of the Interpretation Act 1978.)
- Act of Parliament
- Parliament of Great Britain
- Long title: An Act to shorten the Time now required for giving Notice of the Royal Intention of his Majesty, his Heirs and Successors, that the Parliament shall meet and be holden for the Dispatch of Business, and more effectually to provide for the Meeting of Parliament in the case of a Demise of the Crown.
- Citation: 37 Geo. 3. c. 127
- Territorial extent: Great Britain

Dates
- Royal assent: 19 July 1797
- Commencement: 19 July 1797 (Note: The Acts of Parliament (Commencement) Act 1793.)
Other legislation
Amends	Succession to the Crown Act 1707
Amended by	Statute Law Revision Act 1871; Statute Law Revision Act 1888; Parliament (Elections and Meeting) Act 1943; Representation of the People Act 1985

Status: Amended

Text of statute as originally enacted

Revised text of statute as amended

Text of the Meeting of Parliament Act 1797 as in force today (including any amendments) within the United Kingdom, from legislation.gov.uk.

The Meeting of Parliament Act 1797 (37 Geo. 3. c. 127) is an act of the Parliament of Great Britain passed in 1797.

Section 1 of the act originally established that Parliament could be summoned fourteen days after the issuing of a proclamation recalling it to meet, notwithstanding any prorogation or law that would have stopped Parliament meeting earlier than this. This was amended by the Parliament (Elections and Meeting) Act 1943 (6 & 7 Geo. 6. c. 48) and now refers to any day after the date of the proclamation. The rest of the act has been repealed.

== Repealed sections ==
Section 3 of the act enacted that in case of the demise of the monarch after one parliament had been dissolved, but before the day indicated by the writ of summons for electing a new parliament, then the previous parliament (i.e. that which had been dissolved) was to be recalled immediately to Westminster. It would there sit as a parliament for the next six months, to all intents and purposes as though it had not been previously dissolved; it could, however, be dissolved or prorogued at any point during this time by the new monarch. A new writ would be issued, and the election would take place. This replaced the less detailed section 6 of the Succession to the Crown Act 1707 (6 Ann. c. 41).

Section 5 of the act provided that if the monarch died after the date of the election, then the newly elected parliament would meet as normal.

== See also ==
- Parliament Act 1911
- Prorogation Act 1867
- Representation of the People Act 1918
- Succession to the Crown Act 1707

== Bibliography ==
- Costin, W. C. and Watson, Steven J. (ed.). The Law & Working of the Constitution: Documents 1660-1914. A & C Black, 1952. Vol. II (1784-1914), p. 16.
