= Act of Uniformity 1662 =

Act of the Parliament of England concerning law of religion and the Church of England

Act of Uniformity 1662 (Note: The citation of this act by this short title was authorised by section 5 of, and the second schedule to, the Statute Law Revision Act 1948. Due to the repeal of those provisions, it is now authorised by section 19(2) of the Interpretation Act 1978.)
- Act of Parliament
- Parliament of England
- Long title: An Act for the Uniformity of Publique Prayers and Administracion of Sacramentes & other Rites & Ceremonies and for establishing the Form of making ordaining and consecrating Bishops Preists and Deacons in the Church of England. (Note: These words are printed against this act in the second column of the second schedule to the Statute Law Revision Act 1948, which is headed "Title".)
- Citation: 14 Cha. 2. c. 4 (Note: This is the citation in The Statutes of the Realm.); 13 & 14 Cha. 2. c. 4 (Note: This is the citation in The Statutes at Large.)
- Territorial extent: England and Wales; Ireland

Dates
- Royal assent: 19 May 1662
- Commencement: 7 January 1662 (Note: Start of session.)
- Repealed: Northern Ireland: 23 May 1950
Other legislation
| Amended by | Maintenance of Church of England Act 1706; Schism Act 1714; Uniformity of Worship Act 1749; Roman Catholics Act 1844; Religious Disabilities Act 1846; Clerical Subscription Act 1865; Statute Law Revision Act 1863; Universities Tests Act 1871; Promissory Oaths Act 1871; Act of Uniformity Amendment Act 1872; Statute Law Revision Act 1888; Statute Law Revision Act 1948; Statute Law Revision Act 1950; Statute Law (Repeals) Act 1969; Statute Law (Repeals) Act 1973; Church of England (Worship and Doctrine) Measure 1974; Church of England (Ecumenical Relations) Measure 1988; Church of England (Miscellaneous Provisions) Measure 1992; Cathedrals Measure 2021; Church of England (Miscellaneous Provisions) Measure 2024 |
| Repealed by | Northern Ireland: Statute Law Revision Act 1950 |
| Relates to | Act of Uniformity (Explanation) Act 1663; Conventicle Act 1664; Maintenance of Church of England Act 1706; Lords Justices Act 1837; Regency Act 1840 |

Status: Partially repealed

Text of statute as originally enacted

Revised text of statute as amended

Text of the Act of Uniformity 1662 as in force today (including any amendments) within the United Kingdom, from legislation.gov.uk.

The Act of Uniformity 1662 (14 Cha. 2. c. 4) is an act of the Parliament of England. (It was formerly cited as 13 & 14 Cha. 2. c. 4, by reference to the regnal year when it was passed on 19 May 1662.) It prescribed the form of public prayers, administration of sacraments, and other rites of the Established Church of England, according to the rites and ceremonies prescribed in the 1662 Book of Common Prayer. Adherence to this was required in order to hold any office in government or the church, although the new version of the Book of Common Prayer prescribed by the act was so new that most people had never even seen a copy. The Act also required that the Book of Common Prayer "be truly and exactly Translated into the British or Welsh Tongue". It also explicitly required episcopal ordination for all ministers, i.e. deacons, priests and bishops, which had to be reintroduced since the Puritans had abolished many features of the Church during the Civil War. The act did not explicitly encompass the Isle of Man.

The act has mostly been repealed in the United Kingdom, except for sections 10 and 15 which have nevertheless been superseded by other legislation in the provinces of Canterbury and York except in the Channel Islands and the Isle of Man.

== Great Ejection ==
As an immediate result of the act, over 2,000 clergymen refused to take the oath and were expelled from the Church of England in what became known as the Great Ejection of 1662. Although there had already been ministers outside the established church, this created the concept of non-conformity, with a substantial section of English society excluded from public affairs for a century and a half.

== Clarendon Code ==
The Act of Uniformity itself is one of four crucial pieces of legislation, known as the Clarendon Code, named after Edward Hyde, Earl of Clarendon, Charles II's Lord Chancellor. They are:

- The Corporation Act 1661 (13 Cha. 2 St. 2. c. 1) – This first of the four statutes which made up the Clarendon Code required all municipal officials to take Anglican communion, and formally reject the Solemn League and Covenant of 1643. The effect of this act was to exclude nonconformists from public office. This legislation was rescinded in 1828.
- The Act of Uniformity 1662 – This second statute made use of the Book of Common Prayer compulsory in religious service. Upwards of 2000 clergy refused to comply with this act, and were forced to resign their livings.
- The Conventicle Act 1664 (16 Cha. 2. c. 4) – This act forbade conventicles (a meeting for unauthorized worship) of more than 5 people who were not members of the same household. The purpose was to prevent dissenting religious groups from meeting.
- The Five Mile Act 1665 – This final act of the Clarendon Code was aimed at Nonconformist ministers, who were forbidden from coming within five miles of incorporated towns or the place of their former livings. They were also forbidden to teach in schools. This act was not rescinded until 1812.

Combined with the Test Act, the Corporation Acts excluded all nonconformists from holding civil or military office, and prevented them from being awarded degrees by the universities of Cambridge and Oxford.

== Book of Common Prayer ==
The Book of Common Prayer introduced by Charles II was substantially the same as Elizabeth's version of 1559, itself based on Thomas Cranmer's earlier version of 1552. Apart from minor changes this remains the official and permanent legal version of prayer authorised by Parliament and Church.

== Subsequent developments ==
Sections 9 and 27 of the act were repealed by section 1 of, and the schedule to, the Statute Law Revision Act 1863 (26 & 27 Vict. c. 125), which came into force on 28 July 1863.

Section 6, so far as unrepealed, section 8, and section 13 of the act, "except so far as it relates to the colleges of Westminster, Winchester, and Eton, or any governor or head thereof", was repealed by section 8 of, and the schedule to, the Universities Tests Act 1871 (34 & 35 Vict. c. 26), which came into force on 16 June 1871.

Section 7 of the act from the words "that it is not lawful" down to the words "commissionated by him and." were repealed by section 1 of, and part II of schedule one to, the Promissory Oaths Act 1871 (34 & 35 Vict. c. 48), which came into force on 13 July 1871.

The whole act was repealed for Northern Ireland by section 1(1) of, and the first schedule to, the Statute Law Revision Act 1950 (14 Geo. 6. c. 6), which came into force on 23 May 1950.

The following enactments, so far as unrepealed, were repealed by section 1 of, and part II of the schedule to, the Statute Law (Repeals) Act 1969, which came into force on 1 January 1970.

- Sections 2 and 3.
- In section 10 the words from " upon pain " onwards.
- Section 17.
- In section 20 the words " and statutes of this realm " and the words "have beene formerly made and ".

In section 5, the words from " upon pain " onwards, section 11, in section 13, the words from " the present governour " to " and two and ", and sections 22 and 23 of the act were repealed by section 1(1) of, and part III of schedule 1 to, the Statute Law (Repeals) Act 1973, which came into force on 18 July 1973.

The provisions of the act were modified by the Act of Uniformity Amendment Act 1872 (35 & 36 Vict. c. 35) to permit shortened forms of service. (This has been repealed by the General Synod.)

== See also ==
- Act of Uniformity
- Conformist
- Nonconformist
- Puritan's Pit
- Religion in the United Kingdom
- Savoy Conference
