= Nonconformist (Protestantism) =

Protestant Christians in Wales and England who did not follow the Church of England

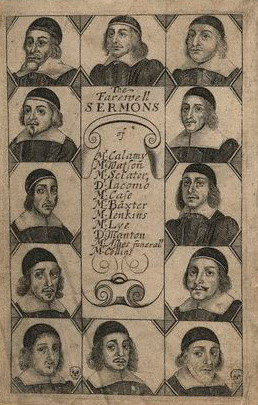
Title page of a collection of Farewell Sermons preached by Nonconformist ministers ejected from their parishes in 1662

Nonconformists are Protestant Christians who do not "conform" to the governance and usages of the established church in England, and in Wales until 1914, the Church of England.

Use of the term Nonconformist in England and Wales was precipitated by the Restoration of the Stuart monarchy in 1660, when the Act of Uniformity 1662 renewed opposition to reforms within the established church. By the late 19th century the term specifically included other Reformed Christians (English Presbyterians and Congregationalists), plus the Baptists, Brethren, Methodists, and Quakers. English Dissenters, such as the Puritans, who violated the Act of Uniformity 1558 – typically by practising radical, sometimes separatist, dissent – were labelled as Nonconformists.

In Ireland, the comparable term until the disestablishment of the Church of Ireland in 1869 was Dissenter (the term earlier used in England), typically a reference to Irish Presbyterians who refused, or dissented from, the approved Anglican communion.

By law and social custom, Nonconformists in England and Wales, and Dissenters in Ireland, were restricted from many spheres of public life – not least, from access to public office, civil service careers, or degrees at university – and were referred to as suffering from civil disabilities. In England and Wales in the late 19th century the new terms "free church" and "Free churchman" (or "Free church person") started to replace Nonconformist or Dissenter. The concept of Nonconformism does not encompass Jews, Catholics, atheists, or other non-Protestant groups, though those groups were often subject to civil disabilities apart from the regulation of Nonconformists.

One influential Nonconformist minister was Matthew Henry, who beginning in 1710 published his multi-volume biblical commentary that is still used and available in the 21st century. Isaac Watts is an equally recognised Nonconformist minister whose hymns are still sung by Christians worldwide.

The term can also be applied more broadly to describe Christians who do not belong as communicants to a country's majority national church, such as the Evangelical Lutheran Church of Sweden.

== England ==
=== Origins ===
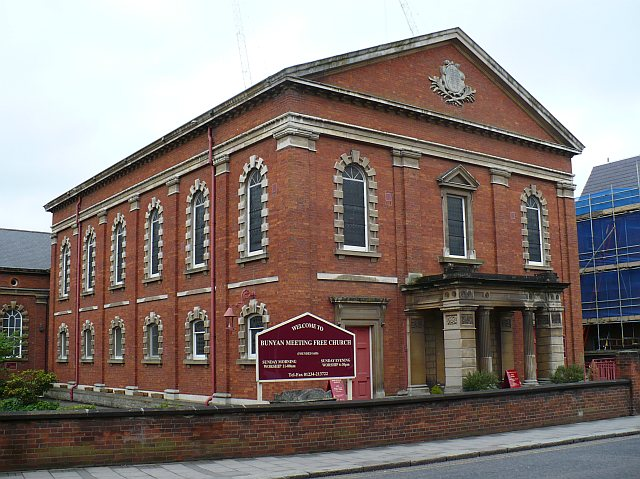
Bunyan Meeting Free Church, a Nonconformist chapel in Bedford. Dissenter John Bunyan purchased a barn in 1672 for a meeting place. A meeting house replaced it in 1707 and this chapel was built in 1850.

The Act of Uniformity 1662 required churchmen to use all rites and ceremonies as prescribed in the Book of Common Prayer. It also required episcopal ordination of all ministers of the Church of England – a pronouncement most odious to the Puritans, the faction of the church which had come to dominance during the English Civil War and the Interregnum. Consequently, nearly 2,000 clergy were "ejected" from the established church for refusing to comply with the provisions of the act, an event referred to as the Great Ejection. The Great Ejection created an abiding public consciousness of nonconformity.

Thereafter, a Nonconformist was any English subject belonging to a non-Anglican church or a non-Christian religion. More broadly, any person who advocated religious liberty was typically called out as Nonconformist. The strict religious tests embodied in the laws of the Clarendon Code and other penal laws excluded a substantial section of English society from public affairs and benefits, including certification of university degrees, for well more than a century and a half. Culturally, in England and Wales, discrimination against Nonconformists endured even longer.

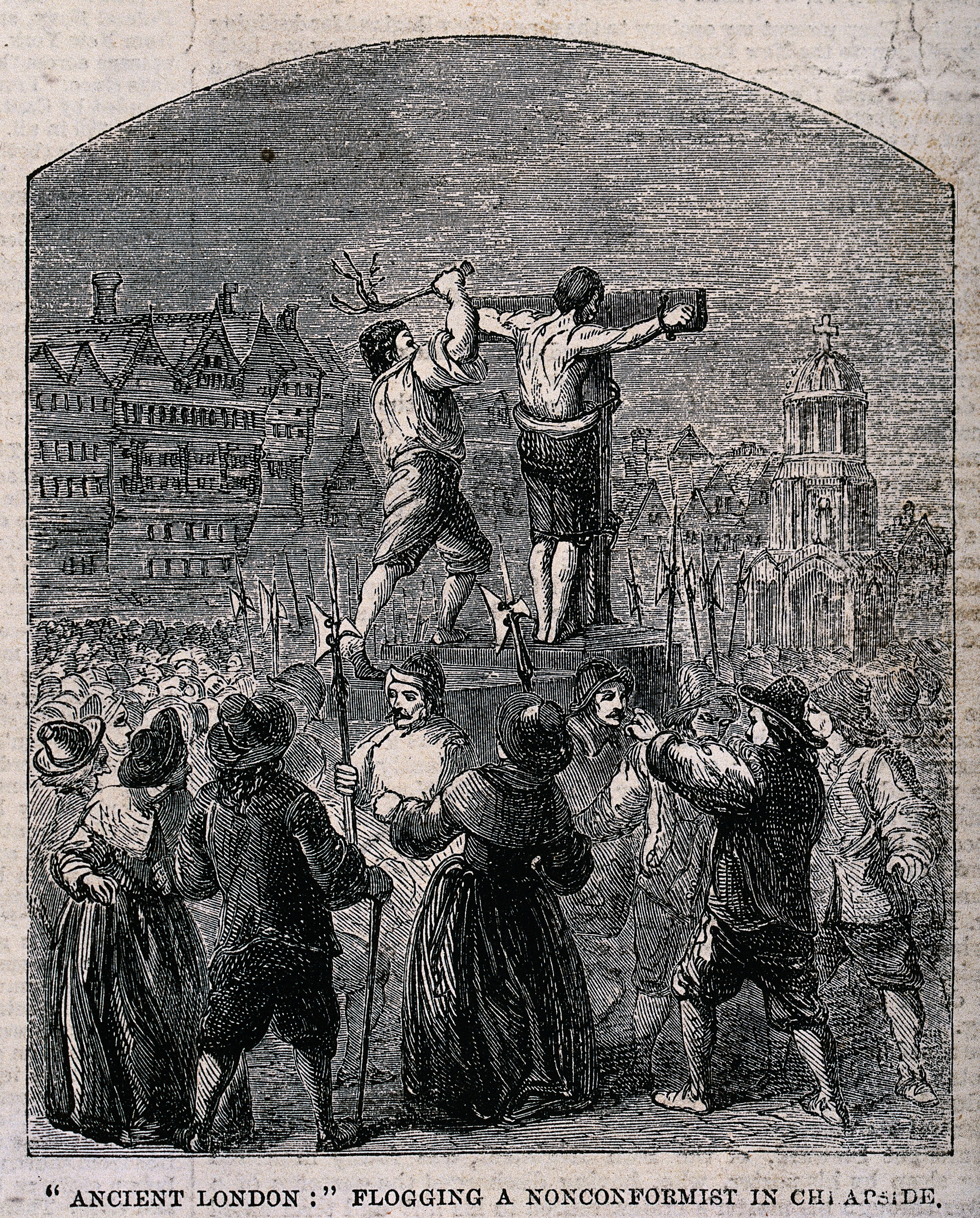
Flagellation of a nonconformist in London in 1685

Presbyterians, Congregationalists, Baptists, Calvinists, other "reformed" groups and less organised sects were identified as Nonconformists at the time of the 1662 Act of Uniformity. Following the act, other groups, including Methodists, Unitarians, Quakers, Plymouth Brethren, and the English Moravians were officially labelled as Nonconformists as they became organised.

The term "dissenter" came into particular use after the Act of Toleration 1689, which exempted those Nonconformists who had taken oaths of allegiance from being penalised for certain acts, such as for non-attendance at Church of England services.

A census of religion in 1851 revealed Nonconformists made up about half the number of people who attended church services on Sundays. In the larger manufacturing areas, Nonconformists clearly outnumbered members of the Church of England.

=== Various Trends within Nonconformism ===
Nonconformists in the 18th and 19th century claimed a devotion to hard work, temperance, frugality, and upward mobility, with which historians today largely agree. A major Unitarian magazine, the Christian Monthly Repository asserted in 1827:

Throughout England a great part of the more active members of society, who have the most intercourse with the people have the most influence over them, are Protestant Dissenters. These are manufacturers, merchants and substantial tradesman, or persons who are in the enjoyment of a competency realised by trade, commerce and manufacturers, gentlemen of the professions of law and physic, and agriculturalists, of that class particularly who live upon their own freehold. The virtues of temperance, frugality, prudence and integrity promoted by religious Nonconformity...assist the temporal prosperity of these descriptions of persons, as they tend also to lift others to the same rank in society.

==== Women ====
The emerging middle-class norm was for women to be excluded from the public sphere – the domain of politics, paid work, commerce and public speaking. Instead, it was considered that women should dominate in the realm of domestic life, focused on care of the family, the husband, the children, the household, religion, and moral behaviour. Religiosity was in the female sphere, and the Nonconformist churches offered new roles that women eagerly entered. They taught Sunday school, visited the poor and sick, distributed tracts, engaged in fundraising, supported missionaries, led Methodist class meetings, prayed with other women, and a few were allowed to preach to mixed audiences.

=== Politics ===
==== Disabilities removed ====
Parliament had imposed a series of disabilities on Nonconformists that prevented them from holding most public offices, that required them to pay local taxes to the Anglican church, be married by Anglican ministers, and be denied attendance at Oxford or degrees at Cambridge. Dissenters demanded removal of political and civil disabilities that applied to them (especially those in the Test and Corporation Acts). The Anglican establishment strongly resisted until 1828.

The Test Act 1673 made it illegal for anyone not receiving communion in the Church of England to hold office under the crown. The Corporation Act 1661 did likewise for offices in municipal government. Although the Test and Corporation Acts remained on the statute-book, in practice they were not enforced against Protestant nonconformists due to the passage of various Indemnity Acts, in particular the Indemnity Act 1727, which relieved Nonconformists from the requirements in the Test Act 1673 and the Corporation Act 1661 that public office holders must have taken the sacrament of the Lord's Supper in an Anglican church.

In 1780, Dissenters in Ireland, who in large numbers had organised in the armed Volunteer movement, were accorded similar relief from the tests of Anglican conformity which had been imposed under the Irish Popery Act of 1704.

In 1732, Nonconformists in the City of London created an association, the Dissenting Deputies to secure final repeal of the Test and Corporation acts. The Deputies became a sophisticated pressure group, and worked with liberal Whigs to achieve repeal in 1828. It was a major achievement for an outside group, but the Dissenters were not finished.

Next on the agenda was the matter of church rates, which were local taxes at the parish level for the support of the parish church building in England and Wales. Only buildings of the established church received the tax money. Civil disobedience was attempted but was met with seizure of personal property and even imprisonment. The compulsory factor was finally abolished in 1868 by William Ewart Gladstone, and payment was made voluntary. While Gladstone was a moralistic evangelical inside the Church of England, he had strong support in the Nonconformist community. The marriage question was settled by Marriage Act 1836 which allowed local government registrars to handle marriages. Nonconformist ministers in their own chapels were allowed to marry couples if a registrar was present. Also in 1836, civil registration of births, deaths and marriages was taken from the hands of local parish officials and given to local government registrars. Burial of the dead was a more troubling problem, for urban chapels rarely had graveyards, and sought to use the traditional graveyards controlled by the established church. The Burial Laws Amendment Act 1880 finally allowed this.

Oxford University required students seeking admission to submit to the Thirty-nine Articles of the Church of England. Cambridge University required that for a diploma. The two ancient universities opposed giving a charter to the new London University in the 1830s, because it had no such restriction. London University, nevertheless, was established in 1836, and by the 1850s Oxford dropped its restrictions. In 1871 Gladstone sponsored legislation that provided full access to degrees and fellowships. The Scottish universities never had restrictions.

==== Impact on politics ====
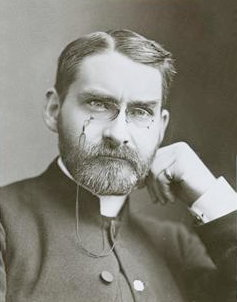
Methodist minister Hugh Price Hughes encouraged Nonconformists to support the Liberal Party.

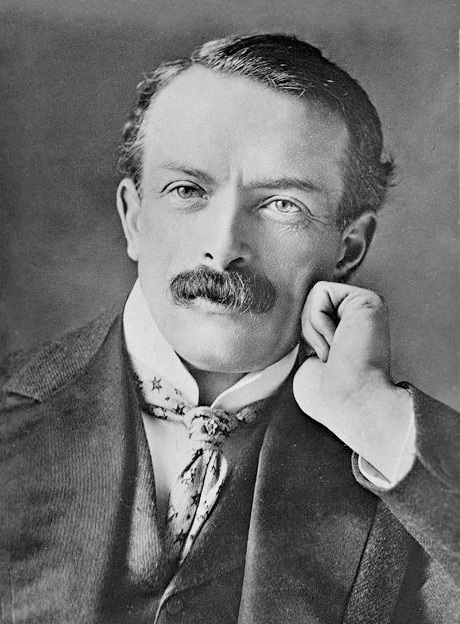
Liberal prime minister David Lloyd George assiduously cultivated Nonconformist support.

Since 1660, Dissenters, later Nonconformists, have played a major role in English politics. In a political context, historians distinguish between two categories of Dissenters, in addition to the evangelical element in the Church of England. "Old Dissenters", dating from the 16th and 17th centuries, included Baptists, Congregationalists, Quakers, Unitarians, and Presbyterians outside Scotland. "New Dissenters" emerged in the 18th century and were mainly Methodists. The "Nonconformist conscience" was their moral sensibility which they tried to implement in British politics. The "Nonconformist conscience" of the Old group emphasised religious freedom and equality, pursuit of justice, and opposition to discrimination, compulsion, and coercion. The New Dissenters (and also the Anglican evangelicals) stressed personal morality issues, including sexuality, family values, and temperance. Both factions were politically active, but until mid-19th century the Old group supported mostly Whigs and Liberals in politics, while the New, like most Anglicans, generally supported Conservatives. By the late 19th century, the New Dissenters had mostly switched to the Liberal Party. The result was a merging of the two groups, strengthening their great weight as a political pressure group.

After the Test and Corporation Acts were repealed in 1828, all the Nonconformists elected to Parliament were Liberals. Relatively few MPs were Dissenters. However the Dissenters were major voting bloc in many areas, such as the East Midlands. They were very well organised and highly motivated and largely won over the Whigs and Liberals to their cause. Gladstone brought the majority of Dissenters around to support for Home Rule for Ireland, putting the dissenting Protestants in league with the Irish Catholics in an otherwise unlikely alliance. The Nonconformist conscience was also repeatedly called upon by Gladstone for support for his moralistic foreign policy. In election after election, Protestant ministers rallied their congregations to the Liberal ticket. (In Scotland, the Presbyterians played a similar role to the Nonconformist Methodists, Baptists and other groups in England and Wales.) Many of the first MPs elected for the Labour Party in the 1900s were also nonconformists.

Nonconformists were angered by the Education Act 1902, which provided for the support of denominational schools from taxes. The elected local school boards that they largely controlled were abolished and replaced by county-level local education authorities that were usually controlled by Anglicans. Worst of all, the hated Anglican schools would now receive funding from local taxes that everyone had to pay. One tactic was to refuse to pay local taxes. John Clifford formed the National Passive Resistance Committee. By 1904 over 37,000 summonses for unpaid school taxes were issued, with thousands having their property seized and 80 protesters going to prison. It operated for another decade but had no impact on the school system. The education issue played a major role in the Liberal victory in the 1906 general election, as Dissenter Conservatives punished their old party and voted Liberal. After 1906, a Liberal attempt to modify the law was blocked by the Conservative-dominated House of Lords; after 1911 when the Lords had been stripped of its veto over legislation, the issue was no longer of high enough priority to produce Liberal action.

By 1914 the linkage between the Nonconformists and Liberal Party was weakening, as secularisation reduced the strength of Dissent in English political life.

=== Today ===
Today, Protestant churches independent of the Anglican Church of England or the Presbyterian Church of Scotland are often called "free churches", meaning they are free from state control. This term is used interchangeably with "Nonconformist".

The steady pace of secularisation picked up faster and faster during the 20th century, until only pockets of nonconformist religiosity remained in England.

== Wales ==
Nonconformity in Wales can be traced to the Welsh Methodist revival; Wales effectively had become a Nonconformist country by the mid-19th century; nonconformist chapel attendance significantly outnumbered Anglican church attendance. They were based in the fast-growing upwardly mobile urban middle class. The influence of Nonconformism in the early part of the 20th century, boosted by the 1904–1905 Welsh Revival, led to the disestablishment of the Anglican Church in Wales in 1920 and the formation of the Church in Wales.

== Scandinavia ==
In other countries, the term Nonconformist is used in a broader sense to refer to Christians who are not communicants of a majority national church, such as the Lutheran Church of Sweden. The largest Nonconformist church in Sweden, the Uniting Church in Sweden, was formed by merging the Baptist Union of Sweden, the United Methodist Church, and the Mission Covenant Church of Sweden.

== Charts of splits and mergers of English nonconformists ==
Splits and mergers of English nonconformists (except Methodists)

Independent Puritans	Presbyterian Puritans
General Baptist churches (1689)	Particular Baptist churches (1689)	Congregationalist churches (1689)	Presbyterian churches (1689)
Some churches became unitarian
New Connexion (1770)
Baptists Union (1813)	Unitarian churches (1778)
BFUA (1825)
Congregational Union (1831)	UPC churches in England
Grace Baptists (1871)
Presbyterian Church (1876)
Free Christian Union (1886)
Baptists Union (1891)
GAUFCC (1928)
Congregational Church (1966)
EFCC (1967)
Congregational Federation (1972)	URC (1972)	Congregational Union (Scotland)
Congregational Federation (2000)	URC (2000)

Splits and mergers of English Methodists

Methodists in CofE (1730s)
Countess of Huntingdon's Connexion (1783)
Evangelical anglicans in CofE (1795)	Wesleyan Methodist Church (1795)
New Connexion (1997)
Independent Methodists (1806)
Presbyterian Church of Wales (1811)	Primitive Methodists (1811)
Bible Christians (1815)
Protestant Methodists (1827)
Wesleyan Association (1836)
Wesleyan Reformers (1849)
Free Methodists (1857)
Wesleyan Reform Union (1859)
Salvation Army (1865)
United Methodist Church (1907)
Methodist Church (1932)

== See also ==
- English Dissenters
- English Presbyterianism
- Christian revival
- Independent (religion)
- Nonconformist register – records of baptisms, weddings and funerals kept by chapels
- Recusancy
- Religion in the United Kingdom
