= Qualification for Employments Act 1726 =

Act of the Parliament of Great Britain

- Act of Parliament
- Parliament of Great Britain
- Long title: An Act for allowing further Time to Persons on board the Fleet, or beyond the Seas in his Majesty's Service, to qualify themselves for the legal Enjoyment of Offices and Employments, and for indemnifying such Persons as have omitted to qualify themselves within the Time limited for that Purpose, and for the better ascertaining such Time.
- Citation: 13 Geo. 1. c. 29
- Territorial extent: Great Britain

Dates
- Royal assent: 15 May 1727
- Commencement: 17 January 1726 (Note: Section 1.)
- Repealed: 15 July 1867
Other legislation
Amends	Corporation Act 1661; Test Act 1673
Repealed by	Statute Law Revision Act 1867

Status: Repealed

Text of statute as originally enacted

The Qualification for Employments Act 1726 (13 Geo. 1. c. 29) was an act of the Parliament of Great Britain during the reign of George I. This was the first Indemnity Act that relieved Nonconformists from the requirements in the Test Act 1673 (25 Cha. 2. c. 2) and the Corporation Act 1661 (13 Cha. 2 St. 2. c. 1) that public office holders must have taken the sacrament of the Lord's Supper in an Anglican church.

The act was intended to give "further time to persons on board the fleet, or beyond the seas in his Majesty's service to qualify themselves for the legal enjoyment of offices and employments, and for the better ascertaining of such time". Nonconformists were described as those who were "zealously affected to his person and government, and the protestant succession to his royal house".

== Subsequent developments ==
The whole act was repealed by section 1 of, and the schedule to, the Statute Law Revision Act 1867 (30 & 31 Vict. c. 59), which came into force on 15 July 1867.
