= Sheriffs' Declaration Act 1835 =

Act of the Parliament of the United Kingdom

Declarations, etc., to be Taken by Sheriffs Act 1835
- Act of Parliament
- Parliament of the United Kingdom
- Long title: An Act for removing Doubts as to the Declaration to be made and Oaths to be taken by Persons appointed to the Office of Sheriff of any City or Town, being a County of itself.
- Citation: 5 & 6 Will. 4. c. 28
- Territorial extent: United Kingdom

Dates
- Royal assent: 21 August 1835
- Commencement: 21 August 1835 (Note: The Acts of Parliament (Commencement) Act 1793.)
- Repealed: 13 July 1871
Other legislation
Repealed by	Promissory Oaths Act 1871
Relates to	Sacramental Test Act 1828

Status: Repealed

Text of statute as originally enacted

The Sheriffs' Declaration Act 1835 (5 & 6 Will. 4. c. 28) was an Act of the Westminster parliament passed in 1835, which allowed individuals to take the office of sheriff without having to make the full declaration required by the Sacramental Test Act 1828 (9 Geo. 4. c. 17). It was a part of the process of the emancipation of the Jews in the United Kingdom.

The issue which provoked the legislation had been the recent election of David Salomans as Sheriff of the City of London. As a Jew, he was unable to state the required final words "and I make this Declaration upon the true Faith of a Christian". The Sheriffs' Declaration Act 1835 removed this requirement and he became sheriff.

In order to become Lord Mayor of London at a later date, Salomans would also need to have been an alderman. He was elected to this position too in 1835, but no further relief was provided until the Municipal Offices Act 1845 (8 & 9 Vict. c. 52). Salomans finally became an alderman in 1847 and Lord Mayor in 1855, and in 1859 was sworn in as a member of parliament where he had faced the same issue.

== Subsequent developments ==
The whole act was repealed by section 1 of, and part I of schedule one to, the Promissory Oaths Act 1871 (34 & 35 Vict. c. 48), which came into force on 13 July 1871.
