= Jewish emancipation in the United Kingdom =

Jewish emancipation in the United Kingdom was the culmination in the 19th century of efforts over many years to remove the legal restrictions set in place on England's Jewish population. Between 1833 and 1890 Parliament passed a series of laws that placed male Jews in the United Kingdom on an equal legal footing with the kingdom's other emancipated males.

== Background ==
When in 1829 the Roman Catholics of the United Kingdom achieved emancipation, granting them civil rights, the hopes of the Jews rose high. The first step toward a similar alleviation in their case was taken in 1830 when William Huskisson presented a petition signed by 2,000 merchants and others of Liverpool. This was immediately followed by a bill presented by Robert Grant in 1830 which was destined to engage the British legislature in one form or another for the next thirty years. Thomas Macaulay, later a well-known and influential historian, was elected to Parliament in 1830 and – among other issues he took up – distinguished himself by attacking the exclusion of Jews.

At first the bill failed to get through the House of Commons. Against the opposition of Sir Robert Inglis, the first reading was passed by 115 to 97 votes. But the second reading, on 17 May, notwithstanding a sizable petition in its favour from 14,000 citizens of London, was rejected by 265 to 228 votes. The next year, 1833, however, it passed its third reading in the Commons on 22 July by a majority of 189 to 52, and was read for the first time in the Lords. On the second reading in the Lords on 1 August it was rejected by 104 to 54, with the Duke of Wellington speaking and voting against the Bill, though the Duke of Sussex, a constant friend to the Jews, presented a petition in its favour signed by 1,000 distinguished citizens of Westminster. The same thing happened in 1834, the bill being lost in the House of Lords by a majority of 92 votes. The whole force of the Tory Party and the personal antagonism of King William IV was against the bill. In the following year it was deemed inadvisable to make the annual appeal to Parliament, as the battle for religious liberty was going on in another part of the field; but by the passing of the Sheriffs' Declaration Act to hold the ancient and important office of sheriff. In the following year the Jew Bill was introduced late in the session, and succeeded in passing its first reading in the Lords on 19 August but was then dropped owing to the lateness of the session.

== Membership of Parliament ==
Sir Sampson Gideon, who had a Jewish father and Christian mother, was a baronet, member of parliament and Irish peer in the eighteenth century. The economist and financier David Ricardo was born into a family of Sephardic Jews but converted to Unitarianism aged 21 and was a member of parliament from 1819 to 1823. Benjamin Disraeli, who was born Jewish and baptized aged 12 into the Church of England, was a member of parliament from 1837, served as Chancellor of the Exchequer in 1852, 1858–1859 and 1867–1868 Conservative governments. He went on to become, in 1868 and again in 1874, Prime Minister of the United Kingdom. He was elevated to the House of Lords in 1876. His willingness to take Christian oaths meant there were no barriers to his political career; for Jews who had not converted to Christianity the oath remained the key obstacle. The oath of office included the words "and I make this Declaration upon the true Faith of a Christian".

For a time the advocates of Jewish emancipation seemed to have lost heart. The chief supporters of the bill were Robert Grant in the Commons and Lord Holland in the Lords, dying in 1838 and 1840 respectively. During the four years following Holland's death, the political activity of the English Jews was concentrated on the attempt to obtain admission to municipal office. A bill to that effect got as far as a first reading in the Lords by one vote, in 1841, but was lost on a second reading. It was not until 31 July 1845 that the bill was carried. On 18 August 1846, the Religious Opinions Relief Act removed some of minor disabilities that affected British Jews and dissenters from the Established Church; the only state office that still remained closed to Jews was Parliament.

The success with which British Jews had induced Parliament to admit them to the shrievalty and to municipal offices had been because Jews had been actual candidates, and had been elected to those offices before any parliamentary relief was asked. It was now decided to adopt the same policy in regard to a seat in Parliament itself.

A Jewish candidate, Lionel de Rothschild, was elected as one of the four members of Parliament for the City of London in 1847 but could not take his seat without taking a Christian oath of office, and the bill that was introduced on 16 December that year was intended to carry out the wishes of a definite English constituency. This passed its third reading in the Commons on 4 May 1848, by a majority of 62 votes, but was rejected in the Lords by 163 non-contents to 128 contents. The same thing happened in 1849 when Lionel de Rothschild was again elected, but in the following year the struggle took on another and more dramatic form.

David Salomons, who had successfully fought the battle for the shrievalty and the aldermanic chair, had been elected member for Greenwich and insisted on taking his seat, refusing to withdraw on being ordered to do so by the speaker, and adding to his offence by voting in the division on the motion for adjournment which was made to still the uproar caused by his bold course of action. The prime minister, Lord John Russell, moved that Salomons be ordered to withdraw, and on that motion Salomons spoke in a dignified and forcible manner, and won the sympathy of the House, which nevertheless passed the Prime Minister's motion. The matter was then referred to the law courts, which decided that Salomons had no right to vote without having taken the oath of abjuration in the form appointed by Parliament, and fined him £500 for each vote he had recorded in the Commons. The government then brought in another bill in 1853, which was also rejected by the Lords. In 1855, Salomons was elected Lord Mayor of London.

In the following two years, bills were introduced by the government to modify the parliamentary oath, but they failed to obtain the assent of the Lords. In 1858 when the Oath Bill reached the Lords they eliminated the clause relating to Jews; but when the bill was referred again to the Commons, the lower house refused to accept it as amended, and appointed a committee to formulate its reasons, upon which committee, as if to show the absurdity of the situation, the member for the City of London, Lionel de Rothschild, was appointed to serve, something which he could legally do, even though he had not taken his seat. A conference was appointed between the two houses, and ultimately a compromise was reached with the passage of the Jews Relief Act 1858 by which either house might admit Jews by resolution, allowing them to omit the words "on the true faith of a Christian".

As a consequence, on Monday, 26 July 1858, Lionel de Rothschild took the oath with covered head, substituting "so help me, Jehovah" for the ordinary form of oath, and thereupon took his seat as the first Jewish member of Parliament; David Salomons was re-elected for Greenwich in a by-election and took his seat in early 1859. Two years later a more general form of oath for all members of Parliament was introduced, which freed the Jews from all cause of exclusion.

== Reforms and political freedoms ==
The Reform Act 1867 granted every adult male householder the right to vote. In 1871, in the wake of the case of Numa Edward Hartog, the Universities Tests Act removed the difficulties in the way of a Jew becoming a scholar or a fellow in an English university. In 1885, Sir Nathaniel de Rothschild was raised to the upper house as Lord Rothschild, the first Jewish Lord. In 1876 Disraeli was made Earl of Beaconsfield. They were followed within a few years by Henry de Worms as Lord Pirbright and Sydney Stern as Lord Wandsworth. In 1890 all restrictions for every position in the British Empire were removed being thrown open to every British citizen without distinction of creed, except for that of monarch and the offices of Lord High Chancellor and of Lord Lieutenant of Ireland.

For some time after their admission to Parliament, the Jewish MPs belonged to the party that had given them that privilege, the Liberal Party, and Sir George Jessel acted as solicitor-general in William Ewart Gladstone's first ministry. But from the time of the Conservative reaction in 1874 Jewish voters and candidates showed an increasing tendency toward the Conservatives. The influence of Benjamin Disraeli may have had some effect on this change, but it was in the main due to the altered politics of the middle and commercial classes, to which the Jews chiefly belonged. Baron Henry de Worms acted as under Secretary of State in one of Lord Salisbury's ministries, while Sir Julian Goldsmid, a Liberal Unionist after the Home Rule policy of Gladstone was declared, made a marked impression as Deputy Speaker of the House of Commons.

== Communal organisations and disunity ==
The pause which occurred between 1840 and 1847 in the emancipation struggle was due in large measure to a schism, which at the time seemed unfortunate, which had split the Jewish community in two and which prevented the members acting in unison for the defence of their rights. The Reform movement had reached England in a mild form under the influence of the Goldsmid family, which had been touched by the Mendelssohnian movement. In 1841 a Reform congregation was established in London, and was practically excommunicated by both the Spanish haham and the German chief rabbi. The effect of these differences was to delay common action as regards emancipation and other affairs; and it was not until 1859 that the charity organisation was put on a firm footing by the creation of the Jewish Board of Guardians. Ten years later the congregations were brought under one rule by the formation of the United Synagogue (1870), in the charter of which an attempt was made to give the Chief Rabbi autocratic powers over the doctrines to be taught in the Jewish communities throughout the British Empire. But Parliament, which had recently disestablished the Irish Church, did not feel disposed to establish the Jewish Synagogue, and the clause was stricken out. The chief rabbi's salary is paid partly out of contributions from the provincial synagogues, and this gives him a certain amount of authority over all the Jews of the empire with the exception of the 3,000 or more Sephardim, who have a separate haham, and of the dwindling band of Reformers, who number about 2,000, scattered in London, Manchester, and Bradford. In 1871 the Anglo-Jewish Association was established to take the place, so far as regards the British empire, of the Alliance Israélite, which had been weakened by the Franco-German war. The Jews of England felt that they should be organised to take their proper part in Jewish affairs in general. For many years they, together with the French Jews, were the only members of the religion who were unhampered by disabilities; and this enabled them to act more freely in cases where the whole body of Israel was concerned.

== Fighting blood libels ==
As early as 1840, when the blood accusation was revived with regard to the Damascus affair, and Jewish matters were for the first time treated on an international basis, the Jews of England took by far the most prominent position in the general protest of the European Jewries against the charge. Not only was the Board of Deputies at London the sole Jewish body in Europe to hold public meetings, but owing to their influence a meeting of protest was held by eminent Christians at the Mansion House, London (3 July 1840), which formed a precedent for subsequent distinguished gatherings. Sir Moses Montefiore, after aiding the Damascus Jews by obtaining, in an interview with the Sultan at Constantinople, a firman repudiating the blood accusation, visited Russia in 1846 to intercede for his coreligionists there. In 1860 he went to Rome in connection with the Mortara affair; and in 1863 he led a mission to Morocco on behalf of Jews of that country. Action was likewise taken by the chief English Jews in behalf of the unfortunate Hebrews of the Danubian principalities. Francis Goldsmid made an interpellation in the House of Commons with regard to the Jews of Serbia (29 March 1867), and started a debate in that assembly (19 April 1872) on the subject of the persecutions of the Jews in Romania. As a consequence a Romanian committee was formed, which watched the activities of the illiberal government of that country.

== Pogroms in Russia ==
When in 1881 the outburst of violence in Russia brought the position of the Russian Jews prominently before the world, it was their coreligionists in England who took the lead in organising measures for their relief. Articles in The Times of 11 and 13 January 1882, drew the attention of the whole world to the extent of the persecutions, and a meeting of the most prominent citizens of London was held at the Mansion House on 1 February 1882 (see Mansion House Meeting). As a consequence a fund was raised amounting to more than £108,000, and a complete scheme of distributing in the United States the Russian refugees from Brody was organised by the committee of the Mansion House Fund. Similarly, when a revival of the persecutions took place in 1891, another meeting was held at the Guildhall, and a further sum of over £100,000 was collected and devoted to facilitating the westward movement of the Russian exodus. An attempt was made this time to obtain access directly to the czar by the delivery of a petition from the lord mayor and citizens of London; but this was contemptuously rejected, and the Russo-Jewish committee which carried out the work of the Mansion House Fund was obliged to confine its activity to measures outside Russia. When Maurice de Hirsch formed his elaborate scheme for the amelioration of the condition of the persecuted Jews, headquarters were established by him in London, though the administration was practically directed from Paris. The immigrants being excluded from most of the cities of the Continent, the burden of receiving most of the Russian refugees moving westward fell on England, as well as America.

=== Result of the Russian exodus ===
The advent of such a large number of Jews, unprovided with capital, and often without a definite occupation, brought with it difficulties. It was only natural that the newcomers should arouse a certain amount of prejudice by their foreign habits, by the economic pressure they brought to bear upon certain trades, especially on that of clothing, and by their overcrowding in certain localities. While the Continent had seen the rise of strong anti-Semitic feeling, England had been comparatively free from any exhibition of this kind. During Lord Beaconsfield's ministry, a few murmurs had been heard from the more advanced Liberals against the "Semitic" tendencies of the prime minister and his brethren in the race, but as a rule social had followed political emancipation almost automatically. The Russian influx threatened to disturb this natural process, and soon after 1891 protests began to be heard against the alien immigrants. Bills were even introduced into Parliament to check their entry into England. Nothing came of these protests, however, till the year 1902, when the question had reached such a point that it was deemed desirable to appoint a royal commission to inquire into the whole subject. The commission heard evidence both from those favouring and from those opposed to restricted immigration. Reports were made to the House of Commons that the arrival, in the East End of London, of Eastern European Jews, had brought smallpox and scarlet fever. The evidence, however, does not appear to have supported these accusations.

== See also ==
- History of the Jews in England
- History of the Jews in England (1066–1200)
- Edict of Expulsion
- History of the Marranos in England
- Resettlement of the Jews in England
  - Menasseh Ben Israel (1604–1657)
- Jewish Naturalization Act 1753
- Influences on the standing of the Jews in England
- Early English Jewish literature
- Rothschild family
- History of the Jews in Scotland
