= No Rest for the Wicked (webcomic) =

Fantasy webcomic by Andrea L. Peterson

- Author: Andrea L. Peterson
- Website: www.forthewicked.net/about.php
- Current status/schedule: this comic was last updated in February 2013
- Launch date: April 20, 2003
- Genre: Fantasy

No Rest for the Wicked is a fantasy webcomic by Andrea L. Peterson. The characters are loosely based on characters from traditional fairy tales, including those by Hans Christian Andersen, Charles Perrault, and the Brothers Grimm. The plot revolves around a princess who has been an insomniac since the disappearance of the Moon and her journey to restore the Moon to the sky. As of August 2007 it is on the fourth chapter, with a total of 200 pages thus far. The story has a generally elegiac mood, an undercurrent of sadness leavened with humor throughout. No Rest for the Wicked is now also available in Italian, German, and Japanese.

== Characters ==
=== Main ===
November
An oversensitive princess, youngest of three sisters, who is allergic to peas and bruises very easily (having once received one from a leaf falling from a tree). November has been unable to sleep since the Moon disappeared, and has set out on a quest to find where the Moon lies buried in hopes that restoring the Moon will solve her sleeping problem. She has been cursed so whenever she utters the word "altruistic" a frog or toad comes out of her mouth. She is affianced to The Boy, but ran away from home prior to their wedding. She is slightly biased in favor of nobility, and is drawn to atlases (which are always titled "The World") and especially their last page (the End of the World, which is an allusion to Revolutionary Girl Utena), to where she believes she may eventually have to travel.

November's sensitivity takes many forms. She is soft-hearted and empathizes with people, even those that are brutish (Beast) or feel no self-pity (Clare). She "reads" other people well, as when she persuaded Perrault to join her. More mystically, she senses Death in Red's house and intuits that Clare has met the Moon. Finally, she is sensitive to noble blood (and its absence) in other people and can even detect that Clare was a queen by marriage. Because of her soft-hearted nature and assurance in her intuition, she often acts recklessly, with little consideration for her personal safety. November can be thought of as the "heart" of the group, and is the (unofficial) leader of the party.

November has the most extensive known family of all the main characters. Not only is she affianced to The Boy, she is also known to have two older sisters (August and September in order of age), a mother, and a father (King January), all named after months of the year.

While her relationship with Perrault and Red is often good, it goes through fluctuations; most recently, there seems to be a rift between November and Red over Red's ruthless actions in burning the Witch.

Perrault
A cunning cat who can take on a "person-ish" form and who has elevated his master's position in life from peasant to Marquis. While he lives the life of a gentleman-at-leisure, he has not lost his taste for hunting small animals. Current kill count: numerous mice, birds, and frogs. Before he gave himself the name Perrault, he was known simply as Puss. He's vain and selfish for the simple reason that he's a cat.

Perrault is amusing himself by keeping Princess November company in her travels, but expects to be able to return home whenever he gets bored, thanks to a magic ring that he stole from Beast. (Whether the ring actually has that power or some other is not yet known.) It is hinted that Perrault has another reason for joining November, but it has not yet been explained. Perrault is clever, diplomatic and gifted at talking, preferring to use words to get what he wants, rather than force; he is also gifted at planning and strategy, and compensates somewhat for November's rashness.

Perrault can sense ("smell") magic nearby, which he's used multiple times to detect trouble. Perrault delights in applying his many talents to solving challenging problems with minimal effort, often conning or tricking others into doing what he wants. He often finds himself on the wrong end of Red's axe, because she hates "clever beasts", and is quick to assume that he has harmed or offended November in some way. Perrault can be considered the "brains" of the group, often offering the others advice on how to deal with various situations (such as telling November that witches are vulnerable to fire during the battle with the Witch), though he almost never directly helps himself (he told November about it while he was on the roof, out of harm's way.)

For family, Perrault doesn't like other people's children and has "perhaps two dozen" children of his own which he abandoned. He believes that a true cat will figure out to look after himself, much like he himself did.

Many people believe Perrault to be a catperson. However, on the forums, the author has stated that he is simply a cat. His appearance is that of a human.

"Red"
A girl in a tattered red cloak who lives deep in the woods by herself. After a traumatic encounter with a certain wolf, Red has made it her business to kill every single flesh-eating beast she comes across, especially the ones that talk. She carries a handwoven basket and an axe. While the comic's art is mostly grayscale, "Red"'s cape is always shown in color, similar to Mary in Frank Miller's Sin City.

Red is fond of flowers; this is mismatched with her fondness for violence and formidable combat skills. Unlike Perrault, who utilizes his intellect and various abilities to solve problems, Red talks very little and prefers to solve problems with her axe or sheer brute force. Despite having the appearance of a young woman, Red has incredible physical strength: she has thrown Beast out of his own castle and held her own against the Witch, meaning she is more than a match for supernatural monstrosities in her way. Her axe seems nigh-unbreakable, even tearing down metal castle hinges in a few blows. She can be considered the "brawn" of the group.

Having lived so long in isolation, Red is not very social with other people and is pitiless towards monsters; nevertheless, she seems to feel real affection for November and is very protective of her. Red states that she has died before, but in what sense is unclear. How Red came to live in the woods is also unknown. She also seems to take the Witch's cannibalizing of children extremely personally.

Red is the only main character who has not once mentioned her family. Since she is based on Little Red Riding Hood, however, it was confirmed during the fourth chapter that Red once had a grandmother, who may be the "second person" she references when talking about who died in the bed in her cabin. This was revealed during a flashback, depicting a younger Red visiting her grandmother, only to encounter an individual who is (presumably) the wolf from the original fairy tale. It is possible that Red's cabin is, in fact, her grandmother's cabin, and that she ended up in the woods fighting the monsters that took away her grandmother (Red's cabin in the woods is filled with wolf pelts).

Fighting the Witch, she was temporarily absorbed into the witch's stomach. However, when November struck the Witch with a hot poker, Red was able to free herself, and after this, she shoved the Witch into her own oven, burning her alive. This act, which November regarded as horrendously cruel, may have created a rift between the two (though Perrault seems to ignore it, perhaps not caring about the relationship between two "humans").

=== Secondary ===
Pierre
The Marquis de Carabas, Pierre is about as intelligent as the average lemming, and it is only through Perrault's influence that he can wear silk and nice boots. Pierre is married to Colette and needs every aspect of his life to be overseen by his cat, whom he calls "Puss". Before this, he was a peasant.

Colette
Pierre's wife, a dignified princess with a distaste for cats, rodents, and anything that does not belong in a palace. Easily fooled by gold and good looks, she mistakes November for a commoner and her husband for a nobleman.

The Boy
A peasant boy who has never felt fear and is innocently curious about it. He rids the kingdom of all the fiends and monsters and in the process finds a trove of treasure, hands a share of it to King January (November's father), and as reward chose November (the youngest daughter) as his bride. Last seen wandering the countryside with a bag of gold looking for his fiancée and attempting to learn what fear is.

Beast
A hulking mass of fur and teeth with a penchant for speaking at the top of his voice, even in a library. Beast is something of an anti-social botanist stalker, as he has a magnificent rose garden and a ring which he uses to propose to Beauty every day at breakfast, lunch, or dinner, or whenever he happens to see her. He always seems close to foaming at the mouth. He is mocked by Red, who then throws him out of a window and nearly kills him. Beast may now be affianced to Beauty, who mistook his fall from the window as an attempted suicide over despair at her "long" absence of ten days.

Beauty
The young lady in Beast's mansion who puts up with being proposed to breakfast, lunch, or dinner of every day. Last seen tearfully reuniting with the Beast after a visit with her family. Beauty regards Beast as a sensitive creature, and "cares about him very much, [but] seems reluctant to commit to marrying him"

Clare
A young woman with bandaged wrists where her hands ought to be. She was first seen after being sentenced to be burned at the stake as a witch for allegedly stealing a town's children (the Witch, below, was actually responsible). Flashbacks reveal that, as a girl, Clare was sold to the devil by her parents, who cut off her hands at his request (Clare's tears on her hands had kept the devil at bay, at least in the original fairy tale). Clare was visited that night by the Moon (it was a new moon), who told her a secret that may have prevented the devil from taking her. After this, Clare set out on her own.

Eventually, while in the woods, she met a king and became a queen — November intuited this beforehand — and at some point had mechanical hands crafted for her, made out of silver.

Since then, however, Clare has become vagrant, possibly looking for her child — when November talks of how horribly Clare's parents treated her, Clare responded with "I'm exactly the same." The story behind those words is unknown. A rumor going about among fans is that her child is deceased (she was lurking around a grave when the villagers found her) but it is otherwise unknown at this point what she meant.

She has now decided to travel with November for the purpose of showing her where the "coffin, candle, and cross" she was told of have been located.

Before her name was released in the fan art section, she was known to fans as The Girl With No Hands.

The Witch
An old woman living out in the woods near a town. She initially comes across as delusional, a sick yet tragic figure. When she was younger, her husband left her and their two children, Hansel and Gretel; she then moved to the forest to escape the malicious rumors in town. When Hansel fell sick and possibly died, she went insane and decided that she'd brought children into a hostile world and could only keep them safe by taking them back — into herself. She cannibalized both in pies. She since took to believing that everyone she meets is either Hansel or Gretel, gotten "out" of her.

Horrifically, these incidents coincided with starvation in a nearby village; villagers began abandoning their children into the forest in desperation, hoping they'd somehow make it in the outside world. The Witch found these children, took them in, and ate them. Her house is made of gingerbread which Perrault identifies as enchanted (by whom is unknown, but presumably the Witch), and it works as a lure to the hungry children.

She meets the party when they go out to prove Clare's innocence. Arriving first, November sees her, but does not know her story; the Witch goes into a monologue about her life and the truth is revealed to November (who becomes almost ill after hearing it). Upon attempting to eat November, she is attacked by Red.

When attacked, she reveals herself to be an inhuman creature worthy of her deeds- she is capable of taking massive wounds and functioning, suffering decapitation, and even commanding those parts of her body severed by Red's axe (they hover around the room and strike). Her favored weapon seems to be a butcher knife. Whenever badly wounded, the ghostly hands of children emerge from her body; they have grabbed foes (such as Red), dragging them into the Witch's body, and have also worked as healing for the Witch, reattaching destroyed body parts. Apparently, foes who have been "absorbed" in this method remain alive, though for how long is unknown — Red was able to survive a few minutes of absorption, but this may be due to her sheer strength.

Red, while dealing damage to the Witch, was unable to permanently harm her; after Red was devoured by the hands of the children emerging from the Witch's stomach, Perrault managed to pass instructions to a distraught November by posing as "Hansel" while on the rooftop of the gingerbread house. Picking up on the hint, November used a poker to strike the Witch with a heated poker from the fire (fire being what Perrault mentioned as "preferred when dealing with your kind", meaning witches- a reference to being burned at the stake).

The wound this caused was enough to let Red free herself, slashing her way out of the witch's stomach and landing unceremoniously on the cabin floor; beating the witch severely with the poker, Red disabled her long enough to throw her into the oven. She locked the witch in to die screaming.

The Witch, through her story and her death, is obviously the Witch from the story "Hansel and Gretel".

Prince Ricardo
Overly fastidious Prince, son of King Ricardo. Better known as "Dick the Picky". Introduced in the second Interlude, "The Wandering Swordsman". He reached the tower of Sleeping Beauty, a supposedly impossible task. However, his overly picky habits caused him to reject her after he learned that she snored. There are hints that he is wandering the world, searching for a "perfect" princess. As such, he may be the Prince from The Princess and the Pea, who was also said to have quested for such a bride, before returning to his castle.

The Moon
Takes the form of a beautiful lady carrying a lantern. Her task is to bear her lantern across the sky for all but one day a month; on the day of the new moon she usually rests. At the beginning of the story, the Moon has been missing for over a year, during which November has not slept.

== Myths, Tales, Legends, and Folklore ==
No Rest for the Wicked is freely adapted and cobbled together from a myriad of fairy tales, including:

- The Princess and the Pea
- Puss in Boots
- Little Red-Cap
- The Story of the Youth Who Went Forth to Learn What Fear Was
- The Buried Moon
- Beauty and the Beast
- The Girl Without Hands
- Hansel and Gretel
- Bearskin
- Snow White and Rose Red

The up-to-date list of tales used can be found in the 'Extra' section of the webcomic's site. Generally, the tales' most widely read versions are used in the story, but none of them are watered down and several involve dismemberment, cannibalism and other dark themes.

== Awards ==
- The cast of No Rest for the Wicked presented the award for Outstanding Fantasy Comic at the 2005 Web Cartoonists' Choice Awards.
- No Rest for the Wicked was nominated for Outstanding Fantasy Comic in the 2006 WCCAs and won 2007 Outstanding Fantasy Comic.
