= Handel's Naturalisation Act 1727 =

Act of the Parliament of Great Britain

- Act of Parliament
- Parliament of Great Britain
- Long title: An Act for naturalizing Louis Sechehaye, George Frideric Handel, Anthony Furstenau and Michael Schlegel.
- Citation: 13 Geo. 1. c. 2 Pr.
- Territorial extent: Great Britain

Dates
- Royal assent: 20 February 1727
- Commencement: 17 January 1727 (Note: Start of session.)

Status: Spent

The Handel's Naturalisation Act 1727 (13 Geo. 1. c. 2 Pr.) is an act of the Parliament of Great Britain with the intent of naturalising German-born composer George Frideric Handel and other foreigners as British subjects.

== Background ==
George Frideric Handel

In 1723, Handel had been appointed as Composer of Music for King George I of Great Britain's Chapel Royal. He was also expected to teach the princesses of the Royal Family; however, the Schism Act 1714 prohibited foreigners from officially teaching without a licence from a bishop, though there was an exemption in the law for educating children of nobility.

== Process ==
On 13 February 1727, a petition was presented to the House of Lords to grant Handel the status of a British subject as this was the only method by which this could be achieved. The petition was referred to a Lords committee. In order for the petition to be valid before it could be considered, Handel was obliged to provide evidence that he had taken the Oath of Supremacy and the Oath of Allegiance as well as entering into communion with the Church of England. The petition was accepted and brought before Parliament as a private bill and added to a bill for naturalising Louis Sechehaye and others. Prior to Second Reading, Handel took the oaths in the presence of the House of Lords. The certificate that he had accepted communion with the Church of England was also presented, though it was suggested that Handel accepted just to conform with the law and maintained elements of his Lutheranism while praising the Church of England for affording him protection under which he would not "suffer any molestation or inconvenience on account of his religious principles". The bill was passed by Parliament and was granted royal assent by the King a few days later, at which point Handel and the others became subjects of the Kingdom of Great Britain. With that, the enactment became spent.

== Bibliography ==
- Hansard (1726). "13 Geo". Journal of the House of Lords. Vol. 23. H.M. Stationery Office.
