= The Buried Moon =

English fairy tale

The Buried Moon or The Dead Moon is a fairy tale included by Joseph Jacobs in More English Fairy Tales. It has few variants, appearing more mythological than is common for fairy tales. It was collected by Marie Clothilde Balfour from the North Lincolnshire Carrs in the Ancholme Valley; its unusual characteristics made many people doubt its origins as a fairy tale. However, when Mrs. Balfour published her notes, they were generally found reliable. The story may evidence a form of moon worship. It is catalogued as ATU 1336.

== Synopsis ==
Once upon a time, the Carland was filled with bogs. When the moon shone, it was as safe to walk in as by day, but when she did not, evil things, such as bogies, came out.

One day the moon, hearing of this, pulled on a black cloak over her yellow hair and went to see for herself. She fell into a pool, and a snag bound her there. She saw a man coming toward the pool and fought to be free until the hood fell off; the light helped the man make his way to safety and scared off the evil creatures. She struggled to follow until the hood fell back over her hair, and all the evil things came out of the darkness, trapping her under a big stone with a will-o'-the-wyke to sit on the cross-shaped snag and keep watch.

The moon stopped rising, and the people have been wondering what had happened, until the man saved by the moon told what he had seen. A wise woman sent them into the bog until they found a coffin (the stone), a candle (the will-o'-the-wyke), and a cross (the snag); the moon would be nearby. They did as the wise woman said, and freed the moon. From this time on the moon has shone brighter over the boglands than anywhere else, and the evil things were chased from the Carland.

== Modern adaptions ==
- Charles de Lint retold this as "The Moon Is Drowning While I Sleep".
- The webcomic No Rest for the Wicked uses several elements of the tale as initiating events of the story; the main character is an insomniac princess on a quest to find the missing moon.
- French power metal band Wildpath did a musical adaptation of the tale on their album Underneath. A music video for the song, Buried Moon, was released in 2012.

== See also ==
- Drawing down the Moon (ritual)
