= Act of Indemnity =

In legal terms, an Act of Indemnity is a statute passed to protect people who have committed some illegal act which would otherwise cause them to be subjected to legal penalties. International treaties may contain articles that bind states to abide by similar terms which may involve the parties to the treaty passing domestic legislation to implement the indemnity laid out in the treaty.

== International treaties ==
- Treaty of Westphalia 1648 (Art 2) (Note: [Treaty of Westphalia (Act 2)] That there shall be on the one side and the other a perpetual Oblivion, Amnesty, or Pardon of all that has been committed since the beginning of these Troubles, ... that no body, under any pretext whatsoever, shall practice any Acts of Hostility, entertain any Enmity, or cause any Trouble to each other; neither as to Persons, Effects and Securities, ... that all ... shall be buried in eternal Oblivion.)
- Treaty of Küçük Kaynarca 1774 (Art I)

== Domestic laws ==
=== United Kingdom and preceding states ===
The United Kingdom has three legal jurisdictions. Those acts passed during the Interregnum (1649–1660) were themselves rendered null and void with the Restoration of the monarchy in England, Scotland and Ireland in 1660.

==== England and Wales ====
- Act of General Pardon and Oblivion 1652, passed by the Rump Parliament during the First Commonwealth
- Act of Indemnity and Free Pardon 1659, during the Second Commonwealth
- Indemnity and Oblivion Act 1660 (12 Cha. 2. c. 11) (or Act of Indemnity 1660), following the Restoration
- Indemnity Act 1690 (2 Will. & Mar. Sess. 2. c. 13), following the Glorious Revolution
- Indemnity Act 1703 (1 Ann. St. 2. c. 21)
- Indemnity Act 1717 (3 Geo. 1. c. 19), following the Jacobite rising of 1715
- Indemnity Act 1727 (1 Geo. 2. St. 2. c. 23), relieved Dissenters from the oaths of the Test and Corporation Acts
- Indemnity Act 1747 (20 Geo. 2. c. 52), following the Jacobite rising of 1745
- Indemnity Act 1767 (7 Geo. 3. c. 56), one of the Townshend Acts, relating to the British colonies in North America
- Coatbridge and Springburn Elections (Validation) Act 1945 (9 & 10 Geo. 6. c. 3)
- Camberwell, Bristol and Nottingham Elections (Validation) Act 1946 (9 & 10 Geo. 6. c. 43)
- House of Commons (Indemnification of Certain Members) Act 1949 (12, 13 & 14 Geo. 6. c. 46)
- Reverend J. G. MacManaway's Indemnity Act 1951 (14 & 15 Geo. 6. c. 29)
- Price Control and other Orders (Indemnity) Act 1951 (14 & 15 Geo. 6. c. 59)
- Niall Macpherson Indemnity Act 1954 (2 & 3 Eliz. 2. c. 29)
- Validation of Elections Act 1955 (4 & 5 Eliz. 2. c. 10)
- Validation of Elections (No. 2) Act 1955 (4 & 5 Eliz. 2. c. 12)
- Validation of Elections (No. 3) Act 1955 (4 & 5 Eliz. 2. c. 13)
- Charles Beattie Indemnity Act 1956 (4 & 5 Eliz. 2. c. 27)
- Town and Country Planning Regulations (London) (Indemnity) Act 1970 (c. 57)

==== Scotland ====
- Act of Pardon and Grace to the People of Scotland 1654 (Cromwell's Act of Grace)
- Pardon Act 1662 (c. 71 (S)) (Act of indemnity and oblivion)

==== Ireland prior to 1921 and Northern Ireland ====
- Act of Free and General Pardon, Indemnity, and Oblivion [for Ireland] 1664–1665?
- Northern Ireland (Sentences) Act 1998 (c. 35) see also Sentence Review Commission

=== Bangladesh ===
- Indemnity Act, Bangladesh, which gave immunity from legal action to the persons involved in the assassination of president Sheikh Mujibur Rahman

=== South Africa ===
- Indemnity Act, 1961, which gave immunity to the government in relation to the Sharpeville massacre
- Indemnity Act, 1977, which gave immunity to the government in relation to the Soweto uprising
