= List of acts of the Parliament of Great Britain from 1726 =

This is a complete list of acts of the Parliament of Great Britain for the year 1726.

For acts passed until 1707, see the list of acts of the Parliament of England and the list of acts of the Parliament of Scotland. See also the list of acts of the Parliament of Ireland.

For acts passed from 1801 onwards, see the list of acts of the Parliament of the United Kingdom. For acts of the devolved parliaments and assemblies in the United Kingdom, see the list of acts of the Scottish Parliament, the list of acts of the Northern Ireland Assembly, and the list of acts and measures of Senedd Cymru; see also the list of acts of the Parliament of Northern Ireland.

The number shown after each act's title is its chapter number. Acts are cited using this number, preceded by the year(s) of the reign during which the relevant parliamentary session was held; thus the Union with Ireland Act 1800 is cited as "39 & 40 Geo. 3. c. 67", meaning the 67th act passed during the session that started in the 39th year of the reign of George III and which finished in the 40th year of that reign. Note that the modern convention is to use Arabic numerals in citations (thus "41 Geo. 3" rather than "41 Geo. III"). Acts of the last session of the Parliament of Great Britain and the first session of the Parliament of the United Kingdom are both cited as "41 Geo. 3".

Acts passed by the Parliament of Great Britain did not have a short title; however, some of these acts have subsequently been given a short title by acts of the Parliament of the United Kingdom (such as the Short Titles Act 1896).

Before the Acts of Parliament (Commencement) Act 1793 came into force on 8 April 1793, acts passed by the Parliament of Great Britain were deemed to have come into effect on the first day of the session in which they were passed. Because of this, the years given in the list below may in fact be the year before a particular act was passed.

== 13 Geo. 1 ==
The fifth session of the 6th Parliament of Great Britain, which met from 17 January 1727 until 15 May 1727.

This session was also traditionally cited as 13 G. 1.

=== Public acts ===
Short title	Citation	Royal assent
Long title
Land Tax Act 1726 (repealed)	13 Geo. 1. c. 1	20 February 1727
An Act for granting an Aid to His Majesty, by a Land Tax, to be raised in Great Britain, for the Service of the Year One Thousand Seven Hundred and Twenty-seven. (Repealed by Statute Law Revision Act 1867 (30 & 31 Vict. c. 59))
Mutiny Act 1726 (repealed)	13 Geo. 1. c. 2	24 March 1727
An Act for punishing Mutiny and Desertion; and for the better Payment of the Army and their Quarters. (Repealed by Statute Law Revision Act 1867 (30 & 31 Vict. c. 59))
National Debt Act 1726 (repealed)	13 Geo. 1. c. 3	24 March 1727
An Act for redeeming sundry Annuities, transferrable at the Bank of England, and the Annuities payable on Standing Orders for Army Debentures, by the Produce of the Sinking Fund; for applying to the same Fund the Money remaining in the Exchequer on the Head of the Bankers Debt, and making Provision for future Claims on the same Debt; and for applying the Lottery Tickets, Anno 1726, which were returned into the Exchequer, to the discharging the Standing Orders made out for the Sufferers at Nevis and St. Christophers, as far as the same will extend. (Repealed by Statute Law Revision Act 1870 (33 & 34 Vict. c. 69))
Beverley Improvement Act 1726 (repealed)	13 Geo. 1. c. 4	24 March 1727
An Act for cleansing, deepening, and widening, a Creek called Beverley Beck, running into the River Hull; and for repairing the Staithes near the said Beck; and for amending the Roads leading from the said River, to the Town of Beverley, in the East Riding of the County of York; and for cleansing the Streets of the said Town. (Repealed by Humberside Act 1982 (c. iii))
Importation Act 1726 (repealed)	13 Geo. 1. c. 5	24 March 1727
An Act for importing Salt from Europe into the Province of Pensilvania, in America. (Repealed by Statute Law Revision Act 1867 (30 & 31 Vict. c. 59))
Sunderland Port Act 1726 (repealed)	13 Geo. 1. c. 6	24 March 1727
An Act for making more effectual an Act, passed in the Third Year of His Majesty's Reign, intituled, "An Act for the Preservation and Improvement of the River Wear, and Port and Haven of Sunderland, in the County of Durham." (Note: Sunderland Harbour and River Wear Act 1716 (3 Geo. 1. c. 3 Pr.)) (Repealed by River Wear and Sunderland Harbour Improvement Act 1809 (49 Geo. 3. c. xli))
Taxation, etc. Act 1726 (repealed)	13 Geo. 1. c. 7	24 April 1727
An Act for continuing the Duties upon Malt, Mum, Cyder, and Perry, in that Part of Great Britain called England; and for granting to His Majesty certain Duties upon Malt, Mum, Cyder, and Perry, in that Part of Great Britain called Scotland, for the Service of the Year One Thousand Seven Hundred and Twenty-seven; and for appropriating the Supplies granted in this Session of Parliament; and for making forth Duplicates of Exchequer Bills, Lottery Tickets, and Orders, lost, burnt, or otherwise destroyed; and for giving further Time to Clerks and Apprentices to pay Duties omitted to be paid for their Indentures and Contracts. (Repealed by Statute Law Revision Act 1867 (30 & 31 Vict. c. 59))
South Sea Company Act 1726 (repealed)	13 Geo. 1. c. 8	24 April 1727
An Act to enable the South Sea Company, with the Licence and Consent of the East India Company, to take in Negroes within their Limits of Trade, and to deliver the same at Buenos Ayres. (Repealed by Statute Law Revision Act 1867 (30 & 31 Vict. c. 59))
Wigan to Preston Road Act 1726 (repealed)	13 Geo. 1. c. 9	24 April 1727
An Act for repairing, widening, and amending, the Roads from Wigan to Preston, in the County of Lancaster. (Repealed by Wigan to Preston Road Act 1779 (19 Geo. 3. c. 92))
Warrington and Wigan Road Act 1726 (repealed)	13 Geo. 1. c. 10	24 April 1727
An Act for repairing, widening, and amending, the Road from Warrington to Wigan, in the County of Lancaster. (Repealed by Warrington and Wigan Road Act 1813 (53 Geo. 3. c. cxxxi) and Warrington and Wigan Road (Lancashire) Act 1833 (3 & 4 Will. 4. c. lxxiv))
Cirencester Roads Act 1726 (repealed)	13 Geo. 1. c. 11	24 April 1727
An Act for repairing the Roads leading from Cirencester Town's-end to St. John's Bridge, in the County of Gloucester. (Repealed by Cirencester Roads Act 1825 (6 Geo. 4. c. cxliii))
Bristol Roads Act 1726 (repealed)	13 Geo. 1. c. 12	24 April 1727
An Act for amending the several Roads leading from the City of Bristol. (Repealed by Bristol Roads Act 1779 (19 Geo. 3. c. 117))
Chippenham Roads Act 1726 (repealed)	13 Geo. 1. c. 13	24 April 1727
An Act for repairing the Road leading from Studley Bridge, through Chippenham, in the County of Wilts, to the Top of Toghill, in the County of Gloucester. (Repealed by Roads from Studley Bridge and from Chippenham Act 1818 (58 Geo. 3. c. xliii))
Birmingham and Wednesbury Roads Act 1726 (repealed)	13 Geo. 1. c. 14	24 April 1727
An Act for repairing the several Roads leading from Birmingham, through the Town of Wednesbury, to a Place called High Bullen, and to Great Bridge, and from thence to the End of Gibbet Lane adjoining to the Township of Bilson, and from Great Bridge, through Dudley, to King's Winsford, and to the further End of Brittell Lane, in the Counties of Warwick, Stafford, and Worcester. (Repealed by Birmingham and Wednesbury Roads Act 1832 (2 & 3 Will. 4. c. vi) and Dudley and Brettell Lane District of Roads Act 1832 (2 & 3 Will. 4. c. lxxxiv))
Bromsgrove and Birmingham Roads Act 1726 (repealed)	13 Geo. 1. c. 15	24 April 1727
An Act for repairing the Roads leading from the Town of Bromsgrove to the Town of Dudley, in the County of Worcester, and from the said Town of Bromsgrove to the Town of Birmingham, in the County of Warwick. (Repealed by Road from Bromsgrove to Dudley Act 1816 (56 Geo. 3. c. lxvii) (Note: Incorrectly cited as "56 Geo. 3. c. lxviii" in the Chronological Table of the Statutes), Bromsgrove and Birmingham Road Act 1819 (59 Geo. 3. c. xlix) (Note: Incorrectly cited as "59 Geo. 3. c. lxix" in the Chronological Table of the Statutes), Birmingham and Bromsgrove Road Act 1831 (1 Will. 4. c. xi) and Dudley, Halesowen and Bromsgrove Road Act 1854 (17 & 18 Vict. c. cv))
Warminster Roads Act 1726 (repealed)	13 Geo. 1. c. 16	24 April 1727
An Act for repairing the several Roads leading from the Town of Warminster, in the County of Wilts. (Repealed by Warminster Roads Act 1815 (55 Geo. 3. c. lxxxvii))
Luton and Saint Albans Road Act 1726 (repealed)	13 Geo. 1. c. 17	24 April 1727
An Act for amending and repairing the Road from Luton, in the County of Bedford, to Westwood Gate, in the said County. (Repealed by Maulden Wood Corner and Westwood Gate Road (Bedfordshire) Act 1838 (1 & 2 Vict. c. xlix) and Luton District Road Act 1856 (19 & 20 Vict. c. cviii))
Drainage (Haddenham Level) Act 1726	13 Geo. 1. c. 18	24 April 1727
An Act for the effectual Draining and Preservation of Haddenham Levell, in the Isle of Ely.
Poor Relief (Gloucester) Act 1726	13 Geo. 1. c. 19	24 April 1727
An Act for repealing Part, and making more effectual the Residue, of an Act of Parliament, made in the First Year of the Reign of Her late Majesty Queen Anne, intituled, "An Act for the incorporating certain Persons, for the better providing for, and setting at Work, the Poor in the City of Gloucester." (Note: Gloucester Governor and Guardians of the Poor Act 1702 (1 Ann. St. 2. c. 11))
River Dun Navigation Act 1726	13 Geo. 1. c. 20	24 April 1727
An Act for improving the Navigation of the River Dunn, from a Place called Holmestile, in the Township of Doncaster, in the County of York, to Wilsick House, in the Parish of Barmby Dunn, in the said County.
National Debt Act 1726 (repealed)	13 Geo. 1. c. 21	15 May 1727
An Act for granting to His Majesty the Sum of Three Hundred and Seventy Thousand Pounds, to be raised by Loans or Exchequer Bills, to be charged on the Surplus Monies of the Duties on Coals and Culm, granted by an Act of the Fifth Year of His Majesty's Reign (Note: National Debt (No. 2) Act 1718 (5 Geo. 1. c. 9)) for a Term of Years, and since made perpetual. (Repealed by Statute Law Revision Act 1870 (33 & 34 Vict. c. 69))
South Sea Company (No. 2) Act 1726 (repealed)	13 Geo. 1. c. 22	15 May 1727
An Act for enlarging the Times for hearing and determining Claims by the Trustees for raising Money upon the Estates of the late Directors of the South Sea Company, and others; and for Relief of the Creditors of Robert Knight Esquire, late Cashier to the said Company; and for Relief of Persons who have entered Claims for contingent Debts and Incumbrances; and for giving Time to Ralph Gulston and other Creditors of Edward Gibbon Esquire to enter Claims before the said Trustees for a Debt specified in the Inventory of the said Edward Gibbon; and for empowering the Trustees to dismiss Claims for Want of Prosecution; and for applying the Produce of the said Estates for the Benefit of the South Sea Company. (Repealed by Statute Law Revision Act 1867 (30 & 31 Vict. c. 59))
Woollen Manufacture Act 1726 (repealed)	13 Geo. 1. c. 23	15 May 1727
An Act for the better Regulation of the Woollen Manufacture, and for preventing Disputes among the Persons concerned therein; and for limiting a Time for prosecuting for the Forfeiture appointed by an Act of the Twelfth Year of His Majesty's Reign, (Note: Woollen Manufactures Act 1725 (12 Geo. 1. c. 34)) in case of Payment of the Workmen's Wages in any other Manner than in Money. (Repealed by Woollen Trade Act 1833 (3 & 4 Will. 4. c. 28))
Dyeing Trade Act 1726 (repealed)	13 Geo. 1. c. 24	15 May 1727
An Act for preventing Frauds and Abuses in the Dying Trade. (Repealed by Dyeing Trade (Frauds) Act 1783 (23 Geo. 3. c. 15))
Importation (No. 2) Act 1726 (repealed)	13 Geo. 1. c. 25	15 May 1727
An Act for the free Importation of Cochineal, during the Time therein limited. (Repealed by Repeal of Acts Concerning Importation (No. 2) Act 1822 (3 Geo. 4. c. 42))
Linen and Hempen Manufactures (Scotland) Act 1726 (repealed)	13 Geo. 1. c. 26	15 May 1727
An Act for better Regulation of the Linen and Hempen Manufactures, in that Part of Great Britain called Scotland. (Repealed by National Galleries of Scotland Act 1906 (6 Edw. 7. c. 50))
Continuance of Laws, etc. Act 1726 (repealed)	13 Geo. 1. c. 27	15 May 1727
An Act for continuing the Laws therein mentioned, relating to Copper Bars exported; and for better preventing Frauds committed by Bankrupts; and for searching Drugs and Compositions for Medicines. (Repealed by Statute Law Revision Act 1867 (30 & 31 Vict. c. 59))
Crown Lands (Forfeited Estates) Act 1726 (repealed)	13 Geo. 1. c. 28	15 May 1727
An Act for Sale of such of the forfeited Estates in that Part of Great Britain called Scotland as remain unsold, and are vested in the Crown; and for determining such Claims, on the said Estates as, having been duly entered, remain undetermined. (Repealed by Statute Law Revision Act 1948 (11 & 12 Geo. 6. c. 62))
Qualification for Employments Act 1726 (repealed)	13 Geo. 1. c. 29	15 May 1727
An Act for allowing further Time to Persons on board the Fleet, or beyond the Seas, in His Majesty's Service, to qualify themselves for the legal Enjoyment of Offices and Employments; and for indemnifying such Persons as have omitted to qualify themselves within the Time limited for that Purpose; and for the better ascertaining such Time. (Repealed by Statute Law Revision Act 1867 (30 & 31 Vict. c. 59))
Fisheries (Scotland) Act 1726 (repealed)	13 Geo. 1. c. 30	15 May 1727
An Act for encouraging and promoting Fisheries, and other Manufactures and Improvements, in that Part of Great Britain called Scotland. (Repealed by National Galleries of Scotland Act 1906 (6 Edw. 7. c. 50))
Cranford to Maidenhead Road Act 1726 (repealed)	13 Geo. 1. c. 31	15 May 1727
An Act for repairing the Road from Cranford Bridge, in the County of Middlesex, to that End of Maidenhead Bridge which lies in the County of Bucks. (Repealed by Cranford Bridge and Maidenhead Bridge Road Act 1826 (7 Geo. 4. c. cxxxii))
Royston and Wandesford Bridge Road Act 1726 (repealed)	13 Geo. 1. c. 32	15 May 1727
An Act for the more effectual amending the Highways leading from Royston, in the County of Hertford, to Wansford Bridge, in the County of Huntingdon. (Repealed by Alconbury Hill and Norman Cross Roads (Huntingdonshire) Act 1798 (38 Geo. 3. c. xlviii), Road from Royston to Wandesford Bridge Act 1815 (55 Geo. 3. c. xxxv) and Royston and Wandesford Bridge Road Act 1822 (3 Geo. 4. c. lxviii))
Ouse Navigation Act 1726 or the Ouse Navigation Act 1727	13 Geo. 1. c. 33	15 May 1727
An Act for improving the Navigation of the River Ouze, in the County of York.
Rivers Wye and Lugg Navigation Act 1726	13 Geo. 1. c. 34	15 May 1727
An Act for explaining and amending an Act passed in the Seventh and Eighth Years of the Reign of His late Majesty King William the Third, intituled, "An Act for making navigable the Rivers Wye and Lug, in the County of Hereford;" (Note: Rivers Wye and Lugg Navigation Act 1695 (7 & 8 Will. 3. c. 14)) and for making the same more effectual.
Saint Catherine Cree Church Act 1726 (repealed)	13 Geo. 1. c. 35	15 May 1727
An Act for establishing a certain Provision, for maintaining the Curate of the Parish of Saint Katherine Cree Church, alias Christ Church, London; and for repairing and supporting the Chancel of the said Parish Church. (Repealed by City of London (Various Powers) Act 1950 (14 Geo. 6. c. v))

=== Private acts ===
Short title	Citation	Royal assent
Long title
Crespin's Naturalization Act 1726	13 Geo. 1. c. 1 Pr.	20 February 1727
An Act for naturalizing Daniel Crespin.
Handel's Naturalisation Act 1727	13 Geo. 1. c. 2 Pr.	20 February 1727
An Act for naturalizing Louis Sechehaye, George Frideric Handel, Anthony Furstenau and Michael Schlegel.
Little Rissington Inclosure Act 1726	13 Geo. 1. c. 3 Pr.	24 March 1727
An Act for exchanging, enclosing, and reducing into Severalty, the Lands in the Common Fields, Common Meadows, Mowing Ground, Pasture, and Feeding Grounds, and all other the Lands lying Open, in the Parish of Little Rissington, in the County of Gloucester.
Brodnax's Name Act 1726	13 Geo. 1. c. 4 Pr.	24 March 1727
An Act to enable Thomas Brodnax Esquire, and the Heirs and Issue of his Body, to take and use the Surname of May.
Gounter's Name Act 1726	13 Geo. 1. c. 5 Pr.	24 March 1727
An Act to enable Charles Nicoll, alias Gounter, Esquire, and his Issue Male, to take and use the Surname of Nicoll, pursuant to the Deed of Settlement of William Nicoll Esquire, deceased.
Disbrow's Name Act 1726	13 Geo. 1. c. 6 Pr.	24 March 1727
An Act for enabling John Disbrow Gentleman, and his Issue, to take and use the Surname of Spencer.
Lindberg's Naturalization Act 1726	13 Geo. 1. c. 7 Pr.	24 March 1727
An Act for naturalizing Abraham Lindberg and others.
Duplessis's Naturalization Act 1726	13 Geo. 1. c. 8 Pr.	24 March 1727
An Act for naturalizing. Louis Aubert Duplessis.
Guillemau's Naturalization Act 1726	13 Geo. 1. c. 9 Pr.	24 March 1727
An Act for naturalizing Lewis Guillemau.
Lionel Duke of Dorset and Henry Smith's estates: enabling exchanges to be made of lands near Knole Park (Kent) for a rent charge issuing out of manor of Heddington (Hundred of Bullingdon) (Oxfordshire).	13 Geo. 1. c. 10 Pr.	24 April 1727
An Act to enable an Exchange to be made between Lionel Duke of Dorset, and the Trustees of Henry Smith Esquire, deceased, of Sixteen Acres Seventeen Perches and an Half of Land and Coppice, lying near Knole Park, in the County of Kent, of the Value of Eight Pounds per Annum, for a Rent Charge of Ten Pounds a Year, Part of a Fee Farm Rent of Forty Pounds per Annum, issuing out of the Manor of Heddington, with the Hundred of Bullingdon, in the County of Oxford.
Vesting rectories, parsonages, churches and chapels of Breamore, South Charford, Hale, Rockbourn, Whitsbury and Quidesley (Hants.) in new trustees to execute powers and trusts contained in an indenture of 15th May 1683.	13 Geo. 1. c. 11 Pr.	24 April 1727
An Act to vest the several Rectories, Parsonages, Churches, and Chapels, of Breamore, South Charford, Hale, Rockbourn, Whitsbury, and Quidesley, with the Glebe Land and Appurtenances thereunto belonging, in new Trustees, to put in Execution certain Trusts and Powers contained in an Indenture dated the Fifteenth Day of May One Thousand Six Hundred and Eighty-three.
Appointing Commissioners to divide lands in Scarcliffe and Palterton (Derbyshire) among the proprietors to inclose the same.	13 Geo. 1. c. 12 Pr.	24 April 1727
An Act for appointing Commissioners, to make a Division of certain Common Fields and Wastes, in the Townships of Scarcliffe and Palterton, in Derbyshire, among the Proprietors, in order to enclose the same.
Hucclecote Inclosure Act 1726	13 Geo. 1. c. 13 Pr.	24 April 1727
An Act for enclosing the Common Fields in Hucklecott, in the Parish of Churchdowne, in the County of Gloucester.
Vesting in trustees manors of Great Hallingbury, Little Hallingbury, Wallbury, Monkbury, the forest or chase in Hatfield (Essex), manor of Bluntshall (Suffolk) and manor of Winterton (Norfolk), to be sold for payment of debts to which they are subject from Sir Edward Turnour's will and purchasing and settling land with any remaining proceeds as directed by will.	13 Geo. 1. c. 14 Pr.	24 April 1727
An Act to vest the Manors of Great Hallingbury and Little Hallingbury, Wallbury, and Monkbury, and the Forest or Chace in the Parish of Hatfield, in the County of Essex; and also the Manor or Lordship of Bluntshall in the County of Suffolk, and the Manor or Lordship of Winterton in the County of Norfolk, in Trustee, to be sold, for the Payment of Debts, to which the same are subject by virtue of the Will of Sir Edward Turnour Knight, deceased; and for laying out the Surplus of the Money, if any, arising by such Sale, in the Purchase of Lands, to be settled to the Uses mentioned in the Will of the said Sir Edward Turnour.
Breton's Estate Act 1726	13 Geo. 1. c. 15 Pr.	24 April 1727
An Act for vesting Part of the Estate of Moyle Breton Esquire in Trustees, to be sold, for raising Three Thousand Pounds, charged on other Part of the same Estate; and for other Purposes therein mentioned.
Yate's Estate Act 1726	13 Geo. 1. c. 16 Pr.	24 April 1727
An Act for the Sale of certain Houses and Lands, in the Town and Liberties of Bridgnorth, in the County of Salop, contained in the Marriage Settlement of John Yate Gentleman; and for the purchasing and settling other Lands, of as great Yearly Value, to the same Uses.
Addington Rectory (Buckinghamshire): exchange of tithes and glebe lands of and belonging to the rectory for other lands in Addington to be settled on the rector and his successors, and other provisions.	13 Geo. 1. c. 17 Pr.	24 April 1727
An Act for exchanging the Tithes and Glebe Lands of and belonging to the Rectory of the Church of Addington, in the County of Bucks, for other Lands in Addington aforesaid, to be settled on the Rector of the said Church and his Successors; and for other Purposes therein mentioned.
Yale's Estate Act 1726	13 Geo. 1. c. 18 Pr.	24 April 1727
An Act for vesting the Real Estate late of Elihu Yale Esquire deceased, in the County of Denbigh, in Trustees, to be sold; and for applying One Third Part of the Monies arising by Sale thereof, according to the Will of Ursula Yale his Daughter, deceased; and the other Two Thirds for the Benefit of his Two other Coheirs.
Goulston's Estate Act 1726	13 Geo. 1. c. 19 Pr.	24 April 1727
An Act for repealing a Power of Revocation in the Settlement made on the Marriage of Francis Goulston Esquire; and for establishing and vesting a new Power instead thereof.
Confirmation of a conveyance of the manor of the rectory of Great Stoughton (Huntingdonshire) to Sir Baldwin Conyers, in exchange for an annuity granted by him to the vicar and his successors.	13 Geo. 1. c. 20 Pr.	24 April 1727
An Act for confirming a Conveyance of the Manor of the Rectory of Great Stoughton, in the County of Huntingdon, unto Sir Baldwyn Conyers Baronet, in Exchange for an Annuity granted by him to the Vicar of Great Stoughton aforesaid, and his Successors.
Amphlett's Estate Act 1726	13 Geo. 1. c. 21 Pr.	24 April 1727
An Act for vesting certain Copyhold and other Lands in John Amphlett Esquire, in Lieu of the Freehold Lands agreed to be purchased and settled on him by the Marriage Articles of Joseph Amphlett Esquire, his late Father, with Anne his Wife, both deceased; and for making Provision for the Younger Children of that Marriage.
Thomas Rand's Estate Act 1726	13 Geo. 1. c. 22 Pr.	24 April 1727
An Act for Sale of Two undivided Third Parts of the Manor of Weeton, and other Lands in Holderness, Part of the settled Estate of Thomas Rand; and for applying the Money arising by such Sale, in the Purchase of an entire Estate, to be settled to the same Uses.
Norton's Estate Act 1726	13 Geo. 1. c. 23 Pr.	24 April 1727
An Act for vesting the Real and Personal Estate of William Norton Esquire, deceased, in Trustees, for the Purposes therein mentioned.
Southcott's Estate Act 1726	13 Geo. 1. c. 24 Pr.	24 April 1727
An Act for the Sale of the Manor of Albury, in the Parish of Mestham, and the Manor of Chaldon, and other Lands, in the County of Surrey, Part of the Estate of John Southcott Esquire, for the Purposes therein mentioned; and for settling the Capital Messuage of Wirham Place, and other Lands, in the County of Essex, of the same Value, Part of the Estate of Sir Edward Southcott Knight, Father of the said John Southcott, to the like Uses.
Sainthill's Estate Act 1726	13 Geo. 1. c. 25 Pr.	24 April 1727
An Act for settling certain Lands and Tenements of Edward Sainthill the Elder Esquire, therein mentioned, pursuant to an Agreement made on the Marriage of Edward Sainthill his Son, with Frances the Daughter of Sir Walter Yonge Baronet.
Wall's Estate Act 1726	13 Geo. 1. c. 26 Pr.	24 April 1727
An Act for Sale of Part of the Estate of John Wall, for Payment of Debts; and for settling other Part of his Estate, for the Education and Maintenance of his only Son.
Vesting in the Archbishop of Canterbury and the Bishop of Elysums givenfor the augmentation of the maintenance of poor vicars within the dioceses of Canterbury and Ely, and empowering them to lay out the same in the purchase of lands to be vested in other trustees for the same purposes.	13 Geo. 1. c. 27 Pr.	15 May 1727
An Act for vesting several Sums of Money in the Archbishop of Canterbury and the Bishop of Ely, given for the Augmentation of the Maintenance of poor Vicars within the Dioceses of Canterbury and Ely; and to empower them to lay out the same in the Purchase of Lands, to be vested in other Trustees, for the same Purposes.
Lord Kenmare's Estate Act 1726	13 Geo. 1. c. 28 Pr.	15 May 1727
An Act for Sale of Part of the Estate of Valentine Brown Esquire, commonly called Lord Kenmare in the Kingdom of Ireland, for Payment of Debts and Incumbrances affecting the same.
Lord Southwell's Estate Act 1726	13 Geo. 1. c. 29 Pr.	15 May 1727
An Act to enable Thomas now Lord Southwell, and his Trustees, to raise Money, by making Leases for Lives renewable for ever, and Fee-farms, and by Sale or Mortgage of certain Lands and Hereditaments, in the County of Limerick, in the Kingdom of Ireland, for Payment of Debts and Legacies; and for other Purposes therein mentioned.
Everard's Estate Act 1726	13 Geo. 1. c. 30 Pr.	15 May 1727
An Act for vesting certain Manors, Lands, and Hereditaments, in the Kingdom of Ireland, the Estate of Sir Redmond Everard Baronet, in Trustees, to be sold, for raising Money, to discharge Incumbrances affecting the same; and for other Purposes.
Enabling Mary O'Gara to sue for her jointure lands.	13 Geo. 1. c. 31 Pr.	15 May 1727
An Act to enable Mary O'Gara Widow to sue for her Jointure Lands.
Thornton's Estate Act 1726	13 Geo. 1. c. 32 Pr.	15 May 1727
An Act for vesting in Trustees a Messuage and Garden, in the Parish of St. Katherine Coleman, London, the Estate of Robert Thornton and Hannah his Wife, to be sold, on settling an Estate of a greater Value to the same Uses.
Confirmation of the sale by Anthony Palmer to Lewis Buckle of copyhold lands and hereditaments, parcel of the manor of East Meon (Hampshire) and settling others, parcel of the same manor, of equal or greater value to the same uses.	13 Geo. 1. c. 33 Pr.	15 May 1727
An Act for confirming a Sale made by Anthony Palmer to Lewis Buckle Esquire, of certain Copyhold Lands and Hereditaments, Parcel of the Manor of Eastmeon, in the County of Southampton; and for settling other Copyhold Lands and Hereditaments, Parcel of the same Manor, of as great or greater Value, to the same Uses as the said Lands so sold now stand limited.
Kinaston's Estate Act 1726	13 Geo. 1. c. 34 Pr.	15 May 1727
An Act for Sale of Part of the Estate of William Kinaston Esquire; and for settling other Part thereof to the Uses therein mentioned.
Dunne's Estate Act 1726	13 Geo. 1. c. 35 Pr.	15 May 1727
An Act to enable Daniel Dunne Esquire, by Sale or Mortgage of Part of his Estate, to raise Money, to pay off and discharge the Portions of his Brothers and Sister, and a Mortgage of One Thousand Eight Hundred Seventy-seven Pounds affecting the same.
Vesting quantities of South Sea stock and annuities in trustees for payment of Charles Loundes' debts and for his and his wife's relief and benefit.	13 Geo. 1. c. 36 Pr.	15 May 1727
An Act for vesting several Quantities and Parcels of South Sea Stock and South Sea Annuities in Trustees, for Payment of the Debts of Charles Lowndes Gentleman; and for the Benefit and Relief of him and Rebecca his Wife.

=== Sources ===
- Pickering, Danby, ed. (1765). "Anno decimo tertio Georgii I". The Statutes at Large. Vol. 15: From the Ninth Year of King George I to the Second Year of King George II. Cambridge: Joseph Bentham. pp. 368–437 – via Internet Archive.
- Pickering, Danby, ed. (1765). "Anno decimo tertio Georgii I". The Statutes at Large. Vol. 15: From the Ninth Year of King George I to the Second Year of King George II. Cambridge: Joseph Bentham. pp. 368–437 – via Google Books.
- Pickering, Danby, ed. (1765). "Anno decimo tertio Georgii I". The Statutes at Large. Vol. 15: From the Ninth Year of King George I to the Second Year of King George II. Cambridge: Joseph Bentham. pp. 368–437 – via Internet Archive.
- Journals of the House of Commons. Vol. 20. London: His Majesty's Stationery Office. 1803. pp. 707–866 – via Google Books.
- Chronological Table of and Index to the Statutes. Vol. 1: To the End of the Session 59 Vict. Sess. 2 (1895) (13th ed.). London: Her Majesty's Stationery Office. 1896. p. 98 – via Google Books.

== See also ==
- List of acts of the Parliament of Great Britain
