= Test Acts 1673 and 1678 =

1673 series of English penal laws

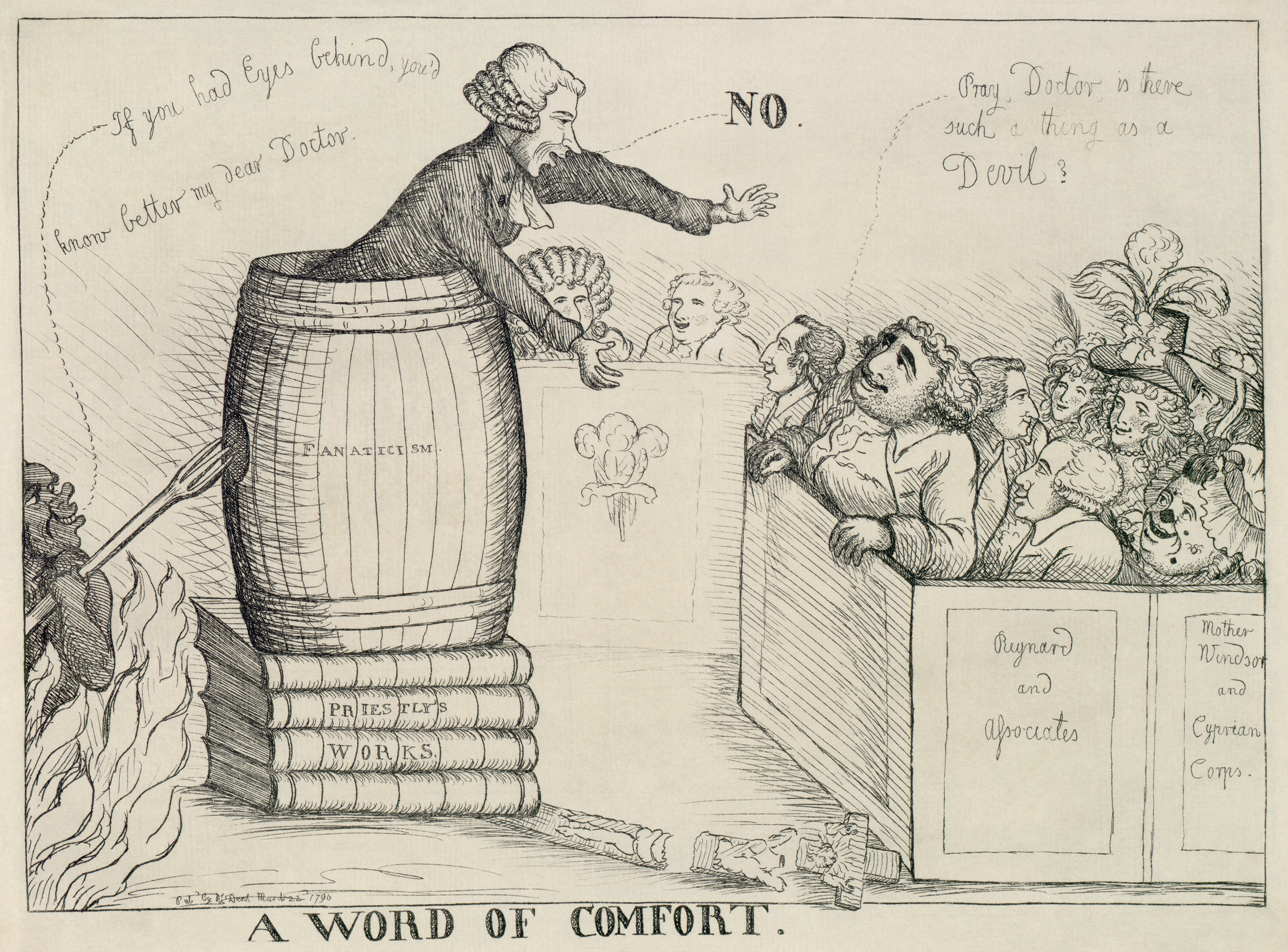
A 1790 cartoon satirizing the efforts of Charles James Fox and Unitarian theologian Joseph Priestley to get the Test Acts repealed. Priestly preaches from atop a pile of his own works, in a pulpit inscribed "FANATICISM", to Fox seated in a box pew. Fox asks, "Pray, Doctor is there such a thing as a Devil?" Priestley responds "No", however the devil himself announces, "If you had eyes behind, you'd know better my dear Doctor".

The Test Acts were a series of penal laws originating in Restoration England, passed by the Parliament of England, that served as a religious test for public office in England and Wales, which imposed various civil disabilities on Roman Catholics and nonconformist Protestants. The underlying principle was that only people taking communion in the established Church of England were eligible for public employment, and the severe penalties pronounced against recusants, whether Catholic or nonconformist, were affirmations of this principle.

Although theoretically encompassing all who refuse to comply with Anglicanism in a dragnet approach, in practice the nonconformist Protestants had many defenders in Parliament and were often exempted from some of these laws through the regular passage of Acts of Indemnity: in particular, the Indemnity Act 1727 relieved nonconformists from the requirements in the Test Act 1673 and the Corporation Act 1661 that public office holders must have taken the sacrament of the Lord's Supper in an Anglican church.

Similar laws were introduced in Scotland with respect to the Presbyterian Church of Scotland and also in Ireland, where the minority Anglican Church of Ireland had penal laws set up in its favour to allow the Anglo-Irish minority to maintain control of land, law and politics as part of the Protestant Ascendancy.

== Corporation Act 1661 ==
The Naturalisation and Restoration of Blood Act 1609 (7 Jas. 1. c. 2) provided that all such as were naturalised or restored in blood should receive the sacrament of the Lord's Supper (repealed by Naturalization Act 1870 (33 & 34 Vict. c. 14)) but this did not affect most people born in England.

It was not, however, until the reign of Charles II that actually receiving communion in the Church of England was made a precondition for holding public office. The earliest imposition of this test was by the Corporation Act 1661 (13 Cha. 2 St. 2. c. 1) requiring that, besides taking the Oath of Supremacy, all members of corporations (i.e. municipal authorities) were, within one year after election, to receive the sacrament of the Lord's Supper according to the rites of the Church of England. This was targeted at Presbyterians and other non-conformists following the English Civil War and Restoration, though also affected Roman Catholics.

== Test Act 1673 ==
Popish Recusants Act 1672
- Act of Parliament
- Parliament of England
- Long title: An Act for preventing Dangers which may happen from Popish Recusants.
- Citation: 25 Cha. 2. c. 2
- Territorial extent: England and Wales

Dates
- Royal assent: 29 March 1673
- Commencement: 4 February 1673 (Note: Start of session.)
- Repealed: 28 July 1863
Other legislation
Amended by	Parliament Act 1678; Qualification for Employments Act 1726; Indemnity Act 1742; Sacramental Test Act 1828; Roman Catholics Act 1844
Repealed by	Statute Law Revision Act 1863
Relates to	Indemnity Act 1727

Status: Repealed

Text of statute as originally enacted

The Corporation Act 1661 (13 Cha. 2 St. 2. c. 1) was followed by the Test Act 1673 (25 Cha. 2. c. 2) (the long title of which is "An act for preventing dangers which may happen from popish recusants"). This act enforced upon all persons filling any office, civil, military or religious, the obligation of taking the oaths of supremacy and allegiance and subscribing to a declaration against transubstantiation and also of receiving the sacrament within three months after admittance to office. The oath for the Test Act 1673 was:

I, N, do declare that I do believe that there is not any transubstantiation in the sacrament of the Lord's Supper, or in the elements of the bread and wine, at or after the consecration thereof by any person whatsoever.

The act was passed in the parliamentary session that began on 4 February 1673 (Gregorian calendar). The act is, however, dated 1672 in some accounts due to the Julian calendar then in force in England.

One of the immediate reasons that the "Country Party" (proto-Whigs) in Parliament pushed for this was to break up the Cabal ministry — members of the Court Party of powerful statement under Charles II, who had divergent religious interests — the Catholic Lord Clifford could not accept this oath which ran contrary to his beliefs, so resigned his position in government and the Cabal ministry completely unravelled by 1674. Foreign nations and their agents also had a vested interest in lobbying either way on the issue, as the leaders of the Cabal ministry (Arlington and Clifford) were allied with Catholic France against the Protestant Dutch in the Third Anglo-Dutch War; after the fall of the Cabal ministry, the pro-Dutch First Danby ministry came to power. In addition to this, 1673 was also the year that it became public knowledge that James, Duke of York, heir to the throne, had converted to Catholicism.

The whole act was repealed by section 1 of, and the schedule to, the Statute Law Revision Act 1863 (26 & 27 Vict. c. 125).

== Test Act 1678 ==
Parliament Act 1678
- Act of Parliament
- Parliament of England
- Long title: An Act for the more effectuall preserving the Kings Person and Government by disableing Papists from sitting in either House of Parlyament.
- Citation: 30 Cha. 2. St. 2.
- Territorial extent: England and Wales

Dates
- Royal assent: 30 November 1678
- Commencement: 1 December 1678 (Note: Section 1.)
- Repealed: 30 April 1866
Other legislation
Amends	Popish Recusants Act 1672
Amended by	Religious Disabilities Act 1846
Repealed by	Parliamentary Oaths Act 1866

Status: Repealed

Text of statute as originally enacted

Initially, the act did not extend to peers, but in 1678 the act was extended by a further act, the Parliament Act 1678 (30 Cha. 2. St. 2), which required that all peers and members of the House of Commons should make a declaration against transubstantiation, invocation of saints, and the sacrificial nature of the Mass. The effect of this was to exclude Catholics from both houses, and in particular the "Five Popish Lords" from the House of Lords, a change motivated largely by the alleged Popish Plot. The Lords deeply resented this interference with their membership; they delayed passage of the act as long as possible, and managed to greatly weaken it by including an exemption for the future James II, effective head of the Catholic nobility, at whom it was largely aimed.

== Scotland ==
In Scotland, a religious test was imposed immediately after the Reformation, and by the Religion Act 1567 (April c. 2 (S)) no one was to be appointed to a public office or to be a notary who did not profess Calvinism. The Scottish Test Act (c. 6 (S)) was passed in 1681 but rescinded by the Confession of Faith Ratification Act 1690. Later attempts to exclude Scotland from the English Test Acts were rejected by the Parliament of Scotland. In 1707, anyone bearing office in any university, college or school in Scotland was to profess and subscribe to the Confession of Faith. All persons were to be free of any oath or test contrary to or inconsistent with the Protestant religion and Presbyterian Church government. The reception of the Eucharist was never a part of the test in Scotland as it was in England and Ireland. The necessity for subscription to the Confession of Faith by persons holding a university office was removed by the Universities (Scotland) Act 1853. The act provided that in place of subscription every person appointed to a university office was to subscribe a declaration according to the form in the act, promising not to teach any opinions opposed to the divine authority of Scripture or to the Confession of Faith, and to do nothing to the prejudice of the Church of Scotland or its doctrines and privileges. All tests were finally abolished by the Universities (Scotland) Act 1889.

== Repeals ==
Test Abolition Act 1867 (Note: The citation of this act by this short title was authorised by section 1 of, and the first schedule to, the Short Titles Act 1896. Due to the repeal of those provisions it is now authorised by section 19(2) of the Interpretation Act 1978.)
- Act of Parliament
- Parliament of the United Kingdom
- Long title: An Act to abolish a certain Declaration, commonly called the Declaration against Transubstantiation, the Invocation of the Saints, and the Sacrifice of the Mass, as practised in the Church of Rome; and to render it unnecessary to take, make, or subscribe the same as a Qualification for the Exercise or Enjoyment of any Civil Office, Franchise, or Right.
- Citation: 30 & 31 Vict. c. 62
- Territorial extent: United Kingdom

Dates
- Royal assent: 25 July 1867
- Commencement: 25 July 1867 (Note: The Acts of Parliament (Commencement) Act 1793.)
- Repealed: 16 November 1989
Other legislation
Repealed by	Statute Law (Repeals) Act 1989

Status: Repealed

Text of statute as originally enacted

The necessity of receiving the sacrament as a qualification for office was repealed in Ireland in 1780 by the Protestant Dissenters Relief Act 1779 (19 & 20 Geo. 3. c. 6 (I)), and by the Sacramental Test Act 1828 in England and Wales. Provisions requiring the taking of oaths and declarations against transubstantiation were repealed by the Roman Catholic Relief Act 1829 (10 Geo. 4. c. 7). Sir Robert Peel took the lead for the government in the repeal and collaborated with Anglican Church leaders. The application of the 1828 and 1829 acts to Irish acts was uncertain and so the Test Abolition Act 1867 (30 & 31 Vict. c. 62) repeated the 1829 repeal more explicitly.

The whole of the 1672 act was repealed by section 1 of, and the schedule to, the Statute Law Revision Act 1966, which came into force on 10 March 1966.

The 1661 and 1678 acts were repealed by the Promissory Oaths Act 1871 (34 & 35 Vict. c. 48) and the Parliamentary Oaths Act 1866 (29 & 30 Vict. c. 19) respectively. Religious tests for officers of the ancient universities were repealed by the Universities Tests Act 1871(34 & 35 Vict. c. 26) for England, the University of Dublin Tests Act 1873 (36 & 37 Vict. c. 21), and the Universities (Scotland) Act 1889 (52 & 53 Vict. c. 55).
