= Joseph Jacobs =

Australian-born folklorist, literary critic and historian (1854–1916)

- Photograph of Jacobs taken in 1900
- Born: 29 August 1854; Sydney, Colony of New South Wales
- Died: 30 January 1916 (aged 61); Yonkers, New York, U.S.
- Education: University of Sydney; St John's College, Cambridge; University of Berlin
- Occupations: Folklorist; critic; historian
- Writing career
- Subjects: Indo-European fairy tales; Jewish history

Joseph Jacobs (29 August 1854 – 30 January 1916) was an Australian-born folklorist, literary critic and historian who became a notable collector and publisher of English folklore.

Born in Sydney to a Jewish family, his work went on to popularise some of the world's best known versions of English fairy tales including "Jack and the Beanstalk", "Goldilocks and the Three Bears", "The Three Little Pigs", "Jack the Giant Killer" and "The History of Tom Thumb". He published his English fairy tale collections English Fairy Tales in 1890 and More English Fairy Tales in 1893. (Note: Contemporary newspaper records show that the most or all of the Fairy Tales collections were published in the autumn for the Christmas gift-book season, in both Britain and the United States. However, some have been catalogued as publications of the following year from their title pages.) He published European, Jewish, Celtic, and Indian fairy tales, which made him one of the most popular English-language fairy tale writers. Jacobs was also an editor for journals and books on the subject of folklore which included editing the Fables of Bidpai and the Fables of Aesop, as well as articles on the migration of Jewish folklore. He also edited editions of The Thousand and One Nights. He went on to join The Folklore Society in England and became an editor of the society journal Folklore. Joseph Jacobs also contributed to The Jewish Encyclopedia.

During his lifetime, Jacobs came to be regarded as one of the foremost experts on English folklore.

== Biography ==
=== Early life ===
Jacobs was born in Sydney, New South Wales, on 29 August 1854. He was the sixth surviving son of John Jacobs, a publican who had emigrated from London in around 1837, and his wife Sarah, née Myers. He did not finish his studies, instead leaving for Britain at the age of 18.

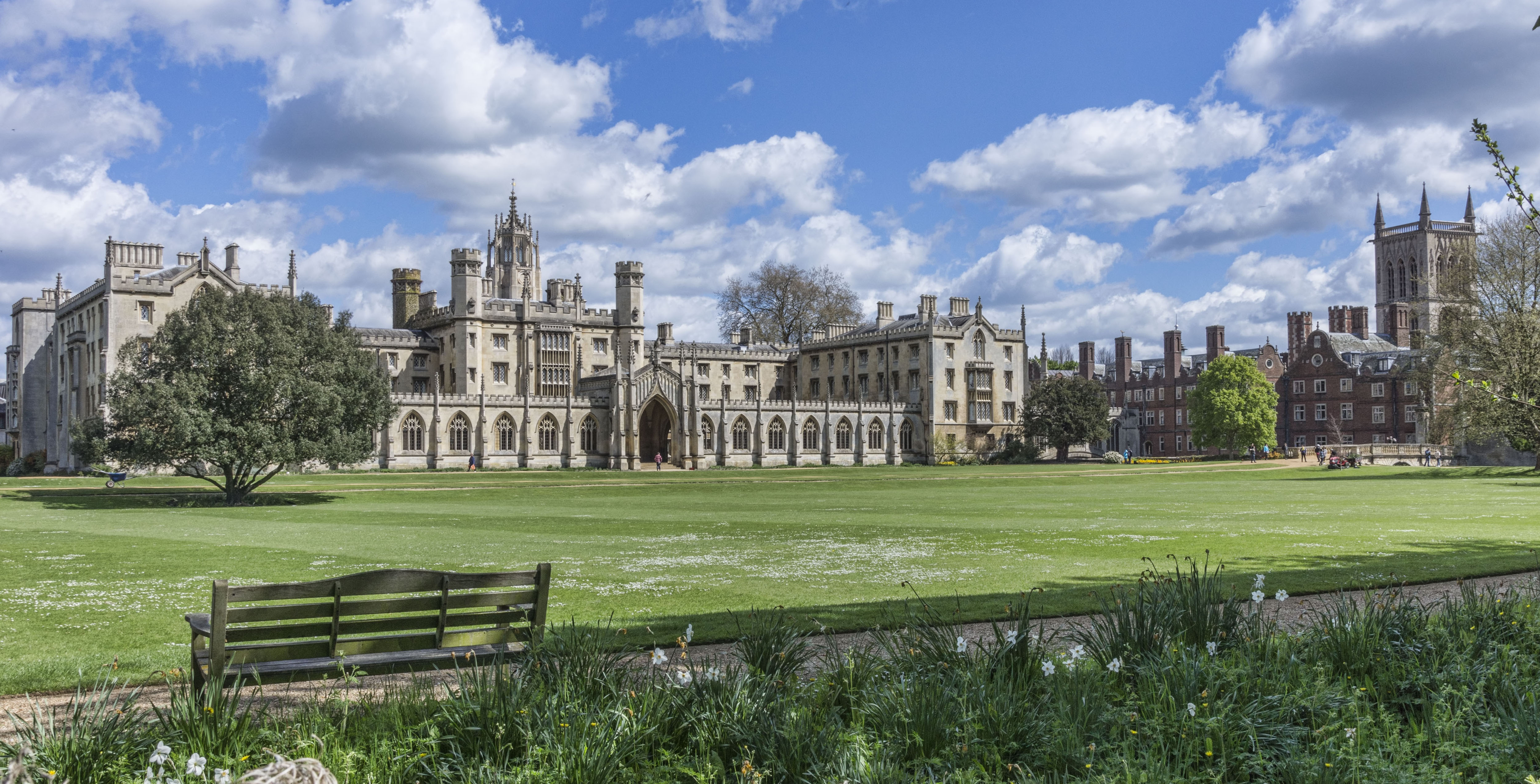
Jacobs attained his BA from St John's College, Cambridge.

He then studied at St John's College, Cambridge, where he gained a BA in 1876. At university he demonstrated a particular interest in mathematics, philosophy, literature, history, and anthropology. While he was in Britain Jacobs became aware of widespread antisemitism; to counter this he wrote an essay, "Mordecai", which was published in Macmillan's Magazine in June 1877 Later in 1877 he moved to Berlin to study Jewish literature and bibliography under Moritz Steinschneider, and Jewish philosophy and ethnology under Moritz Lazarus.

Jacobs then returned to Britain and studied anthropology under Francis Galton. At this point he began to further develop his interest in folklore. From 1878 to 1884 he served as secretary of the Society of Hebrew Literature. He was concerned by the antisemitic pogroms in the Russian Empire and in January 1882 wrote letters on the subject to The Times of London. This helped to raise public attention to the issue, resulting in the formation of the Mansion House Fund and Committee, of which he was secretary from 1882 to 1900. He was the honorary secretary of the literature and art committee of the Anglo-Jewish Historical Exhibition held in the Royal Albert Hall in London in 1887, and with Lucien Wolf he compiled the exhibition catalogue.

In 1888 Jacobs visited Spain to examine old Jewish manuscripts there. The Royal Academy of History at Madrid elected him a corresponding member.

In 1891 he returned to the theme of Russian antisemitism in a short book, The Persecution of the Jews in Russia, which was published first in London and then in the United States by the Jewish Publication Society of America. In 1896 Jacobs began publication of the annual Jewish Year Book, continuing the series until 1899, after which it was continued by others. He was also President of the Jewish Historical Society.

=== Later life ===
In 1896 Jacobs visited the United States to deliver lectures on "The Philosophy of Jewish History" at Gratz College in Philadelphia, as well as to groups of the Council of Jewish Women in New York, Philadelphia and Chicago. In 1900 he was invited to serve as revising editor for the Jewish Encyclopedia, which included entries from 600 contributors. He moved to the United States to take on this task. He also involved himself in the American Jewish Historical Society, became a working member of the Jewish Publication Society's publication committee. and taught at the Jewish Theological Seminary of America.

Jacobs married Georgina Horne, and fathered two sons and a daughter. In 1900, when he became revising editor of the Jewish Encyclopedia, based in New York, he settled permanently in the United States.

He died on 30 January 1916 at his home in Yonkers, New York, aged 62.

== Career ==
1919 edition of The Book of Wonder Voyages (1896)

Jacobs was a student of anthropology at the Statistical Laboratory at University College London in the 1880s under Francis Galton. His Studies in Jewish Statistics: Social, Vital and Anthropometric (1891) made his reputation as the first proponent of what was then called "Jewish race science".

== Folklore ==
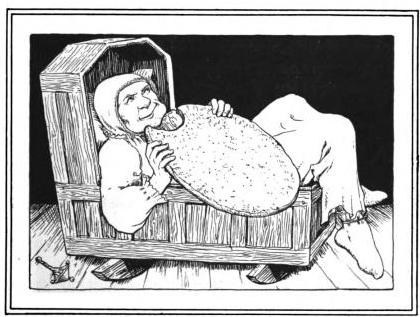
Illustration of "A Legend of Knockmany" by John D. Batten for Celtic Fairy Tales (1892)

Jacobs edited the journal Folklore from 1899 to 1900 and from 1890 to 1916 he edited multiple collections of fairy tales that were published with illustrations by John Dickson Batten: English Fairy Tales, Celtic Fairy Tales, Indian Fairy Tales, More English Fairy Tales, More Celtic Fairy Tales (all 1890 to 1895) and Europa's Fairy Book (also issued as European Folk and Fairy Tales) in 1916. He was inspired in this by the Brothers Grimm and the romantic nationalism common in folklorists of his age; he wished English children to have access to English fairy tales, whereas they were chiefly reading French and German tales; in his own words, "What Perrault began, the Grimms completed."

Although he collected many tales under the name of fairy tales, many of them are unusual sorts of tales. Binnorie (in English Fairy Tales) and Tamlane (in More English Fairy Tales) are prose versions of ballads, The Old Woman and Her Pig (in English Fairy Tales) is a nursery rhyme, Henny Penny (in English Fairy Tales) is a fable, and The Buried Moon (in More English Fairy Tales) has mythic overtones to an extent unusual in fairy tales. According to his own analysis of English Fairy Tales, "Of the eighty-seven tales contained in my two volumes, thirty-eight are Märchen proper, ten sagas or legends, nineteen drolls, four cumulative stories, six beast tales, and ten nonsense stories."

== Reception and legacy ==
During his lifetime Jacobs came to be regarded as "one of the leading English authorities" on folklore, and "the leading authority on fairy tales and the migration of fables". Writing in 1954, O. Somech Philips stated that, while Jacobs accomplished many things in his life, it was as a folklorist that "people remember him best".

Writing Jacobs's obituary for The American Jewish Year Book, Mayer Sulzberger characterised him as "one of the important figures in the Jewry of our age", adding that he was "in himself a type of the humanity and universality of the Jewish people". Sulzberger praised Jacobs's literary style, commenting that he "wrote with ease and grace", and "might have attained a high place in the illustrious roll of honor of Britain's literary worthies" if he had pursued a career in literature. Sulzberger described him as having "a noble nature, incapable of envy", as well an "insatiable thirst for knowledge"; he was "always ready to welcome a fellow-inquirer."

After his death his stories were republished, including in the 1918 book English fairy tales by Flora Annie Steel with illustrations from Arthur Rackham.

== Works ==
Sulzberger included a list of his books in his obituary:

=== Jewish and biblical studies ===
- The Jewish Question, 1875–1884: Bibliographical Hand-list, Trübner, 1885
- Studies in Jewish Statistics, 1891
- The Jews of Angevin England: Documents and Records, from the Latin and Hebrew Sources, Printed and Manuscript, 1893
- Studies in Biblical Archaeology, 1894
- An Inquiry into the Sources of the History of the Jews in Spain, 1894
- As Others Saw Him – A Retrospect A.D. 54, 1895
- Barlaam and Josaphat – English Lives of Buddha, 1896
- The Jewish Encyclopedia, from 1900, as a contributor
- Jewish Contributions to Civilisation – An Estimate, 1919

=== Literary criticism and studies ===
- George Eliot, Matthew Arnold, Browning, Newman: Essays and Reviews from "The Athenaeum", 1891
- Tennyson and "In Memoriam": An Appreciation and a Study, 1892
- Literary Studies, 1896

=== Fables, folk and fairy Tales ===
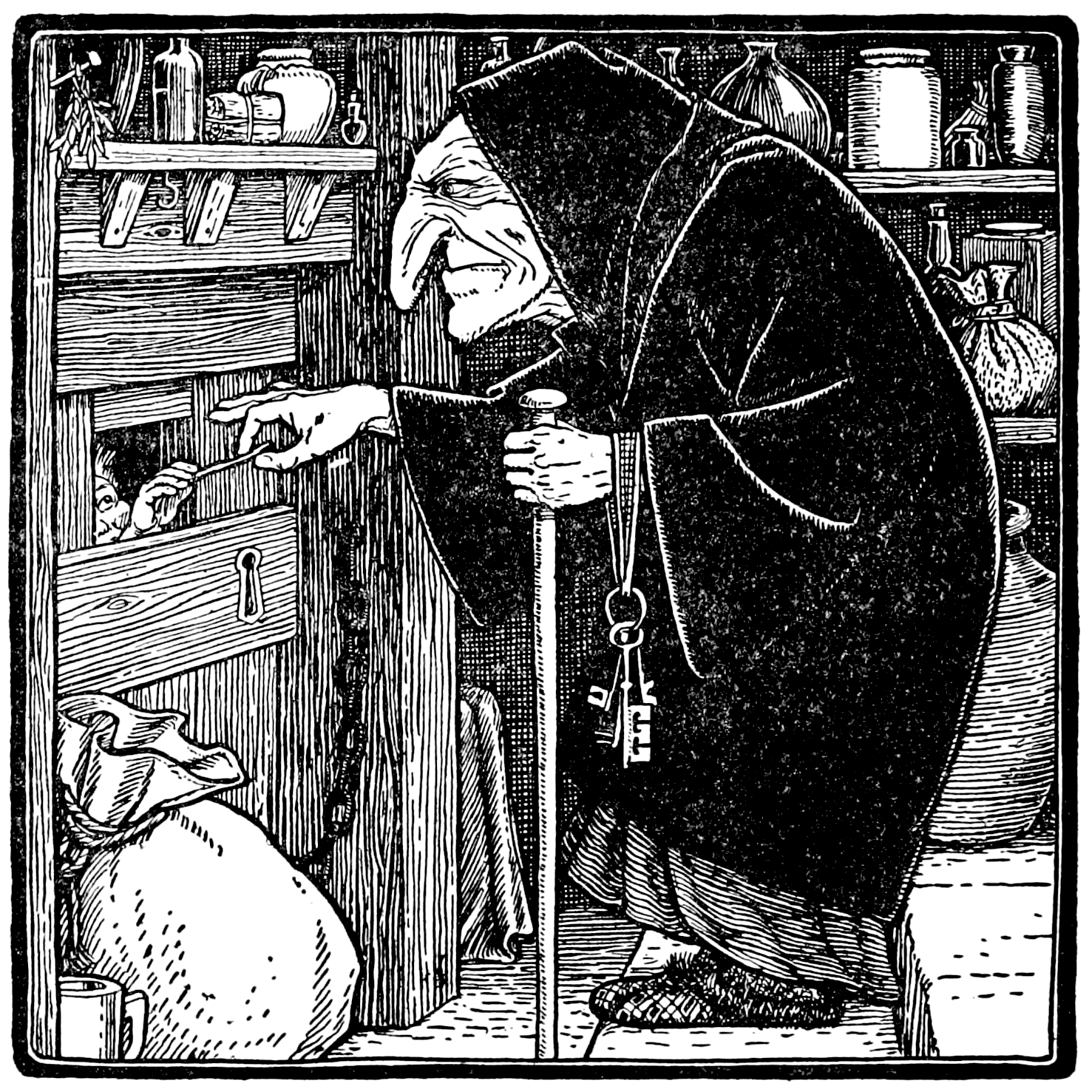
Illustration to Europa's Fairy Book

As editor

- Earliest English Version of the Fables of Bidpai, David Nutt, 1888, reprint of Thomas North's The Morall Philosophie of Doni
- Fables of Aesop as first printed by William Caxton in 1484 with those of Avian, Alfonso and Poggio, David Nutt, 1889 (Vol. 1, Vol. 2)
- English Fairy Tales, 1890 †
- Celtic Fairy Tales, 1891 †
- Indian Fairy Tales, 1892 †
- More English Fairy Tales, 1893 †
- More Celtic Fairy Tales, 1894 †
- Fables of Aesop, 1894 , illustrated by Richard Heighway
- The Most Delectable History of Reynard the Fox, 1895 , illustrated by W. Frank Calderon
- The Book of Wonder Voyages, 1896 †
- Europa's Fairy Book, 1916 † – also known as European Folk and Fairy Tales

† Illustrated by John D. Batten
Other

- The Story of Geographical Discovery – How the World Became Known, 1916
