= Richard Heighway =

British illustrator

Richard Heighway (March 1832–10 October 1917) was a British illustrator, noted and exhibited for his black and white designs of Aesop's Fables. His work was influenced by the English illustrator Walter Crane.

Heighway's published work include: The Story of the Three Bears, McLoughlin Bros. 1880; The Fables of Æsop, Joseph Jacobs (ed.), MacMillan & Co. 1894; and Bluebeard and Puss in Boots, Banbury Cross Series, Dent 1895.
