= Corporation Act 1661 =

Act of the Parliament of England

- Act of Parliament
- Parliament of England
- Long title: An Act for the well Governing and Regulating of Corporations.
- Citation: 13 Cha. 2 St. 2. c. 1
- Territorial extent: England and Wales

Dates
- Royal assent: 20 December 1661
- Commencement: 20 November 1661 (Note: Start of session.)
- Repealed: 13 July 1871

Other legislation
- Amended by: Qualification for Employments Act 1726; Sacramental Test Act 1828; Statute Law Revision Act 1863
- Repealed by: Promissory Oaths Act 1871
- Relates to: Promissory Oaths Act 1868; Corporations Act 1718; Indemnity Act 1727

Status: Repealed

Text of statute as originally enacted

The Corporation Act 1661 (13 Cha. 2 St. 2. c. 1) was an act of the Parliament of England. It belonged to the general category of test acts, designed for the express purpose of restricting public offices in England to members of the Church of England.

Though commonly spoken of as one of the "Penal Laws", and enumerated by Butler in his Historical Account of the Laws against the Roman Catholics of England, it was not directly aimed against them, but against the Presbyterians. It was passed in December 1661, the year after the Restoration, by Charles II. The Cavalier Parliament aimed at restoring England to its state before the time of the Commonwealth. It required all the prudence of the Earl of Clarendon, the chancellor, to restrain them. The Corporation Act represents the limit to which he was prepared to go in endeavouring to restrict the power of the Presbyterians. They were influentially represented in the government of cities and boroughs throughout the country, and this act was designed to dispossess them.

The act provided that no person could be legally elected to any office relating to the government of a city or corporation, unless he had within the previous twelve months received the sacrament of "the Lord's Supper" according to the rites of the Church of England. He was also commanded to take the Oaths of Allegiance and Oath of Supremacy, to swear belief in the Doctrine of Passive Obedience, and to renounce the Covenant. In default of these requisites the election was to be void.

A somewhat similar act passed twelve years later, known as the Test Act, prescribed for all officers, civil and military, further stringent conditions, including a declaration against transubstantiation.

These two acts operated very prejudicially on Catholics, forming an important part of the general Penal Laws which kept them out of public life. In later times the number, even of non-Catholics, who qualified for civil and military posts in accordance with their provisions was very small, and an "Act of Indemnity" used to be passed annually, to relieve those who had not done so from the penalties incurred. There was no expression in this act limiting its operation to the case of Protestants; yet on the only occasion when a Catholic ventured to ask for a share in the Indemnity, it was refused on the ground of the act not being applicable to him. (Butler, op. cit., 19.)

== Subsequent developments ==
The act remained nominally in force throughout the eighteenth century. It was eventually replaced by Sacramental Test Act 1828 (9 Geo. 4. c. 17), the year before Catholic Emancipation.

Sections 1, 4–6, 11 and 12 of the act were repealed by section 1 of, and the schedule to, the Statute Law Revision Act 1863 (26 & 27 Vict. c. 125), which came into force on 28 July 1863.

The whole act was repealed by section 1 of, and part I of schedule one to, the Promissory Oaths Act 1871 (34 & 35 Vict. c. 48), which came into force on 13 July 1871.
