= Mansion House and Guildhall Meetings =

The Mansion House and Guildhall Meetings were a series of meetings convened by the Lord Mayor of London at Mansion House and Guildhall, organized by the residents of the English capital to protest against the persecution of Jews.

The initial meeting, held in 1840, denounced the blood libel accusation against Jews in Damascus and received favorable responses from foreign powers. Subsequent meetings in 1882 and 1890, supported by influential figures including religious leaders, scientists, and politicians, protested against anti-Jewish pogroms in the Russian Empire. These gatherings led to the establishment of the Mansion House Committee, later known as the Russo-Jewish Committee, which played a significant role in relocating and absorbing Jewish refugees, and raising and disbursing relief funds for pogrom victims.

== History ==
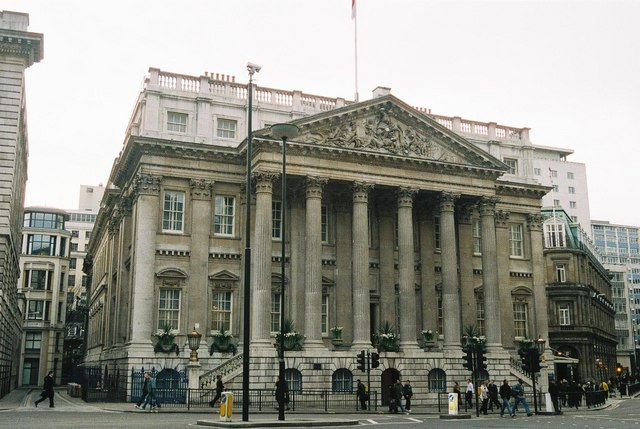
Mansion House in 2005

=== 1840 meeting ===
The first of these meetings took place on July 3, 1840, in protest of the blood libel accusation leveled against the Jewish community in Damascus. This meeting was initiated in response to a request from 210 prominent city residents. Speeches were delivered by Daniel O'Connell, Alderman Thompson, Dr. Bowring, and others, who expressed their disbelief in the accusation and called for the release of the accused individuals. Resolutions passed during the meeting were transmitted by the Lord Mayor to the chief ambassadors of foreign nations residing in England. A particularly favorable response was received from Nicholas I, Emperor of Russia.

=== 1882 meeting ===
Over four decades later, meetings were convened by the Lord Mayor of London to protest against the mistreatment of Jews in the Russian Empire. These injustices were brought to public attention through articles published by Joseph Jacobs in the London Times on January 9 and 11, 1882. Consequently, a requisition was made for a Mansion House Meeting, which garnered the support of thirty-eight signatories, including the Archbishop of Canterbury, Cardinal Manning, Charles Darwin, John Tyndall, and eighteen Members of Parliament. This meeting sparked a series of gatherings throughout the United Kingdom, including one held at the University of Oxford.

As a consequence of this meeting, a Mansion House Fund was established, raising £108,000. This fund was administered by a Mansion House Committee, which later absorbed the £100,000 collected after the Guildhall Meeting, when it was renamed the Russo-Jewish Committee. In the early stages of its work, the Mansion House Committee oversaw the relocation of large numbers of Russian Jewish refugees from Brody to America, with a branch committee based in Liverpool under the leadership of B. L. Benas. Sir Julian Goldsmid served as the chairman of both committees, with N. S. Joseph fulfilling the role of honorary secretary. The committee actively participated in conferences addressing the plight of Russian Jews and played a role in founding agricultural colonies in locations such as Moosomin, Saskatchewan, Painted Woods, North Dakota, Vineland, New Jersey, and elsewhere. In addition to assisting the Jewish Board of Guardians by facilitating immigration, repatriation, and settlement of refugees, the Russo-Jewish Committee also established a Location and Information Bureau in London as a labour registry, and initiated evening classes in English for refugees, enabling them to secure employment beyond congested urban areas.

=== 1890 meeting ===
The requisition for a third Guildhall Meeting of December 10, 1890, was signed by eighty-three individuals, once again led by the Archbishop of Canterbury and Cardinal Manning. Among the signatories were nineteen peers, twenty-seven Members of Parliament, and eminent representatives from various learned professions. A resolution, proposed by the Duke of Westminster and seconded by the Bishop of Ripon, was adopted. It affirmed,

That in the opinion of this meeting the renewed sufferings of the Jews in Russia from the operation of severe and exceptional edicts and disabilities are deeply to be deplored, and that in this last decade of the nineteenth century religious liberty is a principle which should be recognized by every Christian community as among the natural human rights.

In the name of the citizens of London, a memorandum was sent to the Russian czar, appealing for political and social equality for Jews in Russia. The czar declined to receive this communication, and it was consequently returned through the foreign office.
