= Indemnity Act 1727 =

Act of the Parliament of Great Britain

- Act of Parliament
- Parliament of Great Britain
- Long title: An Act for indemnifying Persons who have omitted to qualify themselves for Offices and Employments within the Time limited by Law, and for allowing further Time for that Purpose; and for repealing so much of Two Acts of Parliament therein mentioned, as requires Persons to qualify themselves to continue in Offices or Employments for the Space of Six Months after the Demise of His Majesty, His Heirs or Successors.
- Citation: 1 Geo. 2. St. 2. c. 23
- Territorial extent: Great Britain

Dates
- Royal assent: 28 May 1728
- Commencement: 23 January 1728 (Note: Start of session.)
- Repealed: 15 July 1867
Other legislation
Amends	Regency Act 1705; Succession to the Crown Act 1707
Repealed by	Statute Law Revision Act 1867
Relates to	Test Act 1673; Corporation Act 1661

Status: Repealed

Text of statute as originally enacted

The Indemnity Act 1727 (1 Geo. 2. St. 2. c. 23) was an act of the Parliament of Great Britain passed during the reign of George II.

It relieved Nonconformists from the requirements in the Test Act 1673 (25 Cha. 2. c. 2) and the Corporation Act 1661 (13 Cha. 2 St. 2. c. 1) that public office holders must have taken the sacrament of the Lord's Supper in an Anglican church.

== Subsequent developments ==
The whole act was repealed by section 1 of, and the schedule to, the Statute Law Revision Act 1867 (30 & 31 Vict. c. 59).
