= Sacramental Test Act 1828 =

Act of the Parliament of the United Kingdom

- Act of Parliament
- Parliament of the United Kingdom
- Long title: An Act for repealing so much of several Acts as imposes the Necessity of receiving the Sacrament of the Lord's Supper as a Qualification for certain Offices and Employments.
- Citation: 9 Geo. 4. c. 17
- Territorial extent: United Kingdom

Dates
- Royal assent: 9 May 1828
- Commencement: 9 May 1828 (Note: The Acts of Parliament (Commencement) Act 1793.)
- Repealed: 13 July 1871
Other legislation
| Amends | Corporation Act 1661; Popish Recusants Act 1672; Indemnity Act 1742 |
| Repealed by | Promissory Oaths Act 1871 |
| Relates to | Lords Justices Act 1837; Promissory Oaths Act 1868 |

Status: Repealed

Text of statute as originally enacted

The Sacramental Test Act 1828 (9 Geo. 4. c. 17) was an act of the Parliament of the United Kingdom. It repealed the requirement that government officials take communion in the Church of England. Sir Robert Peel took the lead for the Tory government in the repeal and collaborated with Anglican Church leaders.

== Background ==
The Corporation Act 1661 (13 Cha. 2 St. 2. c. 1) laid down that all mayors and officials in municipal corporations had to receive the sacrament of Holy Communion in accordance with the rites of the Church of England. They also had to take the oath of allegiance, the oath of supremacy and non-resistance and declare the Solemn League and Covenant to be false. Under the Test Act 1673 (25 Cha. 2. c. 2), all holders of civil and military offices and places of trust under the Crown had to take the oaths of allegiance and supremacy and receive the Anglican sacrament. However, in practice the full force of the law was not exacted against Protestant Dissenters: an annual Indemnity Act was frequently passed that ensured that Dissenters were allowed to hold public office.

On 17 February 1827, the Prime Minister Lord Liverpool suffered a stroke. George Canning succeeded him in April. The formation of Canning's ministry revolved around Catholic emancipation, with the anti-Catholics Lord Eldon, the Duke of Wellington, Sir Robert Peel, Lord Bathurst and Lord Westmoreland refusing to serve. Canning persuaded the Whigs Henry Brougham and George Tierney into forming a coalition on the condition that the Whig ministers did not attempt to repeal the Test and Corporation Acts or promote parliamentary reform. (Canning himself would not support Repeal until Catholic emancipation had been achieved.) Brougham wrote to Thomas Creevey on 21 April on the reason for joining Canning: "My principle is – anything to lock the door for ever on Eldon and Co." On 7 June, Lord John Russell withdrew his motion for Repeal of the Test and Corporation Acts but pledged to introduce it again in the next session of Parliament. On 8 August Canning died and the coalition fell apart, with the Duke of Wellington forming a ministry.

== Passage ==
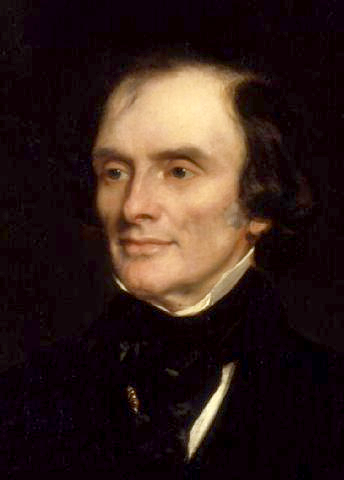
Lord John Russell.

On 26 February 1828, Russell introduced the Sacramental Test Bill, which would Repeal the Test and Corporation Acts. Russell argued that religious liberty was a more effective safeguard for the Church of England than exclusion and that the bill would stop the reprehensible practice of the most sacred rite of Christianity being used for a purely secular end. Peel supported the bill on the government's behalf on the condition that the following declaration would be included:

I, A. B., do solemnly declare that I will never exercise any power, authority, or influence, which I may possess by virtue of the office of — to injure or weaken the Protestant Church as it is by law established within this realm, or to disturb it in the possession of any rights or privileges to which it is by law entitled.

The declaration was approved in the committee stage and was sent up to the House of Lords, after passing the House of Commons by 237 to 193. In March 1828, Peel met the Archbishops of Canterbury and York, and the Bishops of London, Durham, Chester and Llandaff. He managed to persuade them to let the bill pass through the Lords; in the vote no Bishop opposed the bill. Russell wrote on 31 March: "Peel is a very pretty hand at hauling down his colours. It is a really gratifying thing to force the enemy to give up his first line, that none but churchmen are worthy to serve the state, and I trust we shall soon make him give up the second, that none but Protestants are". The former Lord Chancellor in the previous Tory administrations, Lord Eldon, wrote to his daughter in April:

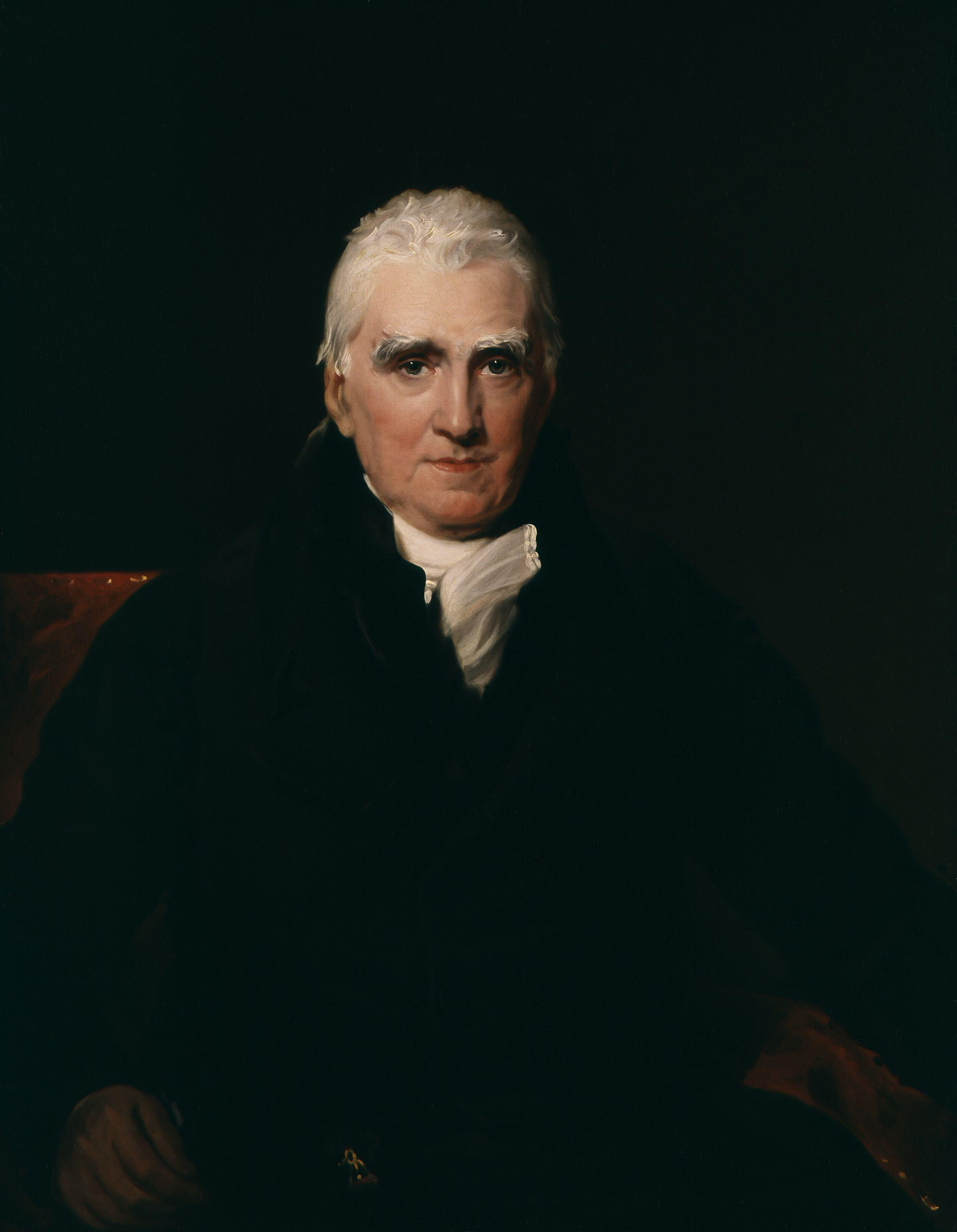
Lord Eldon.

...the administration have – to their shame, be it said – got the Archbishops and most of the Bishops to support this revolutionary Bill. I voted as long ago as in the years, I think, 1787, 1789, and 1790, against a similar measure; Lord North and Pitt opposing it as destructive of the Church Establishment – Dr Priestley, a Dissenting minister, then asserting, that he had laid a train of gunpowder under the Church, which would blow it up; and Dr Price, another Dissenting minister, blessing God that he could depart in peace, as the revolution in France would lead here to the destruction of all union between Church and State. The young men and lads in the House of Commons are too young to remember these things. From 1790 to 1827, many and various have been the attempts to relieve the Catholics, but through those thirty-seven years nobody has thought, and evinced that thought, of proposing such a Bill as this in Parliament, as necessary, or fit, as between the Church and the Dissenters. Canning, last year, positively declared that he would oppose it altogether.

The Whig peer Lord Holland wrote to Henry Fox on 10 April:

It is the greatest victory over the principle of persecution & exclusion yet obtained. Practically there have been greater such as the Toleration Act in W 3d's time & the Catholick bill of 1792. Practically too the Catholick Emancipation when it comes will be a far more important measure, more immediate & more extensive in its effects – but in principle this is the greatest of them all as it explodes the real Tory doctrine that Church & State are indivisible.

The supporters of the Test and Corporation Acts moved wrecking amendments to modify the bill but these were defeated by large majorities. Lord Eldon unsuccessfully moved to include the words "I am a Protestant" into the declaration. The Bishop of Llandaff, however, managed to get included into the declaration the words "upon the true faith of a Christian" in the face of Lord Holland's opposition. A religious test thus remained on the statute book until repealed in 1866. The bill received its third reading on 2 May and on 9 May received royal assent.

== Subsequent developments ==
The act led to "an explosion of pamphlets on the question of Catholic emancipation throughout the remainder of that year and on into the next". Immediately after the act passed Parliament Sir Francis Burdett in the Commons and Lord Lansdowne in the Lords raised the issue of Catholic emancipation. The Catholic Relief Act 1829 repealed the Test Act 1678 that had required all MPs to take the oath of abjuration, declare against transubstantiation and against the invocation of the Virgin Mary and the sacrifice of the mass.

The "upon the true faith of a Christian" phrase in the new oath maintained a hurdle for Jewish candidates for political office, delaying the emancipation of the Jews in the United Kingdom until 1858. Atheists remained barred until 1886.

The act and others relating to oaths were superseded by the Promissory Oaths Act 1868 (31 & 32 Vict. c. 72). The whole act was repealed by section 1 of, and part I of schedule one to, the Promissory Oaths Act 1871 (34 & 35 Vict. c. 48), which came into force on 13 July 1871.

== Bibliography ==
- J. C. D. Clark, English Society, 1688–1832. Ideology, social structure and political practice during the ancien regime (Cambridge University Press, 1985).
- Norman Gash, Mr Secretary Peel (1961) pp: 460–65
- Richard A. Gaunt, "Peel's Other Repeal: The Test and Corporation Acts, 1828," Parliamentary History (2014) 33#1 pp 243–262
- Boyd Hilton, A Mad, Bad, and Dangerous People? England. 1783–1846 (Oxford: Clarendon Press, 2006).
- Robert Hole, Pulpits, politics and public order in England. 1760–1832 (Cambridge University Press, 1989).
- R. A. Melikan, John Scott, Lord Eldon, 1751–1838. The Duty of Loyalty (Cambridge University Press, 1999).
