= Land Drainage Act =

Stock short title used for legislation

Land Drainage Act (with its variations) is a stock short title used in New Zealand and the United Kingdom for legislation relating to land drainage. Such legislation forms part of land drainage law.

== List ==
=== Canada ===
Manitoba

- The Land Drainage Act 1895 (58 & 59 Vict c 11)
- The Land Drainage Act 1898 (61 Vict c 16)
- The Land Drainage Act (RSM 1913 c 56)

Ontario

The Municipal Drainage Act (RSO 1897 c 226)

=== New Zealand ===
- The Drainage Act 1881 (45 Vict No 27)
- The Drainage of Mines Act 1884 (48 Vict No 35)
- The Land Drainage Act 1893
- The Land Drainage Amendment Act 1894
- The Land Drainage Amendment Act 1898 (62 Vict No 30)
- The Land Drainage Act 1904 (4 Edw 7 No 13)
- The Land Drainage Amendment Act 1908 (8 Edw 7 No 249)
- The Land Drainage Amendment Act 1913 (4 Geo 5 No 31)
- The Land Drainage Amendment Act 1920 (11 Geo 5 No 56)
- The Land Drainage Amendment Act 1922 (13 Geo 5 No 5)
- The Land Drainage Amendment Act 1923 (13 Geo 5 No 42)
- The Land Drainage Amendment Act 1952 (No 47)
- The Land Drainage Amendment Act 1956 (No 7)
- The Land Drainage Amendment Act 1958 (No 73)
- The Land Drainage Amendment Act 1964 (No 95)
- The Land Drainage Amendment Act 1965 (No 90)
- The Land Drainage Amendment Act 1967 (No 87)
- The Land Drainage Amendment Act 1968 (No 88)
- The Land Drainage Amendment Act 1971 (No 106)
- The Land Drainage Amendment Act 1972 (No 74)
- The Land Drainage Amendment Act 1974 (No 93)
- The Land Drainage Amendment Act 1975 (No 83)
- The Land Drainage Amendment Act 1976 (No 97)
- The Land Drainage Amendment Act 1978 (No 102)
- The Land Drainage Amendment Act 1980 (No 118)
- The Land Drainage Amendment Act 1988 (No 69)

=== United Kingdom ===
(The Land Drainage Supplemental Acts are listed separately).

- The Land Drainage Act 1845 (8 & 9 Vict. c. 56)
- The Land Drainage Act 1847 (10 & 11 Vict. c. 38)
- The Land Drainage Act 1861 (24 & 25 Vict. c. 133)
- The Land Drainage Act 1914 (5 & 6 Geo. 5. c. 4)
- The Land Drainage Act 1918 (8 & 9 Geo. 5. c. 17)
- The Land Drainage Act 1926 (16 & 17 Geo. 5. c. 24)
- The Land Drainage Act 1929 (20 & 21 Geo. 5. c. 8)
- The Land Drainage Act 1930 (20 & 21 Geo. 5. c. 44)
- The Land Drainage Act 1961 (9 & 10 Eliz. 2. c. 48)
- The Land Drainage (Amendment) Act 1976 (c. 17)
- The Land Drainage Act 1976 (c. 70)
- The Land Drainage Act 1991 (c. 59)
- The Land Drainage Act 1994 (c. 25)
- The Flood Prevention and Land Drainage (Scotland) Act 1997 (c. 36)
- The Land Drainage (Scotland) Act 1847
- The Land Drainage (Scotland) Act 1930 (20 & 21 Geo. 5. c. 20)
- The Land Drainage (Scotland) Act 1941 (4 & 5 Geo. 6. c. 13)
- The Land Drainage (Scotland) Act 1958 (6 & 7 Eliz. 2. c. 24)
- The Land Drainage Act (Ireland) 1863 (26 & 27 Vict. c. 26)
- The Inclosure and Drainage (Rates) Act 1833
- The Drainage Rates Act 1958 (6 & 7 Eliz. 2. c. 37)
- The Drainage Rates Act 1962 (10 & 11 Eliz. 2. c. 39)
- The Drainage Rates Act 1963 (c. 10)
- The Lough Neagh and Lower Bann Drainage and Navigation Act (Northern Ireland) 1955 (c. 15) (NI)
- The Lough Neagh Drainage (Amendment) Act (Northern Ireland) 1970 (c. 7) (NI)

The Drainage and Improvement of Lands (Ireland) Acts 1863 to 1892 was the collective title of the following Acts:

- The Drainage and Improvement of Lands Act (Ireland) 1863 (26 & 27 Vict. c. 88)
- The Drainage and Improvement of Lands Act (Ireland) 1864 (27 & 28 Vict. c. 72)
- The Drainage and Improvement of Lands Amendment Act (Ireland) 1865 (28 & 29 Vict. c. 52)
- The Drainage and Improvement of Lands Amendment Act (Ireland) 1869 (32 & 33 Vict. c. 72)
- The Drainage and Improvement of Lands Amendment Act (Ireland) 1872 (35 & 36 Vict. c. 31)
- The Drainage and Improvement of Lands Amendment Act (Ireland) 1874 (37 & 38 Vict. c. 32)
- The Drainage and Improvement of Lands (Ireland) Act 1878 (41 & 42 Vict. c. 59)
- The Drainage and Improvement of Lands (Ireland) Act 1880 (43 & 44 Vict. c. 27)
- The Drainage and Improvement of Land (Ireland) Act 1892 (55 & 56 Vict. c. 63)

The Drainage and Navigation (Ireland) Acts 1842 to 1857 was the collective title of the following Acts:

- The Drainage (Ireland) Act 1842 (5 & 6 Vict. c. 89)
- The Drainage (Ireland) Act 1845 (8 & 9 Vict. c. 69)
- The Drainage (Ireland) Act 1846 (9 & 10 Vict. c. 4)
- The Drainage (Ireland) Act 1847 (10 & 11 Vict. c. 79)
- The Drainage and Improvement of Lands (Ireland) Act 1853 (16 & 17 Vict. c. 130)
- The Drainage and Improvement of Lands (Ireland) Act 1855 (18 & 19 Vict. c. 110)
- The Drainage (Ireland) Act 1856 (19 & 20 Vict. c. 62)
- The Public Works (Ireland) Act 1857 (20 & 21 Vict. c. 23)

The Public Money Drainage Acts 1846 to 1856 was the collective title of the following Acts:

- The Public Money Drainage Act 1846 (9 & 10 Vict. c. 101)
- The Public Money Drainage Act 1847 (10 & 11 Vict. c. 11)
- The Public Money Drainage Act 1848 (11 & 12 Vict. c. 119)
- The Public Money Drainage Act 1850 (13 & 14 Vict. c. 31)
- The Public Money Drainage Act 1856 (19 & 20 Vict. c. 9)

=== Western Australia ===
- The Land Drainage Act 1925

== Land Drainage Supplemental Acts ==
The Land Drainage Supplemental Acts were a series of acts of the Parliament of the United Kingdom passed to confirm provisional orders made under the Land Drainage Act 1861.

The following are Land Drainage Supplemental Acts:

- The Land Drainage Supplemental Act 1863 (26 & 27 Vict. c. 63)
- The Land Drainage Supplemental Act 1864 (27 & 28 Vict. c. 14)
- The Land Drainage Supplemental Act 1865 (28 & 29 Vict. c. 23)
- The Land Drainage Supplemental Act 1866 (29 & 30 Vict. c. 33)
- The Land Drainage Supplemental Act 1866 Number 2 (29 & 30 Vict. c. 80)
- The Land Drainage Supplemental Act 1867 (30 & 31 Vict. c. 22)
- The Land Drainage Supplemental Act 1868 (31 & 32 Vict. c. lxxxiii)
- The Land Drainage Supplemental Act 1868 No. 2 (31 & 32 Vict. c. clvi)
- The Land Drainage Supplemental Act 1871 (34 & 35 Vict. c. lx)
- The Land Drainage Supplemental Act 1873 (36 & 37 Vict. c. xxiv)
- The Land Drainage Supplemental Act 1875 (38 & 39 Vict. c. i)
- The Land Drainage Supplemental Act 1879 (42 & 43 Vict. c. xli)
- The Land Drainage Supplemental Act 1880 (43 & 44 Vict. c. lxxxii)
- The Land Drainage Supplemental Act 1881 (44 & 45 Vict. c. ci)
- The Land Drainage Supplemental Act 1882 (45 & 46 Vict. c. lxvii)
- The Land Drainage Supplemental Act 1883 (46 & 47 Vict. c. ii)
- The Land Drainage Supplemental (No. 2) Act 1883 (46 & 47 Vict. c. lxxxv)
- The Land Drainage Supplemental Act 1884 (47 & 48 Vict. c. xli)
- The Land Drainage Supplemental Act 1889 (52 & 53 Vict. c. xlvii)
- The Land Drainage Supplemental Act 1891 (54 & 55 Vict. c. xxiii)
- The Land Drainage Supplemental Act 1892 (55 & 56 Vict. c. ccvii)
- The Land Drainage Supplemental Act 1896 (59 & 60 Vict. c. xciii)
- The Land Drainage Supplemental Act 1898 (62 & 63 Vict. c. lxxv)

=== Land Drainage Supplemental Act 1863 ===
Land Drainage Supplemental Act 1863 (Note: Section 3.)
- Act of Parliament
- Parliament of the United Kingdom
- Long title: An Act to confirm certain Provisional Orders under The Land Drainage Act, 1861.
- Citation: 26 & 27 Vict. c. 63
- Territorial extent: United Kingdom

Dates
- Royal assent: 21 July 1863
- Commencement: 21 July 1863 (Note: Section 1.)

Other legislation
- Amended by: Statute Law (Repeals) Act 1993

Status: Partially repealed

Text of statute as originally enacted

The Land Drainage Supplemental Act 1863 (26 & 27 Vict. c. 63) is a public general act.

The bill for this act was the Land Drainage (Provisional Orders) Bill.

Part I of the schedule is the provisional order "In the Matter of Morden Carrs, County of Durham". Part II is the provisional order "In the Matter of Longdon and Eldersfield Drainage". Part III is the provisional order "In the Matter of Maxey Drainage".

Section 1 from "provided always" (where first occurring) onwards, and Parts I and III of the Schedule, were repealed by section 1(1) of, and Group 3 of Part XIII of Schedule 1 to, the Statute Law (Repeals) Act 1993.

As to the Longdon and Eldersfield drainage commissioners and internal drainage district constituted by this act, see paragraphs 2 and 3 of schedule 2 to the Lower Severn Internal Drainage Board Order 2005 (SI 2005/430).

=== Land Drainage Supplemental Act 1864 ===
Land Drainage Supplemental Act 1864
- Act of Parliament
- Parliament of the United Kingdom
- Long title: An Act to confirm certain Provisional Orders under "The Land Drainage Act, 1861."
- Citation: 27 & 28 Vict. c. 14
- Territorial extent: United Kingdom

Dates
- Royal assent: 13 May 1864
- Commencement: 13 May 1864

Other legislation
- Amended by: Statute Law (Repeals) Act 1993

Status: Partially repealed

Text of statute as originally enacted

The Land Drainage Supplemental Act 1864 (27 & 28 Vict. c. 14) is a public general act.

Section 2, and part I of the schedule, were repealed by section 1(1) of, and Group 3 of Part XIII of Schedule 1 to, the Statute Law (Repeals) Act 1993.

As to the Curry Moor and Stanmoor internal drainage boards and districts constituted by this Act, see paragraphs 2 and 3 of Schedule 2 to the Parrett Internal Drainage Board Order 2005 (SI 2005/431).

=== Land Drainage Supplemental Act 1865 ===
Land Drainage Supplemental Act 1865 (Note: Section 2.)
- Act of Parliament
- Parliament of the United Kingdom
- Long title: An Act to confirm a Provisional Order under "The Land Drainage Act, 1861."
- Citation: 28 & 29 Vict. c. 23
- Territorial extent: United Kingdom

Dates
- Royal assent: 9 May 1865
- Commencement: 9 May 1865

Status: Current legislation

Text of statute as originally enacted

The Land Drainage Supplemental Act 1865 (28 & 29 Vict. c. 23) is a public general act.

=== Land Drainage Supplemental Act 1866 ===
Land Drainage Supplemental Act 1866
- Act of Parliament
- Parliament of the United Kingdom
- Long title: An Act to confirm a Provisional Order under "The Land Drainage Act, 1861."
- Citation: 29 & 30 Vict. c. 33
- Territorial extent: United Kingdom

Dates
- Royal assent: 11 June 1866
- Commencement: 11 June 1866
- Repealed: 5 November 1993

Other legislation
- Repealed by: Statute Law (Repeals) Act 1993

Status: Repealed

Text of statute as originally enacted

The Land Drainage Supplemental Act 1866 (29 & 30 Vict. c. 33) was a public general act.

The whole act was repealed by section 1(1) of, and group 3 of part XIII of schedule 1 to, the Statute Law (Repeals) Act 1993.

=== Land Drainage Supplemental Act 1866 Number 2 ===
Land Drainage Supplemental Act 1866 Number 2
- Act of Parliament
- Parliament of the United Kingdom
- Long title: An Act to confirm a Provisional Order under "The Land Drainage Act, 1861."
- Citation: 29 & 30 Vict. c. 80
- Territorial extent: United Kingdom

Dates
- Royal assent: 6 August 1866
- Commencement: 6 August 1866
- Repealed: 5 November 1993

Other legislation
- Repealed by: Statute Law (Repeals) Act 1993

Status: Repealed

Text of statute as originally enacted

The Land Drainage Supplemental Act 1866 Number 2 (29 & 30 Vict. c. 80) was a public general act.

The whole act was repealed by section 1(1) of, and group 3 of part XIII of schedule 1 to, the Statute Law (Repeals) Act 1993.

=== Land Drainage Supplemental Act 1867 ===
Land Drainage Supplemental Act 1867
- Act of Parliament
- Parliament of the United Kingdom
- Long title: An Act to confirm a Provisional Order under "The Land Drainage Act, 1861."
- Citation: 30 & 31 Vict. c. 22
- Territorial extent: United Kingdom

Dates
- Royal assent: 31 May 1867
- Commencement: 31 May 1867

Status: Current legislation

Text of statute as originally enacted

The Land Drainage Supplemental Act 1867 (30 & 31 Vict. c. 22) is a public general act. The bill for this act was the Land Drainage Supplemental Bill.

== See also ==
- List of short titles
