= Commissioners for Oaths (Ireland) Act 1872 =

Act of the Parliament of the United Kingdom

Commissioners for Oaths (Ireland) Act 1872 (Note: The citation of this act by this short title was authorised by section 1 of, and the first schedule to, the Short Titles Act 1896. Due to the repeal of those provisions it is now authorised by section 19(2) of the Interpretation Act 1978.)
- Act of Parliament
- Parliament of the United Kingdom
- Long title: An Act to provide for the appointment of Commissioners in the Channel Islands, and also in the City of Dublin and its vicinity, to take Affidavits to be used in the Superior Courts of Common Law and other Courts in Ireland.
- Citation: 35 & 36 Vict. c. 75
- Territorial extent: United Kingdom

Dates
- Royal assent: 10 August 1872
- Commencement: 10 August 1872 (Note: Section 1.)
- Repealed: 18 April 1979 (Note: The Judicature (Northern Ireland) Act 1978 (Commencement No. 4) Order 1979 (SI 1979/422).)
Other legislation
Repealed by	Judicature (Northern Ireland) Act 1978

Status: Repealed

Text of statute as originally enacted

The Commissioners for Oaths (Ireland) Act 1872 (35 & 36 Vict. c. 75) was an act of the Parliament of the United Kingdom of Great Britain and Ireland.

The short title for this act was assigned by section 1 of, and the first schedule to the Short Titles Act 1896 (59 & 60 Vict. c. 14).

== Subsequent developments ==
The whole act was repealed for the United Kingdom by section 122(2) of, and part I of schedule 7 to, the Judicature (Northern Ireland) Act 1978, which came into force on 18 April 1979.

The act was retained for the Republic of Ireland by section 2(2)(a) of, and part 4 of schedule 1 to, the Statute Law Revision Act 2007, which came into force on 8 May 2007.
