= Drainage and Improvement of Lands Amendment (Ireland) Act 1872 =

Act of the Parliament of the United Kingdom

Drainage and Improvement of Lands Amendment Act (Ireland) 1872 (Note: Section 1.)
- Act of Parliament
- Parliament of the United Kingdom
- Long title: An Act to amend the several Acts relating to the Drainage and Improvement of Lands in Ireland.
- Citation: 35 & 36 Vict. c. 31
- Territorial extent: Ireland (Note: Long title.)

Dates
- Royal assent: 18 July 1872
- Commencement: 18 July 1872 (Note: The Acts of Parliament (Commencement) Act 1793.)
- Repealed: Northern Ireland: 2 March 1954
Other legislation
Amends	Drainage (Ireland) Act 1842; Landed Property Improvement (Ireland) Act 1847; Drainage and Improvement of Lands Act (Ireland) 1863
Repealed by	Erne Drainage and Development Act (Northern Ireland) 1950; Republic of Ireland: Land and Conveyancing Law Reform Act 2009

Status: Repealed

Text of statute as originally enacted

The Drainage and Improvement of Lands Amendment Act (Ireland) 1872 (35 & 36 Vict. c. 31) was an act of the Parliament of the United Kingdom of Great Britain and Ireland.

The whole act was repealed for Northern Ireland by the Erne Drainage and Development Act (Northern Ireland) 1950 (c. 15 (N.I.)).

The act was retained for the Republic of Ireland by section 2 of, and the first schedule to the Statute Law Revision Act 2007 (Number 28 of 2007) but was later repealed by sections 2 and 8 of, and the second schedule to the Land and Conveyancing Law Reform Act 2009 (Number 27 of 2009).
