= List of acts of the Parliament of the United Kingdom from 1872 =

This is a complete list of acts of the Parliament of the United Kingdom for the year 1872.

Note that the first parliament of the United Kingdom was held in 1801; parliaments between 1707 and 1800 were either parliaments of Great Britain or of Ireland). For acts passed up until 1707, see the list of acts of the Parliament of England and the list of acts of the Parliament of Scotland. For acts passed from 1707 to 1800, see the list of acts of the Parliament of Great Britain. See also the list of acts of the Parliament of Ireland.

For acts of the devolved parliaments and assemblies in the United Kingdom, see the list of acts of the Scottish Parliament, the list of acts of the Northern Ireland Assembly, and the list of acts and measures of Senedd Cymru; see also the list of acts of the Parliament of Northern Ireland.

The number shown after each act's title is its chapter number. Acts passed before 1963 are cited using this number, preceded by the year(s) of the reign during which the relevant parliamentary session was held; thus the Union with Ireland Act 1800 is cited as "39 & 40 Geo. 3 c. 67", meaning the 67th act passed during the session that started in the 39th year of the reign of George III and which finished in the 40th year of that reign. Note that the modern convention is to use Arabic numerals in citations (thus "41 Geo. 3" rather than "41 Geo. III"). Acts of the last session of the Parliament of Great Britain and the first session of the Parliament of the United Kingdom are both cited as "41 Geo. 3".

Some of these acts have a short title. Some of these acts have never had a short title. Some of these acts have a short title given to them by later acts, such as by the Short Titles Act 1896.

== 35 & 36 Vict. ==
The fourth session of the 20th Parliament of the United Kingdom, which met from 6 February 1872 until 10 August 1872.

=== Public general acts ===
Short title	Citation	Royal assent
Long title
Supply Act 1872 (repealed)	35 & 36 Vict. c. 1	25 March 1872
An Act to apply certain sums out of the Consolidated Fund to the service of the years ending the thirty-first day of March one thousand eight hundred and seventy-one, one thousand eight hundred and seventy-two, and one thousand eight hundred and seventy-three. (Repealed by Statute Law Revision Act 1883 (46 & 47 Vict. c. 39))
Poor Law Loans Act 1872 (repealed)	35 & 36 Vict. c. 2	25 March 1872
An Act to extend and explain the Law relating to Loans for Purposes connected with the Relief of the Poor. (Repealed by Poor Law Act 1927 (17 & 18 Geo. 5. c. 14))
Mutiny Act 1872 (repealed)	35 & 36 Vict. c. 3	23 April 1872
An Act for Punishing Mutiny and Desertion, and for the better payment of the Army and their Quarters. (Repealed by Statute Law Revision Act 1883 (46 & 47 Vict. c. 39))
Marine Mutiny Act 1872 (repealed)	35 & 36 Vict. c. 4	23 April 1872
An Act for the Regulation of Her Majesty's Royal Marine Forces while on shore. (Repealed by Statute Law Revision Act 1883 (46 & 47 Vict. c. 39))
Bank of Ireland Charter Amendment Act 1872 or the Bank of Ireland Charter Act 1872	35 & 36 Vict. c. 5	23 April 1872
An Act to amend the Charter under which the Bank of Ireland is incorporated.
Public Parks (Ireland) Act 1869 Amendment Act 1872	35 & 36 Vict. c. 6	13 May 1872
An Act to amend The Public Parks (Ireland) Act, 1869. (Note: Public Parks (Ireland) Act 1869 (32 & 33 Vict. c. 28))
County Buildings (Loans) Act 1872 (repealed)	35 & 36 Vict. c. 7	13 May 1872
An Act to amend the Law respecting the borrowing of Money by County Authorities for County Buildings. (Repealed by Statute Law Revision (No. 2) Act 1893 (56 & 57 Vict. c. 54))
Deans and Canons Resignation Act 1872 (repealed)	35 & 36 Vict. c. 8	13 May 1872
An Act to provide for the Resignation of Deans and Canons. (Repealed by Clergy Pensions Measure 1926 (16 & 17 Geo. 5. No. 6) and Clergy Pensions Measure 1961 (9 & 10 Eliz. 2. No. 3))
West Indies Incumbered Estates Act 1872 (repealed)	35 & 36 Vict. c. 9	13 May 1872
An Act to continue the Appointment and Jurisdiction of the Commissioners for the Sale of Incumbered Estates in the West Indies. (Repealed by West Indian Incumbered Estates Act 1886 (49 & 50 Vict. c. 36))
Marriage (Society of Friends) Act 1872	35 & 36 Vict. c. 10	13 May 1872
An Act to extend the provisions of the Acts relating to Marriages in England and Ireland, so far as they relate to Marriages according to the usages of the Society of Friends. (Repealed for England and Wales by Marriage Act 1949 (12, 13 & 14 Geo. 6. c. 76))
Supply (No. 2) Act 1872 (repealed)	35 & 36 Vict. c. 11	13 May 1872
An Act to apply the sum of Six million pounds out of the Consolidated Fund to the service of the year ending the thirty-first day of March one thousand eight hundred and seventy-three. (Repealed by Statute Law Revision Act 1883 (46 & 47 Vict. c. 39))
Superannuation Act 1872 (repealed)	35 & 36 Vict. c. 12	13 May 1872
An Act to amend an Act of the fourth and fifth years of King William the Fourth, chapter twenty-four, intituled "An Act to alter, amend, and consolidate the laws for regulating the pensions, compensations, and allowances to be made to persons in respect of their haying held civil offices in His Majesty's service." (Note: Superannuation Act 1834 (4 & 5 Will. 4. c. 24)) (Repealed by Superannuation Act 1887 (50 & 51 Vict. c. 67))
Irish Church Amendment Act 1872 (repealed)	35 & 36 Vict. c. 13	27 June 1872
An Act to amend The Irish Church Act, 1869, (Note: Irish Church Act 1869 (32 & 33 Vict. c. 42)) so far as respects a Vacancy in the office of Commissioner of Church Temporalities in Ireland. (Repealed by Statute Law Revision (No. 2) Act 1893 (56 & 57 Vict. c. 54))
Diocesan Boundaries Act 1872 (repealed)	35 & 36 Vict. c. 14	27 June 1872
An Act for the Alteration of Boundaries of Dioceses. (Repealed by Pastoral Measure 1968 (No. 1) and Statute Law (Repeals) Act 1974 (c. 22))
Parks Regulation Act 1872	35 & 36 Vict. c. 15	27 June 1872
An Act for the Regulation of the Royal Parks and Gardens.
Cattle Disease (Ireland) Amendment Act 1872 (repealed)	35 & 36 Vict. c. 16	27 June 1872
An Act to amend the Cattle Disease (Ireland) Act Amendment Act, 1870. (Note: Cattle Disease (Ireland) Amendment Act 1870 (33 & 34 Vict. c. 36)) (Repealed by Contagious Diseases (Animals) Act 1878 (41 & 42 Vict. c. 74))
Loan Societies (Ireland) Act 1843 Amendment Act 1872 (repealed)	35 & 36 Vict. c. 17	27 June 1872
An Act to amend the Laws for the Regulation of Charitable Loan Societies in Ireland. (Repealed by Finance (Miscellaneous Provisions) Act (Northern Ireland) 1955 (c. 19 (N.I.)))
Inquiries by Board of Trade Act 1872 (repealed)	35 & 36 Vict. c. 18	27 June 1872
An Act for regulating Inquiries by the Board of Trade. (Repealed by Board of Trade Arbitrations, &c. Act 1874 (37 & 38 Vict. c. 40))
Pacific Islanders Protection Act 1872 or the Kidnapping Act 1872 (repealed)	35 & 36 Vict. c. 19	27 June 1872
An Act for the Prevention and Punishment of Criminal Outrages upon Natives of the Islands in the Pacific Ocean. (Repealed by Statute Law Revision Act 1964 (c. 79))
Customs and Inland Revenue Act 1872 (repealed)	35 & 36 Vict. c. 20	27 June 1872
An Act to grant certain Duties of Customs and Inland Revenue, and to alter other Duties. (Repealed by Customs and Inland Revenue Act 1882 (45 & 46 Vict. c. 41), Statute Law Revision Act 1883 (46 & 47 Vict. c. 39), Finance Act 1944 (7 & 8 Geo. 6. c. 23) and Statute Law Revision Act 1950 (14 Geo. 6. c. 6))
Reformatory and Industrial Schools Acts Amendment Act 1872 (repealed)	35 & 36 Vict. c. 21	27 June 1872
An Act to amend the Law relating to Reformatory and Industrial Schools. (Repealed by Children Act 1908 (8 Edw. 7. c. 67))
Party Processions Act (Ireland) Repeal Act 1872 (repealed)	35 & 36 Vict. c. 22	27 June 1872
An Act to repeal an Act, intituled "An Act to restrain Party Processions in Ireland." (Note: Party Processions (Ireland) Act 1850 (13 & 14 Vict. c. 2)) (Repealed by Statute Law Revision Act 1883 (46 & 47 Vict. c. 39))
Isle of Man Harbours Act 1872 (repealed)	35 & 36 Vict. c. 23	27 June 1872
An Act for amending the Law relating to the Harbours and Coasts of the Isle of Man. (Repealed by Harbours (Isle of Man) Act 1961)
Charitable Trustees Incorporation Act 1872 (repealed)	35 & 36 Vict. c. 24	27 June 1872
An Act to facilitate the Incorporation of Trustees of Charities for Religious, Educational, Literary, Scientific, and Public Charitable Purposes, and the Enrolment of certain Charitable Trust Deeds. (Repealed by Charities Act 1993 (c. 10))
Juries (Ireland) Act 1872 (repealed)	35 & 36 Vict. c. 25	27 June 1872
An Act to amend the Juries Act (Ireland), 1871. (Note: Juries Act (Ireland) 1871 (34 & 35 Vict. c. 65)) (Repealed by Statute Law Revision Act 1883 (46 & 47 Vict. c. 39), Statute Law Revision (No. 2) Act 1893 (56 & 57 Vict. c. 54), Jury Laws Amendment Act (Northern Ireland) 1926 (16 & 17 Geo. 5. c. 15 (N.I.)), Juries Act (Northern Ireland) 1953 (c. 19 (N.I.)) and Juries (Northern Ireland) Order 1974 (SI 1974/2143 (N.I. 6)))
Review of Justices Decisions Act 1872	35 & 36 Vict. c. 26	18 July 1872
An Act to amend the practice of the Courts of Law with respect to the Review of the Decisions of Justices.
Elementary Education Act Amendment Act 1872 (repealed)	35 & 36 Vict. c. 27	18 July 1872
An Act to amend the Elementary Education Act, 1870. (Note: Elementary Education Act 1870 (33 & 34 Vict. c. 75)) (Repealed by Education Act 1918 (8 & 9 Geo. 5. c. 39))
Queen's Bench (Ireland) Procedure Act 1872 (repealed)	35 & 36 Vict. c. 28	18 July 1872
An Act to amend the Practice and Procedure of the Crown Side of the Court of Queen's Bench in Ireland. (Repealed by Statute Law Revision (No. 2) Act 1893 (56 & 57 Vict. c. 54))
Colonial Governors (Pensions) Act 1872 (repealed)	35 & 36 Vict. c. 29	18 July 1872
An Act to amend the Act of the Session of the Twenty-eighth and Twenty-ninth years of the reign of Her present Majesty, chapter one hundred and thirteen, intituled "An Act to authorize the Payment of Retiring Pensions to Colonial Governors." (Note: Colonial Governors (Pensions) Act 1865 (28 & 29 Vict. c. 113)) (Repealed by Pensions (Governors of Dominions &c.) Act 1911 (1 & 2 Geo. 5. c. 24))
Chain Cable and Anchor Act 1872 (repealed)	35 & 36 Vict. c. 30	18 July 1872
An Act to suspend the compulsory Operation of the Chain Cables and Anchors Act, 1871. (Note: Chain Cable and Anchor Act 1871 (34 & 35 Vict. c. 101)) (Repealed by Statute Law Revision (No. 2) Act 1893 (56 & 57 Vict. c. 54))
Drainage and Improvement of Lands Amendment Act (Ireland) 1872 or the Drainage and Improvement of Lands Amendment (Ireland) Act 1872 (repealed)	35 & 36 Vict. c. 31	18 July 1872
An Act to amend the several Acts relating to the Drainage and Improvement of Lands in Ireland. (Repealed by Erne Drainage and Development Act (Northern Ireland) 1950 (c. 15 (N.I.)))
Landlord and Tenant (Ireland) Act 1872 (repealed)	35 & 36 Vict. c. 32	18 July 1872
An Act to explain and amend the Landlord and Tenant (Ireland) Act, 1870, (Note: Landlord and Tenant (Ireland) Act 1870 (33 & 34 Vict. c. 46)) so far as relates to the Purchase by Tenants of their holdings. (Repealed by Property (Northern Ireland) Order 1997 (SI 1997/1179))
Ballot Act 1872 (repealed)	35 & 36 Vict. c. 33	18 July 1872
An Act to amend the Law relating to Procedure at Parliamentary and Municipal Elections. (Repealed for England and Wales and Scotland by Representation of the People Act 1949 (12, 13 & 14 Geo. 6. c. 68) and for Northern Ireland by Electoral Law Act (Northern Ireland) 1962 (c. 14 (N.I.)))
Bank of England (Election of Directors) Act 1872 (repealed)	35 & 36 Vict. c. 34	18 July 1872
An Act to amend the Law relating to the Election of Directors of the Bank of England. (Repealed by Bank Act 1892 (55 & 56 Vict. c. 48))
Act of Uniformity Amendment Act 1872 or the Shortened Services Act 1872 (repealed)	35 & 36 Vict. c. 35	18 July 1872
An Act for the Amendment of the Act of Uniformity. (Note: Act of Uniformity 1662 (14 Cha. 2. c. 4)) (Repealed by Church of England (Worship and Doctrine) Measure 1974 (No. 3) (Note: Incorrectly cited as "C of E (Worship of Doctrine), 1974 (No 3)" in the Chronological Table of the Statutes.))
Baptismal Fees Abolition Act 1872	35 & 36 Vict. c. 36	18 July 1872
An Act to render it unlawful to demand any Fee or Reward for the Celebration of the Sacrament of Baptism, or the Registry thereof.
Supply (No. 3) Act 1872 (repealed)	35 & 36 Vict. c. 37	25 July 1872
An Act to apply the sum of eight million pounds out of the Consolidated Fund to the service of the year ending the thirty-first day of March one thousand eight hundred and seventy-three. (Repealed by Statute Law Revision Act 1883 (46 & 47 Vict. c. 39))
Infant Life Protection Act 1872 (repealed)	35 & 36 Vict. c. 38	25 July 1872
An Act for the better Protection of Infant Life. (Repealed by Infant Life Protection Act 1897 (60 & 61 Vict. c. 57))
Naturalization Act 1872 or the Naturalisation Act 1872 (repealed)	35 & 36 Vict. c. 39	25 July 1872
An Act for amending the Law in certain cases in relation to Naturalization. (Repealed by British Nationality Act 1948 (11 & 12 Geo. 6. c. 56))
Bishops Resignation Act Continuance Act 1872 (repealed)	35 & 36 Vict. c. 40	6 August 1872
An Act for continuing the Bishops Resignation Act, 1869. (Note: Bishops Resignation Act 1869 (32 & 33 Vict. c. 111)) (Repealed by Statute Law Revision Act 1883 (46 & 47 Vict. c. 39))
Life Assurance Companies Act 1872 (repealed)	35 & 36 Vict. c. 41	6 August 1872
An Act to amend the Life Assurance Companies Acts, 1870 (Note: Life Assurance Companies Act 1870 (33 & 34 Vict. c. 61)) and 1871. (Note: Life Assurance Companies Act 1871 (34 & 35 Vict. c. 58)) (Repealed by Assurance Companies Act 1909 (9 Edw. 7. c. 49))
Grand Jury (Ireland) Act 1872 (repealed)	35 & 36 Vict. c. 42	6 August 1872
An Act to amend an Act passed in the session of Parliament held in the sixteenth and seventeenth years of the reign of Her present Majesty for enabling Grand Juries in Ireland to borrow money from private sources on the security of Presentment, and for transferring to counties certain works constructed wholly or in part with public money. (Repealed by Statute Law Revision (No. 2) Act 1893 (56 & 57 Vict. c. 54) and Statute Law Revision Act (Northern Ireland) 1954 (c. 35 (N.I.)))
Metropolitan Tramways Provisional Orders Suspension Act 1872 (repealed)	35 & 36 Vict. c. 43	6 August 1872
An Act to enable the Board of Trade to dispense with certain provisions of the Tramways Act, 1870, (Note: Tramways Act 1870 (33 & 34 Vict. c. 78)) in respect of certain Provisional Orders. (Repealed by Statute Law Revision Act 1883 (46 & 47 Vict. c. 39))
Court of Chancery (Funds) Act 1872 (repealed)	35 & 36 Vict. c. 44	6 August 1872
An Act to abolish the office of Accountant General of the High Court of Chancery in England, and to amend the law respecting the investment of money paid into that Court, and the security and management of the moneys and effects of the suitors thereof. (Repealed by Supreme Court of Judicature (Consolidation) Act 1925 (15 & 16 Geo. 5. c. 49))
Treaty of Washington Act 1872 (repealed)	35 & 36 Vict. c. 45	6 August 1872
An Act to carry into effect a Treaty between Her Majesty and the United States of America. (Repealed by Statute Law (Repeals) Act 1976 (c. 16))
Arbitration (Masters and Workmen) Act 1872 or Mundella's Act (repealed)	35 & 36 Vict. c. 46	6 August 1872
An Act to make further provision for Arbitration between Masters and Workmen. (Repealed by Conciliation Act 1896 (59 & 60 Vict. c. 30))
Galashiels and Selkirk Act 1872 (repealed)	35 & 36 Vict. c. 47	6 August 1872
An Act to amend the Act of the thirtieth and thirty-first years of Victoria, chapter eighty-five, intituled "An Act to include the whole of the Burgh of Galashiels within the County, Sheriffdom, and Commissariot of Selkirk." (Note: Galashiels Act 1867 (30 & 31 Vict. c. 85)) (Repealed by Statute Law (Repeals) Act 1977 (c. 18))
County Boundaries, Ireland, Act 1872	35 & 36 Vict. c. 48	6 August 1872
An Act to amend the Law relating to the defining of Boundaries of Counties and other Divisions and Denominations of Land in Ireland.
Church Seats Act 1872	35 & 36 Vict. c. 49	6 August 1872
An Act to provide for the free Use of Seats in certain Churches.
Railway Rolling Stock Protection Act 1872 (repealed)	35 & 36 Vict. c. 50	6 August 1872
An Act to protect Railway Rolling Stock from Distraint when on hire. (Repealed for England and Wales and Scotland by Tribunals, Courts and Enforcement Act 2007 (c. 15) and for Northern Ireland by Judgments (Enforcement) Act (Northern Ireland) 1969 (c. 30 (N.I.)))
Judges Salaries Act 1872	35 & 36 Vict. c. 51	6 August 1872
An Act for amending the Law relating to the Salaries of Judges.
Middlesex Grand Juries Act 1872 (repealed)	35 & 36 Vict. c. 52	6 August 1872
An Act to regulate the summoning of Grand Juries in Middlesex. (Repealed by Criminal Justice Act 1948 (11 & 12 Geo. 6. c. 58))
Victoria Park Act 1872	35 & 36 Vict. c. 53	6 August 1872
An Act to confirm an Agreement for the purchase by the Metropolitan Board of Works of certain land adjoining Victoria Park, and for the appropriation of such land as part of the same Park.
Public Schools Act 1872 (repealed)	35 & 36 Vict. c. 54	6 August 1872
An Act to amend the Public Schools Act, 1868. (Note: Public Schools Act 1868 (31 & 32 Vict. c. 118)) (Repealed by Statute Law Revision Act 1883 (46 & 47 Vict. c. 39))
Basses Lights Act 1872 (repealed)	35 & 36 Vict. c. 55	6 August 1872
An Act for making better provision for the erection of Lighthouses on the Great Basses Rock, (Note: Great Basses Reef Lighthouse.) and on the Little Basses Rock, (Note: Little Basses Reef Lighthouse.) in the colony of Ceylon. (Repealed by Merchant Shipping (Mercantile Marine Fund) Act 1898 (61 & 62 Vict. c. 44))
Annuity (Lady Mayo) Act 1872 (repealed)	35 & 36 Vict. c. 56	6 August 1872
An Act to settle an annuity on the Honourable Blanche Julia Countess of Mayo, in consideration of the eminent services of the late Earl of Mayo as Viceroy and Governor General of India. (Repealed by Statute Law Revision Act 1953 (2 & 3 Eliz. 2. c. 5))
Debtors Act (Ireland) 1872 or the Debtors (Ireland) Act 1872	35 & 36 Vict. c. 57	6 August 1872
An Act for the Abolition of Imprisonment for Debt in Ireland, and for the Punishment of fraudulent Debtors, and for other purposes relating thereto.
Bankruptcy (Ireland) Amendment Act 1872	35 & 36 Vict. c. 58	6 August 1872
An Act for the Amendment of the Law of Bankruptcy in Ireland.
Elementary Education (Elections) Act 1872 (repealed)	35 & 36 Vict. c. 59	6 August 1872
An Act to amend Paragraph Three of the Second Schedule of the Elementary Education Act, 1870. (Repealed by Statute Law Revision Act 1883 (46 & 47 Vict. c. 39))
Corrupt Practices (Municipal Elections) Act 1872 or the Corrupt Practice (Municipal Elections) Act 1872 (repealed)	35 & 36 Vict. c. 60	6 August 1872
An Act for the better prevention of Corrupt Practices at Municipal Elections, and for establishing a Tribunal for the trial of the validity of such Elections. (Repealed for England and Wales by Municipal Corporations Act 1882 (45 & 46 Vict. c. 50) and for Ireland by Local Government (Ireland) Act 1898 (61 & 62 Vict. c. 37))
Steam Whistles Act 1872 (repealed)	35 & 36 Vict. c. 61	6 August 1872
An Act to regulate the use of Steam Whistles in certain Manufactories. (Repealed for England and Wales by Statute Law Revision Act 1963 (c. 30) and for Northern Ireland by Pollution Control and Local Government (Northern Ireland) Order 1978 (SI 1978/1049 (N.I. 19)))
Education (Scotland) Act 1872 (repealed)	35 & 36 Vict. c. 62	6 August 1872
An Act to amend and extend the provisions of the Law of Scotland on the subject of Education. (Repealed by Statute Law Revision Act 1883 (46 & 47 Vict. c. 39), Statute Law Revision (No. 2) Act 1893 (56 & 57 Vict. c. 54), Education (Scotland) Act 1901 (1 Edw. 7. c. 9), Education (Scotland) Act 1908 (8 Edw. 7. c. 63), Children Act 1908 (8 Edw. 7. c. 67), Education (Scotland) Act 1918 (8 & 9 Geo. 5. c. 48), Local Government (Scotland) Act 1929 (19 & 20 Geo. 5. c. 25), Reorganisation of Offices (Scotland) Act 1939 (2 & 3 Geo. 6. c. 20), Education (Scotland) Act 1945 (8 & 9 Geo. 6. c. 37) and Education (Scotland) Act 1946 (9 & 10 Geo. 6. c. 72))
Statute Law Revision Act 1872	35 & 36 Vict. c. 63	10 August 1872
An Act for further promoting the Revision of the Statute Law by repealing certain Enactments which have ceased to be in force or have become unnecessary.
Military Manœuvres Act 1872 or the Military Manoeuvres Act 1872 (repealed)	35 & 36 Vict. c. 64	10 August 1872
An Act for making provision for facilitating the Manœuvres of Troops to be assembled during the ensuing Autumn. (Repealed by Statute Law Revision Act 1883 (46 & 47 Vict. c. 39))
Bastardy Laws Amendment Act 1872 (repealed)	35 & 36 Vict. c. 65	10 August 1872
An Act to amend the Bastardy Laws. (Repealed for England and Wales by Affiliation Proceedings Act 1957 (5 & 6 Eliz. 2. c. 55) and for Northern Ireland by Summary Jurisdiction (Separation and Maintenance) Act (Northern Ireland) 1945 (c. 14 (N.I.)))
Royal Military Canal Act 1872	35 & 36 Vict. c. 66	10 August 1872
An Act to amend the Royal Military Canal Act, 1867. (Note: Royal Military Canal Act 1867 (30 & 31 Vict. c. 140))
Greenwich Hospital Act 1872	35 & 36 Vict. c. 67	10 August 1872
An Act for making further provision respecting the application of the Revenues of Greenwich Hospital.
Military Forces Localization Act 1872 or the Military Forces Localisation Act 1872 (repealed)	35 & 36 Vict. c. 68	10 August 1872
An Act to make provision for defraying the Expenses of Building Barracks and otherwise providing for the Localization of the Military Forces. (Repealed by Defence (Transfer of Functions) (No. 1) Order 1964 (SI 1964/488) and Local Government Act 1966 (c. 42))
Local Government Board (Ireland) Act 1872	35 & 36 Vict. c. 69	10 August 1872
An Act for constituting a Local Government Board in Ireland, and vesting therein certain functions of the Lord Lieutenant, the Privy Council, and the Chief Secretary to the Lord Lieutenant, concerning the Public Health and Local Government, together with the powers and duties of the Commissioners for administering the Laws for the Relief of the Poor in Ireland.
Law Officers Fees Act 1872	35 & 36 Vict. c. 70	10 August 1872
An Act to make better Provision respecting certain Fees payable to the Law Officers of the Crown for England.
Public Works Loan Commissioners Act 1872 (repealed)	35 & 36 Vict. c. 71	10 August 1872
An Act to authorise advances to the Public Works Loan Commissioners for enabling them to make Loans to School Boards in pursuance of the Elementary Education Act, 1870. (Repealed by Public Works Loans Act 1875 (38 & 39 Vict. c. 89))
Turnpike Trusts Arrangements Act 1872 (repealed)	35 & 36 Vict. c. 72	10 August 1872
An Act to confirm a certain Provisional Order made under an Act of the fifteenth year of Her present Majesty, (Note: Turnpike Trusts (Making of Provisional Orders) Act 1851 (14 & 15 Vict. c. 38)) to facilitate arrangements for the Relief of Turnpike Trusts. (Repealed by Statute Law Revision Act 1898 (61 & 62 Vict. c. 22))
Merchant Shipping Act 1872 (repealed)	35 & 36 Vict. c. 73	10 August 1872
An Act to amend the Merchant Shipping Acts and the Passenger Acts. (Repealed by Reserve Forces Act 1980 (c. 9))
Adulteration of Food and Drugs Act 1872 (repealed)	35 & 36 Vict. c. 74	10 August 1872
An Act to amend the Law for the prevention of Adulteration of Food and Drink and of Drugs. (Repealed by Sale of Food and Drugs Act 1875 (38 & 39 Vict. c. 63))
Commissioners for Oaths (Ireland) Act 1872 (repealed)	35 & 36 Vict. c. 75	10 August 1872
An Act to provide for the appointment of Commissioners in the Channel Islands, and also in the City of Dublin and its vicinity, to take Affidavits to be used in the Superior Courts of Common Law and other Courts in Ireland. (Repealed by Judicature (Northern Ireland) Act 1978 (c. 23))
Coal Mines Regulation Act 1872 (repealed)	35 & 36 Vict. c. 76	10 August 1872
An Act to consolidate and amend the Acts relating to the Regulation of Coal Mines and certain other Mines. (Repealed by Coal Mines Regulation Act 1887 (50 & 51 Vict. c. 58))
Metalliferous Mines Regulation Act 1872 (repealed)	35 & 36 Vict. c. 77	10 August 1872
An Act to consolidate and amend the Law relating to Metalliferous Mines. (Repealed for England and Wales and Scotland by Mines and Quarries Act 1954 (2 & 3 Eliz. 2. c. 70), for the Isle of Man by Isle of Man Act 1958 (6 & 7 Eliz. 2. c. 11) and for Northern Ireland by Mines Act (Northern Ireland) 1969 (c. 6 (N.I.)))
Protection of Wild Birds Act 1872 (repealed)	35 & 36 Vict. c. 78	10 August 1872
An Act for the Protection of certain Wild Birds during the Breeding Season. (Repealed by Wild Birds Protection Act 1880 (43 & 44 Vict. c. 35))
Public Health Act 1872 (repealed)	35 & 36 Vict. c. 79	10 August 1872
An Act to amend the Law relating to Public Health. (Repealed by Public Health Act 1875 (38 & 39 Vict. c. 55) and Public Health (London) Act 1891 (54 & 55 Vict. c. 76))
Kensington Station and North and South London Junction Railway Act 1859 (Repayment of Moneys) Act 1872 (repealed)	35 & 36 Vict. c. 80	10 August 1872
An Act to enable the Commissioners of Her Majesty's Treasury to pay into the High Court of Chancery in England certain moneys being the amount paid to the Paymaster General on account of Her Majesty's Treasury in respect of the non-completion of the railway authorised by "The Kensington Station and North and South London Junction Railway Act, 1859." (Note: Kensington Station and North and South London Junction Railway Act 1859 (22 & 23 Vict. c. cxxviii)) (Repealed by Statute Law Revision Act 1883 (46 & 47 Vict. c. 39))
Attorney and Solicitors Act (1860) Amendment Act 1872 or the Attorneys and Solicitors Act (1860) Amendment Act 1872 (repealed)	35 & 36 Vict. c. 81	10 August 1872
An Act to amend the Attorneys and Solicitors Act, 1860, (Note: Solicitors Act 1860 (23 & 24 Vict. c. 127)) by extending to Members of the Faculty of Advocates in Scotland the privileges conferred therein on Writers to the Signet, Solicitors before the Supreme Courts, and Procurators before the Sheriff Courts. (Repealed by Solicitors Act 1932 (22 & 23 Geo. 5. c. 37))
Income Tax (Public Offices) Act 1872 (repealed)	35 & 36 Vict. c. 82	10 August 1872
An Act to abolish Poundage for the Collection of Income Tax in public Departments. (Repealed by Income Tax Act 1918 (8 & 9 Geo. 5. c. 40))
Pensions Commutation Act 1872 (repealed)	35 & 36 Vict. c. 83	10 August 1872
An Act to extend the provisions of the Pensions Commutation Act, 1871, (Note: Pensions Commutation Act 1871 (34 & 35 Vict. c. 36)) to Officers and Clerks of Telegraph Companies who are entitled to Annuities. (Repealed by Statute Law Revision Act 1883 (46 & 47 Vict. c. 39))
Revising Barristers Act 1872 or the Appointment of Revising Barristers Act 1872 (repealed)	35 & 36 Vict. c. 84	10 August 1872
An Act to amend the Law relating to the appointment of Revising Barristers. (Repealed by Revising Barristers Act 1874 (37 & 38 Vict. c. 53))
Annual Turnpike Acts Continuance Act 1872	35 & 36 Vict. c. 85	10 August 1872
An Act to continue certain Turnpike Acts in Great Britain, to repeal certain other Turnpike Acts, and to make further provisions concerning Turnpike Roads. (Repealed for Northern Ireland by Roads (Northern Ireland) Order 1980 (SI 1980/1085 (N.I. 11)))
Borough and Local Courts of Record Act 1872 (repealed)	35 & 36 Vict. c. 86	10 August 1872
An Act to amend the law relating to Borough and other Local Courts of Record. (Repealed by Administration of Justice Act 1977 (c. 38))
Appropriation Act 1872 (repealed)	35 & 36 Vict. c. 87	10 August 1872
An Act to apply a sum out of the Consolidated Fund to the service of the year ending the thirty-first day of March one thousand eight hundred and seventy-three, and to appropriate the Supplies granted in this Session of Parliament. (Repealed by Statute Law Revision Act 1883 (46 & 47 Vict. c. 39))
Expiring Laws Continuance Act 1872 (repealed)	35 & 36 Vict. c. 88	10 August 1872
An Act to continue various expiring Laws. (Repealed by Statute Law Revision Act 1883 (46 & 47 Vict. c. 39))
Union Officers (Ireland) Act 1872	35 & 36 Vict. c. 89	10 August 1872
An Act to amend the Act (Note: Union Officers Superannuation (Ireland) Act 1865 (28 & 29 Vict. c. 26)) providing Superannuation Allowances to Officers of Unions in Ireland.
Irish Church Act 1869 Amendment Act 1872	35 & 36 Vict. c. 90	10 August 1872
An Act to amend the "Irish Church Act, 1869."
Borough Funds Act 1872 (repealed)	35 & 36 Vict. c. 91	10 August 1872
An Act to authorise the application of Funds of Municipal Corporations and other governing bodies in certain cases. (Repealed for England and Wales by Local Government Act 1933 (23 & 24 Geo. 5. c. 51), for London by London Government Act 1939 (2 & 3 Geo. 6. c. 40) and for Scotland by Local Government (Scotland) Act 1947 (10 & 11 Geo. 6. c. 43))
Parish Constables Act 1872 (repealed)	35 & 36 Vict. c. 92	10 August 1872
An Act to render unnecessary the general Appointment of Parish Constables. (Repealed by Police Act 1964 (c. 48))
Pawnbrokers Act 1872	35 & 36 Vict. c. 93	10 August 1872
An Act for consolidating, with Amendments, the Acts relating to Pawnbrokers in Great Britain.
Licensing Act 1872	35 & 36 Vict. c. 94	10 August 1872
An Act for Regulating the Sale of Intoxicating Liquors. (Repealed for Northern Ireland by Criminal Justice (Northern Ireland) Order 1980 (SI 1980/704 (N.I. 6)))
Epping Forest Amendment Act 1872 (repealed)	35 & 36 Vict. c. 95	10 August 1872
An Act to enlarge the powers of the Epping Forest Commissioners; and for other purposes. (Repealed by Wild Creatures and Forest Laws Act 1971 (c. 47))
Ecclesiastical Dilapidations Act 1872 (repealed)	35 & 36 Vict. c. 96	10 August 1872
An Act to amend the Ecclesiastical Dilapidations Act, 1871; (Note: Ecclesiastical Dilapidations Act 1871 (34 & 35 Vict. c. 43)) and for other purposes. (Repealed by Repair of Benefice Buildings Measure 1972 (No. 2))
Statute Law Revision Act 1872 (No. 2) or the Statute Law Revision (No. 2) Act 1872 (repealed)	35 & 36 Vict. c. 97	10 August 1872
An Act for promoting the Revision of the Statute Law by repealing certain Enactments which have ceased to be in force or have become unnecessary. (Repealed by Statute Law (Repeals) Act 1998 (c. 43))
Statute Law Revision (Ireland) Act 1872	35 & 36 Vict. c. 98	10 August 1872
An Act for promoting the Revision of the Statute Law by repealing certain Enactments which have ceased to be in force or have become unnecessary in Ireland.

=== Local acts ===
Short title	Citation	Royal assent
Long title
Oyster and Mussel Fisheries Orders Confirmation Act 1872	35 & 36 Vict. c. i	23 April 1872
An Act to confirm certain Orders made by the Board of Trade under The Sea Fisheries Act, 1868, (Note: Sea Fisheries Act 1868 (31 & 32 Vict. c. 45)) relating to Greshernish and Lynn Deeps.
	Greshernish Fishery Order 1872 Order for the Establishment and Maintenance, by John Robertson, of a several or exclusive Oyster and Mussel Fishery in Loch Greshernish, Isle of Skye, in the County of Inverness.	
	Lynn Deeps Fishery Order 1872 Order for the Regulation, by the Corporation of the Borough of King's Lynn, of an Oyster and Mussel Fishery in Lynn Deeps, being a portion of the Estuary called the Wash, in the County of Norfolk.	
Bristol Waterworks Act 1872	35 & 36 Vict. c. ii	13 May 1872
An Act to enlarge the powers of the Bristol Waterworks Company.
Southwark and Vauxhall Water Act 1872	35 & 36 Vict. c. iii	13 May 1872
An Act to empower the Southwark and Vauxhall Water Company to raise further Money; and for other purposes.
Watton and Swaffham Railway Act 1872	35 & 36 Vict. c. iv	13 May 1872
An Act to extend the time granted to the Watton and Swaffham Railway Company for the purchase of lands and for the construction of the Watton and Swaffham Railway.
Gloucester Gaslight Company's Act 1872	35 & 36 Vict. c. v	13 May 1872
An Act to extend the powers of the Gloucester Gaslight Company; and for other purposes.
Glasgow Court Houses Amendment Act 1872	35 & 36 Vict. c. vi	13 May 1872
An Act to incorporate the Glasgow Court Houses Commissioners, and to authorise them to borrow a further sum of money; and for other purposes.
Castleisland Railway Act 1872	35 & 36 Vict. c. vii	13 May 1872
An Act for making a railway in the county of Kerry, from Castleisland to Gortatlea, on the Great Southern and Western Railway; and for other purposes.
Cork Improvement Act 1872	35 & 36 Vict. c. viii	13 May 1872
An Act to enable the Mayor, Aldermen, and Burgesses of the Borough of Cork to make a diversion of the substituted Railways of the Cork, Blackrock, and Passage Railway, authorised by "The Cork Improvement Act, 1868;" (Note: Cork Improvement Act 1868 (31 & 32 Vict. c. xxxiii)) to authorise agreements with the Cork, Blackrock, and Passage Railway Company and the Cork Harbour Commissioners; to raise further moneys; and for other purposes.
Berwick-upon-Tweed Harbour Act 1872	35 & 36 Vict. c. ix	13 May 1872
An Act for empowering the Berwick Harbour Commissioners to make a Wet Dock and other Works, and for conferring other powers on those Commissioners, and for extending and amending the enactments relating to them; and for other purposes.
Dundee Water Amendment Act 1872 (repealed)	35 & 36 Vict. c. x	13 May 1872
An Act for enabling the Dundee Water Commissioners to relinquish certain Works for supplying Water to Dundee and suburbs and places adjacent, authorised by "The Dundee Water Extension Act, 1871," (Note: Dundee Water Extension Act 1871 (34 & 35 Vict. c. cix)) and to make new and other Works in substitution thereof; and for other purposes. (Repealed by Dundee Corporation (Water, Transport, Finance, &c.) Order Confirmation Act 1954 (2 & 3 Eliz. 2. c. ix))
Upwell, Outwell, Denver and Welney Level Act 1872	35 & 36 Vict. c. xi	13 May 1872
An Act for amending the Act relating to the draining and improving of certain Fen Lands within the manors and parishes of Upwell and Outwell and in the parishes of Denver and Welney, in the Isle of Ely and counties of Cambridge and Norfolk; and for other purposes.
Glasgow and Kilmarnock Joint Line (Extension of Time) Act 1872	35 & 36 Vict. c. xii	13 May 1872
An Act for extending the time for the completion of certain portions of the Glasgow and Kilmarnock Joint Line of Railway; for reviving the powers of compulsory purchase of Lands for the purposes thereof; for authorising the construction of a Branch Railway in connexion with the Joint Line; for empowering the Glasgow and South-western Railway Company to acquire Land at Kilmarnock; and for other purposes.
Tyne Coal Dues Act 1872 (repealed)	35 & 36 Vict. c. xiii	13 May 1872
An Act to abolish the Tyne Coal Dues, and in lieu thereof to provide new Dues; to extinguish the right to increase rates under "The Harbours and Passing Tolls, &c. Act, 1861;" (Note: Harbours and Passing Tolls, &c. Act 1861 (24 & 25 Vict. c. 47)) and to extend the time for the completion of the piers and other works. (Repealed by Port of Tyne Reorganisation Scheme 1967 Confirmation Order 1968 (SI 1968/942))
Pontypridd Stipendiary Magistrate's Act 1872 (repealed)	35 & 36 Vict. c. xiv	13 May 1872
An Act for the appointment of a Stipendiary Magistrate for the Petty Sessional Division of Pontypridd in the county of Glamorgan; and for other purposes. (Repealed by Pontypridd Stipendiary Magistrate Act 1920 (10 & 11 Geo. 5. c. lxxxvi))
Swansea Local Board of Health Act 1872 (repealed)	35 & 36 Vict. c. xv	13 May 1872
An Act to enable the Local Board of Health for the Town and District of Swansea to provide for certain of their existing debts by the issue of Annuities and Debenture Stock; and for other purposes. (Repealed by West Glamorgan Water Board Order 1966 (SI 1966/1096))
Liverpool Hydraulic Power Company's Act 1872	35 & 36 Vict. c. xvi	13 May 1872
An Act for the Incorporation of the Liverpool Hydraulic Power Company, and for other purposes.
Dundee Gas Amendment Act 1872 (repealed)	35 & 36 Vict. c. xvii	13 May 1872
An Act for making additional provision for the supply of Gas to the Burgh of Dundee and suburbs and places adjacent; for amending and extending the Act (Note: Dundee Gas Act 1868 (31 & 32 Vict. c. xciv)) relating to such supply; for extending the limits of supply; and for other purposes. (Repealed by Dundee Corporation (Consolidated Powers) Order Confirmation Act 1957 (6 & 7 Eliz. 2. c. iv))
Hull Hydraulic Power Company's Act 1872	35 & 36 Vict. c. xviii	13 May 1872
An Act for the Incorporation of the Hull Hydraulic Power Company, and for other purposes.
Castell Coch Bridge Act 1872	35 & 36 Vict. c. xix	13 May 1872
An Act for making and maintaining a Bridge across the river Taff at a place called Castell Coch, in the parishes of Pentyrch and Eglwysilan, in the county of Glamorgan, and for making convenient approaches thereto.
Hutchesons Hospital Act 1872	35 & 36 Vict. c. xx	13 May 1872
An Act for enlarging the powers of the Royal Incorporation of Hutchesons Hospital in the city of Glasgow, and for regulating the management thereof and of the Mortifications therewith connected; and for other purposes.
Rhondda Valley and Hirwain Junction Railway Act 1872	35 & 36 Vict. c. xxi	13 May 1872
An Act to enable the Rhondda Valley and Hirwain Junction Railway Company to make a deviation in and extension of their authorised undertaking; and for other purposes.
Staines Town Hall and Market Act 1872	35 & 36 Vict. c. xxii	13 May 1872
An Act to authorise the establishment of a Market and the construction of a Town Hall at Staines in the county of Middlesex; and for other purposes.
Gaslight and Coke Company's Act 1872	35 & 36 Vict. c. xxiii	13 May 1872
An Act to amend the Gaslight and Coke Company's Act, 1868, (Note: Gaslight and Coke Company's Act 1868 (31 & 32 Vict. c. cvi)) and the Schemes confirmed under the authority of the City of London Gas Act, 1868, (Note: City of London Gas Act 1868 (31 & 32 Vict. c. cxxv)) for the amalgamation of the City of London Gaslight and Coke Company and the Great Central Gas Consumers Company with the Gaslight and Coke Company, and to authorise the Gaslight and Coke Company to raise additional capital; and for other purposes.
Great Eastern Railway Act 1872	35 & 36 Vict. c. xxiv	13 May 1872
An Act to authorise the Great Eastern Railway Company to make a deviation in the connexion between their Railway and the North London Railway, and to abandon certain railways, and to extend the time for making certain other railways, and to acquire additional lands, and to confer further powers upon the said Company with reference to their undertaking and capital; and for other purposes.
Glasgow, Renfrew and Three Mile House Turnpike Roads Act 1872	35 & 36 Vict. c. xxv	13 May 1872
An Act for uniting and continuing the term of the Glasgow and Renfrew Bridge and the Glasgow and Three Mile House Turnpike Road Trusts, and appointing a new body of Trustees; and for other purposes.
East Gloucestershire Railway Act 1872	35 & 36 Vict. c. xxvi	13 May 1872
An Act to authorise the East Gloucestershire Railway Company to reduce their Share Capital; and for other purposes.
Serle Street and Cook's Court Improvement Act 1872	35 & 36 Vict. c. xxvii	27 June 1872
An Act to authorise improvements in and near Serle Street and Cook's Court in the parish of Saint Clement Danes in the county of Middlesex; and for other purposes.
Yarmouth and Ventnor Railway, Tramway, and Pier (Deviations) Act 1872	35 & 36 Vict. c. xxviii	27 June 1872
An Act to enable the Yarmouth and Ventnor Railway, Tramway, and Pier Company to make deviations in their authorised undertakings; and for other purposes.
Trinity Church, Gray's Inn Road, Schools Act 1872	35 & 36 Vict. c. xxix	27 June 1872
An Act to authorise the appropriation of a part of the disused burial ground of Saint Andrew's, Gray's Inn Road, in the county of Middlesex, to the purpose of erecting thereon school buildings for the district parish of the Holy Trinity, Gray's Inn Road; and for other purposes.
Aberystwyth Improvement and Water Act 1872	35 & 36 Vict. c. xxx	27 June 1872
An Act to amend an Act passed in the fifth and sixth year of the reign of His late Majesty King William IV., intituled "An Act for improving and regulating the town of Aberystwyth in the county of Cardigan, and for supplying the inhabitants thereof with water," (Note: Aberystwyth Improvement Act 1835 (5 & 6 Will. 4. c. xlvi)) to authorise the Commissioners executing such Act to construct additional waterworks, to purchase gasworks, establish marlets, to extend the limits of the district, to borrow further moneys; and for other purposes.
Manchester Corporation Waterworks and Improvement Act 1872 or the Manchester Corporation Waterworks Act 1872	35 & 36 Vict. c. xxxi	27 June 1872
An Act for enabling the Mayor Aldermen and Citizens of the city of Manchester in the county of Lancaster to make new streets with a bridge over the River Irwell, and to acquire additional lands for Cemetery and other purposes, and for making further provision respecting the borrowing of money by them; and for other purposes.
Paisley Burgh and Cart Navigation Act 1872	35 & 36 Vict. c. xxxii	27 June 1872
An Act for regulating the affairs of the Burgh of Paisley and the River Cart Navigation; and for other purposes.
Ilfracombe Gas Act 1872	35 & 36 Vict. c. xxxiii	27 June 1872
An Act to incorporate a Company, to be called "The Ilfracombe Gas Company," to provide for the lighting of the town and parish of Ilfracombe; and for other purposes.
Darlington Borough Sewage Irrigation Act 1872	35 & 36 Vict. c. xxxiv	27 June 1872
An Act for the better sewering and draining of the Borough of Darlington, and the applying of the Sewage to the Irrigation of Land; for extending the existing main or outfall sewer; and for other purposes.
Newport and Pillgwenlly Waterworks Extension Act 1872	35 & 36 Vict. c. xxxv	27 June 1872
An Act to authorise the Newport and Pillgwenlly Waterworks Company to construct further works and to raise additional capital; and for other purposes.
Corn Exchange Act 1872 (repealed)	35 & 36 Vict. c. xxxvi	27 June 1872
An Act for incorporating and conferring powers on the Proprietors of the Corn Exchange in Mark Lane in the City of London; and for other purposes. (Repealed by Corn Exchange Act 1975 (c. xii))
Hill's Trust Act 1872	35 & 36 Vict. c. xxxvii	27 June 1872
An Act to incorporate the Trustees of Abraham Hill's School Trust, and to confer upon them powers for the better administration of the said Trust.
Wilmslow Gas Act 1872	35 & 36 Vict. c. xxxviii	27 June 1872
An Act to incorporate the Wilmslow and Alderley Edge Gas Company, and grant them powers to improve their works, increase their capital and limits of supply; and for other purposes.
Itchen Floating Bridge Act 1872 (repealed)	35 & 36 Vict. c. xxxix	27 June 1872
An Act to amend the Acts relating to the Itchen Floating Bridge; and for other purposes. (Repealed by Southampton Corporation Act 1973 (c. xix))
Devon and Somerset Railway Act 1872	35 & 36 Vict. c. xl	27 June 1872
An Act for enabling the Devon and Somerset Railway Company to raise additional capital; and for other purposes.
Glasgow Municipal Act 1872	35 & 36 Vict. c. xli	27 June 1872
An Act to extend the Municipal Boundaries of the City of Glasgow; to regulate the office of the Town Clerk; and for other purposes.
Altrincham Gas Act 1872	35 & 36 Vict. c. xlii	27 June 1872
An Act for incorporating and conferring further powers on the Altrincham Gas Company.
Metropolitan Commons Supplemental Act 1872	35 & 36 Vict. c. xliii	27 June 1872
An Act to confirm a scheme under "The Metropolitan Commons Act, 1866," (Note: Metropolitan Commons Act 1866 (29 & 30 Vict. c. 122)) relating to Hackney Commons.
	Scheme with respect to Hackney Commons.	
Public Health (Scotland) Supplemental Act 1872	35 & 36 Vict. c. xliv	27 June 1872
An Act to confirm a Provisional Order under the "Public Health (Scotland) Act, 1867," (Note: Public Health (Scotland) Act 1867 (30 & 31 Vict. c. 101)) relating to the Burgh of Brechin.
	Brechin Order 1872 Brechin. "Public Health (Scotland) Act, 1867," (30 & 31 Vict. c. 101.)	
Local Government Supplemental Act 1872	35 & 36 Vict. c. xlv	27 June 1872
An Act to confirm a Provisional Order under "The Local Government Act, 1858," (Note: Local Government Act 1858 (21 & 22 Vict. c. 98)) relating to the district of Kingston-upon-Hull.
	Kingston-upon-Hull Order 1872 Provisional Order partially repealing and altering a Local Act (Note: Hull Market Place and Dock Improvement Act 1801 (41 Geo. 3. (U.K.) c. lxv)) in force within the District of the Borough of Kingston-upon-Hull.	
North British, Arbroath, and Montrose Railway Act 1872	35 & 36 Vict. c. xlvi	27 June 1872
An Act to authorise the North British, Arbroath, and Montrose Railway Company to make and maintain certain new Railways; and for other purposes.
Mid-Wales Railway Act 1872	35 & 36 Vict. c. xlvii	27 June 1872
An Act to extend for a further period the time limited by "The Mid-Wales Railway Act, 1869," (Note: Mid-Wales Railway Act 1869 (32 & 33 Vict. c. cxiii)) for the compulsory purchase of lands and completion of works authorised by "The Mid-Wales Railway (Western Extensions) Act, 1865," (Note: Mid Wales Railway (Western Extensions) Act 1865 (28 & 29 Vict. c. ccclxxi)) and to enable the Mid-Wales Railway Company to use a portion of the Railway and the Barton Station of the Great Western Railway Company at Hereford; and for other purposes.
Longton, Adderley Green, and Bucknall Railway Act 1872	35 & 36 Vict. c. xlviii	27 June 1872
An Act to authorise a Deviation from the authorised line of the Longton, Adderley Green, and Bucknall Railway, the abandonment of some portions of that railway, and to revive and extend the time for the purchase of lands for and to extend the time for the completion of that railway; and for other purposes.
Metropolis (Kilburn and Harrow) Roads Act 1872	35 & 36 Vict. c. xlix	27 June 1872
An Act to make provision for the future Maintenance and Repair of certain Roads now under the care of the Commissioners of the Metropolis Turnpike Roads North of the Thames, and to amend "The Annual Turnpike Acts Continuance Act, 1871;" (Note: Annual Turnpike Acts Continuance Act 1871 (34 & 35 Vict. c. 115)) and for other purposes.
Blyth and Tyne Railway Act 1872	35 & 36 Vict. c. l	27 June 1872
An Act to authorise the Blyth and Tyne Railway Company to make new Lines of Railway at and near North Shields, to alter their authorised Newbiggin Branch Railway; and for other purposes.
Carnarvon Consumers Gas Act 1872	35 & 36 Vict. c. li	27 June 1872
An Act to incorporate the Carnarvon Consumers Gas Company, and to enable them to supply with Gas Carnarvon and its neighbourhood.
Whitby Market Act 1872	35 & 36 Vict. c. lii	27 June 1872
An Act to improve and enlarge the present Market Place, and to erect a new covered Market, Buildings, and Conveniences in the town and parish of Whitby, in the county of York; and for other purposes.
Severn Tunnel Railway Act 1872	35 & 36 Vict. c. liii	27 June 1872
An Act to authorise the construction of the Severn Tunnel Railway; and for other purposes in connexion therewith.
East Norfolk Railway Act 1872	35 & 36 Vict. c. liv	27 June 1872
An Act to authorise the extension to Cromer of the East Norfolk Railway, and an alteration of that railway, and to give further time for the compulsory purchase of lands for that railway, and for its completion; and for other purposes affecting the East Norfolk Railway Company and the Great Eastern Railway Company.
Neath and Brecon Railway Act 1872	35 & 36 Vict. c. lv	27 June 1872
An Act to confer additional powers on the Neath and Brecon Railway Company; and for other purposes.
Newtown Waterworks Act 1872	35 & 36 Vict. c. lvi	27 June 1872
An Act for supplying with Water the town and district of Newtown in the county of Montgomery.
Cheshire Lines Act 1872	35 & 36 Vict. c. lvii	27 June 1872
An Act for conferring further powers on the Cheshire Lines Committee, and upon the three Companies represented upon that Committee; for amending the Acts relating to and making further provision respecting the railways and works belonging to or under the management of the Committee; and for other purposes.
Metropolitan Railway Act 1872	35 & 36 Vict. c. lviii	27 June 1872
An Act to extend the powers of the Metropolitan Railway Company with respect to their railway between Moorgate and Tower Hill; and for other purposes with relation to the same Company.
Sheffield Market Act 1872 (repealed)	35 & 36 Vict. c. lix	27 June 1872
An Act for providing additional Market Accommodation for the town of Sheffield, and to amend the Sheffield Market Act, 1847; (Note: Sheffield Markets Act 1847 (10 & 11 Vict. c. xlv)) and for other purposes. (Repealed by Sheffield Corporation (Consolidation) Act 1918 (8 & 9 Geo. 5. c. lxi))
Crystal Palace and South London Junction Railway Act 1872	35 & 36 Vict. c. lx	27 June 1872
An Act to make provision for the payment of the debts and the application of the future Revenues of the Crystal Palace and South London Junction Railway Company; and for other purposes.
Madras Irrigation and Canal Act 1872	35 & 36 Vict. c. lxi	27 June 1872
An Act to amend the Madras Irrigation and Canal Acts in reference to the raising of money.
Poole and Bournemouth Railway Act 1872	35 & 36 Vict. c. lxii	27 June 1872
An Act for extending the time for the completion of the Poole and Bournemouth Railway; and for other purposes.
Oyster and Mussel Fisheries Orders Confirmation Act 1872 (No. 2) or the Oyster and Mussel Fisheries Orders Confirmation (No. 2) Act 1872	35 & 36 Vict. c. lxiii	27 June 1872
An Act to confirm an Order made by the Board of Trade under The Sea Fisheries Act, 1868, relating to Salcombe.
	Salcombe River Fishery Order 1872 Order for the Establishment and Maintenance by Jonathan Russell, of Gillingham, of a Several Oyster and Mussel Fishery in Salcombe River, in the County of Devon.	
Drainage and Improvement of Lands Supplemental Act (Ireland) 1872 or the Drainage and Improvement of Lands Supplemental (Ireland) Act 1872	35 & 36 Vict. c. lxiv	27 June 1872
An Act to confirm Provisional Orders under "The Drainage and Improvement of Lands (Ireland) Act, 1863," (Note: Drainage and Improvement of Lands (Ireland) Act 1863 (26 & 27 Vict. c. 88)) and the Acts amending the same.
	Boolinarrig Drainage District Order 1872 In the matter of the Boolinarrig Drainage District, in the King's County.	
	River Torrent Drainage District Order 1872 In the matter of the River Torrent Drainage District, in the County of Tyrone.	
Education Department Provisional Order Confirmation Act 1872	35 & 36 Vict. c. lxv	27 June 1872
An Act to confirm a Provisional Order made by the Education Department under "The Elementary Education Act, 1870," (Note: Elementary Education Act 1870 (33 & 34 Vict. c. 75)) to enable the School Board for London to put in force "The Lands Clauses Consolidation Act, 1845," (Note: Lands Clauses Consolidation Act 1845 (8 & 9 Vict. c. 18)) and the Acts amending the same.
	London Order 1872 Provisional Order for putting in force the Lands Clauses Consolidation Act, 1845.	
Thames Embankment North Act 1872 (repealed)	35 & 36 Vict. c. lxvi	27 June 1872
An Act for amending and extending The Thames Embankment Act, 1862; (Note: Thames Embankment Act 1862 (25 & 26 Vict. c. 93)) and for other purposes. (Repealed by Local Law (Greater London Council and Inner London Boroughs) Order 1965 (SI 1965/540))
Tramways Order Confirmation (Ireland) Act 1872	35 & 36 Vict. c. lxvii	27 June 1872
An Act to confirm a Provisional Order made by the Lord Lieutenant of Ireland in Council, under the Tramways (Ireland) Act, 1860, (Note: Tramways (Ireland) Act 1860 (23 & 24 Vict. c. 152)) and the Tramways (Ireland) Amendment Act, 1861, (Note: Tramways (Ireland) Amendment Act 1861 (24 & 25 Vict. c. 102)) extending the time for completing Tramways in the Borough of Cork.
	Cork Tramways (Extension of Time) Order 1872 Order in Council, dated 30th May 1872, extending to the 16th day of July 1872 the time fixed by an Order in Council of the 19th October 1871 for completing certain tramways in the borough of Cork.	
Pier and Harbour Orders Confirmation Act 1872 (No. 1) or the Pier and Harbour Orders Confirmation (No. 1) Act 1872	35 & 36 Vict. c. lxviii	27 June 1872
An Act to confirm certain Provisional Orders made by the Board of Trade under The General Pier and Harbour Act, 1861, (Note: General Pier and Harbour Act 1861 (24 & 25 Vict. c. 45)) relating to Cruden, Dundrum, Gill, Gosport, Herne Bay, Llanfairfechan, Skerries, and Withernsea.
	Cruden Harbour Order 1872 Order for the Construction, Maintenance, and Regulation of a Harbour at the Village of Ward of Cruden, in the Parish of Cruden and County of Aberdeen.	
	Dundrum Harbour Order 1872 Order for the Maintenance and Regulation of the Harbour of Dundrum in the County of Down.	
	Gill Pier Order 1872 Order for the Construction, Maintenance, and Regulation of a Pier at Gill, in the Bay of Pierowall, Island of Westray, and County of Orkney.	
	Gosport Wharf and Pier Order 1872 Order for the Construction, Maintenance, and Regulation of a Wharf and Pier or Jetty at Gosport, in the County of Southampton, and other Works in connexion therewith.	
	Herne Bay Promenade Pier Order 1872 Order for the Construction, Maintenance, and Regulation of a Pier and other Works at Herne Bay, in the County of Kent.	
	Llanfairfechan Dock Order 1872 Order for the Construction, Maintenance, and Regulation of a Dock, Piers, and other Works in the Parish of Llanfairfechan, in the County of Carnarvon.	
	Skerries Harbour Improvement Order 1872 Order for the Construction, Maintenance, and Regulation of the Pier and Harbour of Skerries, in the Parish of Holmpatrick, in the County of Dublin.	
	Withernsea Pier Order 1872 Order for the Construction, Maintenance, and Regulation of a Pier at Owthorn, adjoining Withernsea, in the East Riding of the County of York.	
Gas and Water Orders Confirmation Act 1872	35 & 36 Vict. c. lxix	27 June 1872
An Act to confirm certain Provisional Orders made by the Board of Trade under The Gas and Water Works Facilities Act, 1870, (Note: Gas and Water Works Facilities Act 1870 (33 & 34 Vict. c. 70)) relating to Bungay Gas, East Ardsley Gas, Elstree and Boreham Wood Gas, Portsea Island Gas, Wellington (Salop) Gas, Bridge of Allan Water, Cosham, Havant, and Emsworth Water, Gosport Water, Wells Water, Blaenavon Gas and Water, and Ystrad Gas and Water.
	Bungay Gas Order 1872	
	East Ardsley Gaslight Order 1872	
	Elstree and Boreham Wood Gas Order 1872	
	Portsea Island Gas Order 1872	
	Wellington (Salop.) Gas Order 1872	
	Bridge of Allan Water Order 1872	
	Cosham, Havant and Emsworth Water Order 1872	
	Gosport Water Order 1872	
	Wells Water Order 1872	
	Blaenavon Gas and Water Order 1872	
	Ystrad Gas and Water Order 1872	
Gas and Water Orders Confirmation Act 1872 (No. 2) or the Gas and Water Orders Confirmation (No. 2) Act 1872	35 & 36 Vict. c. lxx	27 June 1872
An Act to confirm certain Provisional Orders made by the Board of Trade under the Gas and Water Works Facilities Act, 1870, relating to Cleator Moor Gas, Ossett Gas, Ruthin Gas, Swinton and Mexbrough Gas, Kettering Water, and Margate Water.
	Cleator Moor Gas Order 1872	
	Ossett Gas Order 1872	
	Ruthin Gas Order 1872	
	Swinton and Mexbrough Gas Order 1872	
	Kettering Waterworks Order 1872	
	Margate Water Order 1872	
Greenock Harbour Act 1872 (repealed)	35 & 36 Vict. c. lxxi	27 June 1872
An Act for enabling the Trustees of the Port and Harbours of Greenock to make a Wet Dock and approaches and other works; and for other purposes. (Repealed by Greenock Port and Harbours Consolidation Act 1913 (3 & 4 Geo. 5. c. xlii))
Tamworth Gaslight and Coke Company Act 1872	35 & 36 Vict. c. lxxii	27 June 1872
An Act for incorporating the Tamworth Gaslight and Coke Company, and extending their powers, and for authorising additional Works and the raising of further Moneys; and for other purposes.
Birstal Local Board Act 1872	35 & 36 Vict. c. lxxiii	27 June 1872
An Act to enable the Local Board for the District of Birstal to purchase the Birstal Gasworks; to take Lands for Sewage purposes; to provide Markets, a Town Hall, and other public buildings; and for other purposes.
Waterford and Central Ireland Railway Act 1872	35 & 36 Vict. c. lxxiv	27 June 1872
An Act to confer further powers on the Waterford and Central Ireland Railway Company and the Kilkenny Junction Railway Company; and for other purposes.
Lymm Local Board (Gas) Act 1872	35 & 36 Vict. c. lxxv	27 June 1872
An Act to enable the Local Board for the district of Lymm to make and supply Gas; to purchase the Undertaking of the Lymm Gas Company (Limited); to confer other powers in relation to Gas on the said Local Board; and for other purposes.
Sandbach and Winsford Junction Railway Act 1872 (repealed)	35 & 36 Vict. c. lxxvi	27 June 1872
An Act for making a Railway from Sandbach to Winsford, in the county of Chester; and for other purposes. (Repealed by Statute Law (Repeals) Act 2013 (c. 2))
Orkney Piers and Harbours Act 1872 (repealed)	35 & 36 Vict. c. lxxvii	27 June 1872
An Act to facilitate the construction, improvement, maintenance, and regulation of Piers in the Islands of Orkney; for making better provision for the conservancy of the Harbours therein; and for other purposes. (Repealed by Orkney Islands Council Order Confirmation Act 1978 (c. iv))
Bolton Corporation Act 1872	35 & 36 Vict. c. lxxviii	18 July 1872
An Act for empowering the Mayor, Aldermen, and Burgesses of the Borough of Bolton to make Street Improvements and additional Waterworks, and for transferring to them Gasworks; and for amending the Acts relating to the Borough; and for other purposes.
Bridport Waterworks Act 1872	35 & 36 Vict. c. lxxix	18 July 1872
An Act for better supplying with Water the Borough of Bridport and other places in the county of Dorset.
Hindley Local Board Act 1872	35 & 36 Vict. c. lxxx	18 July 1872
An Act to enable the Local Board for the district of Hindley in the county of Lancaster to purchase the Undertaking of the Hindley Gas, Coke, Meter, and Fitting Company, Limited, and to supply Gas within the said district and the neighbourhood thereof; to erect Waterworks; and to confer other powers in relation to Gas and Water on the said Local Board; and for other purposes.
Holborn Valley and Farringdon Market Improvement Act 1872 (repealed)	35 & 36 Vict. c. lxxxi	18 July 1872
An Act for authorising additional Works in connexion with the Holborn Valley and Farringdon Market Improvements; and for other purposes. (Repealed by City of London (Various Powers) Act 1969 (c. xxxix))
Newport Market Act 1872 (repealed)	35 & 36 Vict. c. lxxxii	18 July 1872
An Act for making and maintaining a General Market, on or near to the site of the Old Newport Market, and certain new Streets and Improvements in connexion therewith, in the parishes of Saint Ann, Soho, and Saint Martin-in-the-Fields. (Repealed by Statute Law (Repeals) Act 2008 (c. 12))
Furness Railway (Steamboats) Act 1872	35 & 36 Vict. c. lxxxiii	18 July 1872
An Act for authorising the Furness Railway Company to provide and use Steam and other Vessels on Windermere Lake and Coniston Lake; and for other purposes.
Bannow Slob Land Reclamation Act 1872	35 & 36 Vict. c. lxxxiv	18 July 1872
An Act for embanking and reclaiming certain mud or slob lands in the county of Wexford.
Ballymena, Cushendall and Redbay Railway Act 1872	35 & 36 Vict. c. lxxxv	18 July 1872
An Act for making a Railway from the Belfast and Northern Counties Railway at Ballymena to Cushendall and Redbay; and for other purposes.
Brighton Corporation Waterworks Act 1872 (repealed)	35 & 36 Vict. c. lxxxvi	18 July 1872
An Act for vesting the Undertaking of the Brighton, Hove, and Preston (Constant Service) Waterworks Company in the Corporation of Brighton, and for extending the Limits for the Supply of Water to certain Neighbouring Places; and for other purposes. (Repealed by Brighton Corporation Act 1931 (21 & 22 Geo. 5. c. cix))
London and North Western Railway (Additional Powers) Act 1872	35 & 36 Vict. c. lxxxvii	18 July 1872
An Act for conferring additional powers on the London and North-western Railway Company in relation to their own Undertaking and the Undertakings of other Companies; and for other purposes.
Wigtownshire Railway Act 1872	35 & 36 Vict. c. lxxxviii	18 July 1872
An Act for making a Railway from Newton Stewart to Whithorn and a Tramway to Garlies Town, in the county of Wigtown; and for other purposes.
Wainfleet and Firsby Railway (Extension to Skegness) Act 1872	35 & 36 Vict. c. lxxxix	18 July 1872
An Act for authorising the Wainfleet and Firsby Railway Company to extend their Railway from Wainfleet All Saints to Skegness; and to raise further moneys; and for other purposes.
Kilrush and Kilkee Railway and Poulnasherry Reclamation Act 1872	35 & 36 Vict. c. xc	18 July 1872
An Act to revive and extend the powers of the several Acts relating to the "Kilrush and Kilkee Railway and Poulnasherry Reclamation Company" passed in the years 1860, (Note: Kilrush and Kilkee Railway and Poulnasherry Reclamation Act 1860 (23 & 24 Vict. c. clv)) 1861, (Note: Kilrush and Kilkee Railway and Poulnasherry Reclamation Amendment Act 1861 (24 & 25 Vict. c. xxix)) and 1865; (Note: Kilrush and Kilkee Railway Act 1865 (28 & 29 Vict. c. cxxx)) and for other purposes.
North Monkland Railways Act 1872	35 & 36 Vict. c. xci	18 July 1872
An Act for making Railways in the counties of Lanark and Stirling, to be called "The North Monkland Railways;" and for other purposes.
Local Government Board's Provisional Orders Confirmation Act 1872	35 & 36 Vict. c. xcii	18 July 1872
An Act to confirm certain Provisional Orders of the Local Government Board relating to the Districts of East Barnet, Banbury, Glastonbury, Knaresborough and Tentergate, Nottingham, Shipley, Soothill Upper, and Swadlincote.
	East Barnet Order 1872	
	Banbury Order 1872	
	Glastonbury Order 1872	
	Knaresborough and Tentergate Order 1872	
	Nottingham Order 1872	
	Shipley Order 1872	
	Soothill Upper Order 1872	
	Swadlincote Order 1872	
Pier and Harbour Orders Confirmation Act 1872 (No. 2) or the Pier and Harbour Orders Confirmation (No. 2) Act 1872	35 & 36 Vict. c. xciii	18 July 1872
An Act to confirm certain Provisional Orders made by the Board of Trade under The General Pier and Harbour Act, 1861, relating to Aldborough and Lynmouth.
	Aldborough Harbour Order 1872	
	Lynmouth Pier and Harbour Order 1872	
Sutton Harbour (Tramways) Act 1872	35 & 36 Vict. c. xciv	18 July 1872
An Act for authorising the Sutton Harbour Improvement Company to construct Tramways and other Works and to raise further Moneys; and for other purposes.
Witney Railway Act 1872	35 & 36 Vict. c. xcv	18 July 1872
An Act to enable the Witney Railway Company to borrow further Moneys; to confer powers with reference to traffic and other arrangements on the Witney, Great Western, and East Gloucestershire Railway Companies; and for other purposes.
Limerick Markets Act 1872	35 & 36 Vict. c. xcvi	18 July 1872
An Act to alter and amend the provisions of "The Limerick Markets Act, 1852," (Note: Limerick Markets Act 1852 (15 & 16 Vict. c. civ)) and "The Limerick Markets Act, 1862," (Note: Limerick Markets Act 1862 (25 & 26 Vict. c. xxiii)) with reference to Tolls, and to give further powers to the Limerick Markets Trustees; and for other purposes.
Leeds Improvement Act 1872 (repealed)	35 & 36 Vict. c. xcvii	18 July 1872
An Act to enable the Mayor, Aldermen, and Burgesses of the Borough of Leeds to make new and improve existing Streets; to make further provision with respect to Streets and Buildings; to raise further Moneys for the providing of Parks; and for the further Improvement and better Government of the said borough; and for other purposes. (Repealed by West Yorkshire Act 1980 (c. xiv))
Weaver Navigation Act 1872	35 & 36 Vict. c. xcviii	18 July 1872
An Act to enable the Trustees of the River Weaver Navigation to make a Communication at Anderton between their Navigation and the Trent and Mersey Canal, and for other purposes with respect to the same Trust.
Furness Railway Act 1872	35 & 36 Vict. c. xcix	18 July 1872
An Act for conferring additional powers upon the Furness Railway Company for the construction of Works and the raising of Money, and otherwise in relation to their Undertaking; and for other purposes.
Metage on Grain (Port of London) Act 1872 (repealed)	35 & 36 Vict. c. c	18 July 1872
An Act for abolishing the compulsory Metage on Grain imported into the port of London and for commuting the metage dues received by the Corporation of the city of London, into a fixed due, and for creating thereby a Fund to be applied towards the preservation of Open Spaces near London; and for other purposes connected therewith. (Repealed by Statute Law (Repeals) Act 2008 (c. 12))
Warwick Local Board Waterworks Act 1872 (repealed)	35 & 36 Vict. c. ci	18 July 1872
An Act for enabling the Local Board of Health for the District of the Borough of Warwick to execute Works for the Improvement of the Water Supply of their District; and for other purposes. (Repealed by South Warwickshire Water Board Order 1963 (SI 1963/38))
Hemel Hempstead and London and North Western Railway Act 1872	35 & 36 Vict. c. cii	18 July 1872
An Act to authorise the Hemel Hempsted and London and North-western Railway Company to extend their Railway at Boxmoor; to divert and alter the line and levels of their Extension to Harpenden; and for other purposes.
Canterbury and Herne Bay Railway Act 1872	35 & 36 Vict. c. ciii	18 July 1872
An Act to authorise the construction of Railways between Canterbury and Herne Bay, in the county of Kent; and for other purposes.
Rhyl Improvement Act 1872	35 & 36 Vict. c. civ	18 July 1872
An Act to extend the limits of the jurisdiction of the Rhyl Improvement Commissioners, and to enable them to make new and extend existing Roads, to construct Works for Sewerage and Sewage Utilization, to acquire the Undertaking of the Rhyl Bridge Company and the Rhyl Promenade Pier Company, Limited; and to make further provision with respect to new Streets and Buildings, and the Improvement and Government of the Town of Rhyl.
Nottingham and Leen District Sewerage Act 1872 (repealed)	35 & 36 Vict. c. cv	18 July 1872
An Act for securing the Purification and preventing the Pollution of the Water of the Trent and Leen in and in the neighbourhood of the town of Nottingham; and for other purposes. (Repealed by Statute Law (Repeals) Act 1995 (c. 44))
Waterford, Dungarvan, and Lismore Railway Act 1872	35 & 36 Vict. c. cvi	18 July 1872
An Act to authorise the construction of a Railway from Waterford to Dungarvan and Lismore, in the county of Waterford, to be called "The Waterford, Dungarvan, and Lismore Railway;" and for other purposes.
Haworth Local Board of Health Act 1872	35 & 36 Vict. c. cvii	18 July 1872
An Act for empowering the Local Board of Health for the District of Haworth, in the parish of Bradford in the West Riding of the county of York, to make and to supply Gas; and for confirming an Agreement between them and the Haworth Gas Company, Limited, for the Purchase of that Company's Undertaking; and for conferring powers on the Local Board in relation to the Regulation of Buildings, Streets, Slaughter-houses, and other matters; and for other purposes.
Keighley Waterworks and Improvement Act 1872	35 & 36 Vict. c. cviii	18 July 1872
An Act to authorise the Local Board of Health for the District of Keighley to construct additional Waterworks; to confer upon them further powers with respect to Works heretofore authorised to be constructed; to make fresh Regulations with respect to Streets and Buildings; and for other purposes.
Severn Bridge Railway Act 1872	35 & 36 Vict. c. cix	18 July 1872
An Act to authorise the construction of a Railway from the South Wales Railway, in the parish of Lydney, across the River Severn, to Holly Hazle Brook, in the parish of Berkeley, with Branches; and for other purposes.
Louth and East Coast Railway Act 1872	35 & 36 Vict. c. cx	18 July 1872
An Act to authorise the Construction of the Louth and East Coast Railway.
Glasgow and South Western and Greenock and Ayrshire Railways Amalgamation Act 1872	35 & 36 Vict. c. cxi	18 July 1872
An Act for the amalgamation of the Greenock and Ayrshire Railway Company with the Glasgow and South-western Railway Company; and for other purposes.
Darlington Extension and Improvement Act 1872	35 & 36 Vict. c. cxii	18 July 1872
An Act to define and extend the powers of the Corporation and of the Local Board of Health of Darlington in relation to Gas and Water Supply, and other matters; to extend the Boundaries of the Borough; to authorise the construction of River Diversions, Bridge Improvement, Gasworks, and other Works; to amend the Acts in force within the Borough; to borrow Money; and for other purposes.
Barrow-in-Furness Corporation Extension and Amendment Act 1872	35 & 36 Vict. c. cxiii	18 July 1872
An Act for extending the boundaries of the municipal borough of Barrow-in-Furness; for making the extended borough a separate parish; for empowering the Corporation of the borough to construct new Gasworks and to make new Streets; and for other purposes.
Caledonian Railway (Additional Powers) Act 1872	35 & 36 Vict. c. cxiv	18 July 1872
An Act for enabling the Caledonian Railway Company to improve certain of their existing Lines and Stations, to make certain new Branch lines, and to raise additional Money; and for other purposes.
City of Glasgow Union Railway Act 1872	35 & 36 Vict. c. cxv	18 July 1872
An Act to confer further powers on the City of Glasgow Union Railway Company and the Glasgow and South-western Railway Company; and for other purposes.
Lancashire and Yorkshire Railway (New Works and Additional Powers) Act 1872	35 & 36 Vict. c. cxvi	18 July 1872
An Act for conferring further powers on the Lancashire and Yorkshire Railway Company.
Louth and Lincoln Railway Act 1872	35 & 36 Vict. c. cxvii	18 July 1872
An Act to enable the Louth and Lincoln Railway Company to abandon the construction of a portion of their Railway and make a Deviation or Substituted Line of Railway in lieu thereof; to revive the powers conferred upon the said Company by The Louth and Lincoln Railway Act, 1866; (Note: Louth and Lincoln Railway Act 1866 (29 & 30 Vict. c. cccxliv)) and for other purposes.
Midland Railway (Nottingham and Saxby Lines) Act 1872	35 & 36 Vict. c. cxviii	18 July 1872
An Act for enabling the Midland Railway Company to construct Railways between Nottingham and Saxby; and for other purposes.
Hereford Improvement Act 1872	35 & 36 Vict. c. cxix	18 July 1872
An Act to amend "The Hereford Improvement Act, 1854," (Note: Hereford Improvement Act 1854 (17 & 18 Vict. c. xxxi)) and "The Hereford Improvement Act, 1854 (Correction of Oversight) Act, 1855;" (Note: Hereford Improvement Act 1854 (Correction of Oversight) Act 1855 (18 & 19 Vict. c. clxxix)) and for other purposes.
Coleford Railway Act 1872	35 & 36 Vict. c. cxx	18 July 1872
An Act for authorising the construction of Railways from near Monmouth to Coleford, in the counties of Monmouth and Gloucester; and for other purposes.
Glasgow Corporation Tramways Act 1872 (repealed)	35 & 36 Vict. c. cxxi	18 July 1872
An Act to authorise the Lord Provost, Magistrates, and Council of the City of Glasgow to raise Moneys for the construction of Tramways in the city of Glasgow and its neighbourhood. (Repealed by Glasgow Corporation (Tramways Consolidation) Order Confirmation Act 1905 (5 Edw. 7. c. cxxviii))
Liverpool Tramways (Purchase) Act 1872 (repealed)	35 & 36 Vict. c. cxxii	18 July 1872
An Act to enable the Mayor, Aldermen, and Burgesses of the Borough of Liverpool to acquire certain Tramways in Liverpool; and for other purposes. (Repealed by Liverpool Corporation Act 1921 (11 & 12 Geo. 5. c. lxxiv))
North British Railway Act 1872	35 & 36 Vict. c. cxxiii	18 July 1872
An Act to confer various powers on the North British Railway Company in connexion with their Undertaking and Capital, including powers to make several Railways and Byelaws for Steam Vessels; also to authorise Agreements between the Company and the Corporation of Edinburgh; and to amalgamate the Northumberland, Central, and Leslie Railway Companies with the Company; and to provide for the Purchase of the Shares in the Coatbridge Undertaking; and for the Consolidation of certain Guaranteed and Preference Stocks; and for other purposes.
Severn and Wye Railway and Canal Act 1872	35 & 36 Vict. c. cxxiv	18 July 1872
An Act to enable the Severn and Wye Railway and Canal Company to make certain Branches from their Railway; and for other purposes with respect to the said Company.
Wallasey Improvement Act 1872	35 & 36 Vict. c. cxxv	18 July 1872
An Act for authorising the Wallasey Local Board to make and maintain Works in connexion with their Seacombe and Egremont Ferries, and to extend their Waterworks, and to raise further Moneys; and for other purposes.
Burry Port and Gwendreath Valley Railway Act 1872 (repealed)	35 & 36 Vict. c. cxxvi	18 July 1872
An Act to enable the Burry Port and Gwendreath Valley Railway Company to construct further Works at Burry Port in the Parish of Pembrey in the county of Carmarthen; and for other purposes. (Repealed by Burry Port Harbour Revision Order 2000 (SI 2000/2152))
Hoylake and Birkenhead Railway and Tramways Act 1872	35 & 36 Vict. c. cxxvii	18 July 1872
An Act for the sale and transfer of the Undertaking of the Hoylake Railway Company, and for enabling the Hoylake and Birkenhead Tramway Company to make and maintain Tramways from the Hoylake Railway to Woodside Ferry and other places in Birkenhead, in the county of Chester; and for other purposes.
Great Northern Railway (Various Powers) Act 1872	35 & 36 Vict. c. cxxviii	18 July 1872
An Act to confer further powers upon the Great Northern Railway Company.
Great Western Railway Act 1872	35 & 36 Vict. c. cxxix	18 July 1872
An Act for conferring further powers on the Great Western Railway Company in relation to their own Undertaking and the Undertakings of other Companies; and for other purposes.
Powell Duffryn Railway Act 1872	35 & 36 Vict. c. cxxx	18 July 1872
An Act for authorising the Powell Duffryn Steam Coal Company (Limited) to construct certain Railways in the parish of Aberdare in the county of Glamorgan; and for other purposes.
Tyne Improvement Act 1872	35 & 36 Vict. c. cxxxi	18 July 1872
An Act to enable the Tyne Improvement Commissioners to construct a Dock at or near the Coble Dene, with River Walls, Railways, and other Works; to consolidate, alter, and define the application of all or some of the Funds of the said Commissioners; and for other purposes.
South Devon Railway Act 1872	35 & 36 Vict. c. cxxxii	18 July 1872
An Act to empower the South Devon Railway Company to extend and improve their Sutton Harbour Branch Railway; to confer upon them further powers in relation to their own Undertaking and the Undertakings of other Companies; and for other purposes.
Truro and Perran Mineral Railway Act 1872 (repealed)	35 & 36 Vict. c. cxxxiii	18 July 1872
An Act for making a Railway from Truro to Penman in the county of Cornwall; and for other purposes. (Repealed by Truro and Perran Mineral Railway (Abandonment) Act 1875 (38 & 39 Vict. c. xlv))
Great Southern and Western Railway Act 1872	35 & 36 Vict. c. cxxxiv	25 July 1872
An Act for enabling the Great Southern and Western Railway Company to effect a Communication between their Railway and the North Wall, Dublin, and the Works of the London and North-western Railway Company at the North Wall, Dublin; and for other purposes.
Ryde and Newport Railway Act 1872	35 & 36 Vict. c. cxxxv	25 July 1872
An Act to incorporate a Company for making "The Ryde and Newport Railway;" and for other purposes.
Athenry and Tuam Railway Act 1872 (repealed)	35 & 36 Vict. c. cxxxvi	25 July 1872
An Act to enable the Athenry and Tuam Railway Company to extend their Railway to Claremorris; and for other purposes. (Repealed by Athenry and Tuam Railway (Claremorris Abandonment) Act 1877 (40 & 41 Vict. c. liii))
Temple Subway Act 1872	35 & 36 Vict. c. cxxxvii	25 July 1872
An Act to incorporate a Company for making a Subway under the River Thames, to be called "The Temple Subway."
Glasgow and Kilmarnock Joint Line and Caledonian Railway Act 1872	35 & 36 Vict. c. cxxxviii	25 July 1872
An Act for connecting the Glasgow and Kilmarnock Joint Line of Railway and the Hamilton Branch of the Caledonian Railway with the City of Glasgow Union Railway; and for other purposes.
Great Northern Railway (Derbyshire and Staffordshire) Act 1872	35 & 36 Vict. c. cxxxix	25 July 1872
An Act to enable the Great Northern Railway Company to construct Railways in Nottinghamshire and Derbyshire; and for other purposes with relation to the same Company.
Midland Railway (Additional Powers) Act 1872	35 & 36 Vict. c. cxl	25 July 1872
An Act for conferring additional powers on the Midland Railway Company for the construction of Works and for the raising of further Capital, and for other purposes in relation to their own Undertaking and the Undertakings of other Companies.
North Eastern Railway Act 1872	35 & 36 Vict. c. cxli	25 July 1872
An Act for enabling the North-eastern Railway Company to construct Railways and Works in the county of Durham, and at Hull; and for other purposes.
Sevenoaks, Maidstone, and Tunbridge Railway Act 1872	35 & 36 Vict. c. cxlii	25 July 1872
An Act for conferring further powers upon the Sevenoaks, Maidstone, and Tunbridge Railway Company, and for authorising arrangements between them and the London, Chatham, and Dover Railway Company; and for other purposes.
Sheffield Tramways Act 1872 (repealed)	35 & 36 Vict. c. cxliii	25 July 1872
An Act to authorise the construction of Tramways in the Borough and Parish of Sheffield in the West Riding of the County of York; and for other purposes. (Repealed by Sheffield Corporation (Consolidation) Act 1918 (8 & 9 Geo. 5. c. lxi))
Wallingford and Watlington Railway (Abandonment, &c.) Act 1872	35 & 36 Vict. c. cxliv	25 July 1872
An Act to enable the Wallingford and Watlington Railway Company to abandon parts of their authorised Railways, and to sell and transfer their Undertaking to the Great Western Railway Company; and for other purposes.
European Assurance Society Arbitration Act 1872	35 & 36 Vict. c. cxlv	25 July 1872
An Act to effect a settlement of the affairs of the European Assurance Society and of other Companies.
Bury Improvement Act 1872	35 & 36 Vict. c. cxlvi	25 July 1872
An Act to extend the Boundary of the Borough of Bury, and confer further powers upon the Bury Improvement Commissioners for the supply of Water, and other purposes.
Dunmanway and Skibbereen Railway Act 1872	35 & 36 Vict. c. cxlvii	25 July 1872
An Act to authorise the construction of the Dunmanway and Skibbereen Railway; and for other purposes.
Malmesbury Railway Act 1872	35 & 36 Vict. c. cxlviii	25 July 1872
An Act for making a Railway from the Great Western Railway at Dauntsey, in the county of Wilts, to Malmesbury, in the same county; and for other purposes.
Rochdale Improvement Act 1872	35 & 36 Vict. c. cxlix	25 July 1872
An Act for extending the Boundaries of the Town and Borough of Rochdale; for defining and extending the powers of the Corporation in relation to the Improvement and Management of Streets in the Borough, and to Police and other matters of Local Government, and to Gas and Water Supply, and to the Cemetery, and to Markets; and for other purposes.
Southwark Bridge Company Act 1872	35 & 36 Vict. c. cl	25 July 1872
An Act for distributing the remaining Assets and finally winding up the affairs of the Southwark Bridge Company, and dissolving the Company; and for other purposes.
Tonbridge Gas Act 1872	35 & 36 Vict. c. cli	25 July 1872
An Act incorporating and conferring further powers on the Tonbridge Gas Company.
Great Western Railway (Swansea Canal) Act 1872	35 & 36 Vict. c. clii	25 July 1872
An Act for enabling the Great Western Railway Company to construct Railways from the Swansea Branch of their Railway to the Swansea Vale Railway; for vesting in them the Undertaking of the Company of Proprietors of the Swansea Canal Navigation; and for other purposes.
South Eastern Railway Act 1872	35 & 36 Vict. c. cliii	25 July 1872
An Act to enable the South-eastern Railway Company to alter a portion of their authorised Greenwich and Woolwich Line, to construct a short Line in Southwark to connect their Cannon Street and Charing Cross Railway with the London, Chatham, and Dover Railway, to use part of the London, Chatham, and Dover Railway; and to confer various other powers upon the Company with respect to their existing and authorised Undertakings.
William Lambe's Chapel and Estate Act 1872	35 & 36 Vict. c. cliv	25 July 1872
An Act to provide for the building and endowment by the Clothworkers Company of a new Church in lieu of Lambe's Chapel, Cripplegate, for the disposal of the Site of such Chapel and of other property comprised in the Will of William Lambe, citizen and clothworker of London, deceased, and for the variation of certain charitable gifts; and for other purposes.
Gorsedda Junction and Portmadoc Railways Act 1872	35 & 36 Vict. c. clv	25 July 1872
An Act to incorporate a Company for maintaining an existing Railway from the Gorsedda Slate Quarry, in the county of Carnarvon to Portmadoc, in the same county; and for making a Railway from Blaen y Pennant, in the same county, to join the said existing Railway; and for other purposes.
Pier and Harbour Orders Confirmation Act 1872 (No. 3) or the Pier and Harbour Orders Confirmation (No. 3) Act 1872	35 & 36 Vict. c. clvi	6 August 1872
An Act to confirm a Provisional Order made by the Board of Trade under The General Pier and Harbour Act, 1861, relating to Waterford.
	Waterford Harbour Order 1872 Order for the Improvement of the Port and Harbour of Waterford.	
Tramways Orders Confirmation Act 1872 (No. 3) or the Tramways Orders Confirmation (No. 3) Act 1872	35 & 36 Vict. c. clvii	6 August 1872
An Act to confirm certain Provisional Orders made by the Board of Trade under The Tramways Act, 1870, (Note: Tramways Act 1870 (33 & 34 Vict. c. 78)) relating to Birmingham (Corporation), Southwold, and Halesworth.
	Birmingham (Corporation) Tramways Order 1872 Order authorising the Mayor, Aldermen, and Burgesses of the Borough of Birmingham, in the County of Warwick, to construct Tramways in the said Borough.	
	Southwold and Halesworth Tramways Order 1872 Order authorising the Construction of Tramways between Southwold and Halesworth, in the County of Suffolk.	
Tramways Orders Confirmation Act 1872 (No. 4) or the Tramways Orders Confirmation (No. 4) Act 1872	35 & 36 Vict. c. clviii	6 August 1872
An Act to confirm certain Provisional Orders made by the Board of Trade under the Tramways Act, 1870, relating to Bristol Corporation, Bristol and Eastern District, Hull, Leamington and Warwick, Norwich and Taverham, Southport, Stirling and Bridge of Allan, and Tynemouth.
	Bristol Corporation Tramways Order 1872 Order authorising the Mayor, Aldermen, and Burgesses of the City of Bristol to construct certain Tramways in the City and County of Bristol.	
	Bristol and Eastern District Tramways Order 1872 Order authorising the construction of Tramways in the City of Bristol and its Eastern Suburbs.	
	Hull Tramways Order 1872 Order authorising the construction of Tramways in the Borough, Town, and County of the Town of Kingston-upon-Hull.	
	Leamington and Warwick Tramways Order 1872 Order authorising the construction of Tramways in Leamington and Milverton and Warwick, in the county of Warwick.	
	East Norfolk Tramways Order 1872 Order authorising the Construction of a Tramway from the Thorpe Station of the Great Eastern Railway, in the City of Norwich, to the Paper Mills at Tavenham, with Branches, in the County of Norfolk.	
	Southport Tramways Order 1872 Order authorising the construction of Tramways in the Township of Birkdale, the Borough of Southport, and the Township of North Meols (outside the Borough of Southport), all in the Parish of North Meols and County Palatine of Lancaster.	
	Stirling and Bridge of Allan Tramways Order 1872 Order authorising the construction of Tramways in Stirling, Bridge of Allan, and places adjacent.	
	Tynemouth (Borough) Tramways Order 1872 Order authorising the construction of Tramways in the Borough of Tynemouth and its Suburbs.	
Brighton and London Sea Water Supply Act 1872	35 & 36 Vict. c. clix	6 August 1872
An Act for incorporating the Brighton and London Sea Water Company, and for authorising them to construct Works for supplying Sea Water for public and private purposes in Brighton, and in certain Districts between Brighton and London, and in the Metropolitan Districts; and for other purposes.
Alloa Harbour Consolidation Act 1872	35 & 36 Vict. c. clx	6 August 1872
An Act to regulate the Management of the Port and Harbour of Alloa, and to authorise an Extension and Improvement of the existing Dock and the formation of a new Dock at the said Harbour, and other Works; and for other purposes.
Girvan and Portpatrick Junction Railway Act 1872	35 & 36 Vict. c. clxi	6 August 1872
An Act to confer certain powers on the Girvan and Portpatrick Junction Railway Company over portions of the Portpatrick Railway; and for other purposes.
Bristol Port and Channel Dock Act 1872	35 & 36 Vict. c. clxii	6 August 1872
An Act to authorise the Bristol Port and Channel Dock Company to alter certain of their authorised Works, to divide the Shares in their Capital into Half Shares; and for other purposes.
Metropolitan Street Improvements Act 1872	35 & 36 Vict. c. clxiii	6 August 1872
An Act to enable the Metropolitan Board of Works to widen and improve certain Streets and to make certain new Streets within the Metropolis.
Ocean, Railway and General Travellers Assurance Company Limited Act 1872 or the Ocean, Railway and General Travellers Assurance Company Act 1872	35 & 36 Vict. c. clxiv	6 August 1872
An Act to confer certain powers and privileges upon "The Ocean, Railway, and General Travellers Assurance Company, Limited," for the purposes of the Assurance of Persons against Accident by Sea and Land.
Lymington Harbour and Docks (Extension of Time) Act 1872	35 & 36 Vict. c. clxv	6 August 1872
An Act to further extend the time for the purchase of Lands and for the construction of the Works authorised by "The Lymington Harbour and Docks Act, 1864." (Note: Lymington Harbour and Docks Act 1864 (27 & 28 Vict. c. cxx))
Medway Docks (Extension of Time) Act 1872	35 & 36 Vict. c. clxvi	6 August 1872
An Act to further extend the time for the purchase of Lands and for the construction of the Works authorised by The Medway Docks Act, 1866. (Note: Medway Docks Act 1866 (29 & 30 Vict. c. ccxxix))
Great Northern Railway (Newark and Melton) Act 1872	35 & 36 Vict. c. clxvii	6 August 1872
An Act to authorise the Great Northern Railway Company to construct Railways in Nottinghamshire and Leicestershire.
Newcastle-upon-Tyne District Tramways Act 1872	35 & 36 Vict. c. clxviii	6 August 1872
An Act to authorise the construction of Street Tramways in the District of Newcastle-upon-Tyne; and for other purposes.
Isle of Wight (Newport Junction) Railway Act 1872	35 & 36 Vict. c. clxix	6 August 1872
An Act to enable the Isle of Wight (Newport Junction) Railway Company to extend their Line to join the authorised Line of the Yarmouth and Ventnor Railway, Tramway, and Pier Company; to authorise the construction of certain other new Railways and Works; revival of Powers; additional Capital; and for other purposes.
Alcester Railway Act 1872	35 & 36 Vict. c. clxx	6 August 1872
An Act for making a Railway in the county of Warwick from the Bearley Station of the Stratford-upon-Avon Railway to the Alcester Station of the Evesham and Redditch Railway; and for other purposes.
Belfast Central Railway Act 1872	35 & 36 Vict. c. clxxi	6 August 1872
An Act for authorising the Belfast Central Railway Company to make new Railways; for regulating their Capital; and for conferring further powers on the Company; and other purposes.
Birmingham and Lichfield Junction Railway Act 1872 (repealed)	35 & 36 Vict. c. clxxii	6 August 1872
An Act for making a Railway from the South Staffordshire Railway at Lichfield to the Birmingham and Sutton Coldfield Branch of the London and North-western Railway at Sutton Coldfield; and for other purposes. (Repealed by Statute Law (Repeals) Act 2013 (c. 2))
Birmingham and Staffordshire Extension Tramways Act 1872	35 & 36 Vict. c. clxxiii	6 August 1872
An Act to authorise the construction of the Birmingham and Staffordshire Extension Tramways.
Leeds Tramways Act 1872 (repealed)	35 & 36 Vict. c. clxxiv	6 August 1872
An Act to incorporate the Leeds Tramways Company, and to authorise the acquisition by them of Tramways in the Borough of Leeds. (Repealed by Leeds Corporation (Consolidation) Act 1905 (5 Edw. 7. c. i))
North Wales Narrow Gauge Railways Act 1872	35 & 36 Vict. c. clxxv	6 August 1872
An Act for incorporating the North Wales Narrow Gauge Railways Company; and for other purposes.
Glencairn Railway Act 1872 (repealed)	35 & 36 Vict. c. clxxvi	6 August 1872
An Act for making a Railway from Moniaive, in the county of Dumfries, to a point near to the Auldgirth Station of the Glasgow and South-western Railway; and for other purposes. (Repealed by Glencairn Railway (Abandonment) Act 1881 (44 & 45 Vict. c. lxxix))
Continental Communication (Newhaven and Dieppe) Act 1872	35 & 36 Vict. c. clxxvii	6 August 1872
An Act for improving the Means of Communication between England and the Continent by way of Newhaven and Dieppe.
Manchester, Sheffield, and Lincolnshire Railway (Additional Powers) Act 1872	35 & 36 Vict. c. clxxviii	6 August 1872
An Act for conferring further powers on the Manchester, Sheffield, and Lincolnshire Railway Company in relation to their own Undertaking and to the Undertakings of other Companies; and for amending the Acts relating to and making further provision respecting the South Yorkshire Railway and River Dun Company, the Sheffield and Midland Railway Companies Committee, the Macclesfield, Knutsford, and Warrington Railway Company, the Macclesfield Committee, and the Oldham, Ashton-under-Lyne, and Guide Bridge Junction Railway Company; and for other purposes.
Daventry and Weedon Railway Act 1872	35 & 36 Vict. c. clxxix	6 August 1872
An Act for making a Railway from Daventry to Weedon in the county of Northampton.
Pneumatic Despatch Company Act 1872	35 & 36 Vict. c. clxxx	6 August 1872
An Act to enable the Pneumatic Despatch Company (Limited) to connect their Undertaking with the Railways in the Metropolis.
Southampton Street Tramways Act 1872	35 & 36 Vict. c. clxxxi	6 August 1872
An Act to authorise the construction Tramways in and near Southampton; and for other purposes.
Wolverhampton, Walsall, and Midland Junction Railway Act 1872	35 & 36 Vict. c. clxxxii	6 August 1872
An Act to authorise the construction of Railways between Walsall in Staffordshire and the Midland Railway in Warwickshire, to be called "The Wolverhampton, Walsall, and Midland Junction Railway."
West Lancashire Railway Act 1872	35 & 36 Vict. c. clxxxiii	6 August 1872
An Act for authorising the West Lancashire Railway Company to construct additional Lines of Railway; and for conferring further powers upon them in relation to their Undertaking; and for other purposes.
Cheltenham Gas Act 1872	35 & 36 Vict. c. clxxxiv	6 August 1872
An Act to extend the Cheltenham Gaslight and Coke Company's Limits of Supply; and to authorise them to make a short connecting Railway or Tramway between their Works and the Midland Railway; and to stop up Alstone Terrace Road; (Note: Alstone Terrace Road divided the two halves of the Cheltenham Gas Works, as a continuation of Market Street. It was stopped-up to allow the gasworks to become a single site. A supermarket car park now occupies the site. 51°54′20″N 2°05′16″W) and for other purposes.
Limerick and Castle Connell Railway (Transfer) Act 1872	35 & 36 Vict. c. clxxxv	6 August 1872
An Act to vest the Undertaking of the Limerick and Castleconnell Railway Company in the Waterford and Limerick Railway Company; and for other purposes.
General Police and Improvement (Scotland) Supplemental Act 1872	35 & 36 Vict. c. clxxxvi	10 August 1872
An Act to confirm a Provisional Order under "The General Police and Improvement (Scotland) Act, 1862," (Note: General Police and Improvement (Scotland) Act 1862 (25 & 26 Vict. c. 101)) relating to the Royal Burgh of Dumbarton.
	Dumbarton Order 1872 General Police and Improvement (Scotland) Act, 1862. (25 & 26 Vict. c. 101.) Royal Burgh of Dumbarton.	
Tivy Side Railway Act 1872	35 & 36 Vict. c. clxxxvii	10 August 1872
An Act for making a Railway from Llandyssil, in the county of Carmarthen, to Newcastle Emlyn, in the county of Cardigan, to be called the Tivy Side Railway; and for other purposes.
Midland Counties and Shannon Junction Railway Act 1872	35 & 36 Vict. c. clxxxviii	10 August 1872
An Act to revive and extend the time granted to the Midland Counties and Shannon Junction Railway Company for the purchase of Lands and execution of Works.
Barnet District Gas and Water Act 1872 (repealed)	35 & 36 Vict. c. clxxxix	10 August 1872
An Act for amalgamating the East Barnet Gas and Water Company and the Potters Bar Gas and Coke Company (Limited) and the Barnet Consumers Gas Company (Limited); and for other purposes. (Repealed by Lee Valley Water Act 1959 (7 & 8 Eliz. 2. c. li))
Metropolitan and South Western Junction Railway Act 1872	35 & 36 Vict. c. cxc	10 August 1872
An Act to authorise the construction of the Metropolitan and South-western Junction Railway.
Dundee Tramways Act 1872 (repealed)	35 & 36 Vict. c. cxci	10 August 1872
An Act to authorise the construction of Tramways in the Burgh of Dundee and places adjacent; and for other purposes. (Repealed by Dundee Corporation (Water, Transport, Finance, &c.) Order Confirmation Act 1954 (2 & 3 Eliz. 2. c. ix))
South Kensington Railway Act 1872	35 & 36 Vict. c. cxcii	10 August 1872
An Act for making a Railway from the South Kensington Railway Station to the Royal Albert Hall; and for other purposes.
Belfast Street Tramways Act 1872	35 & 36 Vict. c. cxciii	10 August 1872
An Act for authorising the construction of Tramways in the Borough of Belfast, in the county of Antrim; and for other purposes.
Aberdeen District Tramways Act 1872 (repealed)	35 & 36 Vict. c. cxciv	10 August 1872
An Act to authorise the construction of Tramways in certain parts of the City of Aberdeen and its suburbs; and for other purposes. (Repealed by Aberdeen Corporation (Water, Gas, Electricity and Transport) Order Confirmation Act 1937 (1 Edw. 8 & 1 Geo. 6. c. cii))
Teign Valley Railway Act 1872	35 & 36 Vict. c. cxcv	10 August 1872
An Act for conferring further powers upon the Teign Valley Railway Company for the construction of Works, the acquisition of Lands, the raising of Moneys, and otherwise in relation to their Undertaking; and for other purposes.
Galway, Oughterard, and Clifden Railway Act 1872	35 & 36 Vict. c. cxcvi	10 August 1872
An Act for authorising the construction of a Railway from Galway to Clifden, all in the county of Galway; and for other purposes.
London and Aylesbury Railway Act 1872	35 & 36 Vict. c. cxcvii	10 August 1872
An Act for making provision with respect to the transfer of a portion of the Undertaking of the London and Aylesbury Railway Company to the London and North-western Railway Company; and for authorising that Company to raise Moneys; and for other purposes.
Glasgow, Bothwell, Hamilton, and Wishaw Tramways Act 1872	35 & 36 Vict. c. cxcviii	10 August 1872
An Act to authorise the construction of Tramways from Glasgow to Bothwell and Hamilton, with a Branch to Motherwell and Wishaw; and for other purposes.
Accident Indemnity Company Act 1872	35 & 36 Vict. c. cxcix	10 August 1872
An Act for conferring upon the Accident Indemnity Company, Limited, further powers and privileges with respect to the Assurance of Travellers by Railway; and for other purposes.
Kingston-upon-Hull Water Act 1872 (repealed)	35 & 36 Vict. c. cc	10 August 1872
An Act for making further provision respecting the Supply of Water to the Borough of Kingston-upon-Hull; and for other purposes. (Repealed by Kingston-upon-Hull Corporation Act 1897 (60 & 61 Vict. c. ccxlix))

=== Private acts ===
Short title	Citation	Royal assent
Long title
Maclaine's Estate Act 1872	35 & 36 Vict. c. 1 Pr.	18 July 1872
An Act to apply to the Lands and Estate of Scallastle, in the Island of Mull and county of Argyll, the provisions of an Act of the Session of the 34th and 35th years of the reign of Her Majesty Queen Victoria, intituled "An Act to authorise the Sale of a part or parts of the Lands and Estates of Lochbuy and Fishnish and others, in the Island of Mull and county of Argyll, for the purpose of paying certain Debts due by the now deceased Donald Maclaine of Lochbuy, and by his Trust Estates, and of satisfying certain Provisions made by him in favour of his Children, or to charge parts of such Lands and Estates with portions of the said Debts and Provisions; and for other purposes." (Note: Donald Maclaine's Estate Act 1871 (34 & 35 Vict. c. 2 Pr.))
Daniel Mackechnie's Estate Act 1872	35 & 36 Vict. c. 2 Pr.	18 July 1872
An Act to authorise the feuing of the Lands of Kirkdales and others in the parish of Govan and county of Lanark.
Russel's Estate Act 1872	35 & 36 Vict. c. 3 Pr.	18 July 1872
An Act to authorise the Trustees of the deceased James Russel to invest part of his Trust Estate in the purchase of Lands in Scotland.
Viscount Keith's Estate Act 1872	35 & 36 Vict. c. 4 Pr.	18 July 1872
An Act to authorise the Trustees of the late George Viscount Keith to entail the Trust Estate under burden of the existing Debts; and for other purposes.
Cannington Vicarage Act 1872	35 & 36 Vict. c. 5 Pr.	6 August 1872
An Act to authorise arrangements in relation to the Vicarage of Cannington in the county of Somerset, and the endowment thereof with a portion of the Impropriate Vicarial Tithes of the said parish.
Tyssen-Amhurst Estate Act 1872	35 & 36 Vict. c. 6 Pr.	6 August 1872
An Act to extend the powers of Leasing and Purchase contained in the Marriage Settlement of William Amhurst Tyssen-Amhurst, Esquire, and to give other powers for the Improvement of the Settled Estates; and for other purposes.
Treffry's Estate Act 1872	35 & 36 Vict. c. 7 Pr.	10 August 1872
An Act for enabling the Trustees of the Will of Joseph Thomas Treffry, deceased, to carry into effect certain agreements for granting leases of Newquay Harbour, and certain railways or tramroads forming part of the estates, in the county of Cornwall, devised by the said Will; and for other purposes.
Naturalization of Edmond Wallace Act 1872 (Note: This act was not printed by the Queen's Printer.)	35 & 36 Vict. c. 8 Pr.	18 July 1872
An Act to naturalize Edmond Richard Wallace, and to grant to and confer upon him all the Rights, Privileges, and Capacities of a natural-born Subject of Her Majesty the Queen.

=== Sources ===
- The Public General Statutes passed in the Thirty-fifth & Thirty-sixth Years of the Reign of Her Majesty Queen Victoria, 1872. London: Eyre and Spottiswoode. 1872 – via Internet Archive.

== See also ==
- List of acts of the Parliament of the United Kingdom
