= English family law =

English family law concerns the law relating to family matters in England and Wales. Family law concerns a host of authorities, agencies and groups which participate in or influence the outcome of private disputes or social decisions involving family law. Such a view of family law may be regarded as assisting the understanding of the context in which the law works and to indicate the policy areas where improvements can be made.

The UK is made up of three jurisdictions: Scotland, Northern Ireland, and England and Wales. Each has quite different systems of family law and courts. This article concerns only England and Wales. Family law encompasses divorce, adoption, wardship, child abduction and parental responsibility. It can either be public law or private law. Family law cases are heard in the Family Justice System of England and Wales in both the County Court and in family proceedings courts (magistrates' court), both of which operate under codes of Family Procedure Rules. There is also a specialist division of the High Court of Justice, the Family Division which hears family law cases.

== Family relationships ==
=== Marriage and civil partnership ===
UK law recognises both marriages and civil partnerships, both of which can be entered by couples of any gender. Traditionally, marriage was only available between a man and a woman, according to decisions in cases including Hyde v Hyde and Corbett v Corbett, as well as the wording of the Matrimonial Causes Act 1973, the legislation which primarily dealt with divorce.

The Civil Partnership Act 2004 introduced the ability for couples of the same sex to obtain legal recognition. The Marriage (Same Sex Couples) Act 2013 allowed same sex couples to legally marry. The fact that same sex couples could get a marriage or a civil partnership, but opposite sex couples were precluded from civil partnerships led to a legal challenge in the UK Supreme Court—R (on the application of Steinfeld and Keidan) v Secretary of State for International Development. The inequality of treatment between opposite and same sex couples created by the introduction of civil partnerships as a stepping stone towards marriage equality was considered a breach of Articles 8 and 14 of the European Convention on Human Rights, and the court issued a declaration of incompatibility. Parliament then passed the Civil Partnerships, Marriages and Deaths (Registration etc) Act 2019 to extend civil partnerships to all.

=== Divorce and dissolution ===
The Matrimonial Causes Act 1973 was, until 2020, the legislation governing divorce (and dissolution of civil partnerships). It set out five "facts" which were necessary before a divorce (or dissolution) could be granted. These were adultery, behaviour which the petitioner could not reasonably be expected to live, desertion for over two years, separation for two years with consent, or separation for five years. An attempt to reform the divorce procedure was included as part of the Family Law Act 1996, but it did not take effect.

A legal challenge to the five facts was brought to the Supreme Court in Owens v Owens by a woman who was denied a contested divorce petition due to failure to prove one of the five facts. The court expressed considerable sympathy but found against her. Parliament reformed the procedure with the Divorce, Dissolution and Separation Act 2020.

The procedure for seeking a divorce takes the form of two parts: seeking a decree nisi, followed by a decree absolute six weeks later. The Divorce (Religious Marriages) Act 2002 allows the court to make the issuance of the decree absolute conditional on the receipt of an order of a religious authority—for example, a get issued by a Jewish beth din.

When the court has to decide on orders for the appropriate care for children following a divorce, it does so using the jurisdiction of the Children Act 1989.

- Child Support Act 1990

=== Domestic violence ===
- Family Law Act 1996
- Protection from Harassment Act 1997
- Children Act 1989

== Children ==
=== Parental responsibility ===
- Human Rights Act 1998

=== Adoption ===
- Adoption and Children Act 2002
- Children and Adoption Act 2006
- Education and Adoption Act 2016

== See also ==
- English law

=== Case law ===
Decisions of the Court of Appeal may be issued orally, in which case no report is usually made available to the public. Important or difficult decisions, however, are published on the internet both by the Court Service and by the British and Irish Legal Information Institute. The cases cited here provide examples.

- Munby judgment: F v M Re D (Intractable Contact Dispute: Publicity) [2004] EWHC 727 (Fam)
- Wall judgment: A v A (Shared Residence, 4 February 2004)
- Bracewell judgment: V v V (Change of Residence, 20 April 2004)
- Butler-Sloss: D v D (Shared Residence Order, 20 November 2000)
- Re F (2003) EWCA Civ 592, 18 March 2003. (Case of shared residency, father in Hampshire, mother moved to Edinburgh)
- Miller v Miller (Short marriage, no children, rich husband)
- Piglowska v. Piglowski (Runaway costs)
- Clayton v Clayton 2006 (An appeal against injunctions preventing a father from publishing matters concerning his daughter. The appeal was allowed, the injunction quashed and a Prohibited Steps Order imposed.)

=== Statutory Instruments ===
Statutory Instruments contain the rules that lay down court procedure. They frequently cross-reference each other, though many refer to the original 1991 rules, which came in with the Children Act 1989. The list below contains many of the Statutory Instruments that have a bearing on family law, which are available from the Office of Public Sector Information.

- The Family Proceedings Rules 1991 Statutory Instrument 1991 No. 1247 (L.20)
- The Family Proceedings Courts (Matrimonial Proceedings etc.) Rules 1991 Statutory Instrument 1991 No. 1991 (L.32)
- The Family Proceedings (Amendment) Rules 1992 Statutory Instrument 1992 No. 456 (L.1)
- "The Family Proceedings Courts (Child Support Act 1991) Rules 1993". opsi.gov.uk. Statutory Instrument 1993 No. 627 (L. 8).
- "The Family Proceedings (Amendment) (No. 3) Rules 1994 Statutory Instrument 1994 No. 2890 (L.17)". opsi.gov.uk.
- "The Family Proceedings Fees (Amendment) Order 1997". opsi.gov.uk. Statutory Instrument 1997 No. 788 (L. 18).
- "The Family Proceedings (Miscellaneous Amendments) Rules 1999". opsi.gov.uk. Statutory Instrument 1999 No. 1012 (L. 9).
- "The Family Proceedings (Amendment No. 2) Rules 1999". opsi.gov.uk. Statutory Instrument 1999 No. 3491 (L. 28).
- "The Magistrates' Courts (Transfer of Justices' Clerks' Functions) (Miscellaneous Amendments) Rules 2001". opsi.gov.uk. Statutory Instrument 2001 No. 615.
- The Family Proceedings Courts (Family Law Act 1986) Rules 2001 Statutory Instrument 2001 No. 778 (L. 14)
- The Family Proceedings (Amendment) Rules 2001 Statutory Instrument 2001 No. 821 (L. 18)
- "The Legal Aid in Family Proceedings (Remuneration) (Amendment No. 2) Regulations 2001". opsi.gov.uk. Statutory Instrument 2001 No. 1255.
- The Family Proceedings (Amendment) Rules 2003 Statutory Instrument 2003 No. 184 (L. 2)
- "The Courts Act 2003 (Consequential Amendments) Order 2004". Statutory Instrument 2004 No. 2035.
- "The Family Proceedings (Amendment No. 2) Rules 2003". opsi.gov.uk. Statutory Instrument 2003 No. 2839 (L. 35).
- The Family Proceedings Fees (Amendment) Order 2003 Statutory Instrument 2003 No. 645 (L. 12)
- "The Family Proceedings Fees (Amendment No. 2) Order 2003". opsi.gov.uk. Statutory Instrument 2003 No. 719 (L. 19).
- The Family Proceedings Fees Order 2004 Statutory Instrument 2004 No. 3114 (L. 21)
- "The Community Legal Service (Funding) (Counsel in Family Proceedings) (Amendment) Order 2005". opsi.gov.uk. Statutory Instrument 2005 No. 184.
- The Family Proceedings (Amendment) Rules 2005 Statutory Instrument 2005 No. 264
- The Data Protection (Subject Access Modification) (Social Work) (Amendment) Order 2005 Statutory Instrument 2005 No. 467
- The Family Proceedings (Amendment No. 3) Rules 2005 Statutory Instrument 2005 No. 559 (L. 11)
- The Family Proceedings (Amendment No 4) Rules 2005 Statutory Instrument 2005 No. 1976 (L. 18 )
- The Family Proceedings Courts (Miscellaneous Amendments) Rules 2005 Statutory Instrument 2005 No. 1977 (L. 19)
- The Family Procedure (Adoption) Rules 2005 Statutory Instrument 2005 No. 2795 (L. 22)
- The Family Proceedings (Civil Partnership: Staying of Proceedings) Rules 2005 Statutory Instrument 2005 No. 2921 (L. 25)
- "The Family Proceedings (Amendment) (No. 5) Rules 2005". Statutory Instrument 2005 No. 2922 (L. 26).
- "The Civil Partnership (Family Proceedings and Housing Consequential Amendments) Order 2005". opsi.gov.uk. Statutory Instrument 2005 No. 3336.
- The Family Proceedings Fees (Amendment No. 2) Order 2005 Statutory Instrument 2005 No. 3443 (L.29)
