= Civil partnership in the United Kingdom =

Form of civil union granted under the Civil Partnership Act 2004

Civil partnership in the United Kingdom is a form of civil union between couples open to both same-sex couples and opposite-sex couples. It was introduced via the Civil Partnership Act 2004 by the Labour government. The act initially permitted only same-sex couples to form civil partnerships, but the law was expanded to include different-sex couples in 2019.

== History ==
Civil partnerships were introduced for same-sex couples under the terms of the Civil Partnership Act 2004. Before this, an informal London Partnership Register had been set up in 2001 by then-Mayor of London Ken Livingstone but without any legal recognition.

In February 2018, the United Kingdom and Scottish governments began reviewing civil partnerships, potentially to expand them to include opposite-sex couples. In June 2018, the Supreme Court of the United Kingdom ruled that restricting civil partnerships to same-sex couples was incompatible with the rights guaranteed by the European Convention on Human Rights as enacted in schedule 1 to the Human Rights Act 1998. The UK Government was obliged to change the law to allow opposite-sex couples in England and Wales to enter into civil partnerships. This change was unsuccessfully opposed by the Church of England and many Christian denominations.

Opposite-sex couples have been able to enter into civil partnerships in England and Wales since 2 December 2019. Similar reforms have been in place in Northern Ireland since 13 January 2020 under the Marriage (Same-sex Couples) and Civil Partnership (Opposite-sex Couples) (Northern Ireland) Regulations 2019 (SI 2019/1514). In Scotland, legislation to allow opposite-sex civil partnerships passed the Scottish Parliament on 23 June 2020. These changes extend the legal recognition of relationships granted under the Civil Partnership Act 2004, allowing couples irrespective of sex to obtain essentially the same rights and responsibilities as civil marriage.

Civil partners are entitled to the same property rights as married couples, the same exemption as married couples on inheritance tax, social security and pension benefits, and also the ability to obtain parental responsibility for a partner's children, as well as responsibility for reasonable maintenance of one's partner and their children, tenancy rights, full life insurance recognition, next of kin rights in hospitals, and others.

When the Marriage (Same Sex Couples) Act 2013 legalised same-sex marriage in England and Wales in March 2014, civil partnerships remained available to same-sex couples and granted those couples in a civil partnership the ability to convert their civil partnership into a marriage. The equivalent Marriage and Civil Partnership (Scotland) Act 2014 does not grant that ability to couples in Scotland, but includes provisions for its later introduction, and does permit those already in civil partnership to marry without first dissolving the mutual civil partnership; it is not possible to have both. When same-sex marriage became legal in Northern Ireland on 13 January 2020, couples married elsewhere were legally recognised as married in Northern Ireland. Couples in Northern Ireland have been allowed to convert their civil partnerships into marriages since 7 December 2020.

== Law and procedure ==
A civil partnership is a relationship between two people, formed when they register as civil partners of each other, which ends only on death, dissolution or annulment. Part 2 of the Act relates to England and Wales, Part 3 to Scotland and Part 4 to Northern Ireland.

=== Formation and registration ===
A civil partnership is formed once both individuals have signed the civil partnership document in the presence of a registrar and two witnesses.

Under the standard procedure, before registration, each party will usually have to give notice to the appropriate authority. Each party must have resided in the British jurisdiction in which they intend to register (England and Wales or Northern Ireland) for at least seven days immediately preceding the giving of notice, and there will, in most cases, be a fifteen-day waiting period after notice is given.

A civil partnership in Wales (Welsh: Partneriaeth Sifil) may be conducted either in English or – provided that both registering parties, the registrar and witnesses are able to understand and write in the Welsh language – in Welsh. Civil partnership documents issued in Wales (regardless of the registering language) follow a standardised bilingual English and Welsh format.

In Scotland there is no minimum residence requirement to contract a valid partnership.

During the waiting period, the proposed partnership is publicised and anyone may make a formal objection. If there is such an objection, the proposed civil partnership cannot be formed unless the objection is withdrawn or if the registration authority is satisfied that the objection ought not to prevent the formation of the civil partnership. Provided no objection has been recorded, or any recorded objections have been cleared, the registration authority must issue a civil partnership schedule at the request of either party upon the expiration of the waiting period. The civil partnership must then be registered within twelve months of the notice first being given.

Specific registration procedures apply to certain special circumstances, e.g. concerning the housebound, detained persons and those seriously ill and in danger of death.

==== Eligibility ====
Each party to the civil partnership must be at least 16 years of age. Anyone below 18 years of age will usually need parental consent, except in Scotland where such consent is not required. Furthermore, the parties to the proposed partnership must not be within the prohibited degrees of relationship specified in part 1 of schedule 1, paragraphs 1 and 2 of the Act (paragraph 3 was not brought into force following a ruling from the European Court of Human Rights against similar provisions for marriage). Any party who is already in a marriage or a civil partnership is ineligible to register.

Where permitted, civil partnerships may be registered at British embassies or consulates-general. As of October 2009, the British Embassy in France listed 28 such places as being authorised to hold civil partnerships. For such registrations, at least one partner must be a British citizen. Overseas couples wishing to register their partnership in the UK must reside in the country for seven days prior to application for the partnership, and wait a further fifteen days before the civil partnership may be formed.

==== Later developments ====
===== Venues =====
It is prohibited for civil partnership ceremonies to include any readings, music or symbols that are religious, though the partnership can obtain a religious blessing after the ceremony. The couple may exchange vows but are not required to. It was originally prohibited for the ceremonies to take place in religious venues. On 17 February 2011, the UK government announced that, as the result of the passing of the Equality Act 2010, it would bring forward the necessary measures to remove the latter restriction in England and Wales, although religious venues would not be compelled to offer civil partnerships. This was implemented by the Marriages and Civil Partnerships (Approved Premises) (Amendment) Regulations 2011 (SI 2011/2661). The first civil partnership to be registered in a place of worship in the UK was at Ullet Road Unitarian Church in Liverpool on 6 May 2012.

===== Same-sex marriage =====
On 26 September 2011, the Home Office published the following statement on its website:

A public consultation to consider how to make civil marriage available to same-sex couples will begin in March 2012, the government announced today.

As part of its commitment to advancing equality for lesbian, gay, bisexual and transgender individuals the government announced in February this year its intention to look at how legislation could develop on equal civil marriage. Minister for Equalities Lynne Featherstone said:

"I am delighted to confirm that early next year, this government will begin a formal consultation on equal civil marriage for same-sex couples. This would allow us to make any legislative changes before the end of this Parliament. We will be working closely with all those who have an interest in the area to understand their views ahead of the formal consultation."

The consultation will only cover civil marriage for same sex couples – not religious marriage.

It falls within the respective jurisdictions of the Scottish Parliament and Northern Ireland Assembly to decide whether or not to remove the restrictions in the areas of civil partnerships and marriage. From September to December 2011, the Scottish Government held a consultation on not only removing religious prohibitions for civil partnerships but also legalising same-sex marriage within that country. In the foreword to the consultation document, Deputy First Minister, Nicola Sturgeon stated

"The Scottish Government is choosing to make its initial views clear at the outset of this consultation. We tend towards the view that religious ceremonies for civil partnerships should no longer be prohibited and that same sex marriage should be introduced so that same sex couples have the option of getting married if that is how they wish to demonstrate their commitment to each other. We also believe that no religious body or its celebrants should be required to carry out same sex marriages or civil partnership ceremonies."

Unlike the English and Welsh Consultation due to begin in March 2012, the Consultation for Scotland dealt with the issue of same-sex marriage in a religious context. On 10 December 2011, The Scotsman newspaper reported that some 50,000 responses had been received and that a government spokesperson stated that an analysis would be published in the spring of 2012. Despite the legalisation of same-sex marriage by the Scottish Parliament in February 2014, the Government of Scotland has yet to decide whether or not to open civil partnerships to opposite-sex couples. Other aspects of Scotland's Marriage and Civil Partnership Act which legalised same-sex marriage in Scotland and relate to civil partnership include:

- Possible tests for religious and belief bodies to meet when solemnising marriages or registering civil partnerships, in light of increasing concerns over sham and forced marriages
- Introducing religious and belief ceremonies to register civil partnerships

==== Changes of gender ====
The Gender Recognition Act 2004 allows transgender people to obtain legal recognition for their 'acquired gender' allowing individuals to obtain a change in sex on birth certificates. Under special provisions of the Civil Partnership Act 2004, in such situations a couple may dissolve their marriage and enter into a civil partnership the same day, and under the provision of the Civil Partnerships, Marriages and Deaths (Registration etc) Act 2019 a same-sex marriage can be converted to an opposite-sex civil partnership. Alternatively they can stay married or in a civil partnership if their spouse signs a statutory declaration that they agree to the gender change changing the opposite sex marriage into a same sex marriage or vice versa.

==== Overseas relationships ====
Where a same-sex couple has registered an overseas relationship which is specified in Schedule 20 of the Civil Partnership Act 2004, or meet certain general conditions, they are treated as having formed a civil partnership. The requirements can be found in section 212 and sections 215 to 218 of the act.

For an overseas relationship to meet the general conditions it must, under the law of the country or territory in which it was formed:

- be exclusive in nature (i.e., the law must not permit a person to be in a civil or marital relationship with more than one person);
- be indeterminate in duration (this would exclude an arrangement whereby the parties agreed to live together for a fixed period of time); and
- result in the parties being treated as a couple (thus excluding local registers which have no legal effects under state/provincial or national law).

=== Legal effect ===
==== Property and financial arrangements ====
The position of civil partners in relation to financial arrangements mirrors that of spouses. For instance, Section 11 of the Married Women's Property Act 1882 applies to civil partnerships; thus, money payable to a surviving partner under a policy of life assurance no longer forms part of the deceased partner's estate.

The laws governing wills, administration of estates and family provisions also apply to civil partners as to spouses; thus, provisions governing financial relief under Part 2 of the Matrimonial Causes Act 1973 (MCA) and the Domestic Proceedings and Magistrates' Court Act 1978 also apply to civil partnerships. Tax exemptions available to spouses under s.18 of the Inheritance Tax Act 1984 are available to civil partners under the Civil Partnership Act 2004. In Scotland the centuries-old system of minimum legal rights to a deceased estate for a widowed spouse were expressly extended to civil partners by section 131 of act.

In any dispute between civil partners as to title or possession of property, either partner may apply to a court, which can then make any order in relation to the property, including an order to sell such property. Contributions by either partner to property improvement are recognised if the contributions are substantial and in actual money or money's worth.

==== Children ====
When dealing with an application for dissolution, nullity or separation where there is a child in the family, a court must consider if it should exercise its powers under the Children Act 1989. Section 75 amends the definition of 'a child of the family' accordingly.

Other amendments were also made to equalise the position of civil partners with that of spouses. Civil partners are able to acquire parental responsibilities as a stepparent under Section 75 of the act. They may also apply for residence or contact orders. Further, the right to apply for financial provision for children under schedule 1 of the 1989 act was extended to civil partners. Adoption provisions were amended to treat civil partners the same as married couples in Britain, although this does not apply to Northern Ireland at 18 November 2011. The Northern Ireland Adoption law was due to go to a judicial review in December 2011.

==== Other provisions ====
The act also amended other areas to equalise the position of civil partners. Such areas included matters relating to housing, tenancies and the Fatal Accidents Act 1976. Applicable parts of the Family Law Act 1996 were also amended.

==== Name changing ====
There is no requirement that either party must change their surname upon entering a civil partnership. However, many couples wish to follow marital traditions and seek to change their surname to that of either partner, or combine their names to make a double-barrelled surname. This change can be made after the civil partnership is registered, and authorities will accept a certificate of civil partnership as evidence of name change, e.g. when applying for a passport or a driving licence. In Scotland, names need not be changed to be considered valid (deeds poll do not exist under Scots law), though some English-based companies may still ask for proof from an official such as a justice of the peace. Civil partners of male peers or knights do not receive a courtesy title to which the spouse of a peer or knight would be entitled.

=== Ending the partnership ===
Section 37(1) of the Act provides for the making of dissolution, nullity, separation and presumption of death orders. These provisions broadly mirror those governing marriage.

==== Dissolution ====
No applications for dissolution may be made within one year of the formation of the civil partnership, except in Scotland. Like marriage, irretrievable breakdown is the only ground on which the court may make a dissolution order. Also, Section 44 provides that the court may not make such an order unless the applicant satisfies as to certain facts which are the same as those for divorce under the Matrimonial Causes Act 1973 (MCA), except that adultery cannot be relied on for a civil partnership dissolution: the respondent's behaviour, two years' separation and consent, two years' desertion or five years' separation. If the applicant satisfies the court in this respect, the court must make a dissolution order unless it is not convinced by the evidence that the partnership has indeed broken down irretrievably. The MCA section 5 defence is also available. While adultery cannot be cited as a reason in itself for dissolving a civil partnership, it could be cited as an example of unreasonable behaviour.

As with the breakdown of a marriage, the court will have powers to provide financial relief upon dissolution of a civil partnership. The court may make Maintenance and lump sum orders, Orders for Sale, Pension Sharing Orders or Property Adjustment Orders.

==== Nullity, separation and presumption of death orders ====
A nullity order is one which annuls a void or voidable civil partnership. Section 49 of the Act provides that a civil partnership is void on grounds of ineligibility to register, if the parties: disregarded certain requirements as to the formation of the partnership, where any party is a minor, where any person whose consent is required (e.g. a parent) has forbidden the formation of the partnership and the court has not given its consent. Where a civil partnership is voidable, applications for nullity orders are subject to the bars of time, knowledge of defect and approbation.

A presumption of death order dissolves the partnership on the grounds that one of the partners is presumed to be dead, while a separation order provides for the separation of the parties. These orders are governed by Sections 55 and 56 of the Act and they largely mirror the position for married couples.

== Differences from marriage ==
The contracts of marriage and civil partnerships are very similar though there are some technical differences: venereal disease is a ground for annulment of marriage, but not civil partnership; adultery is a ground for divorce, but not dissolution of civil union; and titles may not be inherited or passed to partners of a civil partnership. Where laws differ for wife and husband, both partners are generally treated like opposite-sex couples. Otherwise, the rules for pensions, survivor benefits, annulment and dissolution are very similar.

== The first same-sex civil partnerships ==
The first civil partnership formed under the Civil Partnership Act 2004 took place at 11:00 GMT on 5 December 2005 between Matthew Roche and Christopher Cramp at St Barnabas Hospice, Worthing, West Sussex. The statutory 15-day waiting period was waived as Roche was suffering from a terminal illness: he died the following day. The first partnership registered after the normal waiting period was held in Belfast on 19 December 2005.

The first partnerships formed in Great Britain, after the waiting period, should have occurred on 21 December, but due to a misinterpretation of the rules, the first in Scotland were held on 20 December. The first civil partnerships in England and Wales were formed on 21 December 2005, with Westminster, Hampshire, The Royal Borough of Kensington and Chelsea, Hammersmith and Fulham and Brighton & Hove conducting the largest numbers.

== Responses from churches ==
Civil partnerships were introduced to allow same-sex couples almost identical advantages to marriage without using the word, and were designed to sidestep opposition from Christian churches, especially the Church of England and Catholic Church, which regarded the initiative as undermining conventional marriage.

On 17 February 2011, the UK Government announced its intention to remove the legal barrier to civil partnerships being registered on religious premises by implementing section 202 of the Equality Act 2010, and ran a consultation on this proposal from 31 March to 23 June 2011, and published a summary of its findings on 4 November 2011. The Marriages and Civil Partnerships (Approved Premises) (Amendment) Regulations 2011 (SI 2011/2661)came into force in December 2011. This voluntary provision allowed religious organisations that wish to do so to host civil partnership registrations on their religious premises. Faith groups which have applied to have their premises approved for the registration of civil partnerships include the Society of Friends (Quakers), Spiritualists, Unitarians, and United Reformed Church. The first civil partnership to be registered in a place of worship in the UK was at Ullet Road Unitarian Church, Liverpool, on 6 May 2012.

=== Church of England ===
As the established church in England, the Church of England has discussed and established guidelines for clergy entering into civil partnerships. Within the guidelines, "The House of Bishops does not regard entering into a civil partnership as intrinsically incompatible with holy orders, provided the person concerned is willing to give assurances to his or her bishop that the relationship is consistent with the standards for the clergy...The House of Bishops considers it would be a matter of social injustice to exclude from ministry those who are faithful to the teaching of the Church, and who decide to register a civil partnership."

In 2010, the General Synod extended pension and employee rights to clergy who have entered in a same-sex civil partnership. In 2013, the church ruled that priests in civil partnerships could become bishops. The church wrote in 2014 that "The Church of England recognises that same-sex relationships often embody fidelity and mutuality. Civil partnerships enable these Christian virtues to be recognised socially and legally in a proper framework."

The Church of England Archbishops' Council confirmed in 2016 that:

- Clergy may enter into a civil partnership as this does not conflict with the church's doctrine on marriage
- Clergy may offer "prayers of support" on behalf of same-sex couples following a civil partnership or civil marriage.

In 2018, the Church said "We believe that Civil Partnerships still have a place, including for some Christian LGBTI [lesbian, gay, bisexual, transgender and intersex] couples who see them as a way of gaining legal recognition of their relationship."

In December 2023, the Church authorised blessings for same-sex couples following a civil partnership or marriage during ordinary church services, and the first blessings for same-sex couples in a civil partnership, or civil marriage, took place on 17 December 2023. Informal prayers may also be said with couples: as the chancellor of the Diocese of London explained, "There is no prohibition on prayers' being said in church or there being a 'service'". In July 2024, the General Synod of the Church of England voted to support "stand-alone" services of blessing for same-sex couples after a civil partnership or marriage.

== Statistics ==
18,059 couples entered into a civil partnership between December 2005 and the end of December 2006, with a further 8,728 taking place in 2007, 7,169 in 2008, 6,281 in 2009, 6,385 in 2010, and 6,795 in 2011.

The end of 2011 also saw a total of 53,417 civil partnerships between 106,834 people, meaning estimates by the 2004 Labour government of between 11,000 and 22,000 people entering partnerships by 2010 were less than a fifth of the actual amount. 25.5% of civil partnerships in the UK were granted in London, followed by Brighton and Hove. The average age for a civil partnership was 40 for men and 38 for women in 2011.

By 2009, 487 couples in 20 countries were registered at British consulates. Six of these countries have since legislated for same-sex marriage, civil partnerships or something similar. British embassies in a further nine countries are licensed to conduct British civil partnerships but had yet to perform their first.

In 2020, 7,566 opposite-sex civil partnerships were formed in England and Wales, of which 7,208 were registered in England and 358 in Wales. This is the first year in which statistics on opposite-sex civil partnerships were gathered. In comparison, 785 civil partnerships formed between same-sex couples in England and Wales in 2020, of which 745 were registered in England and 40 in Wales; 2020 saw the lowest number of same-sex civil partnerships recorded since 2005.

Civil partnership formations by year in England, Wales, Scotland and Northern Ireland
Year	Same-sex in E&W	Opposite-sex in E&W	Same-sex in Scotland	Opposite-sex in Scotland	Same-sex in NI	Opposite-sex in NI
2005	1,857		84		12	
2006	14,943		1,047		116	
2007	7,929		688		111	
2008	6,558		525		86	
2009	5,687		498		96	
2010	5,804		465		116	
2011	6,152		554		89	
2012	6,362		574		101	
2013	5,646		530		100	
2014	1,683		436		110	
2015	861		64		89	
2016	890		70		84	
2017	908		70		92	
2018	956		65		108	
2019	994	171	83		103	
2020	785	7,566	72		14	29
2021	1,039	5,692	88	411	9	28
2022	1,119	5,760	101	529	13	30
2023	1,368	6,179	129	590	10	29
2024	TBA	TBA	135	661	4	48

== In the Crown dependencies and British overseas territories ==
Most of the overseas territories have not indicated plans to introduce civil partnerships. The British Crown dependency of Jersey has civil partnerships available, but only for same sex couples; a law to allow for opposite-sex civil partnerships was passed by the States Assembly on 3 March 2022 and, following approval by the Privy Council, will take effect by the end of 2022. Both opposite-sex couples and same-sex couples within the Falkland Islands, Isle of Man and Gibraltar have civil marriage and civil partnerships available as of 2016.

Civil partnerships are legal within the Cayman Islands following enactment of the Civil Partnership Law on 4 September 2020.

== Civil partnerships for opposite-sex couples ==
After the establishment of civil partnerships, several individuals and groups advocated extension to opposite-sex couples. In October 2014, the campaign group Equal Civil Partnerships was founded by Charles Keidan and Rebecca Steinfeld, an opposite-sex couple who had attempted to register for a civil partnership and been refused. They sued for recognition of their relationship as a civil partnership, but were unsuccessful in the High Court on 29 January 2016 and again in the Court of Appeal on 21 February 2017. The Civil Partnership Act 2004 (Amendment) Bill 2016–17, a private member's bill, was filed by Conservative MP Tim Loughton on 21 July 2016 to amend the Civil Partnership Act 2004 and extend civil partnerships to opposite-sex couples, but after the second reading debate took place on 13 January 2017, further debate was postponed and eventually cancelled due to the calling of a general election in June 2017.

By July 2016, the Isle of Man was the only part of the British Isles where both same- and opposite-sex couples could choose between civil partnership and marriage. The Isle made this possible at the same time as the legalisation of same-sex marriage in the territory.

In June 2018, the Supreme Court ruled in the Steinfeld-Keidan case that restricting civil partnerships to same-sex couples was discriminatory and mandated that the Government change the law, though did not set a timeline for doing so. In response, prime minister Theresa May announced in October 2018 that civil partnerships would be opened to heterosexual couples.

On 19 July 2017, a bill titled Civil Partnerships, Marriages and Deaths (Registration etc) – requiring the Secretary of State to issue regulations amending the Civil Partnership Act 2004 so that opposite-sex couples could enter into civil partnerships – was introduced by Tim Loughton, again as a private member's bill through the ballot of private members. The bill received royal assent on 26 March 2019 and came into effect on the same day. Section 2 of the act required the Secretary of State to amend the Civil Partnership Act 2004 by 31 December 2019, so that people of the opposite sex could enter into civil partnerships. The regulations came into effect on 2 December 2019, the first date upon which opposite-sex couples could register their intent to form a civil partnership. This expansion of civil partnerships to opposite-sex couples applied only in England and Wales, and not Scotland or Northern Ireland.

Steinfeld and Keidan became one of the first mixed-sex civil partners in the UK on 31 December 2019, with a ceremony at Kensington and Chelsea Register Office. Altogether, 167 opposite-sex couples entered into civil partnerships on the same day in England and Wales.

=== Northern Ireland and Scotland ===
Civil partnerships became available to opposite-sex couples in Northern Ireland on 13 January 2020. This change came at the same time as the UK Government issued regulations extending same-sex marriage to Northern Ireland. The Scottish Government introduced legislation allowing opposite-sex civil partnerships to the Scottish Parliament on 30 September 2019, and the bill passed by a vote of 64–0 on 23 June 2020. It received royal assent on 28 July 2020 and has been in effect since 1 June 2021.

== See also ==
- Legal consequences of marriage and civil partnership in England and Wales
- Same-sex marriage in the Isle of Man
- Same-sex marriage in Jersey
- Same-sex marriage in Guernsey
- Same-sex marriage in the Falkland Islands
- Same-sex marriage in Gibraltar
- Same-sex marriage in the United Kingdom
- LGBTQ rights in the United Kingdom
- Same-sex unions and military policy § United Kingdom
- Vivien Mitchell, field hockey player, half of Scotland's first civil partnership
