= White v White =

UK legal case

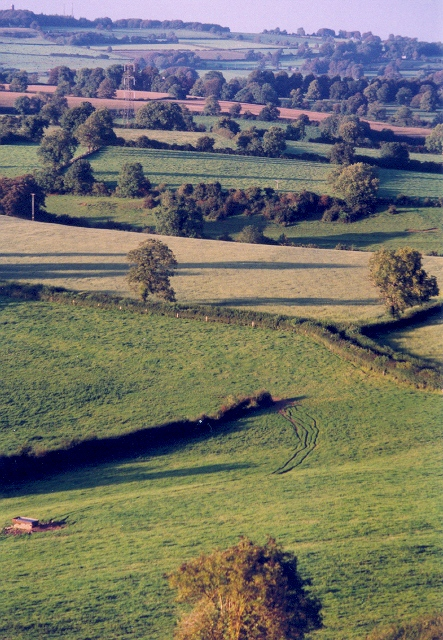
- Two dairy farms in Somerset were involved in the matter.
- Court: Judicial Committee of the House of Lords
- Decided: 26 October 2000
- Citations: [2000] UKHL 54 [2001] 1 AC 596 [2001] 1 All ER 1 [2001] Fam Law 12 [2000] 2 FLR 981 [2000] 3 FCR 555 [2000] 3 WLR 1571
- Cases cited: Burgess v Burgess [1996] Calderbank v Calderbank [1976] Fitzpatrick v Sterling Housing Association Ltd [2001]
- Legislation cited: Matrimonial Causes Act 1973, Family Law Act 1975

Case history
- Prior actions: Appellants appealed and cross-appealed from the slightly uneven split in the Court of Appeal, based on husband's recent conversion from a quarter interest to 100% in a nearby farm owned with his brothers.
- Subsequent action: None

Case opinions
- Decision by: Lord Nicholls of Birkenhead; Lord Cooke of Thorndon; Lord Hutton
- Concurrence: Lord Hoffmann; Lord Hope

Keywords
- Divorce; Financial provision; Matrimonial property; Partnerships

White v White is an English family law decision by the House of Lords, and a landmark case in redistribution of finances as well as property on divorce. This case involved a couple with assets exceeding £4.5m which was deemed more than either needs for their reasonable requirements. It was held that the absence of financial need did not mean departing from a more generous settlement for an applicant in big money cases. This, therefore, enables the courts to make settlements reflecting the wealth of the parties, and not just their needs and requirements.

It is clear from Lord Nicholls' leading speech that he intended much of what he said to apply to all matrimonial financial proceedings, not just big money ones. He said that in all cases, regardless of division of assets, a judge would always be well advised to check his tentative views (on distribution of assets) against the "yardstick of equality of division". This was not to introduce a presumption of equality in all cases, but "to ensure the absence of discrimination", for instance, between a wage earner, and a child-carer, thereby recognising the non-financial contribution of the parent caring for children.

== Facts ==
White v White [2001] in the court of final appeal was a divorce (ancillary relief) case with regard to the court's wide discretion of lump sum award between Martin White and Pamela White who are both farmers and married in 1961. They were independent farmers prior to marriage and continued farming in equal partnership thereafter. Their farming business at Blagroves Farm was a tremendous success and they purchased more assets, including Rexton Farm, which were held by the two of them jointly.

Following the breakdown of their marriage, the wife petitioned for divorce in 1994 and was advised to apply for ancillary relief. The judge found that the net assets were £4.6m, of which £1.5m belonged to the wife. In fact, all the assets were jointly owned. The simplest solution, as proposed by the wife, would have been to share the assets to enable them to continue to farm but as sole traders not in partnership. The judge did not find this acceptable: he ordered the wife to sign away her property rights. The judge then capitalized the wife's income needs and assessed the cost of buying a home for her, awarded her a lump sum of £800,000 on a clean break basis, leaving the farms and business with the husband.

The wife's legal instructions were to appeal to restore her position and share the two farms. Her instructions were reversed by counsel who preferred to contend inter alia, that the judge had failed to give sufficient weight to the duration, extent, diversity and value of her contribution to the partnership and to recognize that her contributions were the dominant factor in the balancing act required by section 25 of the Matrimonial Causes Act 1973, and that an award of approximately 40% of the total available net assets unfair and plainly wrong.

== Judgement ==
=== Court of Appeal ===
The Court of Appeal held, allowing her appeal, that an approach based on the wife's future needs or reasonable requirements was inappropriate and that, having regard to all the circumstances of the case in accordance with section 25 of the 1973 Act as substituted, she was entitled to a lump sum of £1.5m reflecting her contribution both to the business and to the family. All consecutive appeals and cross appeals made by the husband and wife hereafter were dismissed.

=== House of Lords ===
A clean break is an arrangement whereby the wife abandoned her right to claim monetary maintenance in return for a transfer by the husband of a capital asset, usually but not always, the matrimonial home, thus encouraging the parties to the marriage to put the past behind them. However, in the case of Minton v Minton 1979, Lord Scarman's definition of a 'clean break' is such as "to begin a new life which is not overshadowed by the relationship which has broken down." It is usually not possible to come to terms with clean break on divorce when there are children under the age of 18. Much of the legislation's and statutes of this case involves the Matrimonial Causes Act 1973 especially the interpretation of section 23, 24, and 25.

The Matrimonial Causes Act 1973 section 23 & 24 empower the court to make financial and property (assets) provision orders when a decree of divorce is granted. Financial provision orders under section 23 include that one party to the marriage shall make payment to the other party, and the payments may be in secured (securities, bonds, shares) or unsecured, or in lump sums. Section 24 empowers the court to order the sale of property for the purpose of ancillary relief.

== Significance ==
According to a 2012 Law Commission consultation report on marital property agreements, this case led to a perception of English law as being more generous than other jurisdictions when it came to divorce. With several high-profile divorces involving record-setting settlements that followed, London (where many such cases are heard) earned a reputation as the "Divorce Capital of the World".
