= Divorce in England and Wales =

Total number of divorces in England and Wales over time

In England and Wales, divorce is allowed under the Divorce, Dissolution and Separation Act 2020 on the ground that the marriage has irretrievably broken down without having to prove fault or separation.

Civil remarriage is allowed. Religions and denominations differ on whether they permit religious remarriage.

A divorce in England and Wales is only possible for marriages of more than one year and when the marriage has irretrievably broken down. Following reform in 2022, it is no longer possible to defend a divorce. A decree of divorce is initially granted conditionally, before it is made final after a period of at least six weeks.

== History ==
Historically, divorce proceedings were not conducted by the barristers who practised in the common law courts but by the "advocates" and "proctors" who practised civil law from Doctors' Commons, adding to the obscurity of the proceedings. Divorce was de facto restricted to the very wealthy as it demanded either a complex annulment process or a private bill leading to an Act of Parliament, with great costs for either. The latter entailed sometimes lengthy debates about a couple's intimate marital relationship in public in the House of Commons.

The Matrimonial Causes Act 1857 moved litigation from the jurisdiction of the ecclesiastical courts to the civil courts, establishing a model of marriage based on contract rather than sacrament and widening the availability of divorce beyond those who could afford to bring proceedings for annulment or to promote a private Bill.

After World War I, there were reforms made to the divorce law that put men and women on a more equal footing. The Matrimonial Causes Act 1923 made adultery a ground of divorce for either spouse. Previously, only the man had been able to do this; women had to prove additional fault. A further Act in 1937 (the Matrimonial Causes Act 1937) offered additional grounds for divorce: cruelty, desertion and incurable insanity. The need for the reforms was illustrated in the best-selling satirical novel Holy Deadlock (1934).

Regarding the public's reaction to the end of the relationship between never-married Princess Margaret and the divorced Peter Townsend in 1955, The Independent wrote in 1995, "(this) can now be seen to have constituted a watershed in the nation's attitude towards divorce".

The Divorce Reform Act 1969 marked a significant change in that people could end marriages that had "irretrievably broken down" without having to prove fault. They could end marriages after separation of two years, if both parties desired divorce, or five years if only one party desired divorce.

The Matrimonial Causes Act 1973 provided that a marriage had to have lasted for three years before a divorce could be applied for; the Matrimonial and Family Proceedings Act 1984 reduced this period to one year.

The Divorce, Dissolution and Separation Bill 2019-21 was introduced to Parliament in January 2020 by the Conservative government. The bill was a response to the Supreme Court case of Owens v Owens, which stated in its conclusion that Parliament may wish to consider replacing the current divorce law. The bill sought to remove the requirement to provide evidence of fault, or separation, and replace it with a statement from either applicant that the marriage had irretrievably broken down. The legislation received royal assent on 25 June 2020 and was passed as the Divorce, Dissolution and Separation Act 2020.

== Laws ==
Relevant laws are:

- Marriage Act 1949
- Divorce Reform Act 1969
- Matrimonial Causes Act 1973, which sets out the basis for divorce (part i) and how the courts deal with financial issues, known as ancillary relief (part ii)
  - Cruelty has been made irrelevant. See Gollins v Gollins [1964] A.C. 644
- Children Act 1989
- Family Proceedings Courts (Matrimonial Proceedings etc.) Rules 1991
- Marriage Act 1994
- Family Law Act 1996
- Gender Recognition Act 2004
- Civil Partnership Act 2004
- Marriage (Same-Sex Couples) Act 2013
- Divorce, Dissolution and Separation Act 2020

== The ground for divorce ==
There is now only one 'ground' for divorce under English law: that the marriage has irretrievably broken down. In force from 6 April 2022, the Divorce, Dissolution and Separation Act 2020 provides for no-fault divorce. An application for divorce is made by way of the making of a statement by a sole or joint applicant(s), that the marriage has broken down irretrievably, without needing to cite any specific reasons. The marriage must have taken place at least one year before any application is made.

Before the change in April 2022, there were five 'facts' that may have constituted grounds to show why a marriage had irretrievably broken down. They were:

1. Adultery
  - respondents admitting to adultery were not to be penalised financially or otherwise.
  - could not be used as a ground for divorce if the couple kept living together for more than six months after discovering the adulterous act, unless the adulterous relationship was continuing or there were other acts of adultery after the first such act was discovered.
2. Unreasonable behaviour (most common ground for divorce before no-fault divorce).
  - the petition had to contain a series of allegations proving that the respondent behaved in such a way that the petitioner could not reasonably be expected to live with him/her.
  - the allegations had to be of a serious nature (e.g. abuse or excessive drinking) but could also be mild such as having no common interests or pursuing a separate social life; the courts could not insist on severe allegations as they adopted a realistic attitude: if one party felt so strongly that a behaviour was "unreasonable" as to issue a divorce petition, it was clear that the marriage had irretrievably broken down and it would have been futile to try to prevent the divorce.
3. Two years separation (if both parties consented)
  - both parties needed to consent
  - the parties must have lived separate lives for at least two years prior to the presentation of the petition
  - this could occur if the parties lived in the same household, but the petitioner would have needed to make clear in the petition such matters as they ate separately, etc.
4. Two years desertion
5. Five years separation (if only one party consented)

== Statistics ==
Statistics on divorce

Divorces in England and Wales from 1858 to 2020

Opposite sex divorce rates over time

Divorce rates by age group for men

Divorce rates by age group for women

Median age at divorce

Culmulative percentage of marriages ending in divorce by year of marriage

Median length of marriage before divorce

== See also ==
- Divorce in Scotland
- No-fault divorce
