= Legal responses to agunah =

Legal responses to agunah are civil legal remedies against a spouse who refuses to cooperate in the process of granting or receiving a Jewish legal divorce or "get".

== Agunah ==
For a divorce to be effective under Jewish law, a man must grant his wife a Jewish divorce—a get—of his own free will. Sometimes a Jewish woman can be held in a so-called "limping marriage" when her husband refuses co-operation in the religious form of divorce. She may have received a civil divorce but cannot remarry within her religion, meaning that for all intents and purposes, she may not be able to remarry at all—a phenomenon known as agunah. Where one party has the power to grant or withhold a religious divorce, that power can be used as a bargaining tool to pressure the other party to agree more favourable divorce terms. A parallel problem—sometimes called "male agunah"—can arise when the wife refuses to respond to the husband's attempts to initiate the get process, such as refusing to appear before a rabbinical tribunal for the proceeding. Although the consequences are not as serious for the man, the result can still be a form of extortion to agree to agree to the other party's demands.

== By location ==
=== Canada ===
Since 1990 Canada's Divorce Act permits the Court hearing the divorce to strike out the application, pleadings and/or affidavit evidence of a party creating a barrier to the religious remarriage of their spouse.

In Bruker v. Marcovitz, the Supreme Court of Canada ruled that, in the Province of Quebec, a condition of a contract between two spouses that required the husband to give his wife a get was enforceable. The court overturned a decision from the Court of Appeal of Quebec which held that as the substance of the obligation was religious in nature, the obligation was a moral one and was therefore unenforceable by the courts. The Supreme Court's decision, written by Justice Rosalie Abella, restored the trial decision of Mass J., who had ordered a total of $47,500 in damages: $2,500 for each of the 15 years that the husband had refused to grant the get, and $10,000 for Ms. Bruker’s inability to have children considered “legitimate” under Jewish law.

=== New York ===
In New York, a court cannot enter a judgment of annulment or divorce unless any barriers to religious remarriage by a spouse, the removal of which are within the control of the other spouse, have been removed. Section 253 of the Domestic Relations Law (the so-called "First New York Get Law") provides that, in a contested divorce, any applicant whose marriage was solemnised by a religious celebrant must file a statement that:

he or she has taken, or will take, all steps within his or her power to remove all barriers to the other spouse’s remarriage; or

the other spouse has waived in writing the applicant’s obligation to file the statement.

In an uncontested divorce both parties must file such a statement or waive the obligation of the other party to do so. The court cannot enter a final judgment of divorce or annulment unless it receives the statements and, even then, final judgment cannot be entered if the person who solemnised the marriage swears that, to his or her knowledge, the applicant has failed to take all steps within his or her power to remove all barriers to the other party’s religious remarriage.

=== Australia ===
In Australia, the Family Court in Gwiazda v Gwiazda ordered a reluctant wife to appear before the Beth Din in Melbourne. Emery J. observed that:

If I correctly understand the intention of the Act, then it is the clear duty of a judge of this court to ensure that appropriate orders are made fully effective, not only in theory but in fact. In this case the husband as a matter of law can marry any woman who is free to marry, subject only to the prohibitions in the Marriage Act, but as a matter of fact and practicability he cannot do so."

So-called "Gwiazda Orders" are now occasionally used when necessary to produce a fair result by requiring the parties to refer their problems to the local Beth Din. The Australian Law Commission has proposed that the decree nisi should not become absolute and, in any other proceedings except those relating to a child, the court should have the power to adjourn the proceedings.

=== United Kingdom (England and Wales) ===
Within the United Kingdom, in England and Wales, the Divorce (Religious Marriages) Act 2002, relates to Jewish divorce. The Act allows a Court discretionary right to award any damages under Tort remedies, impose any civil or criminal fines or other penalties, or to grant any further relief, and withhold the final legal civil dissolution of a marriage of Jews or of other person by means of granting the decree absolute until a declaration made by both parties that they have taken such steps as are required to dissolve the marriage in accordance with rabbinical law.

In case law, there have been a number of cases regarding the provision of a get: in the case of O v O, the wife petitioned for a civil divorce and was granted a decree nisi. As she had not been granted a get, she did not apply for a decree absolute. The husband attempted to apply for it under s9(2) of the Matrimonial Causes Act 1973, but was denied until the get had been granted.

=== South Africa ===
Section 5A of the Divorce Act, 1979 provides that the court may refuse a divorce decree if one spouse does not take steps necessary to dissolve the marriage (or to allow the other spouse to remarry) in accordance with religious custom. The court may also make any other order which it finds to be just. This provision was added in 1996 as a result of the South African Law Reform Commission's report on Jewish divorce.

== Clauses at marriage ==
The Lieberman clause, developed by Rabbi Saul Lieberman, does not deal with secular law, but instead inserts, at the time of marriage, a halakhic stipulation that the marriage is only valid on the condition that the man gives a get within 6 months of any secular court's divorce. Were the man to refuse to give a get, the marriage would be declared null retroactively—it would be as if the couple were never married from a Jewish legal perspective.

== See also ==
- Divorce (Religious Marriages) Act 2002
