= Divorce in the United Kingdom =

Due to variances in divorce law around the United Kingdom, the topic is broken down into multiple articles which are catalogued below:

- Divorce in England and Wales
- Divorce in Scotland
- Divorce in Northern Ireland
