= Ahkter v Khan =

2020 English Court of Appeal family law case

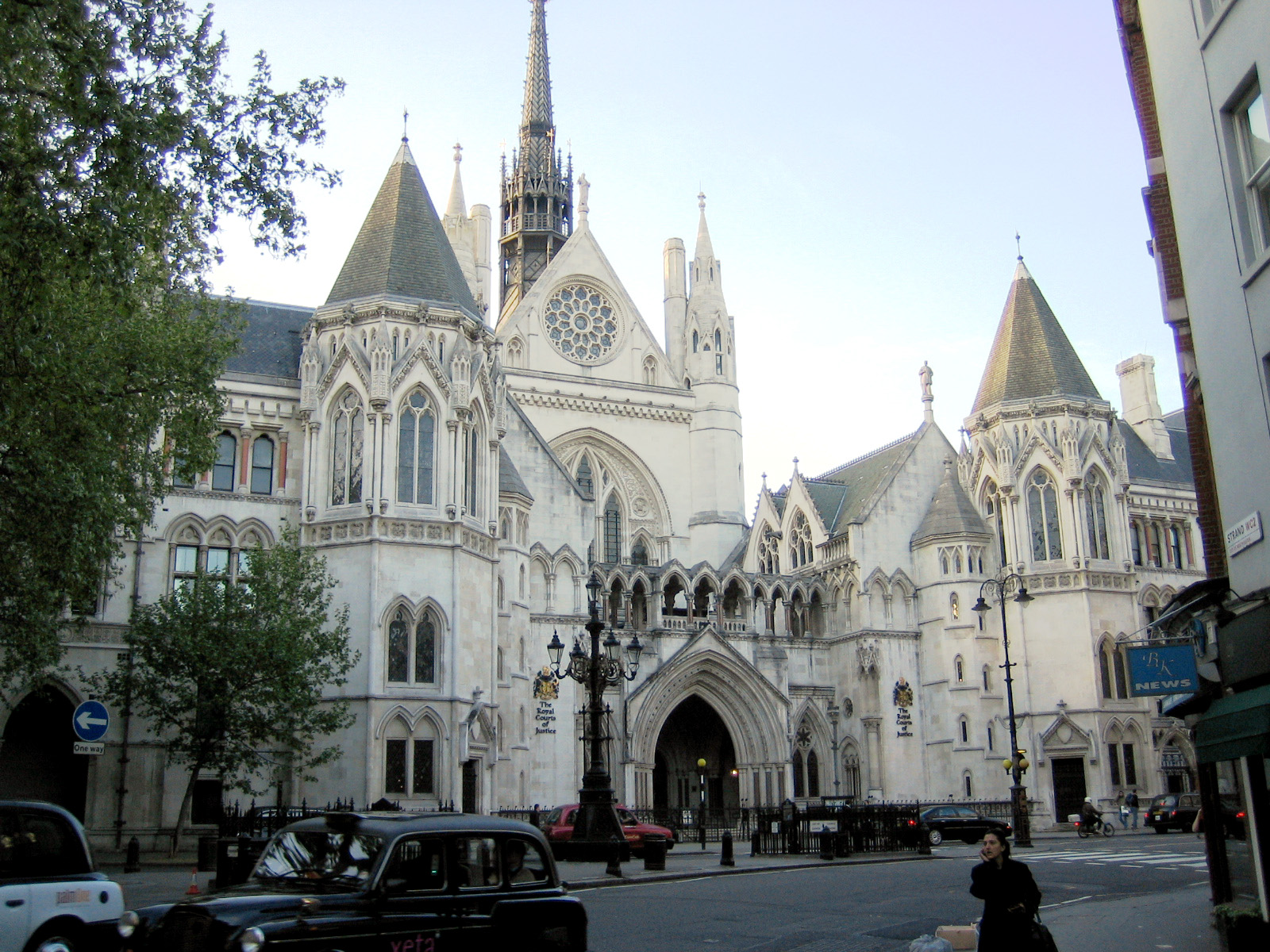
- Court: Court of Appeal
- Full case name: Attorney General v Ahkter
- Decided: 14 February 2020
- Citation: [2020] EWCA Civ 122; [2020] 2 WLR 1183; [2020] 2 FLR 139

Case opinions
- An Islamic ceremony of marriage which was not performed in accordance with the formalities required by the Marriage Act 1949 for the creation of a valid marriage under English law was a "non-qualifying ceremony" which did not create even a void marriage.

Keywords
- children's welfare; decrees of nullity; marriage ceremony; non-marriage; presumptions; religious marriages; void marriages

Ahkter v Khan [2020] EWCA 122, also known as Attorney General v Ahkter, is an English family law Court of Appeal case concerning the validity of an Islamic ceremony of marriage. A woman who recently divorced her husband petitioned the court to determine whether the marriage, resulting from a Nikah, was void marriage or a non-marriage. The Family Court had held the marriage was void, granting her financial remedies. The Court of Appeal subsequently reversed the decision and denied financial remedies. The case received much scholarly and media attention on the requirements for marriage and the protection of vulnerable spouses.

== Context ==
The Marriage Act 1949 and Matrimonial Causes Act 1973 set out conditions for a marriage ceremony to be recognized as valid, void, voidable or outside the Marriage Acts. A valid marriage satisfies all the conditions in the Marriage Acts; the parties may benefit from all the legal consequences such as equitable division of property and pension sharing. A void marriage fails one of the 'essential requirements' in the Marriage Act; a decree of nullity can be granted which allows the parties to get the same financial remedies as on divorce. A voidable marriage is one that can be annulled at the option of one of the parties if one of the grounds are met. A 'non-marriage' is outside the Marriage Acts, with the parties treated as a cohabiting couple.

== Facts ==
Mrs. Ahkter and Mr. Khan had taken part in an Islamic marriage ceremony at a London restaurant in 1998. It was common ground that the ceremony did not meet the requirements of the Marriage Act 1949 and therefore was not a valid marriage. Knowing that, they had intended to follow it with a civil ceremony compliant with English law. However, no such ceremony was performed, despite Mrs. Ahkter pressing for one. The couple subsequently had three children, and the wife petitioned for divorce in 2016. The "husband" defended, and the Attorney General intervened in the proceedings.

The issue was whether the 1998 ceremony created a "non-marriage" (which Mr. Khan and the Attorney General argued), or whether it created a void marriage in respect of which a decree of nullity could be pronounced, thereby entitling the wife to apply for financial remedy orders, which Mrs. Ahkter argued. There were therefore two questions: (1) whether there were ceremonies which could create "non-marriages"; (2) if there were, whether the 1998 ceremony created a non-marriage or a void marriage.

== Judgments ==
=== Family court ===
In NA v MSK [2018] EWFC 54, Williams J held that by reason of the husband's actions, there was no valid marriage. The starting point in relation to the interpretation and application of the Matrimonial Causes Act 1973, s11 stemmed from A v A [2012] EWHC 2219. He also considered the Articles 8 and 12 of the European Convention on Human Rights and Article 3 of the UN Convention on the Rights of the Child, stating:

'In this case where the husband led the wife to believe that they would undertake a civil ceremony as part of the process of marrying and has thus left her in the situation where she does not have a marriage which is valid under English law the husband himself has infringed her right to marry.'

What brought a ceremony within the scope of the Marriage Act 1949 had to be approached on a case-by-case basis. When considering the question of a marriage the court had to take a holistic view of a process rather than a single ceremony, taking into account whether: the ceremony or event set out or purported to be a lawful marriage, including whether the parties had agreed that the necessary legal formalities would be undertaken; it bore all or enough of the hallmarks of marriage including whether it was in public, whether it was witnessed, whether promises were made; the three key participants, most importantly the officiating official, believed, intended and understood the ceremony as giving rise to the status of lawful marriage; the failure to complete all the legal formalities was a joint decision or due to the failure of one party to complete them. Williams J granted a decree of nullity using this approach. Mr. Khan appealed.

=== Court of Appeal ===
The Court of Appeal (with Sir Terence Etherton MR, King LJ and Moylan LJ) allowed the appeal. There was "no ceremony in respect of which a decree of nullity could be granted" pursuant to the provisions of s11 of the Matrimonial Causes Act 1973.

Whether a court could grant a decree of nullity on the ground that a marriage was void was to be determined by the provisions of Matrimonial Causes Act 1973, s11 and the Marriage Act 1949. S11(a)(iii) applied only where the parties had intermarried according to the rites of the Church of England, under s25 of the 1949 Act or intermarried under s49, but had failed to comply with the formalities non-compliance with which ss25 and 49 expressly stipulated would make the marriage void. The Court of Appeal also held:

"As referred to above, however, we agree with observations that have been made about the unsatisfactory nature of the expression “non-marriage”. We consider that the focus should be on the ceremony and would propose that they should be called a “non-qualifying ceremony” to signify that they are outside the scope of both the 1949 and the 1973 Acts."

The right to marry under Article 12 was not engaged; even if it was, the facts did not give rise to any breach (considering Owens v Owens [2017] EWCA Civ 182):

"This court is bound by Owens ... It being “irrefutable” that there is no absolute right to be divorced under Article 12, the question is whether Article 12 applies to nullity. In our judgment it does not. Logic alone would dictate this to be the case but, in any event, casting back to the ECtHR’s words in Johnston, if Article 12 cannot cover ‘the dissolution of a marriage”, it cannot cover a situation where a marriage is declared null and void ab initio. In our judgment, counsel at first instance were right in their joint view that Article 12 has no place in this case."

Also, even though Article 8 was engaged, the state's failure to recognize the marriage did not breach the right. The right or grant of a degree of nullity does not itself engage Article 8, which means that there is no right to divorce. The court considered Williams J's reasoning to contradict the Law Reform (Miscellaneous Provision) Act 1970, s1, which abolished any legal effect of a promise to marry as no agreement to marry can take effect as a contract. It concludes:

"In addition, the question of whether a marriage is void must, in our view, depend on the facts as they were at the date of the alleged marriage. A marriage either is or is not void and either is or is not within the scope of the 1949 Act at the date of its alleged solemnisation. The determination of whether a marriage is void or not cannot, in our view, be wholly (or in part) dependent on future events, such as the intention to undertake another ceremony or whether there are children. There is no basis, under Article 8 or by virtue of the impact of Article 3 of the United Nations Convention on the Rights of the Child 1990 (“UNCRC”), by which the legal effect of the same ceremony could be converted including from a non-marriage to a void marriage."

Considering the above, the Nikah was a non-qualifying ceremony: the fact that the parties had intended to undertake a civil ceremony at a later date could not bring the Nikah ceremony within the scope of the 1949 Act. Therefore, Mrs. Ahkter was not entitled to a decree of nullity, nor financial remedies. The ceremony was not performed in a registered building and no notice had been given to the superintendent registrar. Also, no certificates had been issued and no registrar or authorised person was present. Finally, the parties were aware that the Nikah had no legal effect and failed to take a subsequent ceremony to make their marriage valid.

== Reactions ==
The case had generated much media attention and was criticized for failing to protect Muslim women who have no rights when it comes to divorce. Southall Black Sisters warned that the judgment would "outsource" justice on family matters to unaccountable and fundamentalist-inspired community-based systems of religious arbitration; it considered the matter not about recognising religious marriages; it is about the state guaranteeing equality to all before the law. The Guardian had supported Williams J's original judgment, considering that it allowed married women to gain rights without "violating anyone's religious conscience".

Tristan Cummings at Merton College, Oxford similarly criticized the Court of Appeal's judgment for over-relying on technical correctness rather than the "long-standing and ongoing hardships faced by religious minorities in a family law system historically constructed around Anglican family norms". Siddique Patel, on the other hand, considered the Court of Appeal to be more in line with the law and public policy grounds; however, he has called for reform in the law of unregistered faith marriages.

The Law Commission has published a Consultation Paper on proposals for reform to "modernise and improve" wedding law.
