= Melissa Miller =

Melissa Miller may refer to:

- Melissa Miller (artist) (born 1951), American painter
- Melissa Miller (politician), member of the New York State Assembly
- Melissa Miller, musician in Good 2 Go
- Melissa Miller in Miller v Miller
- Melissa Miller, producer on The Tested
- Emme (model) (Melissa Owens Miller, born 1963), plus-size fashion model

== See also ==
- Melissa Scott-Miller (born 1959), English artist
- Melissa Scott-Hayward (born 1990), cricketer
