= Ancillary relief =

Application for financial relief

In English law, an application for financial relief following the presentation of a petition for divorce, nullity or judicial separation used to be described as ancillary relief. The term arose because the financial application was 'ancillary' to the petition. However, the term was discarded by the Family Procedure Rules 2010 which substituted it with the term "application for a financial order".

== Explanation ==
The courts powers derive in large part from the Matrimonial Causes Act 1973, and in particular section 25(2) which sets out the statutory checklist of factors that should be taken into account. The court can order lump sum payments, property adjustment orders, periodical payments (known as 'maintenance') and (from 2000) pension sharing orders. For comparison, in the United States, alimony is awarded based on factors like marriage length, financial need, and capacity to support oneself, and may be temporary, rehabilitative, or permanent.

Maintenance orders can be given on nominal or specific terms. Nominal orders operate on the basis that if the court makes no maintenance order (known as "periodical payments") at the time of the final order, it cannot later make an order. If it does make an order, it can later vary it. An order for periodical payments at the rate of 5 pence per year (the usual nominal order) gives the recipient the right to later apply for a substantive monthly sum.

Following a 1984 amendment, the court is obliged to consider whether the parties' financial relationship should be terminated ('clean break').

== Legal rulings ==
The leading cases are now the House of Lords decisions of White v White 2001 1 A.C. 596 and Miller/ McFarlane.
