= Divorce (Religious Marriages) Act 2002 =

Act of the Parliament of the United Kingdom

Divorce (Religious Marriages) Act 2002 (Note: Section 2(1).)
- Act of Parliament
- Parliament of the United Kingdom
- Long title: An Act to make provision enabling a court to require the dissolution of a religious marriage before granting a civil divorce.
- Citation: 2002 c. 27
- Introduced by: Andrew Dismore (Commons); Lord Grabiner (Lords)
- Territorial extent: England and Wales (Note: Section 2(3).)

Dates
- Royal assent: 24 July 2002
- Commencement: 24 February 2003 (Note: Section 2(2). The Divorce (Religious Marriages) Act 2002 (Commencement) Order 2003 (SI 2003/186), article 2.)
Other legislation
Amends	Matrimonial Causes Act 1973; Family Law Act 1996

Status: Current legislation

Text of statute as originally enacted

Text of the Divorce (Religious Marriages) Act 2002 as in force today (including any amendments) within the United Kingdom, from legislation.gov.uk.

The Divorce (Religious Marriages) Act 2002 (c. 27) is an act of the Parliament of the United Kingdom. The act amends the Matrimonial Causes Act 1973 to allow one party to petition a court to not declare their divorce decree absolute until they have received a similar document from a religion's authority.

== Background ==
The need for the legislation was demonstrated in the 2000 divorce case of O v O.

Jewish law requires a civil divorce and a Get (religious divorce) for a person to remarry.

== Passage ==
The act was brought before Parliament by Andrew Dismore MP as a private members' bill under the Ten Minute Rule.

== Provisions ==
The act allows a civil judge to require that a civil divorce be delayed until a religious divorce has been carried out.

== Suggested reform ==
Muslim Women's Network UK has suggested amending the act to include Muslim divorces.

== Subsequent developments ==
The act itself has not been textually amended, but section 10A of the Matrimonial Causes Act 1973 has. The Constitutional Reform Act 2005 added a requirement that the Lord Chancellor consult the Lord Chief Justice before prescribing further usages, and a power for the Lord Chief Justice to nominate a judicial office holder to exercise his functions under the section, with effect from 3 April 2006. The Divorce, Dissolution and Separation Act 2020 replaced the references to a decree of divorce, decree nisi and decree absolute with references to a divorce order and a final order, with effect from 6 April 2022.

== See also ==
- Civil recognition of Jewish divorce
