= Family division =

Family division may refer to:

- High Court of Justice § Family Division, the Family Division of His Majesty's High Court of Justice in England
- Divorce
- Annulment
- Division of property
- Alimony
- Parental responsibility (access and custody)
- Dysfunctional family

== See also ==
- Family
- Family law
