= DVD (disambiguation) =

DVD, or digital video/versatile disc, is a digital optical disc data storage format.

DVD or dvd may also refer to:

== Medicine ==
- Developmental verbal dyspraxia, a condition in children involving problems saying sounds, syllables and words
- Dissociated vertical deviation, an eye condition associated with a squint

== Other uses ==
- D v D, a Court of Appeal of England and Wales case regarding residence in the United Kingdom
- D.V.D. v. Department of Homeland Security, United States court case on deportation and protection from torture
- Divers droite, or miscellaneous right, in France, right-wing candidates who are not members of any large party
- Driver vigilance device, a railroad safety device that operates in the case of incapacitation of the engineer
- "DVD", a song by Karol G from KG0516, 2021

== See also ==
- The DVD (disambiguation)
