= Scott schedule =

A Scott schedule is a document submitted to a court in Australia and the United Kingdom detailing the complaints regarding a third party which the court is being asked to consider. Such schedules are often used in court cases where there are several complaints of poor workmanship, for example in building work. This type of document takes its name from George Alexander Scott, an Official Referee in the tribunal which is now the Technology and Construction Court, who originally developed the idea.

The schedule uses a table, usually set out on A4 paper in landscape format. In the first column after the item number, the claimant would be expected to set out each complaint separately and in the next column to identify what it will cost to put the item right. Further columns allow the respondent to reply on each item.

Scott schedules are also used in child care cases. Part 12J of the Family Procedure Rules states that the Family Court or the High Court when dealing with family proceedings should consider:

Whether the key facts in dispute can be contained in a schedule or a table (known as a Scott Schedule) which sets out what the applicant complains of or alleges, what the respondent says in relation to each individual allegation or complaint; the allegations in the schedule should be focused on the factual issues to be tried; and if so, whether it is practicable for this schedule to be completed at the first hearing, with the assistance of the judge.
