= Legal proceeding =

Proceedings in any civil lawsuit or criminal prosecution

Legal proceeding is an activity that seeks to invoke the power of a tribunal in order to enforce a law. Although the term may be defined more broadly or more narrowly as circumstances require, it has been noted that "[t]he term legal proceedings includes proceedings brought by or at the instigation of a public authority, and an appeal against the decision of a court or tribunal". Legal proceedings are generally characterized by an orderly process in which participants or their representatives are able to present evidence in support of their claims, and to argue in favor of particular interpretations of the law, after which a judge, jury, or other trier of fact makes a determination of the factual and legal issues.

- Activities needed to have a court deem legal process to have been provided, such as through service of process.
- Conduct of a trial, whether a lawsuit or civil trial, or a criminal trial.
- Issuance and enforcement of court orders, including those imposing foreclosure or receivership.
- Hearings, particularly administrative hearings.
- Arbitration.

In the United States, Congressional hearings are not generally considered legal proceedings, as they are generally not directed towards the imposition of a penalty against a specific individual for a specific wrong. However, impeachment proceedings are generally conducted as legal proceedings, although experts dispute the question of whether they are primarily legal proceedings, or are merely political proceedings dressed in legal formalities and language. Richard Posner, for example, has asserted that it was "the intent of the framers of the Constitution that an impeachment proceeding be primarily a legal proceeding, akin to a criminal prosecution, rather than a political one".

== Legal case ==
A legal case is in a general sense a dispute between opposing parties which may be resolved by a court, or by some equivalent legal process. A legal case is typically based on either civil or criminal law. In most legal cases, there are one or more accusers and one or more defendants. In some instances, a legal case may occur between parties that are not in opposition, but require a legal ruling to formally establish some legal facts.

== Civil cases ==
A civil case, more commonly known as a lawsuit or controversy, begins when a plaintiff files a document called a complaint with a court, informing the court of the wrong that the plaintiff has allegedly suffered because of the defendant, and requesting a remedy. The remedy sought may be money, an injunction, which requires the defendant to perform or refrain from performing some action, or a declaratory judgment, which determines that the plaintiff has certain legal rights. The remedy will be prescribed by the court if the plaintiff wins the case. A civil case can also be arbitrated through arbitration, which may result in a faster settlement, with lower costs, than could be obtained by going through a trial.

The plaintiff must make a genuine and timely effort to inform the defendant of the case against them through service of process, by which the plaintiff delivers to the defendant the same documents that the plaintiff filed with the court. For example, in a UK case in 2009, documents had not been served on the defendant promptly due to uncertainty about the defendant's official address for purposes of service of documents. The court refused to extend the time for service of proceedings because of delay on the part of the plaintiff.

At any point during a case, the parties can agree to a settlement, which will end the case, although in some circumstances, such as in class actions, a settlement requires court approval in order to be binding.

=== Family cases ===
Cases involving separation including asset division, support (also known as maintenance or alimony), and matters related to children are handled differently in different jurisdictions. Often, the court's procedure for dealing with family cases is very similar to that of a civil case (it requires service and disclosure, and will issue judgments).

Divorce and separation from a spouse is one of the most stressful situations, as rated by the Holmes and Rahe Stress Scale, and so family proceedings are increasingly being "divorced" from the often very formal and impersonal process of civil proceedings, and given special treatment.

== Criminal case ==
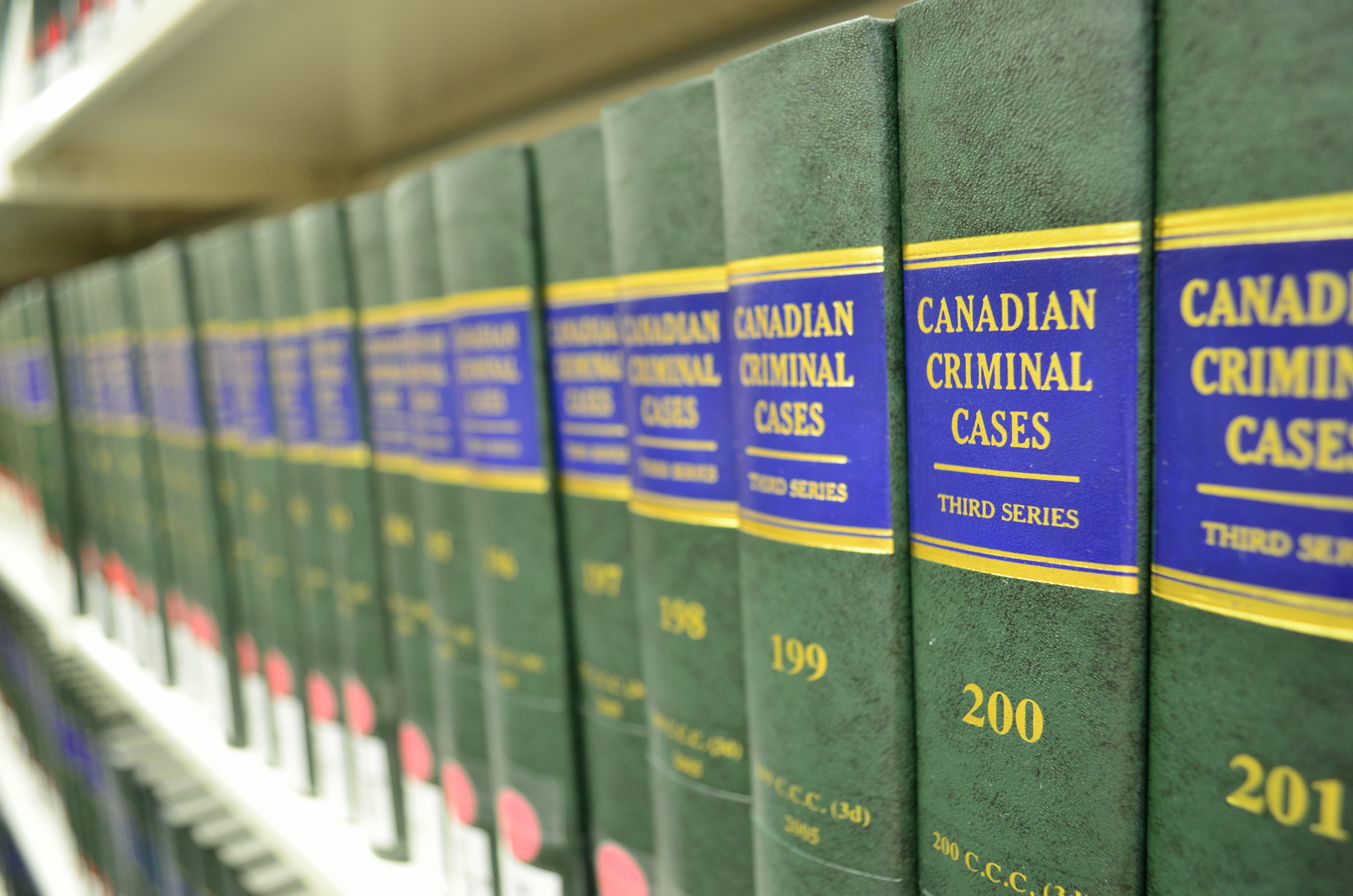
Canadian criminal cases

A criminal case, in common law jurisdictions, begins when a person suspected of a crime is indicted by a grand jury or otherwise charged with the offense by a government official called a prosecutor or district attorney.

A criminal case may in some jurisdictions be settled before a trial through a plea bargain. Typically, in a plea bargain, the defendant agrees to plead guilty to a lesser charge than that which was originally brought by the grand jury or prosecutor. A defendant who goes to trial risks greater penalties than would normally be imposed through a plea bargain.

== Common elements ==
Legal cases, whether criminal or civil, are premised on the idea that a dispute will be fairly resolved when a legal procedure exists by which the dispute can be brought to a factfinder not otherwise involved in the case, who can evaluate evidence to determine the truth with respect to claims of guilt, innocence, liability, or lack of fault. Details of the procedure may depend on both the kind of case and the kind of legal system in which the case is brought.

=== Designation and citation ===
In most systems, the governing body responsible for overseeing the courts assigns a unique number/letter combination or similar designation to each case in order to track the various disputes that are or have been before it. The outcome of the case is recorded, and can later be reviewed by obtaining a copy of the documents associated with the designation previously assigned to the case.

However, it is often more convenient to refer to cases – particularly landmark and other notable cases – by a title of the form Claimant v Defendant (e.g. Arkell v Pressdram). Where a legal proceeding does not have formally designated adverse parties, a form such as In re, Re or In the matter of is used (e.g. In re Gault). The "v" separating the parties is an abbreviation of the Latin versus, but, when spoken in Commonwealth countries, it is normally rendered as "and" or "against" (as in, for example, Charles Dickens' Jarndyce and Jarndyce). Where it is considered necessary to protect the anonymity of a natural person, some cases may have one or both parties replaced by a standard pseudonym (Jane Roe in Roe v. Wade) or by an initial (D v D). In titles such as R v Adams, however, the initial "R" is usually an abbreviation for the Latin Rex or Regina, i.e. for the Crown. (For an explanation of other terms that may appear in case titles, see the Glossary of legal terms.)

== See also ==
- Administrative proceeding
- Case law
- Early case assessment
- Lists of case law
- Removal proceedings
