= Arbili v Arbili =

English family law case

Arbili v Arbili [2015] EWCA Civ 542 is an English Court of Appeal case on whether a financial order in a divorce could set aside on the basis of information obtained through hacking.

== Facts ==
The parties, Mr and Mrs Arbili, had been married for seven years before divorcing and engaging in financial proceedings to split the family's assets.

At the initial hearing, an order was made for the assets to split. Mrs Arbili received equity from a number of properties including the family home (a £1m grade-II listed barn in Essex), one of two French villas held Mr Arbili's name and a £140,000 lump sum, taking the total received to over £600,000. This allowed her to purchase a new home.

However, Mr Arbili instructed agents to delve into his ex-wife's finances and found that she was in line to receive a share of a £2.1m property on the French Riviera that belonged to her parents. This information was obtained by hacking into her emails. Mr Arbili sought to rely on this to set aside the financial order, stating that Mrs Arbili had not complied with her obligations to provide full disclosure while the financial proceedings. Mrs Arbili argued that given her interest in her parents' property, he would not have included his French villa in considering the original financial proceedings.

The application to set aside the order was refused and Mr Arbili appealed.

== Judgment ==
The Court of Appeal dismissed the appeal. It found that the trial judge had properly weighed up whether to consider the illicitly-obtained information, and the decision to exclude it fell "well within the reasonable band of discretion afforded to him".

== See also ==
- Divorce in England and Wales
