= Tanner v Tanner =

1975 English land law and family law case

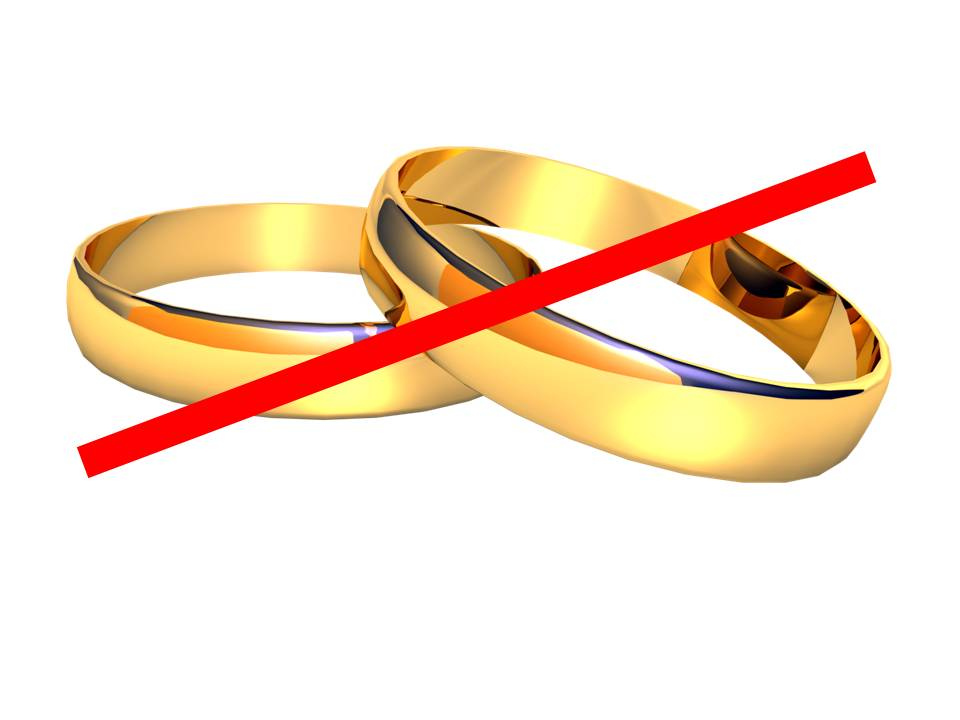
- Court: Court of Appeal
- Citation: [1975] 1 WLR 1346

Keywords
- Licence, Constructive Trust, Cohabitees, Children

Tanner v Tanner [1975] 1 WLR 1346 is an English land law and family law case, concerning implied licenses and constructive trusts in land between cohabiting couples with children.

== Facts ==
Mr Tanner, ‘milkman by day and a croupier by night’, got involved with Miss Macdermott while still married, she had twins girls in 1969 and changed her name to Mrs Tanner, though he never married her. She moved in with him in 1970, giving up her rent controlled tenancy hoping she would remain there until the twins left school. Mr Tanner did divorce his first wife, but then married another woman, and offered Mrs Tanner £4000 to leave, and maintenance that he had not previously paid. She refused. He brought an action to remove her, and succeeded at first instance. She left, and went to a council flat, but appealed, arguing that he was under a contractual duty to allow her to remain until the twins left school, although she merely claimed damages.

== Judgment ==
Lord Denning MR held that the licence could not be terminated, so that Miss Macdermott was entitled to remain in the house. He said as follows.

There was, it is true, no express contract to that effect, but the circumstances are such that the court should imply a contract by him… whereby they were entitled to have the use of the house as their home until the girls had finished school. It may be that if circumstances changed - so that the accommodation was not reasonably required - the licence might determinable. But it was not determinable in the circumstances in which he sought to determine it, namely to turn her out with the children and to bring in his new wife with her family. It was a contractual licence of the kind which is specifically enforceable on her behalf, and which he can be restrained from breaking, and he could not sell the house over her head so as to get her out in that way.

== See also ==
- English trusts law
- English land law
- English family law
