= The DVD =

The DVD may refer to:

- The DVD (Napalm Death video), a 2001 DVD release of earlier performances by Napalm Death
- Lexy & K-Paul – The DVD, a 2005 DVD release of material by Lexy & K-Paul
- Milk Inc. – The DVD, a 2004 DVD release of material by Milk Inc.
- "The DVD" (The Amazing World of Gumball), the first episode of the animated sitcom

== See also ==
- DVD (disambiguation)
