= Decree nisi =

Type of court order with conditions

A decree nisi, also called rule nisi (from Latin nisi 'unless'), is a court order that will come into force at a future date unless a particular condition is met. Unless the condition is met, the ruling becomes a decree absolute (rule absolute), and is binding. Typically, the condition is that an adversely affected party provide satisfactory evidence or argument that the decree should not take effect (i.e. the decree takes effect unless the party shows that it should not). For that reason, a decree nisi may also be called a rule, order or decree to show cause.

Using the example of a divorce, the wording of such a decree is generally in the form of "that the marriage solemnized on (date) between AB and CD, be dissolved by reason of (grounds) UNLESS sufficient cause be shown to the court why this decree should not be made absolute within six weeks". This allows time for any party who objects to the divorce to come forward with those objections. When no objection is raised by either party, an automatic dissolution takes effect.

The term is used in many common law jurisdictions, but is more common in the United Kingdom than in the United States.

== Usages ==
In most common law jurisdictions, a decree nisi must be obtained in possession proceedings before the court will order foreclosure under a mortgage enforcement.

This form of ruling has become a rarity in recent times, with few exceptions: in some jurisdictions, it is still a standard stage of divorce proceedings. In Hong Kong, and in England and Wales, section 1(5) of the Matrimonial Causes Act 1973 provides that "Every decree of divorce shall in the first instance be a decree nisi and shall not be made absolute before the expiration of six months from its grant", and section 9(1) allows any person (including the King's Proctor), before the decree is made absolute, to "show cause why the decree should not be made absolute by reason of material facts not having been brought before the court".

In England and Wales, the minimum interval between the granting of decree nisi and that of decree absolute was amended by the Family Law Act 1996 and is now six weeks. In practice, courts use an interval of six weeks and one day.

Another exception regarding orders nisi is where a creditor seeks to place a charge on land for money owed. A court, on the production of certain evidence, will make a charging order nisi and a hearing date is set. If the court is satisfied at the hearing that the creditor is entitled to have a charge on the debtor's property, it will grant a charging order absolute.

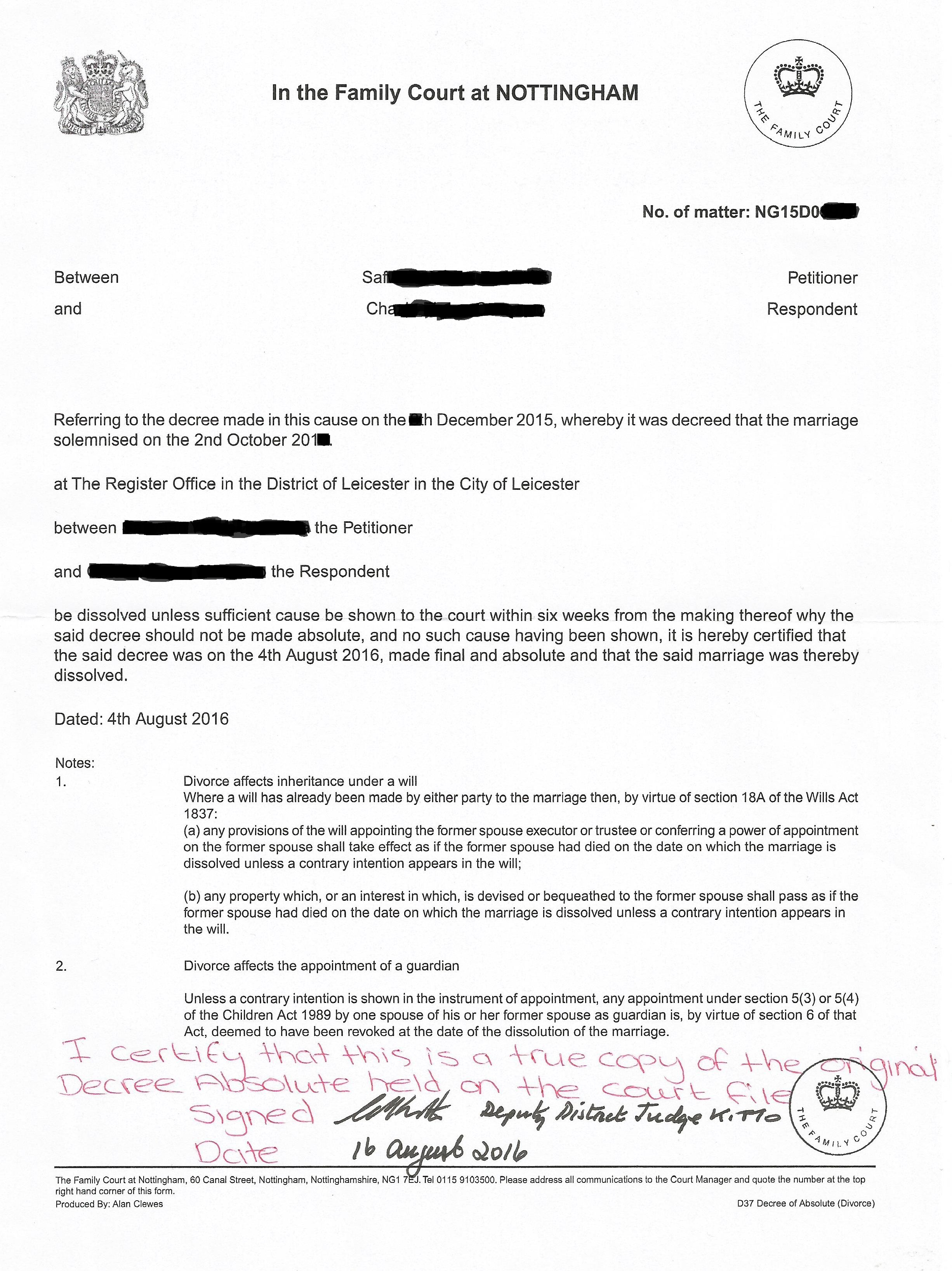
Exemplified certified copy of Decree Absolute issued by The Family Court Deputy District Judge – divorce certificate
