= Legal consequences of marriage and civil partnership in England and Wales =

This is a list of legal consequences of forming a marriage or civil partnership in England and Wales.

- For the purposes of capital gains tax, a married couple and civil partners can claim private residence relief for only one dwelling, even if they live apart.
- Married couples and civil partners can possess joint property without needing to agree a contract.
- A spouse or civil partner of a British citizen, or of someone with settled status, can apply for a visa.
- A person may not be compelled by a criminal court to disclose private communications with their spouse.
- When a married couple or civil partners separate, the courts have wide powers to divide their property and may set aside prenuptial agreements.
- Wills are revoked on marriage or formation of a civil partnership (unless made in contemplation of marriage/formation of a civil partnership). Similarly, a divorced former spouse cannot benefit from a will made before divorce/dissolution.
- No inheritance tax is payable on an estate inherited by a surviving spouse or civil partner, if they are UK domiciled.
- The surviving spouse inherits part or all of the estate of a spouse who dies intestate. The rules around intestacy are different in the countries of the UK. In England and Wales, if there are children, the survivor inherits the first £125,000 plus personal possessions plus a life interest in half the remainder; if there are no children but the deceased has surviving parents or siblings, the surviving spouse inherits the first £200,000 plus personal possessions plus half the remainder; otherwise the survivor inherits the whole estate.
- The surviving spouse is paid a proportion of their deceased spouse's pension. The exact amount has been a subject of legal challenge following the Marriage (Same Sex Couples) Act 2013: same-sex couples are only entitled to pass on a proportion of their pension since the 2005 introduction of civil partnerships, considerably lowering the amount of pension provision they could pass on in the event of their death, compared to the position if they had been married to an opposite-sex partner. A legal challenge to change this failed in 2015.
- Women who become spouses to male peers and knights usually receive titles which last for the length of a marriage. Men who are married to women who are made dames do not receive titles. In the case of same-sex partnerships, whether civil partnerships or marriages, the male spouse of an ennobled man does not get any title—nor would the female partner of a similarly ennobled woman. David Furnish, the husband of Sir Elton John, has argued that there remains a legal inequality on this matter.

== See also ==
- Marriage in the United Kingdom
- Civil partnership in the United Kingdom
