= Miller v Miller =

- Court: House of Lords
- Full case name: Alan Miller and Melissa Miller
- Decided: 24 May 2006
- Citation: [2006] UKHL 24
- Cases cited: White v White [2001] 1 A.C. 596, SRJ v DWJ (Financial Provision) [1999] 2 FLR 176, R v R [1992] 1 AC 599, Foster v Foster [2003] EWCA Civ 565; [2003] 2 FLR 299, Leslie v Leslie [1911] P 203, Cornick v Cornick (No 3) [2001] 2 FLR 1240, Minton v Minton [1979] AC 593
- Legislation cited: Matrimonial Causes Act 1973, Family Law (Scotland) Act 1985, Matrimonial Causes Act 1866, Matrimonial and Family Proceedings Act 1984, Family Law Act 1996, Divorce (Scotland) Act 1976, Divorce Jurisdiction, Court Fees and Legal Aid (Scotland) Act 1983, Welfare Reform and Pensions Act 1999, Family Law (Scotland) Act 2006, Matrimonial Proceedings and Property Act 1970, Pensions Act 1995

Case history
- Subsequent action: None

Court membership
- Judges sitting: Lord Nicholls of Birkenhead, Lord Hoffman, Lord Hope of Craigshead, Baroness Hale of Richmond, and Lord Mance

Keywords
- Divorce; Financial provision; Matrimonial property

Miller v Miller 2006 (House of Lords) is a divorce (property settlement) case between Alan Miller and Melissa Miller. He is an asset manager in the City of London who had a fortune of some £30m (per The Times - which says 17.5m in property plus 18.5 in shares). Melissa was entitled to £5 million of her former husband's assets after just two years and nine months of marriage, no children, the Law Lords ruled. Five Law Lords agreed that the benchmark for division should be equal shares - save in certain circumstances - no matter how short the marriage. They said that to achieve fairness at the end of a marriage, the courts should look to three main considerations: financial needs, compensation, and equal sharing.

McFarlane v McFarlane [2006] was a conjoined appeal. This case similarly dealt with a high earning husband, but it concerned a long term marriage. At issue was the wife's periodic payments as compensation for the disparity in earning capacity that existed at the end of the marriage. The wife was awarded 250,000 p.a. for 5 years and potentially for life. There were children in that case.
