= Owens v Owens =

2018 Supreme Court of the UK case

- Court: Supreme Court of the United Kingdom
- Decided: 25 July 2018
- Citation: [2018] UKSC 41, [2018] AC 899, [2018] 3 WLR 634, [2018] 4 All ER 721, [2018] 2 FCR 796, [2018] 2 FLR 1067, [2018] WLR(D) 485

Case history
- Prior action: [2017] EWCA Civ 182

Court membership
- Judges sitting: Lady Hale, Lord Mance, Lord Wilson, Lord Hodge, Lady Black

Keywords
- Divorce in England and Wales

Owens v Owens [2018] UKSC 41 was a Supreme Court of the United Kingdom case involving the divorce of Mr and Mrs Owens, a couple who had married in 1978. The Supreme Court upheld a decision made at trial, and previously upheld by the Court of Appeal, to refuse a contested divorce petition by Mrs Owens, on the basis that the trial judge could not conclude that Mr Owens's behaviour towards his wife amounted to behaviour so unreasonable that a reasonable person could not be expected to live with him. The Supreme Court and the Court of Appeal expressed regret at not being able to grant the divorce petition, and public reaction to the perceived unfairness Mrs Owens was placed in led to the passage of the Divorce, Dissolution and Separation Act 2020.

== Facts ==
Mr Hugh John Owens and Mrs Tini Owens married in 1978 and had two children together, both adults when divorce proceedings began. Mrs Owens had considered getting divorced in 2012, and had also pursued an affair between November 2012 and August 2013, at which point the affair had been discovered by Mr Owens. Mrs Owens left the marital home in February 2015, and filed for divorce in May. Mrs Owens' divorce petition stated that the marriage had irretrievably broken down and that Mr Owens had behaved in a way that Mrs Owens could not be expected to live with. Mr Owens contested the divorce, and a hearing was arranged for October 2015.

As was normal in divorce cases at the time, Mrs Owens had initially filed a small number of claims of unacceptable behaviour, but after she was notified that Mr Owens sought to contest the divorce petition, she amended her complaint to advance 27 examples of behaviour by her husband that she claimed amounted to behaviour contrary to s1(2)(b) of the Matrimonial Causes Act 1973. Only a small number of these were discussed at trial.

Following a hearing, the trial judge, HHJ Tolson, concluded that the examples given by Mrs Owens were "flimsy", the context and seriousness of them had been "exaggerated", a number of the examples were isolated incidents rather than representing a pattern of conduct, and some examples had been cherry-picked. Although he recognised that rejecting the divorce petition would "leave them stymied in lives neither of them wish to lead", Judge Tolson found that Mrs Owens' petition did not satisfy s1(2)(b) of the 1973 Act and thus rejected it.

== At the Court of Appeal ==
On appeal, Mrs Owens advanced a number of arguments, including the suggestion that Judge Tolson had used a flawed, overly short process, had failed to account for the cumulative effect of Mr Owens's behaviour on Mrs Owens, and had not assessed her subjective characteristics. She also argued that the requirement to prove 'fault' in a divorce petition was contrary to Article 8 and Article 12 of the European Convention on Human Rights.

The Court of Appeal rejected all of these arguments. In response to the Convention-based argument, citing Johnston v Ireland and Babiarz v Poland, they concluded that the convention's right to marry or right to respect for a private and family life does not guarantee a right to a divorce, nor does it guarantee a right to a favourable outcome of a divorce.

The Court of Appeal noted significant changes in social attitudes towards marriage and family since the passage of the Divorce Reform Act 1969 and the Matrimonial Causes Act 1973, including the outlawing of marital rape in R v R, the significant rise in unmarried cohabitation, and the extension of marriage to gay couples. The Court also noted that for the vast majority of couples who are seeking a divorce, the "behaviour" that has to be exhibited is "anodyne" and a mere formality:

In the vast majority of such cases the petition proceeds without interrogation. The respondent is not even put to the trouble, nor his conscience stretched, by having to engage either with the facts alleged by the petitioner or even with the allegation that the marriage has irretrievably broken down, let alone with the contention that his behaviour has been unreasonable. All he has to do is put the word "No" in the relevant box in answer to the question in paragraph 4 of the acknowledgment of service: "Do you intend to defend the case?" Consistently with the form of the acknowledgment of service, the respondent does not even have to verify it by a statement of truth.

== At the Supreme Court ==
The Supreme Court upheld the decisions of the High Court and Court of Appeal, with the court president Lady Hale expressing "uneasy feelings" about the result.

== Reception ==
The ruling led the government committing to reform the law on divorce and Parliament passing the Divorce, Dissolution and Separation Act 2020.

== See also ==
- Divorce in England and Wales
