= Division of property =

Legal term

Division of property, also known as equitable distribution, is a division of property and debt between spouses when the marital relationship is ending. It may be done by agreement, through a property settlement, or by judicial decree.

Distribution of property is the division, due to a death or the dissolution of a marriage, of property which was owned by the deceased, or acquired during the course of the marriage.

== United Kingdom law ==
In England & Wales, partners in or out of marriage can agree how the joint and severally hold assets will be divided without the intervention of the courts. Where agreement cannot be reached, the courts may be asked to determine a fair and equitable division. The case of Miller v Miller gave the wife a considerable proportion of the husband's recent gains resulting from dealings in the City even though the marriage was short lived.

== United States law ==
In Ferguson v. Ferguson, 639 So.2d 921 (Miss. 1994), the court described equitable distribution of marital property at divorce as more fair, or equitable, than the separate property system. The court may consider such factors as "substantial contribution to the accumulation of the property, the market and emotional value of the assets, tax and other economic consequences of the distribution, the parties' needs, and any other factor relevant to an equitable outcome." Fairness is the prevailing guideline the court will use. Alimony payments, child support obligations and all other property will be considered. Even non-tangible contributions such as a spouse's domestic contributions to the household will be taken into account, whether that spouse has anything titled in their name or not. A spouse who has made non-tangible contributions may claim an equitable interest in the marital property at divorce.

The Uniform Marriage and Divorce Act §307 (UMDA §307) also allows for the equitable distribution of property and lists factors the court should consider, e.g. "the duration of the marriage, and prior marriage of either party, antenuptial agreement of the parties [which is the same as a prenuptial agreement or premarital agreement], the age, health, station, occupation, amount and sources of income, vocational skills, employability, estate, liabilities, and needs of each of the parties, custodials provisions..." etc. Marital misconduct is not a factor in the decision-making process.

Another form of property distribution at divorce is called "community property distribution".

Equitable distribution is not the same as equal distribution. For example, upon dissolution of a marriage in which the wife served as a stay-at-home mother for a substantial portion of the marriage, a court may award the wife a more-than-50% share of distributed property as advance compensation for her projected need to return to the work force at a lower wage than she would have been able to command had she spent her time developing outside-the-home work experience rather than laboring inside the home.
