= Good 2 Go =

American contemporary R&B group

Good 2 Go was a female R&B/dance vocal group from Los Angeles, consisting of Melissa Miller, Natalie Fernie, Kathy Webb, Cindy Shows and Melissa Brauchler. Their single "Never Satisfied" peaked at #64 on the Billboard Pop Singles and at #10 on Billboard's R&B chart in 1992. The group released only one album, a self-titled release on Giant Records.

== History ==
The group consisted of singers Melissa Miller, Natalie Fernie, Kathy Webb, Cindy Shows, and Missy Newman, they got a record deal with Giant Records. In 1992, they released their first album Good 2 Go, the album had singles “Never Satisfied” which peaked at number 64 on Billboard Hot 100 and it peaked number 10 on Billboard’s Hot R&B Singles Chart, it was their only music video. the second single “He Thinks He’s All That” which didn’t chart. The group made live appearances on Soul Train and on BET’s Video Soul with Sherry Carter. The album failed to chart and giant records droppped the group from the label, in 2009 Natalie Fernie on YouTube did 3 interviews videos on a YouTube channel called “beyond the album cover”, where she speaks about her and her former band mates experience in the music industry.

== Good 2 Go album ==
=== Tracklist ===
1. Good 2 Go (4:14)
2. Go With The Flow (3:19)
3. Notice Me (5:09)
4. Money Can't Buy Love (4:33)
5. White House (3:32)
6. Never Satisfied (4:38)
7. He Thinks He's All That (3:37)
8. Don't Want To Change You (3:20)
9. Romance You (5:21)
10. Oooooo Song (4:25)
