= Divorce in Scotland =

Actions for divorce in Scotland may be brought in either the Sheriff Court or the Court of Session. In practice, it is only actions in which unusually large sums of money are in dispute, or with an international element, that are raised in the Court of Session. If, as is usual, there are no contentious issues, it is not necessary to employ a lawyer.

== General ==
The Divorce (Scotland) Act 1976 as amended by the Family Law (Scotland) Act 2006 provides for divorce grounds. Family law issues are devolved, so are now the responsibility of the Scottish Parliament and Scottish Government.

Financial consequences of divorce are dealt with by the Family Law (Scotland) Act 1985. This provides for a division of matrimonial property on divorce. Matrimonial property is generally all the property acquired by the spouses during the marriage but before their separation, as well as housing and furnishings acquired for use as a home before the marriage, but excludes property gifted or inherited. Either party to the marriage can apply to the court for an order under the 1985 Act. The court can make orders for the payment of a capital sum, the transfer of property, the payment of periodical sums, and other incidental orders. In making an order, the court is, under the Act, guided by the following principles:

1. The net value of the matrimonial property should be shared fairly, and the starting point is that it should be shared equally; but
2. fair account should be taken of economic advantage derived by either party from contributions by the other, and of economic disadvantage suffered by either party in the interests of the other party or of the family; and
3. The economic burden of caring for a child of the marriage under 16 years should be shared fairly between the parties (but child support is not normally awarded by the court, as this is in most cases a matter for the Child Support Agency).

The general approach of the Scottish courts is to settle financial issues by the award of a capital sum if at all possible, allowing for a ‘clean break’ settlement, but in some cases periodical allowances may be paid, usually for a limited period. Fault is not normally taken into account.

Decisions as to parental responsibilities, such as residence and contact orders, are dealt with under the Children (Scotland) Act 1995. The guiding principle is the best interests of the child, although the starting assumption is in practice that it is in a child’s best interests to maintain contact with the non-custodial parent.

== Grounds for divorce ==
Divorce is now regulated by the Divorce (Scotland) Act 1976 as amended by the Family Law (Scotland) Act 2006, which provides two legal grounds for divorce: the "irretrievable breakdown of the marriage" or where one party has undergone gender reassignment surgery and obtained an interim gender recognition certificate. Irretrievable breakdown is proved by one of the parties to the marriage showing that one or more defined circumstances exist. This eliminates the need for the judge to conduct an intimate examination of the relationship between the parties. There are "fault" and "no fault" grounds provided in the Act, and the speed at which a divorce can be obtained will be determined by what circumstances are relied on in the divorce proceedings. It is not possible for both parties to submit a joint petition for divorce, divorce cases must always have a person seeking the divorce (the pursuer) and a person arguing against the divorce (the defender).

The circumstances that will lead to a finding by the court that there is an irretrievable breakdown of the marriage are:

- the defender's adultery;
- behaviour of the defender that makes it unreasonable for the pursuer to live with the defender;
- not living as husband and wife for one year and there is consent to the divorce from both parties;
- not living as husband and wife for two years when one party objects to the divorce.

=== Adultery and behaviour ===
If the pursuer establishes an irretrievable breakdown of the marriage on grounds of adultery or behaviour then they can obtain a divorce immediately, while the other grounds require some period of prior separation. Circumstantial evidence can be provided to support the claims of the pursuer and the case is determined "on the balance of probability" rather than "beyond a reasonable doubt". Therefore, for example, evidence of a husband staying in a hotel room with another woman for a night will likely establish adultery, even if sexual intercourse cannot be proved. The pursuer cannot seek a divorce based on their own adultery and the adulterous sexual intercourse committed by the defender must have been voluntary. To found a divorce on the behaviour of the defender the behaviour must be such as a reasonable person could not be expected to live with the defender. The behaviour can be from one event, though showing a pattern is more likely to convince the court, and it is irrelevant if the behaviour is passive or active or caused by a mental abnormality. There is no exact list of what behaviour will constitute grounds and the case law is filled with different examples. The finding by the court that the defender is at "fault" for the divorce will, however, not affect the amount of financial provision awarded or arrangements regarding any children.

=== Separation ===
If the parties have not lived together as husband and wife for a period of one year and both parties consent to the divorce then this establishes an irretrievable breakdown of the marriage. The defender's consent to the divorce must be granted at the court proceedings and can be withheld for any reason or no reason at all. According to Stair, the defender to a divorce will often use their granting of consent as a way of bargaining favourable financial provision or arrangements concerning children.

If the defender does not consent to the divorce, then the pursuer will only be able to establish an irretrievable breakdown of the marriage once the couple has not lived together as husband and wife for two years.

== Issuing a decree of divorce ==
The court will suspend divorce proceedings if there is reason to believe that a reconciliation between the parties is possible. The court can also delay issuing a decree for divorce where one of the parties will be prevented from remarrying on religious grounds and the other party is able to take steps to prevent this impediment from arising, such as through a religious annulment of the marriage. Once the impediment is removed the court will then issue the divorce decree.

== See also ==
- Divorce in England and Wales
