= Vivien Mitchell =

Irish field hockey player

Personal information
- Born: 31 August 1954 (age 72)

Sport
- Sport: Field hockey
National team
| Years | Team | Caps | Goals |
| – | Ireland | | - |

Vivien Mitchell (born 31 August 1954) is a former field hockey international player, who played in goal for Ireland.

== Career ==
She began as a reserve to Mary Geaney, but was goalie in her own right when she played in a match at Wembley in 1979. Her first full International was played against Argentina in Belfast in September 1978 and she was the Irish goalie for the World Cup in Vancouver, British Columbia, Canada in 1979. She retired from field hockey in 1984.

== Personal life ==
She now lives in Edinburgh. She is a grandmother and she and her partner became the first female couple to celebrate their civil partnership in Scotland on 20 December 2005.
