= Article 12 of the European Convention on Human Rights =

Article 12 of the European Convention on Human Rights (ECHR) provides for two constituent rights: the right to marry and the right to found a family. With an explicit reference to ‘national laws governing the exercise of this right’, Article 12 raises issues as to the doctrine of the margin of appreciation, and the related principle of subsidiarity most prominent in European Union Law. It has most prominently been utilised, often alongside Article 8 of the Convention, to challenge the denial of same sex marriage in the domestic law of a Contracting state.

== Text ==
Men and women of marriageable age have the right to marry and to found a family, according to the national laws governing the exercise of this right

== Application ==
As a right contained in the ECHR, Article 12 is available to anyone within the jurisdiction of a Council of Europe member state, otherwise considered as a contracting party to the Convention.

The right contained in Article 12 is closely related to Article 8 of the Convention, which secures a right to respect for one's "private and family life, his home and his correspondence." Article 12 has not been as widely used as Article 8 in arguments for rights regarding family and relationships, but it has played in a role in counter-arguments to sham marriage accusations and it is playing a growing role in challenges to laws regarding same-sex unions. Because Article 8 has been a reliable source for claims relating to family, relationships and home, jurisprudence on Article 12 has been left fairly thin.

Similar provisions exist in a number of other International human rights documents. The ECHR was the first instrument to give effect to certain rights stated in the Universal Declaration of Human Rights (UDHR) and made them binding within Europe, so as expected, Article 16(1) of the UDHR contains a similar provision:

Men and women of full age, without any limitation due to race, nationality or religion, have the right to marry and to found a family.

The International Covenant on Civil and Political Rights (ICCPR) also guarantees that the right to marry will be recognised in Article 23(2):

The right of men and women of marriageable age to marry and to found a family shall be recognized.

=== The principle of subsidiarity ===
Protocol No. 15, not yet in force, introduces specific reference to the principle of subsidiarity in the Preamble of the Convention. Subsidiarity was included in the Treaty on European Union and later the Maastricht Treaty and is a fundamental part of the functioning of European Union law. Von Staden, an international organisations academic, and Jean-Paul Costa, the former President of the Court, have said that an element of subsidiarity that has been integrated into the institutional design of the Court via the requirement that applicants exhaust domestic remedies prior to being eligible to lodge an application at Strasbourg. Other legal origins of the principle of subsidiarity in the ECHR have been found in Article 1 (obligation to respect human rights), 13 (right to an effective remedy), 19 (establishment of the Court) and 35(1)(admissibility criteria).

Mowbray has explained that the principle of subsidiarity is twin limbed. The first is the procedural limb requiring all domestic remedies to be exhausted before lodging complaints at Strasburg. The second in the substantive limb through which the Court limits its own ability to review a domestic authority’s decision. The latter has three parts. First, the Court does not seek to supplant domestic courts' primary role in delivering interpretations of national law; second, where the Convention has placed a duty of specific conduct on the national authority; and third, through the Court’s creation of the margin of appreciation doctrine.

Mowbray argues that the doctrine is the product of subsidiarity: "it is a technique developed to allocate decision-making authority to the proper body in the Convention scheme to delineate in concrete cases the boundary between "primary" national discretion and the "subsidiary" international supervision." This understanding distinguishes subsidiarity and the doctrine of the margin of appreciation as two separate concepts.

The right to marry as contained in Article 12 of the Convention could be considered a specific example of Mowbray’s understanding of the European Court of Human Rights (ECtHR) application of the substantive limb of the principle of subsidiarity. First, "In order to avoid trespassing on a State's sovereignty, the Court will intervene only when it is absolutely necessary to do so." This discretion (to properly interpret Article 12 in the context of domestic norms) is not unlimited and goes hand-in-hand with European supervision through the court.

Second, Article 12 places a specific duty of conduct on national authorities to uphold the right in the context of national laws governing marriage plainly by its wording. And finally, the right to marry has proven to be a right where the Court has developed a clear and wide margin of appreciation.

=== The doctrine of the margin of appreciation ===
The margin of appreciation (or margin of state discretion) is a fundamental part of the jurisprudence of the ECtHR in interpreting and applying the provisions of the ECHR. Similar to subsidiarity, it is not explicitly referred to in the Convention itself but is the product of the Strasbourg organs. The task of the Strasbourg organs is to examine domestic interpretations of the Convention and decide whether they are compatible with the universality of the Convention’s norms and whether they should be sanctioned for derogations which "restrict the right in such a way or to such an extent that the very essence of the right is impaired." Therefore, the margin of appreciation can be better understood as "a matter of who takes the decisions, rather than what those decisions might be."

Hutchinson explains that in practice the margin of appreciation as to a State's domestic implementation of Convention standards can become wider or narrower depending on the surrounding circumstances of the alleged breach being heard by the Court. Derogations from the Convention ultimately rest on the concept of domestic necessity in Contracting State societies, and so a natural consequence becomes situation-oriented margins of appreciation.

In respect of the ECHR, a margin will be narrower where there is a substantial degree of European consensus among member states around acceptable limitations on a certain Convention right, and wider where there is no such consensus. This has become particularly evident in the case of Article 12 and the right to marry, especially in relation to same-sex marriage. In more than one case, the Court has said that in relation to Article 12, Contracting states enjoy a "particularly wide" margin of appreciation in determining the measures necessary for Convention rights such as this one to be secured within their jurisdiction.

== Case law ==
=== Limitations on marriage found permissible ===
==== Schalk and Kopf v. Austria (2010) ====
Schalk and Kopf alleged discrimination because, being a same sex couple, they were denied the possibility to marry or to have their relationship recognised by law in Austrian domestic law. The applicants argued that civil marriage was a union of two persons encompassing all aspects of lives, and the procreation of children was no longer a decisive element to the union of marriage. They considered the reference to ‘national laws’ in Article 12 of the Convention could not mean that states were given unlimited discretion in regulating that right. The government maintained that both the clear wording of Article 12 and the Court’s case-law as it stood indicated that the right to marry was by its very nature limited to different sex couples.

The Austrian Government conceded that there has been significant social changes in the institution of marriage since the adoption of the Convention, but there was not yet any European consensus on granting same sex couples the right to marry. Having regard to Article 9 of the Charter of Fundamental Rights of the European Union, the Court no longer considered that the right to marry enshrined in Article 12 of the ECHR must in all circumstances be limited to marriage between two persons of the opposite sex.

As matters stand, the question whether or not to allow same sex marriage is to be left to regulation by the national law of the Contracting State, and no violation of Article 12 was found. The Court reasoned that the choice of the wording of Article 12 must be considered deliberate. The right was granted in the context of strictly traditional concepts of marriage and a lack of European consensus upheld the wide margin of discretion afforded to Contracting states.

==== Parry v. the United Kingdom (2006); ====
In these two cases married couples being a woman and a male to female post-operative transsexual, made a complaint to the court that under Article 12 they were required to end their marriage if the second applicant wished to obtain full legal recognition of their change of gender to female. These cases were dismissed as manifestly unfounded. Again, the Court referred to the traditional concept of marriage which Article 12 was founded in.

The Court acknowledged that a number of Contracting States had extended marriage to same sex couples but went on to say "this reflected their own vision of the role of marriage in their societies and did not flow from an interpretation of the fundamental right as laid down by the Contracting States in the Convention in 1950." It ultimately fell within the Contracting States margin of appreciation as to how to regulate the effects of the change of gender on pre-existing marriages, and consequently Article 12 had not been violated in either of these cases. R and F v. the United Kingdom (2006)

==== Rees v. the United Kingdom (1986); ====
In these cases the court found that the inability of transsexuals to marry a person of the sex opposite to their reassigned gender was not found by the Court to be in breach of Article 12. This was based on traditional concepts of marriage; the continued adoption of biological criteria in domestic law for determining a person’s sex; and, that such regulations in national laws could not be regarded as restricting the right in such a way that the very essence of the right was impaired. Cossey v. the United Kingdom (1990); Sheffield and Horsham v. the United Kingdom (1998)

==== Klip and Kruger v. Netherlands (1997) ====
Measures against marriage of convenience.

=== Limitations on marriage found impermissible ===
==== F v. Switzerland (1987) ====
Ban of marriage before three years after divorce in which the applicant was found responsible.

==== B and L v. the United Kingdom (2005) ====
Ban of marriage between a man and the former wife of his son during son's and son's mother's lifetime.

==== Draper v. the United Kingdom (1980) ====
Lack of opportunity to marry for a prisoner.

==== Christine Goodwin v. the United Kingdom (2002) ====
The Court departed from its historical reasoning against finding a breach of Article 12 of the Convention in this case. The transgender applicant argued that she and her partner could not marry because the law treated her as a man because of the biological criteria which determined gender for the purposes of marriage in domestic law. The UK Government maintained that neither Article 12 of the Convention, nor the closely related Article 8, required a state to permit a transsexual or transgender person to marry a person of his or her original sex: "if any change in this important or sensitive area were to be made, it should come from the UK’s own courts acting within the margin of appreciation which this Court has always afforded."

The Court considered the terms of Article 12 which referred to the right of a "man and a woman" to marry no longer had to be understood as determining gender by purely biological criteria. It was not persuaded to leave the matter entirely within the Contracting States' margin of appreciation, to prevent the margin extending so far as to allow the Contracting States to induce an effective bar on any exercise of the right by transsexuals. While it is for the Contracting state to determine conditions around legal gender recognition for post-operative transsexuals and its effect on existing heterosexual marriages, a transsexual should not be barred from enjoying the right to marry in any case. The court concluded that the impossibility for a post-operative transsexual to marry in her assigned gender violated Article 12 of the Convention.

== Literature ==
- Harris, David; O'Boyle, Michael; Warbrick, Colin (2009). Law of the European Convention on Human Rights (2nd ed.). New York: Oxford University Press. pp. 549–556. ISBN 978-0-406-90594-9.
- Hutchinson, Michael R. "The Margin of Appreciation Doctrine in the European Court of Human Rights", The International and Comparative Law Quarterly, Vol. 48, No. 3 (Jul., 1999), pp. 638–650.
- Johnson, Paul (2015). 'Is Article 12 of the European Convention on Human Rights applicable to same-sex couples?'. European Courts.
- Johnson, Paul and Falcetta, Silvia (2018) 'Same-Sex Marriage and Article 12 of the European Convention on Human Rights'. Research Handbook on Gender, Sexuality and the Law (Edward Elgar Publishing, Forthcoming).
- Mowbray, Alastair. "Subsidiarity and the European Convention on Human Rights", Human Rights Law Review, Vol. 15, No. 2 (Jun., 2015), pp. 313–341.
