= Property adjustment order =

Type of legal order in the United Kingdom

A Property adjustment order is a legal order in the United Kingdom. They give a "court wide powers to change or transfer ownership of property regardless of whether one spouse or civil partner is the legal owner or whether you are joint legal owners".
