= Divorce, Dissolution and Separation Act 2020 =

UK law providing for no-fault divorce

Divorce, Dissolution and Separation Act 2020 (Note: Section 9.)
- Act of Parliament
- Parliament of the United Kingdom
- Long title: An Act to make in relation to marriage and civil partnership in England and Wales provision about divorce, dissolution and separation; and for connected purposes.
- Citation: 2020 c. 11
- Introduced by: Robert Buckland, Lord High Chancellor of Great Britain (Commons); Lord Keen of Elie, Advocate General for Scotland (Lords)
- Territorial extent: England and Wales; Scotland (sections 6 to 9); Northern Ireland (sections 6 to 9); (Note: Section 7.)

Dates
- Royal assent: 25 June 2020
- Commencement: 06 April 2022 By way of future regulations after the passing of the Act
Other legislation
Amends	Matrimonial Causes Act 1973; Senior Courts Act 1981; Civil Jurisdiction and Judgments Act 1982; Civil Partnership Act 2004

Status: Current legislation

History of passage through Parliament

Records of Parliamentary debate relating to the statute from Hansard

Text of statute as originally enacted

Revised text of statute as amended

The Divorce, Dissolution and Separation Act 2020 (c. 11) is an act of the Parliament of the United Kingdom which amends existing laws relating to divorce to allow for no-fault divorce in England and Wales.

The government held that the changes were the biggest reform of England and Wales's divorce laws since the Matrimonial Causes Act 1973, and that the laws would reduce the impact that allegations of blame could have on families, as under previous law one spouse was required to make accusations about the other's conduct in order to be granted a divorce.

== Background ==
In 2018, the Supreme Court of the United Kingdom upheld a denial of a divorce petition in the case of Owens v Owens. The justices in the case were reluctant in coming to their findings and invited Parliament to reconsider the law on divorce. This led to the government announcing an intention to reform the law on divorce to remove the requirement to demonstrate irretrievable breakdown of a marriage with reference to one of the five grounds in s1 of the Matrimonial Causes Act 1973.

== Provisions ==
Section 1 of the act amended the Matrimonial Causes Act 1973 allowing for parties to apply to the court for a divorce by stating that the marriage had broken down irretrievably without apportioning blame on either party.

Section 2 of the act provides for changes to the Matrimonial Causes Act 1973 where an application of judicial separation has been made and removes the requirement for factual grounds to be provided where a judicial separation is sought.

Sections 3 to 5 makes similar changes to the Civil Partnership Act 2004 to allow for the parties to apply to the court for dissolution by way of a statement that the civil partnership has broken down irretrievably.

The act shall only apply to England and Wales.

== See also ==
- No-fault divorce
- Matrimonial Causes Act 1973
- Civil Partnership Act 2004
