= Divorce Reform Act 1969 =

Act of the Parliament of the United Kingdom

Divorce Reform Act 1969 (Note: Section 11(1).)
- Act of Parliament
- Parliament of the United Kingdom
- Long title: An Act to amend the grounds for divorce and judicial separation; to facilitate reconciliation in matrimonial causes; and for purposes connected with the matters aforesaid.
- Citation: 1969 c. 55
- Territorial extent: England and Wales (Note: Section 11(4).)

Dates
- Royal assent: 22 October 1969
- Commencement: 1 January 1971 (Note: Section 11(3).)
- Repealed: 1 January 1974 (Note: The Matrimonial Causes Act 1973 (Commencement) Order 1973 (SI 1973/1972).)
Other legislation
Amends	Matrimonial Causes Act 1965; Matrimonial Causes Act 1967
Amended by	Matrimonial Proceedings and Property Act 1970
Repealed by	Matrimonial Causes Act 1973
Relates to	Family Law Reform Act 1969

Status: Repealed

Text of statute as originally enacted

The Divorce Reform Act 1969 (c. 55) was an act of the Parliament of the United Kingdom in the United Kingdom. The act reformed the law on divorce in England and Wales by enabling couples to divorce after they had been separated for two years if they both desired a divorce, or five years if only one wanted a divorce. People could end marriages that had "irretrievably broken down" and neither partner had to prove "fault". It received royal assent on 22 October 1969 and became law when it commenced on 1 January 1971.

The law built on the Matrimonial Causes Act 1857 (20 & 21 Vict. c. 85), which allowed people to divorce without an Act of Parliament where there had been adultery and cruelty, rape, bestiality or incest, and the Matrimonial Causes Act 1937 (1 Edw. 8. & 1 Geo. 6. c. 57), which extended the eligible grounds for divorce to include cruelty, incurable insanity and desertion (of three years or more).

The act was passed only after lengthy and complex processes of negotiation, including a royal commission, discussion and eventual backing for the "irretrievable breakdown concept" amongst a group convened by the Archbishop of Canterbury, consideration by the Law Commission, and debate in Parliament.

== Subsequent developments ==
The whole act was repealed by section 54(1)(b) of, and schedule 3, to the Matrimonial Causes Act 1973, which came into force on 1 January 1974.
