= Family Law Act 1996 =

Act of the Parliament of the United Kingdom covering divorce and marriage

Family Law Act 1996 (Note: Section 67(1).)
- Act of Parliament
- Parliament of the United Kingdom
- Long title: An Act to make provision with respect to: divorce and separation; legal aid in connection with mediation in disputes relating to family matters; proceedings in cases where marriages have broken down; rights of occupation of certain domestic premises; prevention of molestation; the inclusion in certain orders under the Children Act 1989 of provisions about the occupation of a dwelling-house; the transfer of tenancies between spouses and persons who have lived together as husband and wife; and for connected purposes.
- Citation: 1996 c. 27
- Territorial extent: England and Wales (Note: Section 67(4).)

Dates
- Royal assent: 4 July 1996
- Commencement: Various (Note: Section 67(2)–(3).)
Other legislation
Amends	Land Charges Act 1972; Domestic Proceedings and Magistrates' Courts Act 1978; Magistrates' Courts Act 1980; Senior Courts Act 1981; Civil Jurisdiction and Judgments Act 1982; Housing Associations Act 1985; Courts and Legal Services Act 1990; Private International Law (Miscellaneous Provisions) Act 1995
Repeals/revokes	Matrimonial Homes Act 1983
Amended by	Land Registration Act 2002; Domestic Violence, Crime and Victims Act 2004; Mental Health Act 2007; Human Fertilisation and Embryology Act 2008; Presumption of Death Act 2013; Domestic Abuse Act 2021

Status: Amended

Text of statute as originally enacted

Revised text of statute as amended

The Family Law Act 1996 (c. 27) is an act of the Parliament of the United Kingdom governing divorce law and marriage. The law intends to modernise divorce and to shift slightly towards "no fault" divorce from the fault-based approach of the Matrimonial Causes Act 1973. The main part of the act, dealing with divorce, was not proceeded with after pilot schemes found that it did not work well.

== Contents ==
Part I of the act sets out the philosophical approach to divorce.

Part II set out a procedure for divorce which required spouses seeking divorce to attend a preliminary Information Session and to seek mediation as a first step. Part II and related sections of other parts were repealed and partially replaced by section 18 of the Children and Families Act 2014 after they were abandoned in practice in 1999.

Part III of the act concerns provision of legal aid for mediation in family law and divorce.

Part IV set out the mechanisms and principles related to family homes (in particular notices affecting land given under the Land Registration Act 2002 as amended), occupation orders, non-molestation orders and domestic violence orders and principles. Sections 30 and 31 concern the award of a statutory licence to occupy a home.

Part IVA contains provisions related to forced marriage. This was added by the Forced Marriage (Civil Protection) Act 2007.

Part V contains supplemental sections.

== Reception ==
The divorce sections of the Act received a great deal of media discussion and criticism, with some seeing the new approach to divorce as encouraging "quickie" divorces (although in practice, a fault-based divorce under the old scheme could be completed much quicker than under this Act). The political commentator Anne McElvoy welcomed the abandonment of the Act's divorce sections seeing the extensive waiting periods and required mediation as an intrusive compromise between a proper "no fault" divorce system and the needs of "family fundamentalists".

== Related developments ==
Following the decision by the UK Supreme Court in Owens v Owens, in February 2019 Justice Secretary David Gauke said that he would introduce legislation enacting no-fault divorce in the next session of Parliament.

== See also ==
- English land law
- English property law
- English family law
- Children Act 1989
