= D v D =

D v D [2001] 1 FLR 495 was a Court of Appeal case determining the criteria necessary in disputes regarding residence in the United Kingdom. The father was granted shared residence. It was held amongst other things that costs will not normally be ordered in a contact and residence case unless the non-resident parent has behaved extraordinarily unreasonably. It is perfectly normal and proper for an NRP to seek that the children should seek to spend time with their father.

A more recent shared residence case concerning parental hostility is A Father and a Mother v Their Two Children (B and C) (2004) EWHC 142 FAM.
