= Family Procedure Rules =

The Family Procedure Rules (previously Family Proceedings Rules), often abbreviated FPR, govern the procedures used in family courts in England and Wales. The Family Procedure Rules 2010 were introduced by Statutory Instrument and are effective 6 April 2011.

Part 7 (Paragraph 75) of the Courts Act 2003 states that "Family Procedure Rules are to be made by a committee known as the Family Procedure Rule Committee", and specifies who should be on that committee. The Courts Act also states, "Family Procedure Rules may modify the rules of evidence as they apply to family proceedings in any court within the scope of the rules".

The Family Procedure Rules 2010 are split into 36 parts, together with the Practice Directions, certain Pre Action Protocols and a complete set of Forms. They are intended to modernise and standardise family court practice across the High Court, County Court and Magistrates’ Court.
