= Matrimonial Causes Act 1973 =

Act of the Parliament of the United Kingdom

Matrimonial Causes Act 1973 (Note: Section 55(1).)
- Act of Parliament
- Parliament of the United Kingdom
- Long title: An Act to consolidate certain enactments relating to matrimonial proceedings, maintenance agreements, and declarations of legitimacy, validity of marriage and British nationality, with amendments to give effect to recommendations of the Law Commission.
- Citation: 1973 c. 18
- Territorial extent: England and Wales (Note: Section 55(3).)

Dates
- Royal assent: 23 May 1973
- Commencement: 1 January 1974 (Note: Section 55(2). The Matrimonial Causes Act 1973 (Commencement) Order 1973 (SI 1973/1972).)
Other legislation
| Amends | Attachment of Earnings Act 1971; See § Repealed enactments |
| Repeals/revokes | See § Repealed enactments |
| Amended by | Domicile and Matrimonial Proceedings Act 1973; Inheritance (Provision for Family and Dependants) Act 1975; Statute Law (Repeals) Act 1977; Administration of Justice Act 1977; Domestic Proceedings and Magistrates' Courts Act 1978; Child Care Act 1980; Senior Courts Act 1981; Family Law Reform Act 1987; Private International Law (Miscellaneous Provisions) Act 1995; Divorce (Religious Marriages) Act 2002; Mental Capacity Act 2005; Presumption of Death Act 2013; Marriage (Same Sex Couples) Act 2013; Divorce, Dissolution and Separation Act 2020; Marriage and Civil Partnership (Minimum Age) Act 2022 |

Status: Amended

Text of statute as originally enacted

Revised text of statute as amended

Text of the Matrimonial Causes Act 1973 as in force today (including any amendments) within the United Kingdom, from legislation.gov.uk.

The Matrimonial Causes Act 1973 (c. 18) is an act of the Parliament of the United Kingdom governing divorce law and marriage in England and Wales.

== Provisions ==
The act contains four parts:

1. Divorce, Nullity and Other Matrimonial Suits
2. Financial Relief for Parties to Marriage and Children of Family
3. Protection, Custody, etc., of Children
4. Miscellaneous and Supplemental

Section 1 sets out the grounds that must be demonstrated before a divorce can be granted. These five grounds were adultery, behaving "in such a way that the petitioner cannot reasonably be expected to live", desertion for two years, two years of separation with the consent of the parties, or five years of separation. Following the decision of the Supreme Court of the United Kingdom in Owens v Owens, Parliament passed the Divorce, Dissolution and Separation Act 2020, which has removed these conditions.

Section 13 provides for certain restrictions in regard to the possibility of annulling voidable marriages, including where the petitioner knew of the "defect" and of the possibility of annulment, but induced the respondent to believe that s/he would not seek an annulment; or where it would be "unjust" to the respondent to grant the decree of nullity. There is usually a time limit of three years from the date of the marriage in order to institute the proceedings.

Under section 24(1), when granting a divorce, decree of nullity of marriage or judicial separation the court can order (subject to restrictions in ss 29(1) and (3) relating to children of the age of majority other than those still in school or in other special circumstances):

(a) the transfer of property between the parties, or to a child, or for the benefit of a child
(b) the settlement of property for the partner and children
(c) the variation of any ante-nuptial or post-nuptial settlement other than a pension
(d) the extinguishment or reduction of the interest of the parties to any settlement other than a pension

Under s. 24(2), the court can make an order under s. 24(1)(c) even if there are no children, and under s. 24(3) orders and settlements take effect only when the divorce or nullity of marriage is made absolute.

=== Repealed enactments ===
Section 54(1)(b) of the act repealed 14 enactments, listed in schedule 3 to the act.

| Citation | Short title | Extent of repeal |
|---|---|---|
| 1965 c. 72 | Matrimonial Causes Act 1965 | The whole act, except: section 8(2); sections 26 to 28A and section 25(4) and (5) as applied by section 28(2); section 42; in section 43(1) the words from "but a husband" to the end of the subsection; in section 46, subsection (1) and in subsection (4) the words from "this Act does not" to the end of the subsection. |
| 1967 c. 56 | Matrimonial Causes Act 1967 | Sections 7 and 8. |
| 1967 c. 80 | Criminal Justice Act 1967 | In Part I of Schedule 3, the entry relating to section 36(6) of the Matrimonial Causes Act 1965. |
| 1968 c. 63 | Domestic and Appellate Proceedings (Restriction of Publicity) Act 1968 | Sections 2(2) and 3(4). |
| 1969 c. 55 | Divorce Reform Act 1969 | The whole act. |
| 1970 c. 31 | Administration of Justice Act 1970 | In Schedule 1, the paragraphs relating respectively to proceedings for a declaration, to proceedings under section 17 of the Married Women's Property Act 1882, and to proceedings under section 1 of the Matrimonial Homes Act 1967. |
| 1970 c. 31 | Administration of Justice Act 1970 | In Schedule 2, paragraph 27. |
| 1970 c. 33 | Law Reform (Miscellaneous Provisions) Act 1970 | Section 4. |
| 1970 c. 42 | Local Authority Social Services Act 1970 | In Schedule 1, the entry relating to section 37 of the Matrimonial Causes Act 1965. |
| 1970 c. 45 | Matrimonial Proceedings and Property Act 1970 | The whole of Part I. |
| 1970 c. 45 | Matrimonial Proceedings and Property Act 1970 | Sections 34, 35, 40, 41 and 42. |
| 1970 c. 45 | Matrimonial Proceedings and Property Act 1970 | In section 43, subsection (2) and, in subsection (4), the words from the beginning to "of this Act". |
| 1970 c. 45 | Matrimonial Proceedings and Property Act 1970 | The Schedules. |
| 1971 c. 3 | Guardianship of Minors Act 1971 | In Schedule 1, in the entry relating to section 16(2) of the Maintenance Orders Act 1950, the words from "and" to "1971'". |
| 1971 c. 23 | Courts Act 1971 | Section 45(7). |
| 1971 c. 23 | Courts Act 1971 | In Schedule 8, paragraph 47. |
| 1971 c. 44 | Nullity of Marriage Act 1971 | The whole act. |
| 1972 c. 38 | Matrimonial Proceedings (Polygamous Marriages) Act 1972 | Sections 1 and 4. |
| 1972 c. 70 | Local Government Act 1972 | In Schedule 23, paragraph 13. |

== See also ==
- Ahkter v Khan
- English land law
- English property law
