= Marriage in England and Wales =

United Kingdom legislation

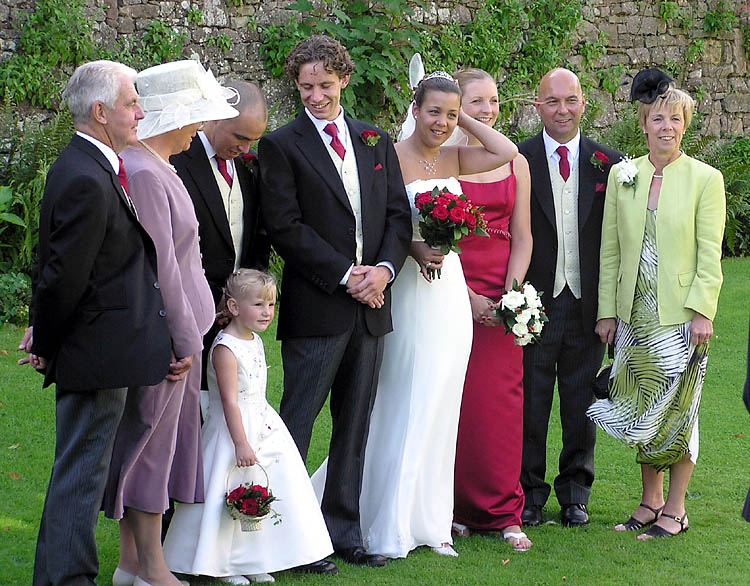
Lining up for a traditional wedding photograph

Marriage is available in England and Wales to both opposite-sex and same-sex couples and is legally recognised in the forms of both civil and religious marriage. Marriage laws have historically evolved separately from marriage laws in other jurisdictions in the United Kingdom. There is a distinction between religious marriages, conducted by an authorised religious celebrant, and civil marriages, conducted by a state registrar. The legal minimum age to enter into a marriage in England and Wales has been 18 since 27 February 2023. Previously the minimum age of marriage was 16, with parental permission (Age of Marriage Act 1929). This also applies to civil partnerships.

Certain relatives are not allowed to marry. For foreign nationals, there are also residency conditions that have to be met before people can be married. Same-sex marriage was introduced under the Marriage (Same Sex Couples) Act in March 2014.

The law regarding weddings in England and Wales was reviewed by the Law Commission. In July 2022, the Commission released its final report finding these laws confusing and outdated, and calling for a complete revision. The Commission noted, "the recommendations represent a comprehensive overhaul to current weddings law, the key parts of which date back to 1836 or even earlier."

Matters regarding divorce are resolved under English family law through the Family Justice System of England and Wales.

== Marriage procedures ==
Wedding ceremonies can either be conducted by "authorised celebrants" (sometimes, but not always, a minister of religion) or by an "authorised registrar". To be legally binding, they must take place with at least two other competent people present as witnesses. The marriage register is signed by the couple, the celebrant and two witnesses. Civil marriages may not take place in religious venues, but since the Marriage Act 1994 may take place in other licensed venues.

Priests of the Church of England and the Church in Wales are legally required to marry people of the opposite sex, providing one of them is from the local parish, regardless of whether the couple are practising. Special permission may be granted for out-of-parish weddings. Since the Church of England Marriage Measure 2008 and Marriage (Wales) Act 2010, the right to marry in a church was extended to churches that their parents or grandparents were married in or if they were baptised or confirmed in it. Church of England and Church in Wales priests are not permitted to conduct same-sex marriages. However, the Church in Wales has the power to require the Lord Chancellor to change the law to permit them to do so and has approved a liturgy for their blessing.

For civil marriages, notices must be posted for 28 clear days, at the appropriate register office. Church of England marriages require the banns to be read out three times at the appropriate church or churches unless a Special Licence has been obtained. In most cases, the appropriate churches will be the parish churches where the parties reside and the one where the ceremony is to take place.

A marriage solemnized between persons either of whom is under the age of sixteen is void. This disability may be referred to as "nonage".

=== Law Commission review ===
In 2022, the Law Commission released its report on the state of the laws regarding weddings in England and Wales. The Commission found there was a disconnect between what couples find meaningful and the bureaucratic formalities of the law and that the law in this area is confusing, complex, inconsistent, and unfair. The government published Marriage Law Reform proposals in July 2026, giving the wedding industry the opportunity to understand the full commercial implications for the first time.

=== Divorce ===
From 6 April 2022 law pertaining to divorce changed with the arrival of no fault divorce for marriages and no fault dissolution for civil partnerships. This is a major change in the divorce/dissolution procedure from the grounds that were required to be proven under previous Matrimonial Causes Act 1973 legislation, which could be acrimonious as one party had to prove that the marriage had irretrievably broken down. Grounds for this were one or more of the five possible facts:

- Adultery
- Unreasonable behaviour
- Desertion (two years)
- Separation, agreed divorce (two years)
- Separation, contested divorce (five years)

With the Divorce, Dissolution and Separation Act 2020 no fault divorces are possible; the only thing that has to be stated is: "the irretrievable breakdown of the relationship". Therefore there is only one simple requirement which is the statement of irretrievable breakdown; there is no defence to such no fault divorce/dissolution. The other key change in this procedure is that there is no ability for one party to contest or defend a divorce or dissolution application, apart from couple of very limited grounds. Civil remarriage is allowed. Religions and denominations differ on whether they permit religious remarriage.

== Benefits and consequences ==
Upon death of one's spouse, bequests to the other spouse do not incur inheritance tax. Intestate property by default will go to the spouse. Also, there is partial inheritance of pensions.

In courts, one spouse may not be compelled to testify against the other. Non-British spouses of British citizens may obtain residence permits if the British spouse meets a minimum income requirement of £18,600 per year. This rises to £22,400 for families with a child, and a further £2,400 for each further child. Spouses are considered to have a duty of care towards each other, and certain social security benefits are calculated differently from those for single people.

=== Foreign citizens wishing to marry in the UK ===
From 1 February 2005, visitors who wish to be married in the UK that are a citizen of a country that is not a member of the European Economic Area (EEA), must apply for a visa before they travel. Without the visa, the registrar will not be able to accept the notice of marriage and will not be able to perform the marriage ceremony.

If one of the people wanting to marry is subject to immigration control, notice of marriage can only be done at a designated register office, which both parties must attend together. Marriage must be between two people neither of whom is in a Civil Partnership or separate marriage (foreign divorces are generally recognised; but an existing foreign marriage would prevent a marriage in the UK as this would be treated as bigamy).

== History ==
=== Medieval period ===
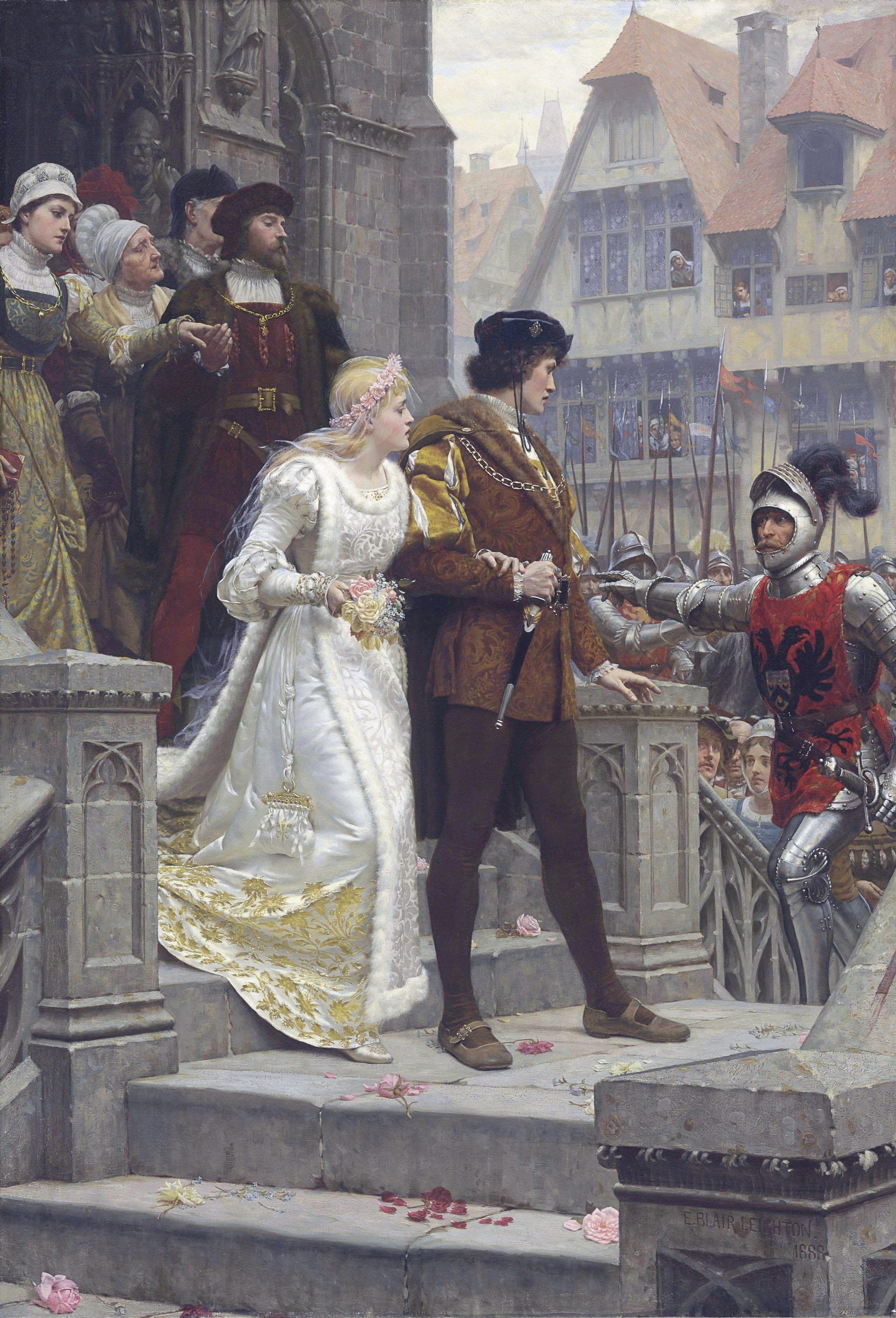
An idealised medieval wedding imagined by Edmund Leighton (Call to Arms 1888)

In medieval Europe, marriage was governed by canon law, which recognised as valid only those marriages where the parties stated they took one another as husband and wife, regardless of the presence or absence of witnesses. It was not necessary, therefore, to be married by any official or cleric. The Fourth Lateran Council (1215) forbade clandestine marriage, and required marriages to be publicly announced in churches by priests.

From about the 12th to the 17th century, the practice of "handfasting" was widespread in England. It was a term for "engagement to be married", or a ceremony held on the occasion of such a contract, usually about a month prior to a church wedding, at which the marrying couple formally declared that each accepted the other as spouse.

Handfasting was legally binding: as soon as the couple made their vows to each other they were validly married. It was not a temporary arrangement. Just as with church weddings of the period, the union which handfasting created could only be dissolved by death. English legal authorities held that, even if not followed by intercourse, handfasting was as binding as any vow taken in church before a priest.

During handfasting the man and woman in turn would take the other by the right hand and declare aloud that they there and then accepted each other as man and wife. The words might vary but traditionally consisted of a simple formula such as "I (Name) take thee (Name) to my wedded husband/wife, till death us depart, and thereto I plight thee my troth". Because of this, handfasting was also known in England as "troth-plight". Gifts were often exchanged, especially rings: a gold coin broken in half between the couple was also common. Other tokens recorded include gloves, a crimson ribbon tied in a knot, and even a silver toothpick. Handfasting might take place anywhere, indoors or out. It was frequently in the home of the bride, but according to records handfastings also took place in taverns, in an orchard and even on horseback. The presence of a credible witness or witnesses was usual.

For much of the relevant period church courts dealt with marital matters. Ecclesiastical law recognised two forms of handfasting, sponsalia per verba de praesenti ("espousal by word given at the present time") and sponsalia per verba de futuro ("espousal by word at a future time"). In the former – the most common form – the couple declared they there and then accepted each other as man and wife; the latter form was a betrothal, as the couple took hands only to declare their intention to marry each other at some future date and could be ended with the consent of both parties – but only if the relationship was unconsummated. If intercourse did take place, then the sponsalia de futuro "was automatically converted into de iure marriage".

In the sixteenth century, the Council of Trent legislated more specific marriage requirements, such as the presence of a priest and two witnesses, as well as promulgation of the marriage announcement thirty days prior to the ceremony. These laws did not extend to the regions affected by the Protestant Reformation. Despite the validity of handfasting it was expected to be solemnised by a church wedding fairly soon afterwards. Penalties might follow for those who did not comply. Ideally the couple were also supposed to refrain from intercourse until then. Complaints by preachers suggest that they often did not wait, but at least until the early 1600s the common attitude to this kind of anticipatory behaviour seems to have been lenient. Handfasting remained an acceptable way of marrying in England throughout the Middle Ages but declined in the early modern period. In some circumstances handfasting was open to abuse, with persons who had undergone "troth-plight" occasionally refusing to proceed to a church wedding, creating ambiguity about their former betrothed's marital status.

William Shakespeare negotiated and witnessed a handfasting in 1604, and was called as a witness in a suit about the dowry in 1612 and historians speculate that his own marriage to Anne Hathaway was so conducted when he was a young man in 1582, as the practice still had credence in Warwickshire at the time.

=== 17th to 19th centuries ===
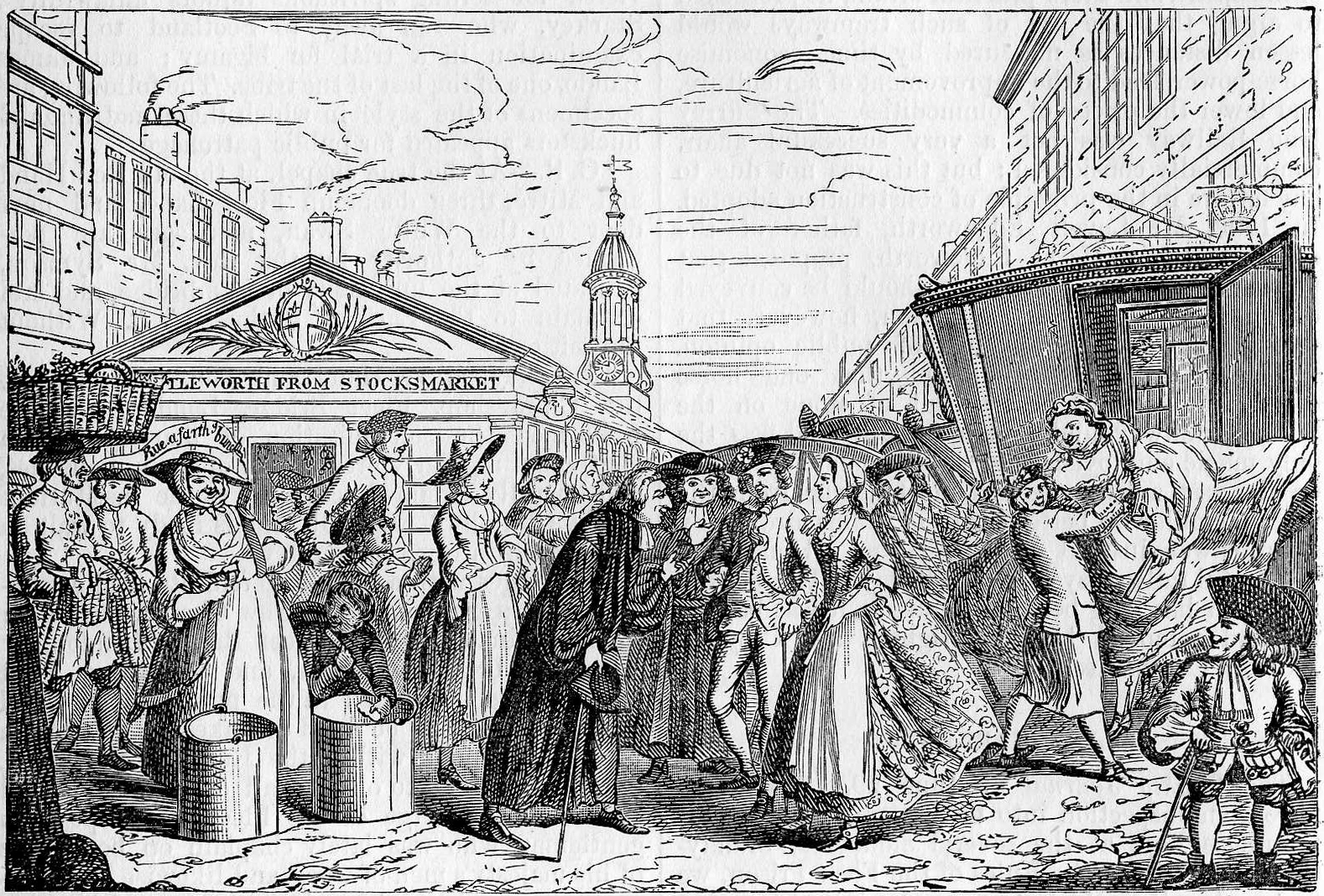
Caricature of a clandestine Fleet Marriage, taking place in England before the Marriage Act 1753

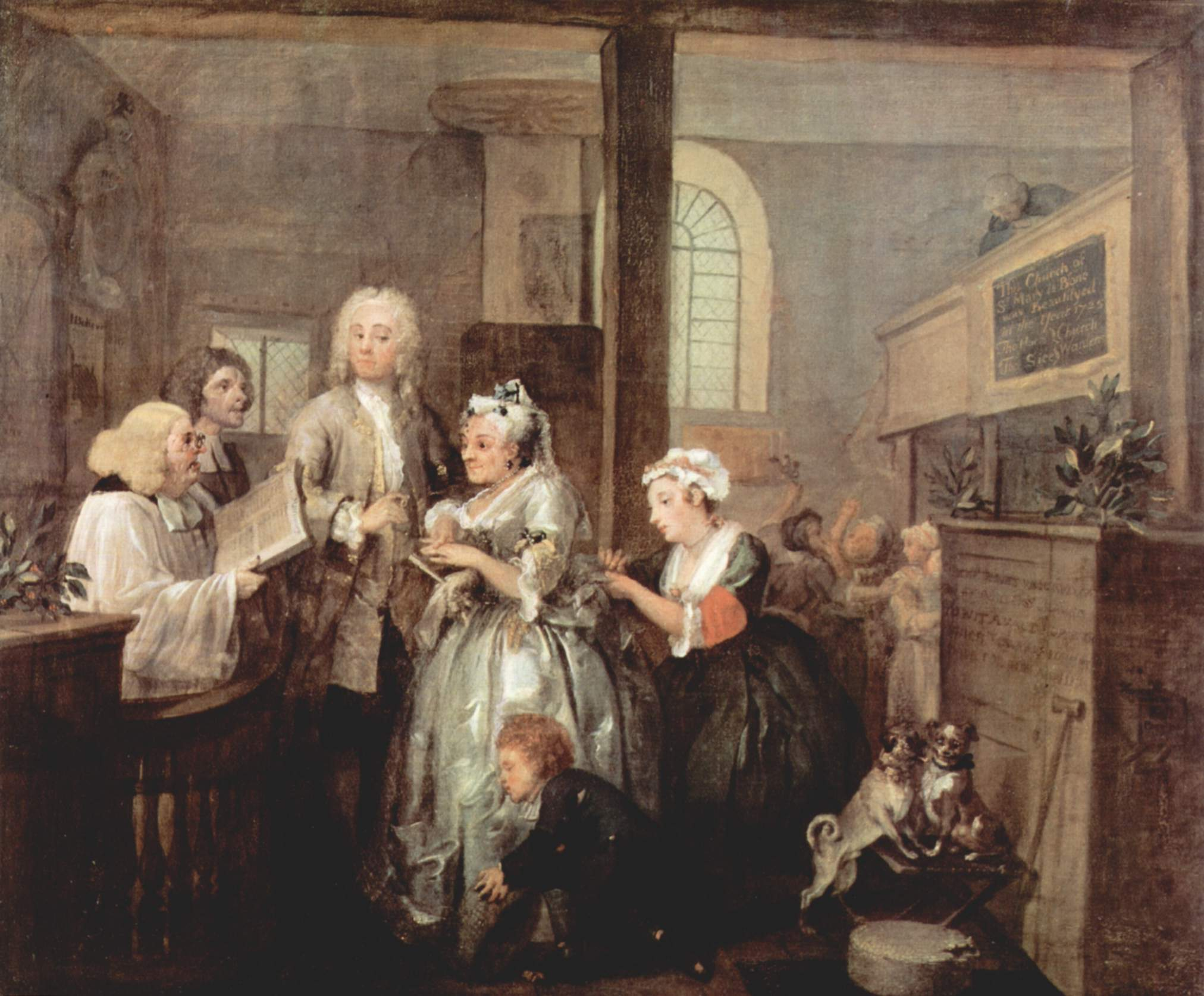
William Hogarth's A Rake's Progress depicting a wedding in the 18th century

After the beginning of the 17th century, gradual changes in English law meant the presence of an officiating priest or magistrate became necessary for a marriage to be lawful. Up until this point in England, clergy performed many clandestine marriages, such as so-called fleet marriage, which were held legally valid; and in Scotland, unsolemnised common-law marriage was still valid.

The Marriage Duty Act 1694 and the Marriage Duty Act 1695 required that banns or marriage licences must be obtained. The Marriage Act 1753 also laid down rules for where marriages were allowed to take place, whom you were and were not allowed to marry, the requirement for at least two witnesses to be present at the marriage ceremony and set a minimum marriageable age. This led to the practice of couples who could not meet the conditions in England and Wales eloping to Scotland.

Legal common-law marriage was, for practical purposes, abolished under the Marriage Act 1753 (26 Geo. 2. c. 33), also known as Lord Hardwicke's Marriage Act. This was aimed at suppressing clandestine marriages by introducing more stringent conditions for validity, and thereafter only marriages conducted by the Church of England, Quakers, or under Jewish law, were recognised in England and Wales. This effectively ended earlier practices. Any other form of marriage was abolished; children born into unions which were not valid under the Act would not automatically inherit the property or titles of their parents. For historical reasons, the act did not apply in Scotland.

The Marriage Act 1836 (6 & 7 Will. 4. c. 85) re-introduced civil marriage, and also allowed ministers of other faiths (Nonconformists and Roman Catholics) to act as registrars. This act was contemptuously referred to as the "Broomstick Marriage Act" (a phrase which referred to a custom in supposed "sham marriages") by those who felt that a marriage outside the Anglican church did not deserve legal recognition.

The bill also proscribed certain affinities, such as the marriage of a man to his deceased wife's sister. Until this point, affinities had been largely formalised by those laid out in the "Table of kindred and affinity" in the Anglican (Church of England) Book of Common Prayer.

=== 20th century ===
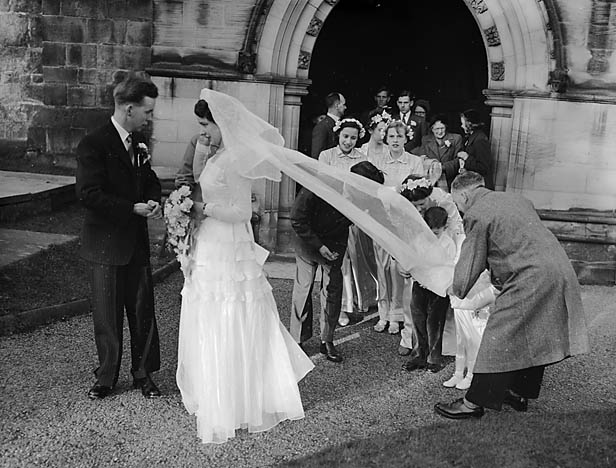
Church wedding at Oswestry, England, in January 1954

The list of proscribed affinities was reduced in the early twentieth century by the Deceased Wife's Sister's Marriage Act 1907 (7 Edw. 7. c. 47), and by subsequent amendments (the Deceased Brother's Widow's Marriage Act 1921 (11 & 12 Geo. 5. c. 24) and the Marriage (Prohibited Degrees of Relationship) Act 1931 (21 & 22 Geo. 5. c. 31)).

The Age of Marriage Act 1929 (19 & 20 Geo. 5. c. 36) increased the age of marriage to sixteen with consent of parents or guardians and 21 without that consent. It was passed in response to a campaign by the National Union of Societies for Equal Citizenship. Until this point, at common law and by canon law a person who had attained the legal age of puberty could contract a valid marriage. A marriage contracted by persons either of whom was under the legal age of puberty was voidable. The legal age of was fourteen years for males and twelve years for females. This section amended the law so that a marriage contracted by persons either of whom was under the age of sixteen years was void.

The Marriage Act 1949 (12, 13 & 14 Geo. 6. c. 76) prohibited solemnizing marriages during evenings and at night; since the Marriage Act 1836 (6 & 7 Will. 4. c. 85) it had been forbidden to marry between the hours of six in the evening and eight in the morning. This prohibition was repealed on 1 October 2012.

The Family Law Reform Act 1987 made revisions to the 1949 act, which had the effect of reducing the age of marriage without parental consent to 18.

The Marriage Act 1994 was originally introduced as a private member's bill by Gyles Brandreth and allowed marriages to be solemnized in certain "approved premises"; prior to the act, marriage ceremonies could only be conducted in churches and register offices.

=== 21st century ===
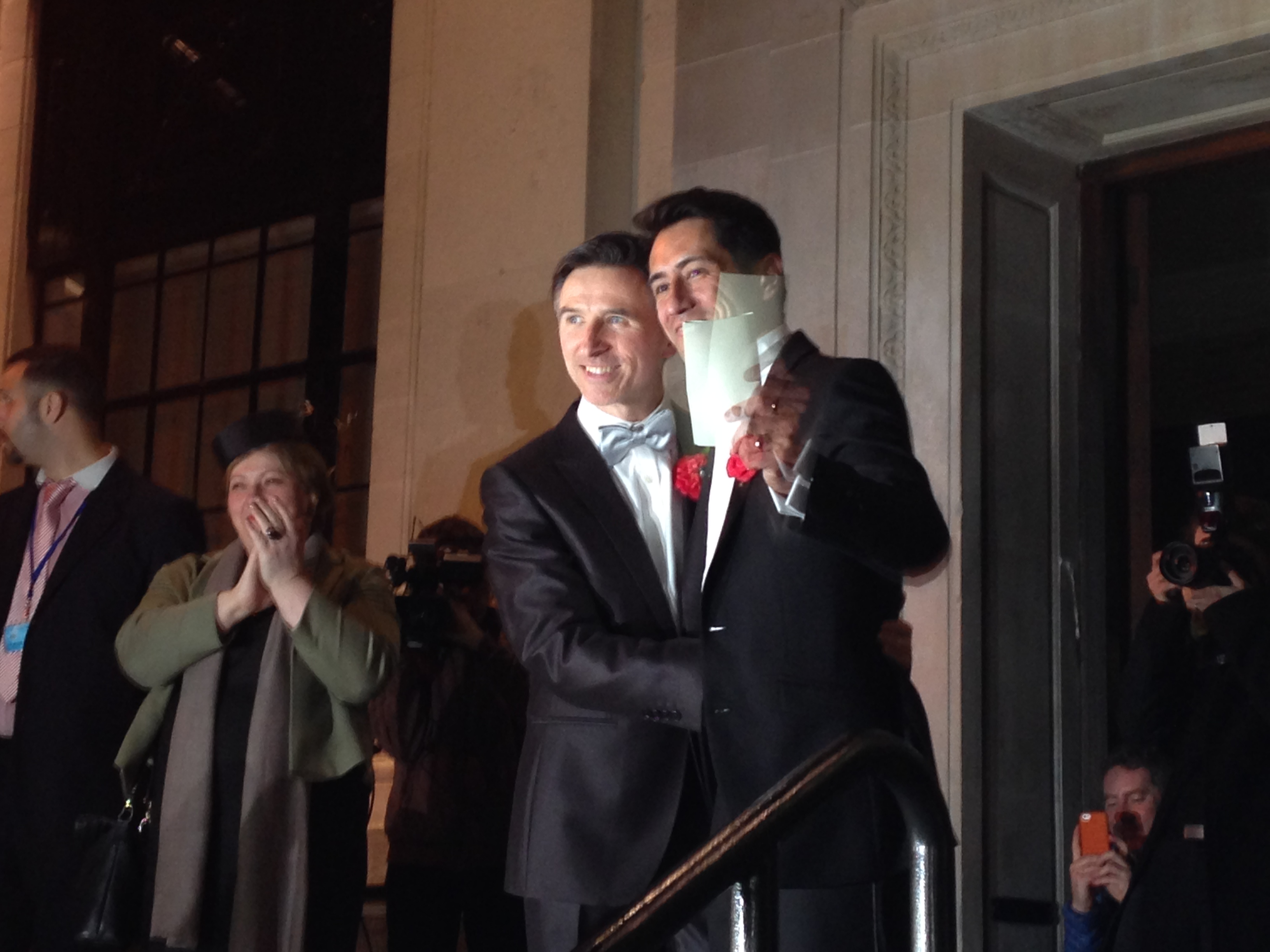
A same-sex marriage in Islington, London on 29 March 2014, the first day they were permitted in England and Wales.

In 2013, Parliament passed the Marriage (Same Sex Couples) Act 2013 (c. 30), introducing same-sex marriage in England and Wales. Same-sex weddings began on 29 March 2014; however, the provisions of the act came into force on 13 March 2014, meaning that existing same-sex marriages performed abroad were recognised from that date. Prior to this, civil partnerships had been made available to same-sex couples in the United Kingdom in 2005, granting rights and responsibilities virtually identical to civil marriage.

Marriage and Civil Partnership (Minimum Age) Act 2022 (Note: Section 9.)
- Act of Parliament
- Parliament of the United Kingdom
- Long title: An Act to make provision about the minimum age for marriage and civil partnership; and for connected purposes.
- Citation: 2022 c. 28
- Territorial extent: England and Wales; Scotland (sections 4(3) and 5–9); Northern Ireland (sections 4(3) and 5–9)

Dates
- Royal assent: 28 April 2022
- Commencement: 27 February 2023 (Note: Section 7. The Marriage and Civil Partnership (Minimum Age) Act 2022 (Commencement and Transitional Provisions) Regulations 2023 (SI 2023/88).)
Other legislation
Amends	Marriage Act 1949; Marriage (Registrar General’s Licence) Act 1970; Matrimonial Causes Act 1973; Civil Partnership Act 2004; Anti-social Behaviour, Crime and Policing Act 2014

Status: Current legislation

History of passage through Parliament

Text of statute as originally enacted

Revised text of statute as amended

On 27 February 2023, the minimum age at which a person can marry was increased to eighteen years by the Marriage and Civil Partnership (Minimum Age) Act 2022 (c. 28). The act also creates provisions to make it an offence to cause a person under 18 to enter into a religious or civil ceremony, even if not legally binding (such as forced arranged marriages).

=== Royal marriages ===
Marriages of members of the royal family were formerly regulated by the Royal Marriages Act 1772 (12 Geo. 3. c. 11), which made it illegal for any member of the British royal family (defined as all descendants of King George II, excluding descendants of princesses who marry into "foreign families") under the age of 25 to marry without the consent of the ruling monarch. Any member of the royal family over the age of 25 who had been refused the sovereign's consent could marry one year after giving notice to the Privy Council of their intention to so marry, unless Parliament voted against the marriage in the interim.

The Succession to the Crown Act 2013 (c. 20), which came into effect in 2015, repealed the Royal Marriages Act 1772 and stated that a person who is one of the first six people in the line of succession to the throne requires the monarch's consent to marry. But if permission is refused then they may still marry and the only consequence is that the person and their descendants of the marriage are disqualified from succeeding to the Crown.

In 2002, the Church of England's General Synod changed the church's remarriage policy shortly before then-Prince Charles was set to marry divorcee Camilla Parker Bowles. In 2005, the Queen consented formally to the wedding of Charles, Prince of Wales and Camilla Parker Bowles.

The royal family was specifically excluded from the Marriage Act 1836 (6 & 7 Will. 4. c. 85), which instituted civil marriages in England. However, Prince Charles's civil marriage raised questions. Lord Falconer of Thoroton told the House of Lords that the 1836 act had been repealed by the Marriage Act 1949 (12, 13 & 14 Geo. 6. c. 76), which had different wording, and that the British Government was satisfied that it was lawful for the couple to marry by a civil ceremony in accordance with part III of the 1949 act, and the Registrar General, Len Cook determined that a civil marriage would in fact be valid. Any doubt as to the interpretation of the Marriage Act 1949 was put to rest by the Human Rights Act 1998, which requires that legislation be interpreted in conformity with convention rights wherever possible (including the right to marry, without discrimination).

== Statistics ==
=== Number of marriages ===
Number of marriages by year, England and Wales since 1838
Year	Number of marriages
1838	111,481
1839	121,083
1840	124,329
1841	122,482
1841	122,496
1842	118,825
1843	123,818
1844	132,249
1845	143,743
1846	145,664
1847	135,845
1848	138,230
1849	141,883
1850	152,744
1851	154,206
1852	158,782
1853	164,520
1854	159,727
1855	152,113
1856	159,337
1857	159,097
1858	156,070
1859	167,723
1860	170,156
1861	163,706
1862	164,030
1863	173,510
1864	180,387
1865	185,474
1866	187,776
1867	179,154
1868	176,962
1869	176,970
1870	181,655
1871	190,112
1872	201,267
1873	205,615
1874	202,010
1875	201,212
1876	201,874
1877	194,352
1878	190,054
1879	182,082
1880	191,965
1881	197,290
1882	204,405
1883	206,384
1884	204,301
1885	197,745
1886	196,071
1887	200,518
1888	203,821
1889	213,865
1890	223,028
1891	226,526
1892	227,135
1893	218,689
1894	226,449
1895	228,204
1896	242,764
1897	249,145
1898	255,379
1899	262,334
1900	257,480
1901	259,400
1902	261,750
1903	261,103
1904	257,856
1905	260,742
1906	270,038
1907	276,421
1908	264,940
1909	260,544
1910	267,721
1911	274,943
1912	283,834
1913	286,583
1914	294,401
1919	369,411
1924	296,416
1929	313,316
1934	342,307
1952	349,308
1957	346,903
1962	347,732
1963	351,329
1964	359,307
1965	371,127
1966	384,497
1967	386,052
1968	407,822
1969	396,746
1970	415,487
1971	404,737
1972	426,241
1973	400,435
1974	384,389
1975	380,620
1976	358,567
1977	356,954
1978	368,258
1979	368,853
1980	370,022
1981	351,973
1982	342,166
1983	344,334
1984	349,186
1985	346,389
1986	347,924
1987	351,761
1988	348,492
1989	346,697
1990	331,150
1991	306,756
1992	311,564
1993	299,197
1994	291,069
1995	283,012
1996	278,975
1997	272,536
1998	267,303
1999	263,515
2000	267,961
2001	249,227
2002	255,596
2003	270,109
2004	273,069
2005	247,805
2006	239,454
2007	235,367
2008	235,794
2009	232,443
2010	243,808
2011	249,133
2012	263,640
2013	240,854
2014	252,222
2015	245,513
2016	249,793
2017	242,842
2018	234,795
2019	219,850
2020	85,770
2021	207,708
2022	246,897

Statistics on marriage (in England and Wales if not specified)

Total number of marriages over time in the United Kingdom

Opposite sex marriage rates in England and Wales over time

Marriage rates in age groups for men

Marriage rates in age groups for women

Median age of marriage for all men and women

Median age of marriage for people of no previous marriage status

Percentage of men who have ever been married by birth year

Percentage of women who have ever been married by birth year

== See also ==
- Civil Partnership
- Fleet Marriage
- History of marriage in Great Britain and Ireland
- Marriage Certificate
- Marriage in Northern Ireland
- Marriage in Scotland

== Sources ==
- Anton, A. E. "'Handfasting' in Scotland." The Scottish Historical Review 37, no. 124 (October 1958): 89–102.
- Gregory, D. History of the Western Highlands and Isles of Scotland (1881).
- Martin, Martin, A Description of the Western Islands of Scotland (1693) 1st Edition, (1716) 2nd Edition.
- Nicholl, Charles, The Lodger:Shakespeare on Silver Street (2007) 1st edition; Chapter 27, "A handfasting".
- Nicolson, Alexander, History of Skye MacLean Press, 60 Aird Bhearnasdail, by Portree, Isle of Skye (1930) pp. 73, 86, and 120.
- Rebecca Probert, Marriage Law and Practice in the Long Eighteenth Century: A Reassessment (Cambridge: Cambridge University Press, 2009)
