= Marriage Act =

Stock short title used for legislation

Marriage Act may refer to a number of pieces of legislation:

== Australia ==
- Marriage Act 1961, Australia's law that governs legal marriage.
- Marriage Amendment (Definition and Religious Freedoms) Act 2017

== Canada ==
- Civil Marriage Act passed in Canada explicitly permitting same-sex marriages.

== Hong Kong ==
- Marriage Ordinance 1875
- Marriage Reform Ordinance 1970

== India ==
- Special Marriage Act, 1954
- Hindu Marriage Act, 1955

== New Zealand ==
- Marriage Act 1854, an early law in the colony governing marriage
- Marriage Act 1955, the current Act
- Marriage (Definition of Marriage) Amendment Act 2013

== South Africa ==
- Prohibition of Mixed Marriages Act, 1949, outlawing marriages between Whites and non-Whites
- Marriage Act, 1961, and its amending acts:
  - Marriage Amendment Act, 1964
  - Marriage Amendment Act, 1968
  - Marriage Amendment Act, 1970
  - Marriage Amendment Act, 1972
  - Marriage Amendment Act, 1973
  - Marriage Amendment Act, 1981
- Immorality and Prohibition of Mixed Marriages Amendment Act, 1985, repealing the 1949 prohibition
- Recognition of Customary Marriages Act, 1998, which recognised marriages under African customary law
- Civil Union Act, 2006, which extended marriage to same-sex couples

== United Kingdom ==
- Royal Marriages Act 1772 (12 Geo. 3. c. 11) (E & W & S)
- Deceased Wife's Sister's Marriage Act 1907 (7 Edw. 7. c. 47) (UK)

Extent unknown by author:

- Marriage Act 1811 or the Marriage of Lunatics Act 1811 (51 Geo. 3. c. 37) (the second short title was conferred by the Short Titles Act 1896, s.1 & first Sch.)
- Marriage Act 1823 (4 Geo. 4. c. 76) (short title: 1896 Act, s.1)
- Marriage Act 1824 (5 Geo. 4. c. 32) (short title: 1896 Act, s.1)
- Marriage Act 1835 (5 & 6 Will. 4. c. 54) (short title: 1896 Act, s.1)
- Marriage Act 1836 (6 & 7 Will. 4. c. 85) (short title: 1896 Act, s.1)
- Births and Deaths Registration Act 1837 (7 Will. 4 & 1 Vict. c. 22) (short title: 1896 Act, s.1)
- Marriage Act 1840 (3 & 4 Vict. c. 72) (short title: 1896 Act, s.1)
- Marriage (Society of Friends) Act 1860 (23 & 24 Vict. c. 18) (short title: 1896 Act, s.1)
- Marriage Confirmation Act 1860 (23 & 24 Vict. c. 24) (short title: 1896 Act, s.1)
- Infant Marriage Act 1860 (23 & 24 Vict. c. 83) (short title: 1896 Act, s.1)
- Marriage (Society of Friends) Act 1872 (35 & 36 Vict. c. 10) (short title: 1896 Act, s.1)
- Greek Marriages Act 1884 (47 & 48 Vict. c. 20)
- Marriages Validity Act 1886 (49 & 50 Vict. c. 3)
- Marriages Act 1886 (49 & 50 Vict. c. 14)

The Marriage Acts 1811 to 1886 means the Marriage Act 1811, the Marriage Act 1823, the Marriage Act 1824, the Marriage Confirmation Act 1830, the Marriage Act 1835, the Marriage Act 1836, the Births and Deaths Registration Act 1837, the Marriage Act 1840, the Marriage and Registration Act 1856, the Marriage (Society of Friends) Act 1860, the Marriage Confirmation Act 1860, the Marriage (Society of Friends) Act 1872, the Greek Marriages Act 1884, the Marriages Validity Act 1886 and the Marriages Act 1886.

The Marriage Acts 1811 to 1929 was the collective title of the Marriage Acts 1811 to 1898 and the Age of Marriage Act 1929 so far as it related to England.

=== England and Wales ===
- French Queen's Jointure (on Marriage to Duke of Suffolk) Act 1515 (7 Hen. 8. c. 8)
- Six Clerks in Chancery Act 1523 (14 & 15 Hen. 8. c. 8)
- Succession to the Crown (Marriage) Act 1536 (28 Hen. 8. c. 7)
- Marriage of Richard Devereux Act 1536 (28 Hen. 8. c. 37)
- Marriage of Lord Bulbeck Act 1536 (28 Hen. 8. c. 48)
- Marriage Act 1540 (32 Hen. 8. c. 38)
- Clergy Marriage Act 1548 (2 & 3 Edw. 6. c. 21)
- Marriages (Pre-contract) Act 1548 (2 & 3 Edw. 6. c. 23) (repealed by the Marriage Act 1949, s.79 & fifth Sch., Pt.I)
- Clergy Marriage Act 1551 (5 & 6 Edw. 6. c. 12)
- Queen Mary's Marriage Act 1554 (1 Mar. Sess. 3. c. 2)
- Bigamy Act 1603 (1 Jas. 1. c. 11)
- Oath of Allegiance, etc. Act 1609 (7 Jas. 1. c. 6)
- Confirmation of Marriages Act 1660 (12 Cha. 2. c. 33)
- Marriage Duty Act 1694 (6 & 7 Will. & Mar. c. 6)
- Marriage Act 1697 (9 Will. 3. c. 3 (I)), a penal law passed by the Parliament of Ireland discouraging interfaith marriages. All interfaith marriages would be considered legally Catholic. The married couple would have to live under the tough Catholic laws.
- Clandestine Marriages Act 1753 (26 Geo. 2. c. 33)
- Marriage Confirmation Act 1830 (11 Geo. 4 & 1 Will. 4. c. 18) (short title: 1896 Act, s.1)
- Marriage and Registration Act 1856 (19 & 20 Vict. c. 119) (short title: 1896 Act, s.1)
- Foreign Marriage Act 1892 (55 & 56 Vict. c. 23)
- Marriage with Foreigners Act 1906 (6 Edw. 7. c. 40)
- Marriage of British Subjects (Facilities) Act 1915 (5 & 6 Geo. 5. c. 40)
- Marriage of British Subjects (Facilities) Amendment Act 1916 (6 & 7 Geo. 5. c. 21)
- Age of Marriage Act 1929 (19 & 20 Geo. 5. c. 36)
- Marriage Act 1939 (2 & 3 Geo. 6. c. 33)
- Foreign Marriage Act 1947 (10 & 11 Geo. 6. c. 33)
- Marriage Act 1949 (12, 13 & 14 Geo. 6. c. 76)
- Marriage Act 1949 (Amendment) Act 1954 (2 & 3 Eliz. 2. c. 47)
- Marriage Acts Amendment Act 1958 (6 & 7 Eliz. 2. c. 29)
- Marriage (Secretaries of Synagogues) Act 1959 (7 & 8 Eliz. 2. c. 13)
- Marriage (Enabling) Act 1960 (8 & 9 Eliz. 2. c. 29)
- Marriage (Wales and Monmouthshire) Act 1962 (10 & 11 Eliz. 2. c. 32)
- Marriage (Registrar General's Licence) Act 1970 (c. 34)
- Marriage Act 1983 (c. 32)
- Marriage (Prohibited Degrees of Relationship) Act 1986 (c. 16)
- Marriage (Wales) Act 1986 (c. 7)
- Foreign Marriage (Amendment) Act 1988 (c. 44)
- Marriage (Registration of Buildings) Act 1990 (c. 33)
- Marriage Act 1994 (c. 34)
- Marriage Ceremony (Prescribed Words) Act 1996 (c. 34)
- City of London (Approved Premises for Marriage) Act 1996 (c. iv)
- Forced Marriage (Civil Protection) Act 2007 (c. 20)
- Marriage (Wales) Act 2010 (c. 6)
- Marriage (Same Sex Couples) Act 2013 (c. 30)
- Marriage and Civil Partnership (Minimum Age) Act 2022 (c. 28)

=== Scotland ===
- Marriage (Scotland) Act 1939 (2 & 3 Geo. 6. c. 34)
- Marriage (Scotland) Act 1956 (4 & 5 Eliz. 2. c. 70)
- Marriage (Scotland) Act 1977 (c. 15)
- Marriage (Scotland) Act 2002 (asp 8)
- Marriage and Civil Partnership (Scotland) Act 2014 (asp 5)

=== Northern Ireland ===
- Deceased Brother's Widow's Marriage Act (Northern Ireland) 1924 (14 & 15 Geo. 5. c. 22 (N.I.)
- Marriage (Declaration of Law) Act (Northern Ireland) 1944 (c. 7 (N.I.))
- Age of Marriage Act (Northern Ireland) 1951 (c. 25 (N.I.))

== United States ==
- The repealed Affirmation of Marriage Act in Virginia (1997)
- The overturned Defense of Marriage Act (1996)
- The failed Marriage Protection Act (2004)
- South Carolina Amendment 1 (2006)
- The Respect for Marriage Act (2022)

== See also ==
- List of short titles
- Marriage law
