= First Statute of Repeal =

Act of the Parliament of England

- Act of Parliament
- Parliament of England
- Long title: An Acte for the Repeale of certayne Statutes made in the time of the Reigne of Kinge Edwarde the Syxthe.
- Citation: 1 Mar. Sess. 2. c. 2
- Territorial extent: England and Wales

Dates
- Royal assent: 5 December 1553
- Commencement: 24 October 1553 (Note: Start of session.)
- Repealed: 7 July 1604
Other legislation
Repeals/revokes	Sacrament Act 1547; Election of Bishops Act 1547; Act of Uniformity 1548; Clergy Marriage Act 1548; Consecration of Bishops, etc. Act 1549
Amended by	Act of Uniformity 1558
Repealed by	Continuance, etc. of Laws Act 1603
Relates to	Second Statute of Repeal

Status: Repealed

Text of statute as originally enacted

The First Statute of Repeal (1 Mar. Sess. 2. c. 2) was an act of the Parliament of England, passed in 1553 in the first Parliament of Mary I's reign, that nullified all religious legislation passed under the previous monarch, the boy-king Edward VI, and the de facto rulers of that time, Edward Seymour, 1st Duke of Somerset, and John Dudley, 1st Duke of Northumberland.

== Provisions ==
Section 1 of the act repealed 9 enactments, listed in that section, namely:

- The Sacrament Act 1547 (1 Edw. 6. c. 1)
- The Election of Bishops Act 1547 (1 Edw. 6. c. 2)
- The Act of Uniformity 1548 (2 & 3 Edw. 6. c. 1)
- The Clergy Marriage Act 1548 (2 & 3 Edw. 6. c. 21)
- The Putting away of Books and Images Act 1549 (3 & 4 Edw. 6. c. 10)
- The Consecration of Bishops, etc. Act 1549 (3 & 4 Edw. 6. c. 12)
- The Act of Uniformity 1551 (5 & 6 Edw. 6. c. 1)
- The Holy Days and Fasting Days Act 1551 (5 & 6 Edw. 6. c. 3)
- The Clergy Marriage Act 1551 (5 & 6 Edw. 6. c. 12)

Section 2 of the act provided that from and after 20 December 1553, divine services and administration of sacraments would be performed as used in the last year of the reign of Henry VIII (1547).

Section 3 of the act provided that divine services may be performed under the repealed acts before 20 December 1553.

== Legacy ==
The act was nullified by Elizabeth I's Act of Uniformity 1558 (1 Eliz. 1. c. 2), which stated that:

at the death of our late sovereign lord King Edward VI there remained one uniform order of common service and prayer, and of the administration of sacraments, rites, and ceremonies in the Church of England, which was set forth in one book, intituled: The Book of Common Prayer, and Administration of Sacraments [...] the said statute of repeal, and everything therein contained, only concerning the said book, and the service, administration of sacraments, rites, and ceremonies contained or appointed in or by the said book, shall be void and of none effect.

The whole act was repealed by section 8 of Continuance, etc. of Laws Act 1603 (1 Jas. 1. c. 25).

== See also ==
- Revival of the Heresy Acts
- Second Statute of Repeal
