= Age of Marriage Act 1929 =

Act of the Parliament of the United Kingdom

Age of Marriage Act 1929 (Note: Section 3(1).)
- Act of Parliament
- Parliament of the United Kingdom
- Long title: An Act to make void marriages between persons either of whom is under the age of sixteen.
- Citation: 19 & 20 Geo. 5. c. 36
- Territorial extent: England and Wales; Scotland; (Note: Section 3(2).)

Dates
- Royal assent: 10 May 1929
- Commencement: 10 May 1929 (Note: The Acts of Parliament (Commencement) Act 1793.)
- Repealed: England and Wales: 1 April 1958; Scotland: 1 January 1978
Other legislation
Amends	Bastardy Laws Amendment Act 1872
Amended by	Marriage (Scotland) Act 1939; Marriage Act 1949; Sexual Offences Act 1956; Sexual Offences (Scotland) Act 1976; Marriage (Scotland) Act 1977
Repealed by	England and Wales: Affiliation Proceedings Act 1957; Scotland: Marriage (Scotland) Act 1977
Relates to	Age of Marriage Act (Northern Ireland) 1951

Status: Repealed

Text of statute as originally enacted

The Age of Marriage Act 1929 (19 & 20 Geo. 5. c. 36) was an act of the Parliament of the United Kingdom which increased the age of marriage to sixteen. It was passed in response to a campaign by the National Union of Societies for Equal Citizenship.

== Subsequent developments ==
The whole act was repealed for England and Wales by section 12(1) of, and the schedule to, the Affiliation Proceedings Act 1957 (5 & 6 Eliz. 2. c. 55), which came into force on 1 April 1958.

The whole act was repealed for Scotland by section 28(2) of, and schedule 3 to, the Marriage (Scotland) Act 1977, which came into force on 1 January 1978.

Age of Marriage Act (Northern Ireland) 1951 (Note: Section 3.)
- Act of Parliament
- Parliament of Northern Ireland
- Long title: An Act to make void marriages between persons either of whom is under the age of sixteen.
- Citation: 1951 c. 25 (N.I.)
- Territorial extent: Northern Ireland

Dates
- Royal assent: 20 December 1951
Other legislation
Amended by	Sexual Offences (Northern Ireland) Order 2008; Marriage (Same-sex Couples) and Civil Partnership (Opposite-sex Couples) (Northern Ireland) Regulations 2019
Relates to	Age of Marriage Act 1929

Status: Amended

Revised text of statute as amended

Text of the Age of Marriage Act (Northern Ireland) 1951 as in force today (including any amendments) within the United Kingdom, from legislation.gov.uk.

Corresponding provision was made for Northern Ireland by the Age of Marriage Act (Northern Ireland) 1951 (c. 25 (N.I.)).

== Section 1 ==
At common law and by canon law a person who had attained the legal age of puberty could contract a valid marriage. A marriage contracted by persons either of whom was under the legal age of puberty was voidable. The legal age of puberty was fourteen years for males and twelve years for females. This section amended the law so that a marriage contracted by persons either of whom was under the age of sixteen years was void. This provision is re-enacted by section 2 of the Marriage Act 1949.

In section 1(1), the words from the beginning to "Provided that", and section 1(2)(a), of the act were repealed by part I of the fifth schedule to the Marriage Act 1949 (12, 13 & 14 Geo. 6. c. 76), which came into force on 1 January 1950.

The proviso to section 1(1) was repealed for England and Wales by section 51 of, and the fourth schedule to, the Sexual Offences Act 1956 (4 & 5 Eliz. 2. c. 69), which came into force on 1 January 1957, and for Scotland by section 21(2) of, and schedule 2 to, the Sexual Offences (Scotland) Act 1976, which came into force on 15 December 1976.

See also sections 6(2) and 14(3) of the Sexual Offences Act 1956 (4 & 5 Eliz. 2. c. 69).

== Reception ==
In Pugh v Pugh (1951), Pearce J said:

According to modern thought it is considered socially and morally wrong that persons of an age, at which we now believe them to be immature and provide for their education, should have the stresses, responsibilities and sexual freedom of marriage and the physical strain of childbirth. Child marriages by common consent are bad for the participants and bad for the institution of marriage.

The Justice of the Peace and Local Government Review said that "Acts of Parliament that lay down hard and fast rules interfering with individual liberty are certain to give rise to some unsatisfactory results" and that this particular Act was "no exception".

== See also ==
- Child marriage
- Marriage Act
- Marriage in England and Wales
- Marriage in Scotland
