= Statute of Repeal =

The Statutes of Repeal were two Statutes passed under Mary I of England, repealing the legal Protestant advance and break from Rome that had occurred under Henry VIII and Edward VI. Please see:

- The First Statute of Repeal, passed in 1553
- Second Statute of Repeal, passed in 1555
