= Marriage with a deceased wife's sister =

Victorian legal and social debate

The permissibility of marriage with a deceased wife's sister was a debate that raged in the United Kingdom during the Victorian era. This prohibition had derived from a doctrine of canon law whereby those who were connected by marriage were regarded as being related to each other in a way which made marriage between them improper.

== Legal background ==
Prohibited degree of kinship for marriage included relatives by blood (consanguinity) to prevent incest, and extended to relatives by marriage (affinity) apparently reflecting an analogous taboo, or the idea that a married couple were "one flesh". Originally, marriage was a matter of canon law in the United Kingdom and its predecessor kingdoms of England, Scotland, and Ireland. Before the Reformation, the affinity rules of Catholic canon law applied, which since the Council of Elvira had regarded a deceased wife's sister as within the prohibited degrees, which could be exempted only by matrimonial dispensation from the pope. The Reformation saw all three kingdoms replace the Catholic prohibitions with ones based on the incest prohibitions of Leviticus 18: in England by the Marriage Act 1540 (32 Hen. 8. c. 38) and Matthew Parker's 1563 "Table of Kindred and Affinity", both later adopted in Ireland, and in Scotland by the Marriage Act 1567, the Scots Confession 1560 and the Westminster Confession of Faith 1646.

In Scotland, while the Confession absolutely prohibited marrying one's deceased wife's sister, the 1567 Act did not, causing some uncertainty. In 1889 Arthur Elliot introduced a bill to clarify this but it was defeated as superfluous, since the Confession had been adopted by statute.

In the Church of England and Church of Ireland, a marriage within the prohibited degrees was not absolutely void ab initio but it was voidable at the suit in ecclesiastical court of any interested party. Matthew Boulton married his deceased wife's sister in 1760. He advised silence, secrecy and Scotland, although they married in London; the marriage was opposed by her brother. Similarly Charles Austen, the younger brother of Jane Austen, married his deceased wife's sister in 1820 and remained married to her until he died in 1852.

=== 1830s changes ===
As long as both spouses of a voidable marriage lived, their children had the uncertain prospect of being made bastards by the voiding of the marriage. This prompted John Copley, 1st Baron Lyndhurst to introduce "Lord Lyndhurst's Act", later the Marriage Act 1835 (5 & 6 Will. 4. c. 54), which hardened the English and Irish law into an absolute prohibition, so that from then on such marriages could no longer take place in the United Kingdom of Great Britain and Ireland and colonies at all. However, such marriages which had already taken place were validated.

After 1835, a marriage between a widower and his late wife's sister was still recognised in the United Kingdom if it took place abroad where it was lawful. For example, the painters William Holman Hunt and John Collier married the sisters of their deceased wives in, respectively, Switzerland and Norway. However, this was only possible for those who could afford to travel abroad; moreover, in 1861 the House of Lords ruled in Brook v Brook that one spouse had to be domiciled in the jurisdiction of the wedding. While the Marriage Act 1836 allowed for civil marriage in a register office, the prohibitions of affinity remained unaffected.

An 1848 parliamentary inquiry concluded that the Marriage Act 1835 had not appreciably diminished the number of putative marriages within the prohibited degrees. Its survey of part of England found 1364 such marriages since 1835 – more than 90% with a deceased wife's sister – compared with only 88 planned marriages prevented by the act, of whom 32 couples remained in "open cohabitation".

== Campaigns ==
In 1842, a Marriage to a Deceased Wife's Sister Bill was introduced, and defeated by strong opposition. "Although seemingly a minor skirmish, [it] had far-ranging implications and was fought on the political scene almost annually for most of the Victorian period". Peter Ferriday observed in his biography of Edmund Beckett, 1st Baron Grimthorpe: "Was there a single eminent Victorian who did not at some time or other announce his views on the 'deceased wife's sister'? She was the teething ring of all Victorian controversialists...".

The topic was a main point in several novels: Felicia Skene's The Inheritance of Evil (1849, published anonymously) opposed change, while Dinah Craik's Hannah (1871) and William Clark Russell's The Deceased Wife's Sister (1874, published anonymously) supported change. Craik had accompanied Edith Waugh to her Swiss wedding with her sister Fanny's widower William Holman Hunt.

Widowers' desires to marry their sisters-in-law became the subject of particular agitation from the 1860s onward, and strong feelings were roused on both sides. However, it was to be nearly 50 years before the campaign for a change in the law was successful, despite the introduction of draft legislation in Parliament on many occasions. The lengthy nature of the campaign was referred to in the Gilbert and Sullivan opera Iolanthe (1882), in which the Queen of the Fairies sings "He shall prick that annual blister, marriage with deceased wife's sister".

Near the end of Thomas Hardy's novel Tess of the d'Urbervilles (1891), Tess suggests that after her death, her husband Angel should marry her younger sister Liza-Lu; at the time the novel was set and published, such a marriage would have been illegal in England.

In 1855, a year after resigning as Lieutenant-Governor of Victoria, Charles La Trobe married his deceased Swiss wife's sister in Neuchâtel. This ended his prospects of further public office, although he was made Companion of the Order of the Bath in 1858. After Stella Duckworth's 1897 death, her husband John Hills courted her half-sister Vanessa Stephen [later Bell], but Stella's brother George Herbert Duckworth pressed them to break up, given that the 1835 Act prohibited their marrying.

Edward Marjoribanks, 2nd Baron Tweedmouth, told the House of Lords in 1907:

Between 1851 and 1889 you rejected the Deceased Wife's Sister Bill thirteen times. In 1883 you read it a second time, and in 1896, on the Motion of Lord Dunraven, it was read a second time by a majority of 38, the figures being 142 to 104; and the Bill was in that year passed through your Lordships' House to suffer extinction in the other House. In the House of Commons, during the fifty-eight years between 1849 and this year, the Deceased Wife's Sister Bill was carried by large majorities nineteen times.

=== Colonies ===
Although the 1835 act applied throughout the British Empire, it was among the class of laws which the Colonial Laws Validity Act 1865 allowed colonies with responsible government to amend. Deceased Wife's Sister's Marriage Acts were passed by the Australian colonies in the 1870s, and by the Dominion of Canada in 1882. Although British law recognised foreign marriages, British colonies were not considered foreign, and it was unclear, until the passage of the Colonial Marriages (Deceased Wife's Sister) Act 1906, whether such colonial marriages would be recognised within the United Kingdom.

== 1907 act ==
Deceased Wife's Sister's Marriage Act 1907 (Note: Section 6.)
- Act of Parliament
- Parliament of the United Kingdom
- Long title: An Act to amend the Law relating to Marriage with a Deceased Wife's Sister.
- Citation: 7 Edw. 7. c. 47
- Introduced by: William Brampton Gurdon (Commons)
- Territorial extent: United Kingdom

Dates
- Royal assent: 28 August 1907
- Commencement: 28 August 1907 (Note: The Acts of Parliament (Commencement) Act 1793.)
- Repealed: England and Wales: 1 January 1950; Scotland: 13 April 1960; Northern Ireland: 19 February 1985
Other legislation
Amended by	Deceased Brother's Widow's Marriage Act 1921; Marriage (Prohibited Degrees) Relationship Act 1931
Repealed by	England and Wales: Marriage Act 1949; Scotland: Marriage (Enabling) Act 1960; Northern Ireland: Family Law (Miscellaneous Provisions) (Northern Ireland) Order 1984
Relates to	Colonial Marriages (Deceased Wife's Sister) Act 1906; Deceased Brother's Widow's Marriage Act (Northern Ireland) 1924

Status: Repealed

Status
- England and Wales: Repealed
- Scotland: Repealed
- Republic of Ireland: Amended
- Northern Ireland: Repealed

History of passage through Parliament

Text of statute as originally enacted

The Deceased Wife's Sister's Marriage Act 1907 (7 Edw. 7. c. 47) removed the prohibition while providing savers for various existing laws, some to placate opposition of the Lords Spiritual (Church of England bishops). The bill was introduced as a private member's bill by William Brampton Gurdon, a backbencher of the Liberal Party, which was then in government. The government belatedly decided to support the bill, which David G. Barrie sees as evidence of its commitment to social reform and willingness to take on the Lords, foreshadowing the Parliament Act 1911.

=== Provisions ===
Section 1 of the act removed the affinity between a man and his deceased wife's sister as grounds for annulment of a past or future marriage. It allowed a Church of England clergyman to refuse to officiate at such a wedding, and to nominate a substitute clergyman of the same diocese to officiate in his stead. Past marriages of such affinity would remain null, notwithstanding the change in law, if they had already been annulled or either spouse had subsequently married someone else.

Section 2 provided that inheritance rights and obligations would not be changed by the validation of past marriages under the Act.

Section 3 provided that the Matrimonial Causes Act 1857 would be unaffected; adultery with one's wife's sister remained grounds for divorce proceedings, and a man was still forbidden from marrying his divorced wife's sister.

Section 4 retained the liability to ecclesiastical censure of a Church of England clergyman who married his deceased wife's sister.

Section 5 provided that the provisions applied to half-sisters.

Section 6 assigned the Act's short title.

=== Case law ===
The 1907 refusal of Holy Communion by the vicar of Eaton, Norfolk, to a parishioner legally married to his deceased wife's sister was overruled in 1908 by the statement of the Arches Court (a ruling upheld in 1912 by the House of Lords) that section 1 of the 1907 Act meant the Sacrament Act 1547 no longer applied to such spouses.

The will of a man who died in 1902 specified that income from his investments would be paid to his widow until her remarriage. The income continued after her invalid 1904 remarriage to her deceased sister's widower. In 1911, Robert Parker ruled that, although s. 1 of the 1907 Act validated the 1904 marriage, s. 2 prevented termination of the 1902 income.

A putative widow died shortly after the 1907 enactment. A son from her late husband's first marriage to her sister died intestate in 1911. Later that year, Thomas Warrington ruled that the widow's children were entitled to the same share of their half-brother's estate as his full siblings.

If one was forbidden from marrying someone even after one's current spouse died, then sex with them while one's current spouse lived was considered to constitute the crime of incest under the Scottish Marriage Act 1567, and considered grounds for divorce under the Matrimonial Causes Act 1857. As regards sex with one's living wife's sister, the Deceased Wife's Sister's Marriage Act 1907 explicitly preserved the 1857 position but was silent on the 1567 position. A 1913 decision of the High Court of Justiciary held that such sex, though still adulterous, was no longer incestuous under the 1907 act.

Where settlement funds were to be held in trust for the children of A as well by B as by every and any future wife he might marry, and A, after the death of B, by whom he had three children who all attained 21 in his lifetime, went through the form of marriage with the sister of his dead wife and had three children by her, and subsequently s. 1 of the 1907 act legalized that marriage. In 1922, Frank Russell held that the effect of s. 2 was to provide that rights of property existing at the date of that marriage were not to be altered or interfered with, and that accordingly the children of the second marriage took no share of the settlement funds.

== Subsequent legislation ==
Deceased Brother's Widow's Marriage Act 1921 (Note: Section 2.)
- Act of Parliament
- Parliament of the United Kingdom
- Long title: An Act to amend the Law relating to marriage with a deceased brother's widow.
- Citation: 11 & 12 Geo. 5. c. 24
- Territorial extent: United Kingdom

Dates
- Royal assent: 28 July 1921
- Commencement: 28 July 1921
- Repealed: England and Wales: 1 January 1950; Scotland: 13 April 1960; Northern Ireland: 19 February 1985
Other legislation
Amends	Deceased Wife's Sister's Marriage Act 1907
Amended by	Deceased Brother's Widow's Marriage Act (Northern Ireland) 1924
Repealed by	England and Wales: Marriage Act 1949; Scotland: Marriage (Enabling) Act 1960; Northern Ireland: Family Law (Miscellaneous Provisions) (Northern Ireland) Order 1984

Status: Repealed

Text of statute as originally enacted

The 1907 act did exactly what it said and no more. It was amended by the Deceased Brother's Widow's Marriage Act 1921 (11 & 12 Geo. 5. c. 24) to allow a widow to marry her deceased husband's brother. This was a response to First World War deaths to encourage remarriages, reducing war widows' pensions and increasing the birth rate.

In Great Britain, section 3 of the 1907 act was repealed by the Supreme Court of Judicature (Consolidation) Act 1925. The Marriage (Prohibited Degrees of Relationship) Act 1931 (21 & 22 Geo. 5. c. 31) extended the operation of the 1907 act to allow the marriages of nieces and nephews by marriage as well. Section 4 of the 1907 act was rendered moot in 1944, when the Convocations of Canterbury and York voted to align the Church of England prohibited degrees with the civil law. In England and Wales the 1907, 1921, and 1931 Acts were repealed and consolidated by the Marriage Act 1949. In Scotland they were repealed the Marriage (Enabling) Act 1960 (8 & 9 Eliz. 2. c. 29), which also permitted marriage in Great Britain with a relative of a former spouse who was divorced rather than deceased. The prohibition on marriage with a divorced wife's sister is the crux of the plot of Cyril Hare's 1949 novel When the Wind Blows. In 1947 the House of Lords personal bill committee rejected a petition from a couple for a private act of Parliament exempting them from this prohibition.

Deceased Brother's Widow's Marriage Act (Northern Ireland) 1924
- Act of Parliament
- Parliament of Northern Ireland
- Long title: An Act to remove doubts as to the application of the Deceased Brother's Widow's Marriage Act, 1921, to Northern Ireland.
- Citation: 14 & 15 Geo. 5. c. 22 (N.I.)
- Territorial extent: Northern Ireland

Dates
- Royal assent: 7 November 1924
- Commencement: 7 November 1924
- Repealed: 19 February 1985
Other legislation
Amends	Deceased Brother's Widow's Marriage Act 1921
Repealed by	Family Law (Miscellaneous Provisions) (Northern Ireland) Order 1984

Status: Repealed

Text of statute as originally enacted

Revised text of statute as amended

In Northern Ireland, the Parliament of Northern Ireland passed the Deceased Brother's Widow's Marriage Act (Northern Ireland) 1924 (14 & 15 Geo. 5. c. 22 (N.I.)) to remove doubts as to the application of the 1921 act there. Section 3 of the 1907 act was repealed by the Matrimonial Causes Act (Northern Ireland) 1939 (3 & 4 Geo. 6. c. 13 (N.I.)). The provisions of the 1931 and 1960 Acts regarding nieces and nephews in Great Britain were replicated for Northern Ireland in 1949 and 1978 respectively. The 1978 statute repealed the 1939 Act and replaced the others. A 1984 statute replaced the 1978 statute, and repealed it and the earlier unrepealed ones.

In Republic of Ireland law the 1907 act has not been amended since 1921, amendments made by Westminster subsequent to the coming into force of the Constitution of the Irish Free State being held not to apply. In 1984, the Law Reform Commission recommended abolishing all restrictions based on affinity as opposed to consanguinity. In 2006, ruling in favour of a woman wishing to marry her divorced husband's brother, the High Court found section 3(2) of the 1907 act as amended by the 1921 act was incompatible with the Constitution of Ireland since the 1996 legalisation of divorce. Other degrees of affinity remain prohibited in law, although jurist Maebh Harding suggests a case similar to 2006 would find them unconstitutional.

== Timeline ==
Marriage with sister-in-law banned
Marriage with brother-in-law banned
│
1830
│
1840
│
1850
│
1860
│
1870
│
1880
│
1890
│
1900
│
1910
│
1920
│
1930
UK legislation timeline

== See also ==
- Marriage Act 1753
- Marriage Act (disambiguation)
- Catherine of Aragon as wife and widow of Arthur
- Howards End by E.M. Forster
- The Patriot, a feature film criticized for its portrayal of a devout Anglican who married his deceased wife's sister in direct contradiction of contemporary law

== Sources ==
Primary

- Royal Commission on the State and Operation of the Law of Marriage (1848). First Report of the Commissioners Appointed to Inquire Into the State and Operation of the Law of Marriage, as Relating to the Prohibited Degrees of Affinity . London: Her Majesty's Stationery Office – via Wikisource.
- Hansard index:
  - Marriage with a Deceased Wife's Sister Bill
  - Deceased Wife's Sister Bill
  - Deceased Wife's Sister Act
  - Deceased Wife's Sister's Marriage Act 1907

Secondary

- Bennett, Bruce S. (October 1998). "Banister v Thompson and Afterwards: The Church of England and the Deceased Wife's Sister's Marriage Act". The Journal of Ecclesiastical History. 49 (4): 668–682. doi:10.1017/S0022046997005629. S2CID 161697483.
- Bradley, Ian (1996). The Complete Annotated Gilbert and Sullivan. Oxford: Oxford University Press. ISBN 978-0-19-816503-3.
- Dale, William (1981). "Statutory Reform: The Draftsman and The Judge". International and Comparative Law Quarterly. 30 (1): 141–164. doi:10.1093/iclqaj/30.1.141. JSTOR 759378.
- Eversley, William Pinder; Craies, William Feilden (1910). The Marriage Laws of the British Empire. London: Stevens and Haynes.
- Group appointed by the Archbishop of Canterbury [Robert Runcie] (1984). No Just Cause: The Law of Affinity in England and Wales: Some Suggestions for Change. London: CIO. ISBN 978-0-7151-3697-3.
- Gruner, Elisabeth Rose (Winter 1999). "Born and Made: Sisters, Brothers, and the Deceased Wife's Sister Bill". The Modern Language Journal. 24 (2): 423–447. ISSN 0026-7902. JSTOR 3175648.
- Hammick, James Thomas (1887). The Marriage Law of England: A Practical Treatise on the Legal Incidents Connected with the Law of Constitution of the Matrimonial Contract, with an Appendix of Statutes, Summary of Colonial Marriage Laws, and Other Information. London: Shaw & Sons.
- Wolfram, Sybil (1987). "The Prohibited Degrees of Marriage and Incest". In-laws and outlaws: kinship and marriage in England. New York: St. Martin's. pp. 21–51. ISBN 978-0-312-00550-4.
