= Marriage Act 1949 =

Act of the Parliament of the United Kingdom

Marriage Act 1949 (Note: Section 80(1).)
- Act of Parliament
- Parliament of the United Kingdom
- Long title: An Act to consolidate certain enactments relating to the solemnization and registration of marriages in England with such corrections and improvements as may be authorised under the Consolidation of Enactments (Procedure) Act, 1949.
- Citation: 12, 13 & 14 Geo. 6. c. 76
- Territorial extent: England and Wales (Note: Section 80(3).)

Dates
- Royal assent: 24 November 1949
- Commencement: 1 January 1950 (Note: Section 80(4).)
Other legislation
Amends	See § Repealed enactments
Repeals/revokes	See § Repealed enactments
Amended by	Registration Service Act 1953; Statute Law Revision Act 1953; Marriage Act 1949 (Amendment) Act 1954; Marriage Acts Amendment Act 1958; Marriage (Secretaries of Synagogues) Act 1959; Marriage (Enabling) Act 1960; Marriages (Wales and Monmouthshire) Act 1962; Family Law Reform Act 1969; Statute Law (Repeals) Act 1975; Children Act 1975; Marriage (Scotland) Act 1977; Armed Forces Act 1981; Criminal Justice Act 1982; Marriage Act 1983; Pastoral Measure 1983; Marriage (Prohibited Degrees of Relationship) Act 1986; Marriage (Wales) Act 1986; Patronage (Benefices) Measure 1986; Family Law Reform Act 1987; Children Act 1989; Marriage (Registration of Buildings) Act 1990; Marriage Act 1994; City of London (Approved Premises for Marriage) Act 1996; Marriage Ceremony (Prescribed Words) Act 1996; Immigration and Asylum Act 1999; Armed Forces Act 2001; Civil Partnership Act 2004; Gender Recognition Act 2004; Church of England Marriage Measure 2008; Marriage (Wales) Act 2010; Ecclesiastical Fees (Amendment) Measure 2011; Mission and Pastoral Measure 2011; Church of England Marriage (Amendment) Measure 2012; Protection of Freedoms Act 2012; Crime and Courts Act 2013; Marriage (Same Sex Couples) Act 2013; Defence Reform Act 2014; Immigration Act 2014; Deregulation Act 2015; Immigration Act 2016; Church of England (Miscellaneous Provisions) Measure 2018; Church Property Measure 2018; Church Representation and Ministers Measure 2019; Marriage and Civil Partnership (Minimum Age) Act 2022; Victims and Prisoners Act 2024
Relates to	Consolidation of Enactments (Procedure) Act 1949; Civil Partnerships, Marriages and Deaths (Registration etc) Act 2019

Status: Amended

Text of statute as originally enacted

Revised text of statute as amended

Text of the Marriage Act 1949 as in force today (including any amendments) within the United Kingdom, from legislation.gov.uk.

The Marriage Act 1949 (12, 13 & 14 Geo. 6. c. 76) is an act of the Parliament of the United Kingdom regulating marriages in England and Wales.

The act had prohibited solemnising marriages during evenings and at night. Since the Marriage Act 1836 (6 & 7 Will. 4. c. 85) it had been forbidden to marry between the hours of six in the evening and eight in the morning. This prohibition was repealed on 1 October 2012.

The act was the first act to be enacted under the Consolidation of Enactments (Procedure) Act 1949 (12, 13 & 14 Geo. 6. c. 33).

== Section 1 - Marriages within prohibited degrees ==
Section 1 marriages of persons within the prohibited degrees of relationships listed in the schedule are void.

The prohibited relationships were based on the Table of Kindred and Affinity which had been included in the Book of Common Prayer of the Church of England since 1662. The list included parents, grandparents, children, grandchildren, siblings, aunts and uncles, nieces and nephews, as well as a number of affinity relationships. The Children Act 1975 added adoptive parents and children, and former adoptive parents and children to the prohibited list. The list was significantly changed, especially by the Marriage (Prohibited Degrees of Relationship) Act 1986, which removed affinity relationships from the list and made other changes.

== Section 2 - Marriages of persons under sixteen ==
This section re-enacts section 1 of the Age of Marriage Act 1929 (19 & 20 Geo. 5. c. 36) which set the minimum marriage age at 16 with consent of parents or guardians and 21 (since lowered to 18) without that consent. Marriages contracted by persons either of whom is under the age of 16 years are void. Before 1929, the common law and canon law applied so that a person who had attained the legal age of puberty could contract a valid marriage. A marriage contracted by persons either of whom was under the legal age of puberty was voidable. The legal age of puberty was 14 for males and 12 for females.

In 1971, Eekelaar wrote that the prohibition now contained in this section "though desirable, is extreme and inflexible." According to him it could result in "genuine hardship", such as where it is discovered, after years of apparent marriage, that a mistake was made, at the time of the ceremony, regarding the age of one of the spouses, or where one of the spouses concealed their real age, though, after 1971, some protection was afforded by section 6 of the Law Reform (Miscellaneous Provisions) Act 1970 (now repealed and replaced by the Inheritance (Provision for Family and Dependants) Act 1975).

== Section 4 - Hours for solemnization of marriages ==
Originally, a marriage had to be solemnised between 8 am and 6 pm. The section was repealed by the Protection of Freedoms Act 2012.

== Section 75 - Offences relating to solemnisation of marriages ==
Section 75(1)(a) was repealed by the Protection of Freedoms Act 2012.

== Royal family ==
The wedding of Charles, Prince of Wales and Camilla Parker Bowles in 2005 brought into question whether civil marriages were available to members of the British royal family. Lord Falconer, the Lord Chancellor, replied to the House of Lords that in his opinion the marriage was in accordance with the 1949 Act.

== Repealed enactments ==
Section 79 of the act repealed 40 enactments, listed in parts I and II of the fifth schedule to the act.

Part I — Acts of Parliament repealed
Citation	Short title	Extent of repeal
32 Hen. 8. c. 38	Marriage Act 1540	The whole act.
2 & 3 Edw. 6. c. 23	Marriages (Pre-contract) Act 1548	The whole act.
4 Geo. 4. c. 76	Marriage Act 1823	The whole act.
5 Geo. 4. c. 32	Marriage Act 1824	The whole act.
11 Geo. 4 & 1 Will. 4. c. 18	Marriage Confirmation Act 1830	Section two.
11 Geo. 4 & 1 Will. 4. c. 66	Forgery Act 1830	In section twenty-one the words "marriage" and "or of the parties married".
5 & 6 Will. 4. c. 54	Marriage Act 1835	The whole act.
6 & 7 Will. 4. c. 85	Marriage Act 1836	The whole act except sections three, seventeen and forty-five.
6 & 7 Will. 4. c. 86	Births and Deaths Registration Act 1836	Sections thirty, thirty-one, thirty-three, forty, forty-two and forty-four and Schedule C, and so much of sections seventeen, thirty-four, thirty-five, thirty-seven and thirty-eight as relates to registers of marriages or to certified copies thereof.
7 Will. 4 & 1 Vict. c. 22	Births and Deaths Registration Act 1837	Sections one, three, five, twenty-three, twenty-seven and thirty-three to thirty-six, and so much of sections twenty-six, twenty-eight and twenty-nine as relates to registers of marriages or to certified copies thereof.
3 & 4 Vict. c. 72	Marriage Act 1840	The whole act.
19 & 20 Vict. c. 119	Marriage and Registration Act 1856	The whole act except sections fifteen, sixteen, twenty-four and twenty-five.
20 Vict. c. 19	Extra-Parochial Places Act 1857	Sections nine and ten.
23 & 24 Vict. c. 18	Marriage (Society of Friends) Act 1860	The whole act.
23 & 24 Vict. c. 24	Marriage Confirmation Act 1860	The whole act.
35 & 36 Vict. c. 10	Marriage (Society of Friends) Act 1872	The whole act.
37 & 38 Vict. c. 88	Births and Deaths Registration Act 1874	Section thirty-two so far as it relates to the making of indexes of registers of marriages, section forty-one so far as it relates to documents relating to marriages, and the Second Schedule so far as it relates to fees payable for searches in marriage registers and for certified copies of entries therein.
49 & 50 Vict. c. 3	Marriages Validity Act 1886	The whole act.
49 & 50 Vict. c. 14	Marriage Act 1886	The whole act.
61 & 62 Vict. c. 58	Marriage Act 1898	The whole act.
62 & 63 Vict. c. 27	Marriages Validity Act 1899	The whole act so far as it relates to marriages solemnized in England.
7 Edw. 7. c. 47	Deceased Wife's Sister's Marriage Act 1907	The whole act.
8 Edw. 7. c. 26	Naval Marriages Act 1908	The whole act so far as it relates to marriages solemnized in England.
11 & 12 Geo. 5. c. 24	Deceased Brother's Widow's Marriage Act 1921	The whole act.
15 & 16 Geo. 5. c. 45	Guardianship of Infants Act 1925	Section nine, in subsection (2) of section eleven the words "except so far as it amends the law relating to the marriage of infants" and the Schedule.
19 & 20 Geo. 5. c. 36	Age of Marriage Act 1929	In section one, in subsection (1) the words from the beginning to "Provided that" and paragraph (a) of subsection (2).
21 & 22 Geo. 5. c. 31	Marriage (Prohibited Degrees of Relationship) Act 1931	Section one and in subsection (1) of section three the words from "and this Act" to the end of the subsection and subsections (2), (3) and (4) of that section.
22 & 23 Geo. 5. c. 31	Marriage (Naval, Military, and Air Force Chapels) Act 1932	The whole act.
24 & 25 Geo. 5. c. 13	Marriage (Extension of Hours) Act 1934	In section one, subsection (1) and in subsection (2) the words "the Marriage Act, 1886 and", section two, and in section three the words "and this Act and the Marriage Acts, 1811 to 1932 may be cited together as the Marriage Acts, 1811 to 1934".
2 & 3 Geo. 6. c. 33	Marriage Act 1939	Section one, so far as it relates to marriages solemnized in England, in subsection (3) of section two the words "section eight of the Marriage and Registration Act, 1856, section three of the Naval Marriages Act, 1908 and" and section three.
2 & 3 Geo. 6. c. 35	Marriages Validity Act 1939	The whole act.
4 & 5 Geo. 6. c. 47	Marriage (Members of His Majesty's Forces) Act 1941	The whole act.

Part II — Church Assembly Measures repealed
Citation	Short title	Extent of repeal
14 & 15 Geo. 5. No. 2	Union of Benefices Measure 1923	Subsection (3) of section twenty-five.
20 & 21 Geo. 5. No. 3	Marriage Measure 1930	The whole measure.
24 & 25 Geo. 5. No. 2	Banns of Marriage Measure 1934	The whole measure.
1 & 2 Geo. 6. No. 1	Marriage (Licensing of Chapels) Measure 1938	The whole measure.
4 & 5 Geo. 6. No. 1	Diocesan Reorganisation Committees Measure 1941	Paragraph (iii) of subsection (3) of section three.
6 & 7 Geo. 6. No. 1	New Parishes Measure 1943	Section twenty-five.
7 & 8 Geo. 6. No. 1	Reorganisation Areas Measure 1944	In section twenty-four the words "marriage registers and other" and the proviso to that section and subsection (2) of section twenty-eight.
12 & 13 Geo. 6. No. 3	Pastoral Reorganisation Measure 1949	In subsection (1) of section six the words from "and where banns" to the end of the subsection.

== See also ==
- Ahkter v Khan
- Marriage in England and Wales

== Bibliography ==
- J C Arnold. The Marriage Law of England. Staples Press. 1951. Chapter V and Appendix.
