= Non-marriage =

Non-marriage can refer to:

- Cohabitation
- Divorce
- Single person
- Void marriage
