= Second Statute of Repeal =

Act of the Parliament of England

See of Rome Act 1554
- Act of Parliament
- Parliament of England
- Long title: An Act repealing all Articles and Provisions made against the See Apostolick of Rome, since the twentieth Year of King Henry the Eighth, and for the Establishment of all Spiritual and Ecclesiastical Possessions and Hereditaments conveyed to the Laity.
- Citation: 1 & 2 Ph. & M. c. 8
- Territorial extent: England and Wales

Dates
- Royal assent: 16 January 1555
- Commencement: 12 November 1554 (Note: Start of session.)
- Repealed: 28 July 1863

Other legislation
- Amends: See § Repealed enactments
- Repeals/revokes: See § Repealed enactments
- Amended by: Act of Uniformity 1558
- Repealed by: Statute Law Revision Act 1863
- Relates to: First Statute of Repeal

Status: Repealed

Text of statute as originally enacted

The Second Statute of Repeal (1 & 2 Ph. & M. c. 8) or the See of Rome Act 1554, was an act of the Parliament of England passed in the Parliament of Queen Mary I and King Philip in 1555, followed the First Statute of Repeal (1 Mar. Sess. 2. c. 2) of 1553. The first statute had abolished all religious legislation passed under Edward VI and the second statute built on it by abolishing all religious legislation passed against the papacy from 1529 (the fall of Cardinal Thomas Wolsey) in Henry VIII's reign. It was supported by the landed classes as it allowed them to keep the monastic land which they had acquired after the dissolution of the monasteries.

== Provisions ==
=== Repealed enactments ===
Section 3 of the act repealed 6 enactments, listed in that section, namely:

Citation	Short title	Extent of repeal
23 Hen. 8. c. 9	Ecclesiastical Jurisdiction Act 1531	The whole act.
24 Hen. 8. c. 12	Ecclesiastical Appeals Act 1532	The whole act.
23 Hen. 8. c. 20	Payment of Annates Act 1531	The whole act.
25 Hen. 8. c. 19	Submission of the Clergy Act 1533	The whole act.
25 Hen. 8. c. 20	Appointment of Bishops Act 1533	The whole act.
25 Hen. 8. c. 21	Ecclesiastical Licences Act 1533	The whole act.

Section 4 of the act repealed 10 enactments, listed in that section, namely:

Citation	Short title	Extent of repeal
23 Hen. 8. c. 1	Ecclesiastical Jurisdiction Act 1531	The whole act.
26 Hen. 8. c. 1	Act of Supremacy 1534	The whole act.
26 Hen. 8. c. 14	Suffragan Bishops Act 1534	The whole act.
27 Hen. 8. c. 15	Ecclesiastical Canons Act 1535	The whole act.
28 Hen. 8. c. 10	See of Rome Act 1536	The whole act.
28 Hen. 8. c. 16	Ecclesiastical Licences Act 1536	The whole act.
28 Hen. 8. c. 7	Succession to the Crown Act 1536	That concerneth a prohibition to marry within the degrees expressed in the said act. I.e., section 7.
31 Hen. 8. c. 9	Bishops Act 1539	The whole act.
32 Hen. 8. c. 38	Marriage Act 1540	The whole act.
35 Hen. 8. c. 3	King's Style Act 1543	The whole act.

Section 5 of the act repealed so much of the Succession to the Crown Act 1543 (35 Hen. 8. c. 1) as "toucheth the Oath against Supremacy, and all Oaths thereupon had made and given".

Section 6 of the act repealed the Ecclesiastical Jurisdiction Act 1545 (37 Hen. 8. c. 17).

Section 7 of the act repealed sections 5 and 6 of the Treason Act 1547 (1 Edw. 6. c. 12).

Section 8 of the act repealed all statutes since the twentieth year of the reign of Henry VIII against the Pope's supremacy.

== Subsequent developments ==
The statutes of repeal were eventually nullified by Elizabeth I's Act of Uniformity 1558 (1 Eliz. 1. c. 2).

The whole act was repealed by section 1 of, and the schedule to, the Statute Law Revision Act 1863 (26 & 27 Vict. c. 125), which came into force on 28 July 1863.

== See also ==
- English Reformation
- Revival of the Heresy Acts
