= Church Discipline Act 1840 =

Act of the Parliament of the United Kingdom

Church Discipline Act 1840 (Note: The citation of this act by this short title was authorised by section 1 of, and the first schedule to, the Short Titles Act 1896. Due to the repeal of those provisions it is now authorised by section 19(2) of the Interpretation Act 1978.)
- Act of Parliament
- Parliament of the United Kingdom
- Long title: An Act for better enforcing Church Discipline.
- Citation: 3 & 4 Vict. c. 86
- Territorial extent: England and Wales; Scotland; (Note: Section 25.)

Dates
- Royal assent: 7 August 1840
- Commencement: 7 August 1840 (Note: The Acts of Parliament (Commencement) Act 1793.)
- Repealed: 1 March 1965

Other legislation
- Repeals/revokes: Clergy Act 1485
- Amended by: Appellate Jurisdiction Act 1876; Clergy Discipline Act 1892
- Repealed by: Ecclesiastical Jurisdiction Measure 1963
- Relates to: Ecclesiastical Jurisdiction Act 1531; Ecclesiastical Suits Act 1787; Pluralities Act 1838

Status: Repealed

Text of statute as originally enacted

The Church Discipline Act 1840 (3 & 4 Vict. c. 86) was an act of the Parliament of the United Kingdom.

The act provided a new procedure for the hearing of complaints against clergy.

== Provisions ==
Section 1 of the act repealed the Clergy Act 1485 (1 Hen. 7. c. 4).

== Subsequent developments ==
The whole act was repealed by section 87 of, and the fifth schedule to, the Ecclesiastical Jurisdiction Measure 1963 (No. 1), which came into force on 1 March 1965.
