= Sale of Offices Act 1551 =

Act of the Parliament of England

Sale of Offices Act 1551 (Note: The citation of this act by this short title was authorised by section 1 of, and the first schedule to, the Short Titles Act 1896. Due to the repeal of those provisions it is now authorised by section 19(2) of the Interpretation Act 1978.)
- Act of Parliament
- Parliament of England
- Long title: An Act against buyinge and sellinge of offices. (Note: These words are printed against this act in the second column of the first schedule to the Short Titles Act 1896, which is headed "Title".)
- Citation: 5 & 6 Edw. 6. c. 16
- Territorial extent: England and Wales; Scotland; Ireland

Dates
- Royal assent: 15 April 1552
- Commencement: 23 January 1552 (Note: Start of session.)
- Repealed: 31 January 2013
Other legislation
Amended by	Sale of Offices Act 1809; Statute Law Revision Act 1863; Statute Revision Act (Ireland) 1872; Statute Law Revision Act 1888; Customs Law Repeal Act 1825; Statute Law Revision Act 1950
Repealed by	Statute Law (Repeals) Act 2013

Status: Repealed

Text of statute as originally enacted

Revised text of statute as amended

The Sale of Offices Act 1551 (5 & 6 Edw. 6. c. 16) was an act of the Parliament of England concerned with corruption in public office. It has been repealed completely in the United Kingdom since 2013, but only partly in the Republic of Ireland, where it makes it an offence to sell certain public offices, or to receive or agree to receive money for an office.

== Subsequent developments ==
The act was extended to Scotland and Ireland, and to all offices in the gift of the Crown, by section 1 of the Sale of Offices Act 1809 (49 Geo. 3. c. 126), now also repealed in the UK. The two acts had to be construed as one.

The act was repealed, from and after 5 July 1826, so far as regards the Revenue of Customs or Offices in the Service of the Customs, by sections 1 and 10 of the Customs Law Repeal Act 1825 (6 Geo. 4. c. 105).

Sections 5 and 6 of the act were repealed for England and Wales by section 1 of, and the schedule to, the Statute Law Revision Act 1863 (26 & 27 Vict. c. 125), which came into force on 28 July 1863.

Section 5 of the act was repealed for Ireland by section 1 of, and the schedule to, the Statute Law (Ireland) Revision Act 1872 (35 & 36 Vict. c. 98), which came into force on 10 August 1872.

Section 2 of the act, from "be it also" to "aforesaide", was repealed by section 1(1) of, and part I of the schedule to, the Statute Law Revision Act 1888 (51 & 52 Vict. c. 3), which came into force on 27 March 1888.

Section 3 of the act was repealed by section 1 of, and the first schedule to, the Statute Law Revision Act 1948 (11 & 12 Geo. 6. c. 62), which came into force on 30 July 1948.

Sections 5 and 6 were repealed for Northern Ireland by section 1(1) of, and the first schedule to, the Statute Law Revision Act 1950 (14 Geo. 6. c. 6), which came into force on 23 May 1950.

Sections 3, 5 and 6 of the act were repealed for the Republic of Ireland by section 1 of, and part III of the schedule to, the Statute Law Revision Act 1983, which came into force on 16 May 1983.

Parts of the act were retained for the Republic of Ireland by section 2(2)(a) of, and part 2 of schedule 1 to, the Statute Law Revision Act 2007, which came into force on 8 May 2007.

The whole act was repealed for the United Kingdom by section 1 of, and the group 7 of part 2 of the schedule to, the Statute Law (Repeals) Act 2013, which came into force on 31 January 2013.

See Graeme v Wroughton (1855) 11 Exch 146, (1855) 24 LJ Ex 265.

== See also ==
- Political corruption
