= Treason Act 1543 =

Act of the Parliament of England

Treason Act 1543 (Note: The citation of this act by this short title was authorised by section 5 of, and the second schedule to, the Statute Law Revision Act 1948. Due to the repeal of those provisions, it is now authorised by section 19(2) of the Interpretation Act 1978.)
- Act of Parliament
- Parliament of England
- Long title: An Acte concerninge the triall of Treasons commytted out of the Kinges Majesties Domynions. (Note: These words are printed against this act in the second column of the second schedule to the Statute Law Revision Act 1948, which is headed "Title".)
- Citation: 35 Hen. 8. c. 2
- Territorial extent: England and Wales

Dates
- Royal assent: 29 March 1544
- Commencement: 14 January 1544 (Note: Start of session.)
- Repealed: 1 January 1968
Other legislation
Amended by	Criminal Justice Act 1948
Repealed by	Criminal Law Act 1967
Relates to	Treasons Act 1534

Status: Repealed

Text of statute as originally enacted

The Treason Act 1543 (35 Hen. 8. c. 2) was an act of the Parliament of England passed during the reign of King Henry VIII of England, which stated that acts of treason or misprision of treason that were committed outside the realm of England could be tried within England. Those convicted of high treason would have their estates confiscated by the King and then be hanged, drawn and quartered.

The act received renewed attention in 1769, following protests against the Townshend Acts in colonial Boston. After determining that the act was still in effect, Parliament instructed Governor Francis Bernard of Massachusetts to gather evidence against Bostonians who might have committed acts of treason, so that they could be transported to England for trial. Colonial assemblies in British America passed resolutions against such an action, arguing that it would violate their constitutional right to a trial by jury of their peers.

No one in Massachusetts was arrested under the terms of the Treason Act, but the matter came up again in Rhode Island after the Gaspée Affair in 1772. Once again, officials were unable to obtain reliable evidence of treason.

== Repeal ==
The whole act was repealed by section 10(2) of, and part I of schedule 3 to, the Criminal Law Act 1967, which came into force on 1 January 1968.

== Other treason statutes passed in 1543 ==
King's Style Act 1543
- Act of Parliament
- Parliament of England
- Long title: An Act for the Ratification of the King's Majesty's Style.
- Citation: 35 Hen. 8. c. 3
- Territorial extent: England and Wales

Dates
- Royal assent: 29 March 1544
- Commencement: 14 January 1544 (Note: Start of session.)
- Repealed: 12 November 1554
Other legislation
Repealed by	Second Statute of Repeal

Status: Repealed

Text of statute as originally enacted

The act should not be confused with two other acts, the Succession to the Crown Act 1543 (35 Hen. 8. c. 1) and the King's Style Act 1543 (35 Hen. 8. c. 3), which were also about treason and were passed in the same year. The first made it treason to refuse to take an oath against the Pope. The second made it treason to attempt to deprive the king of his royal title or of his title as Defender of the Faith and as Supreme Head of the Church in England and Ireland. Both forms of treason were abolished in 1547 by the Treason Act 1547 (1 Edw. 6. c. 12) (Note: (The acts were repealed in 1554 by the See of Rome Act 1554 1 & 2 Ph. & M. c. 8.)), but the latter was revived in the first year of the reign of Elizabeth I by the Act of Supremacy 1558 (1 Eliz. 1. c. 1).

== See also ==
- High treason in the United Kingdom
- Treason Act
