= Holy Days and Fasting Days Act 1551 =

Act of the Parliament of England

Holy Days and Fasting Days Act 1551 (Note: The citation of this act by this short title was authorised by section 5 of, and the second schedule to, the Statute Law Revision Act 1948. Due to the repeal of those provisions, it is now authorised by section 19(2) of the Interpretation Act 1978.)
- Act of Parliament
- Parliament of England
- Long title: An Acte for the keping of Hollie daies and Fastinge dayes. (Note: These words are printed against this act in the second column of the second schedule to the Statute Law Revision Act 1948, which is headed "Title".)
- Citation: 5 & 6 Edw. 6. c. 3
- Territorial extent: England Wales

Dates
- Royal assent: 15 April 1552
- Commencement: 23 January 1552 (Note: Start of session.)
- Repealed: 1 January 1970

Other legislation
- Repealed by: Statute Law Revision Act 1888; Statute Law (Repeals) Act 1969

Status: Repealed

Text of statute as originally enacted

The Holy Days and Fasting Days Act 1551 (5 & 6 Edw. 6. c. 3) was an act of the Parliament of England.

It is sometimes claimed that this act is still in force, and attention is drawn to a portion of the act that states citizens must walk to a Christian church on Christmas Day. In reality, what had not already been repealed of this act in previous legislation was repealed by section 1 of, and part II of the schedule to, the Statute Law (Repeals) Act 1969.

== Subsequent developments ==
The following provisions were repealed by section 1(1) of, and part I of the schedule to, the Statute Law Revision Act 1888 (51 & 52 Vict. c. 3), which came into force on 27 March 1888.

- Section 2 of the act, from "it is also" to first "aforesaide".
- Section 3 of the act, from "it is enacted" to "abovesaide".
- Section 5 of the act, from "and it is" to first "aforesaide".
- Section 6 of the act, from "and it is" to first "aforesaide".
- Section 7 of the act, from "and be it" to "aforesaide".

The whole act, so far as unrepealed, was repealed by section 1 of, and part II of the schedule to, the Statute Law (Repeals) Act 1969, which came into force on 1 January 1970.

== See also ==
- Halsbury's Statutes
