= Ecclesiastical Jurisdiction Act 1531 =

Act of the Parliament of England

Ecclesiastical Jurisdiction Act 1531 (Note: The citation of this act by this short title was authorised by section 5 of, and the second schedule to, the Statute Law Revision Act 1948. Due to the repeal of those provisions, it is now authorised by section 19(2) of the Interpretation Act 1978.)
- Act of Parliament
- Parliament of England
- Long title: An Act that no personne shalbe cited oute of the Diocese where he or she dwelleth excepte in certayne cases. (Note: These words are printed against this act in the second column of the second schedule to the Statute Law Revision Act 1948, which is headed "Title".)
- Citation: 23 Hen. 8. c. 9
- Territorial extent: England and Wales

Dates
- Royal assent: 14 May 1532
- Commencement: 15 January 1532 (Note: Start of session.)
- Repealed: 1 March 1965
Other legislation
Amended by	Statute Law Revision Act 1888; Supreme Court of Judicature (Consolidation) Act 1925; Statute Law Revision Act 1948
Repealed by	Ecclesiastical Jurisdiction Measure 1963
Relates to	Church Discipline Act 1840

Status: Repealed

Text of statute as originally enacted

The Ecclesiastical Jurisdiction Act 1531 (23 Hen. 8. c. 9) was an act of the Parliament of England.

== Subsequent developments ==
The words "by accion of dette or accion upon the case", the words from "by originall writte of dette" to "shalbe admitted" where first occurring, and the words from "in whiche accion" where last occurring in section 1 of the act to the end of the section were repealed by section 1 of, and schedule 1 to, the Statute Law Revision Act 1948 (11 & 12 Geo. 6. c. 62)..

Section 4 of the act was repealed by section 1 of, and schedule 1 to, the Statute Law Revision Act 1948 (11 & 12 Geo. 6. c. 62)..

The whole act was repealed by section 87 of, and the fifth schedule to, the Ecclesiastical Jurisdiction Measure 1963 (No. 1), which came into force on 1 March 1965.
