= Clergy Marriage Act 1548 =

Act of the Parliament of England

Clergy Marriage Act 1548 (Note: The citation of this act by this short title was authorised by section 5 of, and the second schedule to, the Statute Law Revision Act 1948. Due to the repeal of those provisions, it is now authorised by section 19(2) of the Interpretation Act 1978.)
- Act of Parliament
- Parliament of England
- Long title: An Acte to take awaye all posityve Lawes againste Marriage of Priestes. (Note: These words are printed against this act in the second column of the second schedule to the Statute Law Revision Act 1948, which is headed "Title".)
- Citation: 2 & 3 Edw. 6. c. 21
- Territorial extent: England and Wales

Dates
- Royal assent: 14 March 1549
- Commencement: 24 November 1548 (Note: Start of session.)
- Repealed: 1 January 1970

Other legislation
- Amended by: Continuance, etc. of Laws Act 1603
- Repealed by: Statute Law Revision Act 1887; Statute Law Revision Act 1888; Statute Law (Repeals) Act 1969
- Relates to: Clergy Marriage Act 1551

Status: Repealed

Text of statute as originally enacted

The Clergy Marriage Act 1548 (2 & 3 Edw. 6. c. 21) was an act of the Parliament of England. Part of the English Reformation, it abolished the prohibition on marriage of priests within the Church of England. (Before Henry VIII declared himself Supreme Head of the Church of England, ecclesiastical matters were governed exclusively by Roman Catholic canon law, over which the English monarch had no authority.)

== Subsequent developments ==
The whole act was revived and made perpetual by section 8 of the Continuance, etc. of Laws Act 1603 (1 Jas. 1. c. 25).

Section 3 of the act was repealed by section 1 of, and the schedule to, the Statute Law Revision Act 1887 (50 & 51 Vict. c. 59), which came into force on 16 September 1887.

Section 2, from "and be it" to "aforesaide" was repealed by section 1(1) of, and part I of the schedule to, the Statute Law Revision Act 1888 (51 & 52 Vict. c. 3), which came into force on 27 March 1888.

The whole act, so far as unrepealed, was repealed by section 1 of, and part II of the schedule to, the Statute Law (Repeals) Act 1969, which came into force on 1 January 1970.

== See also ==
- Marriage Act
