= Clergy Marriage Act 1551 =

Act of the Parliament of England

Clergy Marriage Act 1551 (Note: The citation of this act by this short title was authorised by section 5 of, and the second schedule to, the Statute Law Revision Act 1948. Due to the repeal of those provisions, it is now authorised by section 19(2) of the Interpretation Act 1978.)
- Act of Parliament
- Parliament of England
- Long title: An Acte for the declaracion of a Statute made for the Marriage of Priestes and for the legittimacion of their Children. (Note: These words are printed against this act in the second column of the second schedule to the Statute Law Revision Act 1948, which is headed "Title".)
- Citation: 5 & 6 Edw. 6. c. 12
- Territorial extent: England and Wales

Dates
- Royal assent: 15 April 1552
- Commencement: 23 January 1552 (Note: Start of session.)
- Repealed: 1 January 1970

Other legislation
- Amended by: Continuance, etc. of Laws Act 1603
- Repealed by: Statute Law Revision Act 1887; Administration of Estates Act 1925; Statute Law (Repeals) Act 1969
- Relates to: Clergy Marriage Act 1548

Status: Repealed

Text of statute as originally enacted

The Clergy Marriage Act 1551 (5 & 6 Edw. 6. c. 12) was an act of the Parliament of England. The act formally legalised the marriage of priests and legitimised their children. It voided all previous Catholic-imposed restrictions on clerical marriage but was subsequently repealed in 1553 during the reign of Mary I.

== Subsequent developments ==
The whole act was revived and made perpetual by section 8 of the Continuance, etc. of Laws Act 1603 (1 Jas. 1. c. 25), which came into force on 19 March 1604.

Section 4 of the act was repealed by section 1 of, and the schedule to, the Statute Law Revision Act 1887 (50 & 51 Vict. c. 59), which came into force on 16 September 1887.

Section 2 of the act was repealed by section 56 of, and part I of schedule 2 to, the Administration of Estates Act 1925 (15 & 16 Geo. 5. c. 23), which came into force on 1 January 1926.

The whole act, so far as unrepealed, was repealed by section 1 of, and part II of the schedule to, the Statute Law (Repeals) Act 1969, which came into force on 1 January 1970.

== See also ==
- Marriage Act
