= Impotence and marriage =

Legal effects of erectile dysfunction on marriage

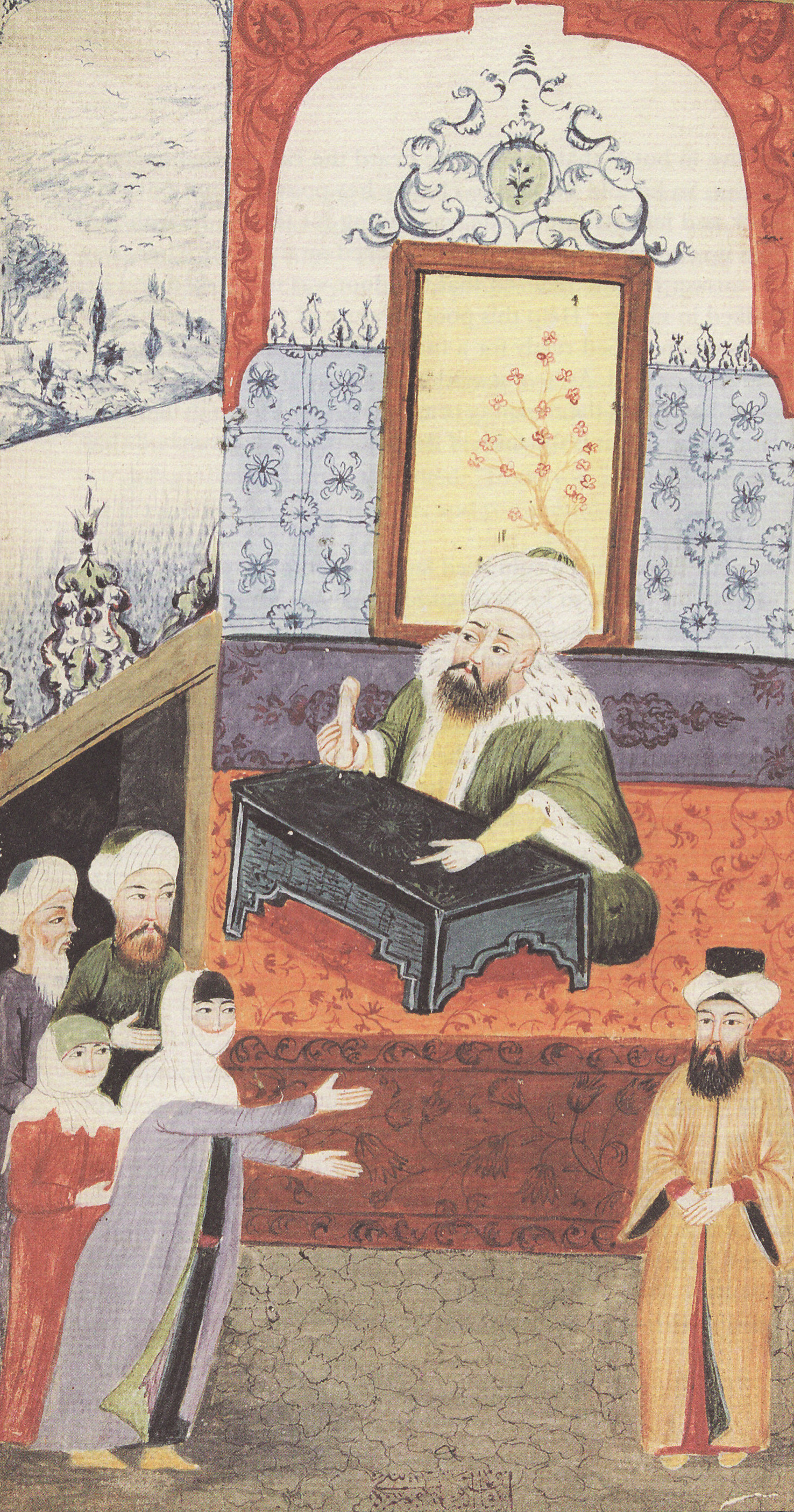
An unhappy wife is complaining to the qadi about her husband's impotence. Ottoman miniature.

Historically marriage was seen as primarily existing for the purpose of procreation. Thus inability of a man to consummate marriage by having vaginal sex was a ground for declaring marriage as void.

== By religion ==
=== Catholic Church ===
Per Canon 1084 §3 "Without prejudice to the provisions of Canon 1098, sterility- the absolute or probable inability to have children due to defects or abnormalities in the reproductive organs or other associated organs, or of the germ cells (the ova and sperm), neither forbids nor invalidates a marriage." Both parties, however, must be physically capable of completed vaginal intercourse, wherein the man ejaculates "true semen", even if the amount is small and/or if there are no viable sperm, into the woman's vagina (even if the cervix or uterus are absent, the ova are absent or non-viable, or the vagina is deformed). (See for details.) To invalidate a marriage, the impotence must be perpetual (i.e., incurable) and antecedent to the marriage. The impotence can either be absolute or relative. This impediment is generally considered to derive from divine natural law, and so cannot be dispensed. The reason behind this impediment is explained in the Summa Theologica: "In marriage there is a contract whereby one is bound to pay the other the marital debt: wherefore just as in other contracts, the bond is unfitting if a person bind himself to what he cannot give or do, so the marriage contract is unfitting, if it be made by one who cannot pay the marital debt."

== By country ==
=== France ===
During the late 16th and 17th centuries in France, male impotence was considered a crime, as well as legal grounds for a divorce. The practice involved so-called "trial by congress" during which a panel made of clergy and medical professionals inspected man's ability to perform sexual acts.

There are multiple known cases of such trials between 1426 and 1712. In 1603 Jacques de Sales claimed his wife took his potency by means of magic. They were granted annulment of marriage. Marquis de Langey in 1657 was declared impotent by court and his wife was granted a divorce. In 1712 Marquis de Gesvers also was sued, but his wife died before the trial was concluded. Between 1726 and 1789 there were 25 known impotence trials, 22 of them involving men and three women.

=== Spain ===
Multiple trials to grant annulment for divorce the grounds of both male and female impotency were held in Spain between 1650 and 1750.

== Summary of current laws ==
=== Impotence makes marriage automatically void ===
- Mexico
- Vatican

=== Impotence is a ground for declaring marriage voidable ===
- Canada
  - Alberta
  - British Columbia (can include incapability to consummate with specific person, case law)
  - Ontario (case law)
- India
- Ireland
- Kenya (not directly mentioned, but may be voided if not consummated)
- Malta
- Nigeria
- Philippines
- Tanzania
- Uganda
- United Kingdom (excluding same-sex couples)
- United States
  - California
  - Idaho
  - Michigan
  - Mississippi
  - Nebraska
  - North Dakota
  - West Virginia

=== Impotence is a ground for declaring marriage voidable only if not disclosed before the marriage ===
- South Africa
- United States
  - Colorado
  - Connecticut
  - Delaware
  - Florida (case law)
  - Illinois
  - Kentucky
  - Minnesota
  - Montana
  - New Jersey
  - New York
  - Texas
  - Wisconsin

=== Impotence is not a ground for declaring marriage void ===
- Australia
- Canada
  - Quebec
- France
- Japan
- New Zealand
- Poland

== See also ==
- Marriage law
- Erectile dysfunction
