= Sacrament Act 1547 =

Act of the Parliament of England

Sacrament Act 1547 (Note: The citation of this act by this short title was authorised by section 5 of, and the second schedule to, the Statute Law Revision Act 1948. Due to the repeal of those provisions, it is now authorised by section 19(2) of the Interpretation Act 1978.)
- Act of Parliament
- Parliament of England
- Long title: An Acte against suche as shall unreverentlie speake against the Sacrament of the bodie and bloude of Christe commonlie called the Sacrament of the Altar, and for the receiving thereof in bothe kyndes. (Note: These words are printed against this act in the second column of the second schedule to the Statute Law Revision Act 1948, which is headed "Title".)
- Citation: 1 Edw. 6. c. 1
- Territorial extent: England and Wales

Dates
- Royal assent: 24 December 1547
- Commencement: 4 November 1547 (Note: Start of session.)
Other legislation
Amended by	Statute Law Revision Act 1888; Statute Law Revision Act 1948; Statute Law Revision Act 1953; Criminal Law Act 1967; Statute Law (Repeals) Act 1969

Status: Amended

Text of statute as originally enacted

Revised text of statute as amended

Text of the Sacrament Act 1547 as in force today (including any amendments) within the United Kingdom, from legislation.gov.uk.

The Sacrament Act 1547 (1 Edw. 6. c. 1) is an act of the Parliament of England.

As of 2025, section 8 of the act was partly in force in England and Wales.

== Provisions ==
=== Section 8 ===
Primitive Mode of receiving the Sacrament; The Sacrament shall be administered in both Kinds, Bread and Wine, to the People: After Exhortations of the Priest, the Sacrament shall not be denied. Not condemning the Usage of other Churches.

== Subsequent developments ==
In section 1 of the act, the words from "from and after" to "nexte cominge" were repealed by section 1 of, and the first schedule to, the Statute Law Revision Act 1948 (11 & 12 Geo. 6. c. 62), which came into force on 30 July 1948.

In section 2 of the act, the words to "Maie next coming" and "whereof one of them to be of the quorum" and the words "after the saide first daie of Maye" were repealed by section 1 of, and the first schedule to, the Statute Law Revision Act 1948 (11 & 12 Geo. 6. c. 62).

Section 8 of the act was repealed for Northern Ireland by section 1 of, and schedule 1 to, the Statute Law Revision Act 1953 (2 & 3 Eliz. 2. c. 5, which 1953.

Sections 2, 4, 5 and 7 of the act were repealed by section 10(2) of, and part I of schedule 3 to, the Criminal Law Act 1967, which came into force on 1 January 1968.

Section 3 of the act was repealed by section 10(3) of, and part II of schedule 2 to, the Criminal Procedure (Attendance of Witnesses) Act 1965.

The whole act, so far as unrepealed, except section 8, was repealed by section 1 of, and part II of the schedule to, the Statute Law (Repeals) Act 1969, which came into force on 1 January 1970.
