= Marriage (Wales) Act 2010 =

Act of the Parliament of the United Kingdom

Marriage (Wales) Act 2010 (Note: Section 6(1).)
- Act of Parliament
- Parliament of the United Kingdom
- Long title: An Act to enable persons to be married in a place of worship in a parish in the Church in Wales with which they have a qualifying connection; and for connected purposes.
- Citation: 2010 c. 6
- Introduced by: Alun Michael (Commons); Lord Rowe-Beddoe (Lords)
- Territorial extent: England and Wales (Note: Section 6(3). By section 1, the act applies only to parishes in the area subject to the Welsh Church Act 1914.)

Dates
- Royal assent: 18 March 2010
- Commencement: 18 March 2010 (Note: Section 6(2).)

Status: Current legislation

Text of statute as originally enacted

Text of the Marriage (Wales) Act 2010 as in force today (including any amendments) within the United Kingdom, from legislation.gov.uk.

The Marriage (Wales) Act 2010 (c. 6) is an act of the Parliament of the United Kingdom. Introduced as a private member's bill by David Rowe-Beddoe, Baron Rowe-Beddoe and sponsored by Alun Michael MP, it received royal assent on 18 March 2010. It mirrored the Church of England Marriage Measure 2008 for the Church in Wales, bringing the Church in Wales's marriage regulations into line with those of the Church of England.

== Background ==
The Church in Wales had been disestablished from the Church of England since 1920 following the Welsh Church Act 1914. It had the effect of severing the Church in Wales's links with the canon law of the Church of England. This meant that any measures passed by the Church of England no longer had legal force over the Church in Wales. Any changes made to the Church in Wales's legal situations must be made via an act of Parliament, as the Senedd has no jurisdiction over ecclesiastical law or marriage law because those are reserved matters.

Prior to the act, when two people wished to marry in Wales, ordinarily, at least one of them would have to live in the parish where they would get married or have attended the parish church for the previous six months. The act allowed couples to use a parent's residency or regular attendance in the specific church as a valid condition to be married in that parish; or for the church to have been the place where one of the parties to the marriage had been baptised or confirmed; or for the church to have been where a parent or grandparent of one of the parties to the marriage had been married.

== History ==
Coat of arms of the Church in Wales

In 2008, the General Synod of the Church of England passed the Church of England Marriage Measure 2008, which extended the rights of marriage within their churches to allow people to marry in churches where they had been christened or confirmed as well as in churches where any of their parents or grandparents had been married. This led to the Church in Wales being out of step with the Church of England, as the Measure only applied to the Church of England, and the Church in Wales continued to use the old requirements of either residency in the parish or regular church attendance for the previous six months. As the Church in Wales Governing Body's actions have no legal force in English law, legislation from Parliament was required to bring the Church in Wales into line with the Church of England.

In 2009, the Governing Body debated and accepted Private Members' Motion (No 09/13), which requested that the Church in Wales take steps to bring the church's marriage regulations into line with those of the Church of England. The Marriage (Wales) Bill was drafted by the Governing Body of the Church in Wales and brought forward into Parliament as a private member's bill in the House of Lords by the chairman of the Representative Body of the Church in Wales, Lord Rowe-Beddoe. The text was drafted by the Church in Wales' Governing Body. It passed through the House of Lords without amendment. In the House of Commons, the bill was sponsored by the Labour Co-operative Member of Parliament, Alun Michael. The act received royal assent on 18 March 2010, before the dissolution of Parliament. The Marriage (Wales) Act 2010 was viewed by academics as being an example of a disestablished church enjoying the privileges of establishment but without the legal ability to self-regulate itself and requiring primary legislation to make desired changes.

== See also ==
- Marriage Act
