= Marriage Act 1994 =

Act of the Parliament of the United Kingdom

Marriage Act 1994 (Note: Section 3(1).)
- Act of Parliament
- Parliament of the United Kingdom
- Long title: An Act to amend the Marriage Act 1949 so as to enable civil marriages to be solemnized on premises approved for the purpose by local authorities and so as to provide for further cases in which marriages may be solemnized in registration districts in which neither party to the marriage resides; and for connected purposes.
- Citation: 1994 c. 34
- Introduced by: Gyles Brandreth (Commons)
- Territorial extent: United Kingdom

Dates
- Royal assent: 3 November 1994
- Commencement: various (Note: Section 3(2).)
Other legislation
Amends	Marriage Act 1949; Marriage (Registrar General’s Licence) Act 1970

Status: Amended

Text of statute as originally enacted

Revised text of statute as amended

Text of the Marriage Act 1994 as in force today (including any amendments) within the United Kingdom, from legislation.gov.uk.

The Marriage Act 1994 (c. 34) is an act of the Parliament of the United Kingdom. Introduced as a private member's bill by Gyles Brandreth, it amended the Marriage Act 1949 (12, 13 & 14 Geo. 6. c. 76) to allow civil marriages to be solemnized in certain "approved premises". Prior to the act, marriage ceremonies could only be conducted in churches and register offices. "Approved premises", for the purpose of the act, include publicly available premises which are "readily identifiable" as marriage venues, support the "dignity of marriage", and do not have any official connections with any religion or religious institution. The majority of these approved premises are hotels, as well as stately homes, restaurants, and leisure clubs. The act also allows couples to marry in registration districts in which neither member of the couple resides.

Following the passage of the act, the proportion of civil marriages performed in approved premises in the United Kingdom increased from 1% of all marriages in 1995 to 6% in 1997.

== Approved premise ==
An approved premise is a buildings or other location that is permitted to be used for civil partnerships and civil marriages under the act. A building or location can be given the approved premise mark by having their location be verified by the superintendent registrar of that area.

The wedding of Prince Charles and Camilla Parker Bowles in April 2005 was initially due to take place at Windsor Castle, but was moved a few weeks before to the Windsor Guildhall after it was discovered that, under regulations made under the 1994 act, if the castle was licensed as an approved premise, members of the public would have been able to access the ceremony, and the castle would have needed to be open to any wedding for the next three years.
