= Marriage Act 1540 =

Act of the Parliament of England

Marriage Act 1540 (Note: The citation of this act by this short title was authorised by section 5 of, and the second schedule to, the Statute Law Revision Act 1948. Due to the repeal of those provisions, it is now authorised by section 19(2) of the Interpretation Act 1978.)
- Act of Parliament
- Parliament of England
- Long title: Concerning precontractes and degrees of Consanguinite. (Note: These words are printed against this act in the second column of the second schedule to the Statute Law Revision Act 1948, which is headed "Title".)
- Citation: 32 Hen. 8. c. 38
- Territorial extent: England and Wales; Isle of Man

Dates
- Royal assent: 24 July 1540
- Commencement: 1 July 1540 (Note: Section 1.)
- Repealed: England and Wales: 1 January 1950; Isle of Man: 25 July 1991

Other legislation
- Repealed by: England and Wales: Marriage Act 1949; Isle of Man: Statute Law Revision (Isle of Man) Act 1991
- Relates to: Marriage Act 1542; Marriages (Pre-contract) Act 1548

Status: Repealed

Text of statute as originally enacted

The Marriage Act 1540 (32 Hen. 8. c. 38) was an act of the Parliament of England. A similar Marriage Act, 1542 was passed by the Parliament of Ireland, and part of it remains in force in the Republic of Ireland.

== Subsequent developments ==
The whole act was repealed for England and Wales by section 79(1) of, and part I of schedule 5 to, the Marriage Act 1949 (12, 13 & 14 Geo. 6. c. 76), which came into force on 1 January 1950.

The whole act was repealed for the Isle of Man by section 1(2) of, and schedule 2 to, the Statute Law Revision (Isle of Man) Act 1991, which came into force on 25 July 1991.

== See also ==
- Marriage Act
