= List of acts of the Parliament of England from 1551 =

This is a list of acts of the Parliament of England for the year 1551.

For acts passed during the period 1707–1800, see the list of acts of the Parliament of Great Britain. See also the list of acts of the Parliament of Scotland, and the list of acts of the Parliament of Ireland.

For acts passed from 1801 onwards, see the list of acts of the Parliament of the United Kingdom. For acts of the devolved parliaments and assemblies in the United Kingdom, see the list of acts of the Scottish Parliament, the list of acts of the Northern Ireland Assembly, and the list of acts and measures of Senedd Cymru; see also the list of acts of the Parliament of Northern Ireland.

For medieval statutes, etc. that are not considered to be acts of Parliament, see the list of English statutes.

See also the List of ordinances and acts of the Parliament of England, 1642–1660 for ordinances and acts passed by the Long Parliament and other bodies without royal assent, and which were not considered to be valid legislation following the Restoration in 1660.

The number shown after each act's title is its chapter number. Acts are cited using this number, preceded by the years of the reign during which the relevant parliamentary session was held; thus the Union with Ireland Act 1800 is cited as "39 & 40 Geo. 3. c. 67", meaning the 67th act passed during the session that started in the 39th year of the reign of George III and which finished in the 40th year of that reign. The modern convention is to use Arabic numerals in citations (thus "41 Geo. 3" rather than "41 Geo. III"). Acts of the last session of the Parliament of Great Britain and the first session of the Parliament of the United Kingdom are both cited as "41 Geo. 3".

Acts passed by the Parliament of England did not have a short title; however, some of these acts have subsequently been given a short title by acts of the Parliament of the United Kingdom, such as the Short Titles Act 1896 (59 & 60 Vict. c. 14).

Acts passed by the Parliament of England were deemed to have come into effect on the first day of the session in which they were passed. Because of this, the years given in the list below may in fact be the year before a particular act was passed.

== 5 & 6 Edw. 6 ==
The fourth session of the 1st Parliament of King Edward VI, which met from 23 January 1552 until 15 April 1552.

This session was also traditionally cited as 5 & 6 Ed. 6.

=== Public acts ===
Short title	Citation	Royal assent
Long title
Act of Uniformity 1551 or the Act of Uniformity 1552 or the Uniformity Act 1551 (repealed)	5 & 6 Edw. 6. c. 1	15 April 1552
An Act for the Uniformity of Common Prayer, and Administration of the Sacraments. (Repealed for Northern Ireland by Statute Law Revision Act 1950 (14 Geo. 6. c. 6)) and for England and Wales by Statute Law (Repeals) Act 1969 (c. 52))
Poor Act 1551 (repealed)	5 & 6 Edw. 6. c. 2	15 April 1552
An Act for the Provision and Relief of the Poor. (Repealed by Statute Law Revision Act 1863 (26 & 27 Vict. c. 125))
Holy Days and Fasting Days Act 1551 (repealed)	5 & 6 Edw. 6. c. 3	15 April 1552
An Act for the keeping Holidays and Fasting Days. (Repealed by Statute Law Revision Act 1888 (51 & 52 Vict. c. 3) and Statute Law (Repeals) Act 1969 (c. 52))
Brawling Act 1551 (repealed)	5 & 6 Edw. 6. c. 4	15 April 1552
An Act against Fighting and Quarrelling in Churches and Church-Yards. (Repealed by Ecclesiastical Jurisdiction Measure 1963 (No. 1))
Tillage Act 1551 (repealed)	5 & 6 Edw. 6. c. 5	15 April 1552
An Act for the Maintenance of Tillage, and Increase of Corn. (Repealed by Continuance, etc. of Laws Act 1623 (21 Jas. 1. c. 28))
Woollen Cloth Act 1551 (repealed)	5 & 6 Edw. 6. c. 6	15 April 1552
An Act for the true making of Woolen Cloth. (Repealed by Repeal of Obsolete Statutes Act 1856 (19 & 20 Vict. c. 64))
Wool Act 1551 (repealed)	5 & 6 Edw. 6. c. 7	15 April 1552
An Act, limiting the Times for buying and selling of Wools. (Repealed by Continuance, etc. of Laws Act 1623 (21 Jas. 1. c. 28))
Woollen Cloth (No. 2) Act 1551 (repealed)	5 & 6 Edw. 6. c. 8	15 April 1552
An Act limiting what Persons shall weave or make Broad Woollen Cloth. (Repealed by Statute Law Revision Act 1863 (26 & 27 Vict. c. 125))
Robbery Act 1551 (repealed)	5 & 6 Edw. 6. c. 9	15 April 1552
An Act, That no Man robbing any House, Booth, or Tent, shall be admitted to the Benefit of his Clergy. (Repealed for England and Wales by Criminal Statutes Repeal Act 1827 (7 & 8 Geo. 4. c. 27) and for India by Criminal Law (India) Act 1828 (9 Geo. 4. c. 74))
Robbery (No. 2) Act 1551 (repealed)	5 & 6 Edw. 6. c. 10	15 April 1552
An Act to take away the Benefit of Clergy from such as rob in one Shire, and flee into another. (Repealed by Criminal Law Act 1826 (7 Geo. 4. c. 64))
Treason Act 1551 (repealed)	5 & 6 Edw. 6. c. 11	15 April 1552
An Acte for the punyshment of diverse Treasons. (Repealed by Statute Law Revision Act 1948 (11 & 12 Geo. 6. c. 62))
Clergy Marriage Act 1551 (repealed)	5 & 6 Edw. 6. c. 12	15 April 1552
An Acte for the declaracion of a Statute made for the Marriage of Priestes and for the legittimacion of their Children. (Repealed by Statute Law Revision Act 1887 (50 & 51 Vict. c. 59), Administration of Estates Act 1925 (15 & 16 Geo. 5. c. 23), Statute Law (Repeals) Act 1969 (c. 52))
Monasteries, etc. Act 1551 (repealed)	5 & 6 Edw. 6. c. 13	15 April 1552
An Act for Declaration of a Statute made in the 21st Year of King Henry the Eighth, touching Religious Persons. (Repealed by Statute Law Revision Act 1863 (26 & 27 Vict. c. 125))
Forestallers Act 1551 (repealed)	5 & 6 Edw. 6. c. 14	15 April 1552
An Act against Regrators, Forestallers and Ingrossers. (Repealed by Repeal of Certain Laws Act 1772 (12 Geo. 3. c. 71))
Regratours of Tanned Leather Act 1551 (repealed)	5 & 6 Edw. 6. c. 15	15 April 1552
An Act against Regrators of Tanned Leather. (Repealed by Forestalling, Regrating, etc. Act 1844 (7 & 8 Vict. c. 24) and Statute Law Revision Act 1953 (2 & 3 Eliz. 2. c. 5))
Sale of Offices Act 1551 (repealed)	5 & 6 Edw. 6. c. 16	15 April 1552
An Act against buyinge and sellinge of offices. (Repealed by Statute Law (Repeals) Act 2013 (c. 2))
Continuance of Laws Act 1551 (repealed)	5 & 6 Edw. 6. c. 17	15 April 1552
An Act for the Continuance of certain Acts. (Repealed by Statute Law Revision Act 1863 (26 & 27 Vict. c. 125))
Navigation Act 1551 (repealed)	5 & 6 Edw. 6. c. 18	15 April 1552
An Act repealing a Statute made in the Fourth Year of King Henry the Seventh, against the bringing in of Wine and Wood in strange Bottoms. (Note: Importations, etc. Act 1488 (4 Hen. 7. c. 10)) (Repealed by Repeal of Acts Concerning Importation Act 1822 (3 Geo. 4. c. 41))
Money Act 1551 (repealed)	5 & 6 Edw. 6. c. 19	15 April 1552
An Act touching the Exchange of Gold and Silver. (Repealed by Coinage Offences Act 1832 (2 & 3 Will. 4. c. 34)
Usury Act 1551 (repealed)	5 & 6 Edw. 6. c. 20	15 April 1552
An Act against Usury. (Repealed by Usury Act 1571 (13 Eliz. 1. c. 8))
Pedlars Act 1551 (repealed)	5 & 6 Edw. 6. c. 21	15 April 1552
An Act against Tinkers and Pedlars. (Repealed by Continuance, etc. of Laws Act 1603 (1 Jas. 1. c. 25))
Gig Mills Act 1551 (repealed)	5 & 6 Edw. 6. c. 22	15 April 1552
An Act for the putting down of Gigg-Mills. (Repealed by Woollen Manufacture Act 1809 (49 Geo. 3. c. 109))
Stuffing of Feather Beds, etc. Act 1551 (repealed)	5 & 6 Edw. 6. c. 23	15 April 1552
An Act for the true stussing of Feather Beds, Bolsters, Mattrasses, and Cushions. (Repealed by Statute Law Revision Act 1863 (26 & 27 Vict. c. 125))
Making of Hats, etc. Act 1551 (repealed)	5 & 6 Edw. 6. c. 24	15 April 1552
An Act for the making of Hats, Dornykes, and Coverlets, at Norwiche, and in the County of Norff. (Repealed by Repeal of Obsolete Statutes Act 1856 (19 & 20 Vict. c. 64))
Ale Houses Act 1551 or the Licensing Act 1551 (repealed)	5 & 6 Edw. 6. c. 25	15 April 1552
An Act for Keepers of Ale-houses to be bound by Recognisances. (Repealed by Alehouse Act 1828 (9 Geo. 4. c. 61))
Proclamations and Exigents (Lancaster) Act 1551 (repealed)	5 & 6 Edw. 6. c. 26	15 April 1552
An Act for Writs upon Proclamations and Exigents to be current within the County Palatine of Lancastre. (Repealed by Administration of Justice (Miscellaneous Provisions) Act 1938 (1 & 2 Geo. 6. c. 63))

=== Private acts ===
Short title	Citation	Royal assent
Long title
Assurance of manor of Merevale (Warwickshire) and other lands to Sir William Devereux.	5 & 6 Edw. 6. c. 1 Pr.	15 April 1552
An Act for the Assurance of the Manor of Merryvall, in the County of Warwyke, to William Devereux, during his Life.
Assurance of lands sold by the King to the City of London.	5 & 6 Edw. 6. c. 2 Pr.	15 April 1552
An Act for the Assurance of certain Lands sold by the King's Majesty to the Mayor and City of London.
Restitution of the heirs of Sir John Nevill.	5 & 6 Edw. 6. c. 3 Pr.	15 April 1552
An Act for the Restitution in Blood of the Heirs of Sir John Nevyll.
Marquis of Northampton's Marriage Act 1551 (repealed)	5 & 6 Edw. 6. c. 4 Pr.	15 April 1552
An Act touching the Marriage and Inheritance of the Lord Marquis of Northampton, and Lady Elizabeth his Wife. (Repealed by Marquis of Northampton's Marriage Confirmation Repeal Act 1553 (1 Mar. Sess. 2. c. 12))
Restitution in blood of Sir John Fortescue.	5 & 6 Edw. 6. c. 5 Pr.	15 April 1552
An Act for the Restitution in Blood of John Forteskue.
Assurance of Lady Abergavenny's jointure.	5 & 6 Edw. 6. c. 6 Pr.	15 April 1552
An Act for the Assurance of the Lady Burgavenye's Jointure.
Denization of wives and children of Edward Allen, John Rogers, John Madwell and James Bylney.	5 & 6 Edw. 6. c. 7 Pr.	15 April 1552
An Act for making Denizens the Wives and Children of Edmonde Allen, John Rogers, John Madwell, and James Bylneye.
Foundation of Pocklington Grammar School (Yorkshire).	5 & 6 Edw. 6. c. 8 Pr.	15 April 1552
An Act for the Establishment of a Grammar School at Pokelington, in the County of Yorcke.
Frustration of assurance of lands to Duke of Somerset by Earl of Oxford.	5 & 6 Edw. 6. c. 9 Pr.	15 April 1552
An Act for the undoing and annulling of certain Assurances and Conveyances of Lands made to the late Duke of Somersett by the Earl of Oxforde.
Erection of the Cathedral Church of St. Peter of Westminster, and uniting it to the jurisdiction of the Bishop of London.	5 & 6 Edw. 6. c. 10 Pr.	15 April 1552
An Act for the New Erection of the Cathedral Church of St. Peter's at Westm. and for the Uniting of the same to the Jurisdiction of the Bishop of London.
Limitation of the late Edward, Duke of Somerset's estate.	5 & 6 Edw. 6. c. 11 Pr.	15 April 1552
An Act for the Limitation of the late Duke of Somersett's Lands.

=== Sources ===
- "5° & 6° Edw. VI". The Statutes of the Realm. Vol. 4 Part 1: 1547 to 1584. pp. 129–159 – via Internet Archive.
- "5° & 6° Edw. VI". The Statutes of the Realm. Vol. 4 Part 1: 1547 to 1584. pp. 129–159 – via HathiTrust.
- "5° & 6° Edw. VI". The Statutes of the Realm. Vol. 4 Part 1: 1547 to 1584. pp. 129–159 – via Google Books.
- "Anno quinto & sexto Edw. VI". The Statutes at Large. Vol. 5 – 32 Henry VIII to 7 Edward VI – 1540 to 1552–3. pp. 348–395 – via Internet Archive.
- Journal of the House of Commons. Vol. 1 – 1547-1629. His Majesty's Stationery Office. 1802 – via British History Online.
- Journal of the House of Lords. Vol. 1: 1509-1577. London: His Majesty's Stationery Office. 1830 – via British History Online.
- "Acts of the English Parliament from 1551". legislation.gov.uk. The National Archives.
- Chronological Table of and Index to the Statutes. Vol. 1: To the End of the Session 59 Vict. Sess. 2 (1895) (13th ed.). London: Her Majesty's Stationery Office. 1896. p. 56 – via Google Books.
- Chronological Table of the Statutes: Covering the Period from 1235 to the End of 1971. London: Her Majesty's Stationery Office. 1972. pp. 53–54. ISBN 978-0-11-840096-1 – via Google Books.
- "Chronological Tables of the Private and Personal Acts: Part 1 (1539–1601)". legislation.gov.uk. The National Archives.

== See also ==
- List of acts of the Parliament of England
