= Voidable marriage =

Valid and cancellable arrangement

A voidable marriage (also called an avoidable marriage) is a marriage that can be canceled at the option of one of the parties through annulment. The marriage is valid but is subject to cancellation if contested in court by one of the parties to the marriage.

A voidable marriage is contrasted with a void marriage, which is one that is on its face unlawful and therefore legally has no effect, whether or not one of the parties challenges the marriage.

== History ==
The concept of "voidable marriage" arose from the early ecclesiastical courts which had jurisdiction to determine what constituted a valid marriage. Some of the recognized impediments were subsumed into the civil courts which had jurisdiction over the right to and disposition of property.

Common reasons that would make a marriage voidable include those that indicate either party to the marriage did not validly consent, such as duress, mistake, intoxication, or mental defect.

The validity of a voidable marriage can only be made by one of the parties to the marriage; thus, a voidable marriage cannot be annulled after the death of one of the parties.

== See also ==
- Impotence and marriage
- Voidable
