= Church of England Marriage Measure 2008 =

Church of England measure

- Measure of the Church of England
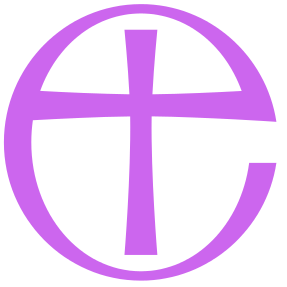
- General Synod of the Church of England
- Long title: A Measure passed by the General Synod of the Church of England to enable persons to be married in a place of worship in a parish with which they have a qualifying connection; and for connected purposes.
- Citation: 2008 No. 1
- Territorial extent: England

Dates
- Royal assent: 28 May 2008

Other legislation
- Amended by: Church of England Marriage (Amendment) Measure 2012

Status: Amended

Text of the Church of England Marriage Measure 2008 as in force today (including any amendments) within the United Kingdom, from legislation.gov.uk.

The Church of England Marriage Measure 2008 (No. 1) is a Church of England measure passed by the General Synod of the Church of England extending the right to marry in a Church of England church to parish churches with which a person has a qualifying connection.

== Effects ==
Previously, people had the right to be married in a Church of England parish church only if they were resident in the parish for six months or if they regularly worshipped there. In order to marry in another church, the couple would have to obtain a special licence from the Archbishop of Canterbury, which was not automatically given.

The Church of England Marriage Measure was introduced to extend the rights for people to marry in churches. The Measure allows a couple to be married in a church of their choice if one of them has a "qualifying connection" to it, such as being baptised or confirmed there. The Measure also grants them the right to marry in parishes in which their parents lived or regularly worshipped, or where their parents or grandparents had been married. However, this right does not extend to cathedrals.

== Passage ==
The Measure was passed by the General Synod of the Church of England and passed through Parliament, receiving royal assent from the Supreme Governor of the Church of England, Queen Elizabeth II on 28 May 2008. Concerns were expressed at the time that it would lead to "wedding tourism". Within two years of its introduction, marriages in the Church of England rose by 4% as a result. The approach of the Measure was mirrored in the Marriage (Wales) Act 2010, bringing the position of the disestablished Church in Wales in line with the Church of England.

== Amendment ==
The Church of England Marriage (Amendment) Measure 2012 amended the 2008 measure in a number of ways, the two main ways being:

- more modern terminology can be used in the publication of banns - instead of "cause or just impediment" as stated in the Book of Common Prayer, "any reason in law why they may not marry each other" can be used as it is phrased in Common Worship: Pastoral Services.
- banns can be published on at least three Sundays at the "principal service" rather than specifically the morning service which was the previous position, and allows the publication of banns at any other service in addition to those Sundays.
