= Void marriage =

Unlawful or invalid marriage

A void marriage is a marriage that is unlawful or invalid under the laws of the jurisdiction where it is entered. A void marriage is invalid from its beginning, and is generally treated under the law as if it never existed and requires no formal action to terminate. In some jurisdictions a void marriage must still be terminated by annulment, or an annulment may be required to remove any legal impediment to a subsequent marriage. A marriage that is entered into in good faith, but that is later found to be void, may be recognized as a putative marriage and the spouses as putative spouses, with certain rights granted by statute or common law, notwithstanding that the marriage itself is void.

Void marriages are distinct from those marriages that can be canceled at the option of one of the parties, but otherwise remain valid. Such a marriage is voidable, meaning that it is subject to cancellation through annulment if contested in court.

== History ==
According to Paul J. Goda, the distinction between void and voidable marriages arose in the context of a jurisdictional dispute between the civil and ecclesiastical courts. The civil courts held jurisdiction over property matters, while the church retained jurisdictions over the validity of marriages. There was an overlap in cases of inheritance where it was necessary to determine the legitimacy of putative heirs. With the Reformation, the focus shifted from marriage as a religious matter to that of a civil contract, according to Goda: "Early American courts accepted the distinction between canonical and civil disabilities as the rationale for void (civilly disabled) and voidable (canonically disabled) marriages." Colonial courts followed the Common Law view in looking to the capacity of the parties to enter into a legally binding contract.

== Criteria ==
In general, a marriage is void (as opposed to voidable) if:

- The parties' degree of consanguinity is too close – for example, a brother and sister or a parent and a child. Different jurisdictions have different lists of prohibited incestuous relationship.
- A party to the marriage is forbidden to marry as a result of losing their civil rights, such as for conviction of a crime.
- The form of the marriage is forbidden by statute – such as same-sex marriage (in some jurisdictions) or group marriage. Attempts to espouse a Ford motorcar or a "porn-filled Apple computer" have been dismissed as void.
- There is a pre-existing marriage by at least one of the parties, and the subsequent marriage may also constitute a crime of bigamy.
- One or both of the parties are under the age of marriage, or were under it at the time of marriage.

Most jurisdictions recognise the validity of marriages performed in another jurisdiction. However, a jurisdiction where the parties to the marriage normally reside may not recognise a "foreign" marriage. A court may find a marriage void ab initio when it is shown that the marriage is incestuous, polygamous, a same-sex marriage in jurisdictions where these are forbidden, a group marriage, or otherwise unsupportable under the prevailing family law.

== By jurisdiction ==
=== England and Wales ===
Under the law of England and Wales, a void marriage is "one that is considered never to have taken place, whatever procedure may have been followed by the people concerned." Marriage Act 1949 has been discussed in this context. The relevant legislation is sections 11 to 16 of the Matrimonial Causes Act 1973 which has been amended by the Divorce (Religious Marriages) Act 2002 and the Marriage (Same Sex Couples) Act 2013 among others.

Grounds for determining a marriage void as against public policy include consanguinity, one of the parties is under the age of sixteen, or that at the time of the marriage either party was already lawfully married. If a marriage was not legally valid, the law says that it never existed.

=== Philippines ===
In the Philippines under the Family Code, marriages terminated through a "declaration of nullity" are void ab initio or legally never existed.

This are marriages lacking any:

- Essential requisites – Legal capacity of both parties and their consent
- Formal requisites – Recognized authority of the solemnizing officer, validity of marriage license and marriage ceremony

Grounds for nullity also include either party's existing engagement in bigamous or polygamous relationships, either party's psychological incapacity, and incestuous relationships.

=== United States ===
==== New York law ====
Under the Domestic Relations Law of New York State, all incestuous marriages are void, but this does not include cousin marriages of any degree:

5. Incestuous and void marriages. A marriage is incestuous and void whether the relatives are legitimate or illegitimate between either:
  1. An ancestor and a descendant;
  2. A brother and sister of either the whole or the half blood;
  3. An uncle and niece or an aunt and nephew.
  If a marriage prohibited by the foregoing provisions of this section be solemnized it shall be void [...]
6. Void marriages. A marriage is absolutely void if contracted by a person whose husband or wife by a former marriage is living, unless either:
  1. Such former marriage has been annulled or has been dissolved for a cause other than the adultery of such person; provided, that if such former marriage has been dissolved for the cause of the adultery of such person, he or she may marry again in the cases provided for in section eight of this chapter and such subsequent marriage shall be valid;
  2. Such former marriage has been dissolved pursuant to section seven-a of this chapter.

== See also ==
- Annulment
- Bigamy
- Incest
- Marriage
- Voidable marriage
- Wedding
