= Ageing of the United Kingdom =

Population pyramid of the United Kingdom up to projections in 2100 from the UN.

The population of the United Kingdom is becoming increasingly older, due to longer life expectancy and a sub-replacement fertility rate for little under 50 years. The society is expected to change as a result culturally and economically. By 2050, 1 in every 4 people is expected to be above the age of 65 and this will be more extreme in certain areas of the country.

== Causes ==
Percentage of women childless by the age of 30 in England and Wales

Fertility rate of the United Kingdom

=== Demographic transition ===
The UK has undergone the demographic transition of its population, from a pre-industrial population pyramid (1st stage) all the way towards a post-industrial population pyramid (4th stage).

Before the 18th century, the United Kingdom retained an age structure universal to societies in the first stage of the transition theory, with high fertility rates and high mortality rates, in the late 18th century, the Industrial Revolution began, kickstarting the country's transition into the second phase: mortality rates declined but birth rates stayed at the same level; by 1870, the country had begun to transition into the third phase: the birth rate began to decline from around near 5 children per woman to below replacement level in the 1930s. The fourth phase of the transition began in the 1960s, when the fertility rate rose, and peaked during the middle of the decade, and then collapsed by 1973 to a below replacement level rate. Since then, the rate has not risen to an above replacement level fertility rate; this has resulted in a population which is currently ageing: in 2007, for the first time in the country's history, there were more people over the age of 60 then there were under the age of 16.

=== Fertility ===
The United Kingdom's fertility rate has, since 1973 (little under 50 years), been in a sub-replacement state. The fertility rate of the country has declined from a peak of a nearly 5 children per woman in late 19th century. By the 1870s, the total fertility rate of the UK population declined from 4.88 children per woman in 1871, to 2.4 by 1921. Traditional means of birth control were used such as abstinence and withdrawal facilitated the collapse of the birth rate, this was also hastened by the 1930s by more modern methods of contraception which were beginning to be used with increased acceptance. For the first time in 1973, the birth rate of the country fell below replacement level, due to liberalising acts of the National Health Service Reorganisation Act 1973, the Abortion Act 1967 and the Divorce Reform Act 1969.

== Population groups ==
=== Under 16s ===
Under 15 year old people currently comprise 19% of the population as of 2019. This group is expected to decline proportionally of the population, they comprised 20.4% in 1999, and are estimated to be 16.9% in 2039.

=== Working age population ===
The working age population (usually defined as 16 year old to 64 year old people) currently comprises 62.5% of the population as of 2019. The working age population is also expected to decline proportionally of the population. In 1999, they made up 63.8%, in 2039 they are estimated to make up 59.2%.

=== Over 65 ===
Number of people of state pension age per 1,000 of working age in the UK

Population over the age of 64 from 1966 to 2066

Number of local authorities by median age

The over 65 population currently comprises 18.5% of the population as of 2019. In 1999 they comprised one in 6 people (15.8%) and are expected to rise to nearly one every in 4 (23.9%) by 2039. The proportion of over 85s is likely to grow as well, in England alone, the total amount of those over the age of 85 will double from 1.3 million to 2.6 million by 2046.

Population groups mapped by percentage of total population in local authorities as of the 2021 census

Under 16 year olds

Working age population (16 to 64 years old)

Above 65 years old

== Implications ==
=== Social ===
Culturally the society is expected to change as a larger proportion of the population comprises the over 65 population and fewer people comprise the under 15 year old population. Social attitudes around old age are expected to change.

Increasingly, more people will begin to live past the age of 100 in future decades. In 2020, there were a total of 15,120 centenarians in the UK.

=== Economic ===
Economically, a larger proportion of public spending will need to be devoted to elderly care as the population gets older. Similarly, those over the age of 65 may need to stay in employment, this has been a growing trend since 1998 when around 5% of over 65 year olds were employed to 2018 where just over 10% are still employed. This is a particular problem as currently 30% of the UK's workforce is over the age of 50 in 2015 and due to the lack of young people, there will unlikely be enough people to replace those who leave the workforce due to old age.

NHS general spending is an example of this, with the total cost of a citizen rising as they get older. Due to multimorbidity which rises with age, the cost of health spending goes up.

Pensions are an additional problem, and are expected to continue to rise as the population gets older. £96.7 billion was paid out in pensions in 2018 alone, with an increase of £1.2 billion from the previous year. Proposed plans to alleviate the problem have been rising the pension age more.

=== Geographically ===
Population ageing is more prevalent in those living in rural defined areas than BUAs (built up areas). The cities identified as the youngest were primarily those with a higher proportion of migrant populations. These were: Slough, Oxford, Luton, London, Cambridge, Leicester, Milton Keynes, Coventry, Cardiff, Bradford and Blackburn. In conjunction, cities identified as the oldest in the UK primarily were on the coast, those were: Blackpool, Worthing, Bournemouth, Southend, Swansea, Mansfield, Barnsley, Wakefield, Birkenhead and Sunderland. However the BBC notes that in general, the average age in most cities have grown older.

== Health ==
Even though the life expectancy is increasing in the UK, the healthy life expectancy at birth (years lived in good health) and the disability-free life expectancy in people over 65 have not changed significantly. This means that the increasingly ageing population of the UK has an increasing need for healthcare and support.

=== Multimorbidity ===
Older people are more likely to have multiple long-term health conditions (multimorbidity). As of 2024, one in four adults in England have two or more long-term health conditions. It is estimated that by 2035 67.8% of people over 65 will have multimorbidity.

=== Frailty ===
Frailty refers to a state of health in which older adults gradually lose their bodies' in-built reserves and functioning, making them more vulnerable and less likely to recover. Between 2006 and 2017, the average age of frailty onset was around 69 in the UK and moderate or severe frailty affected more than half of British people aged over 85. 19% of people between 50 and 64 years had already had mild to moderate frailty. In England, the prevalence of frailty varies geographically with some areas having 4 times more people with frailty than others. People living in areas with the most deprivation are twice more likely to have frailty. Compared to those who do not have frailty, people with frailty in England are 6 times more likely to be admitted to hospital.

=== Climate change ===
Due to climate change, the UK has experienced a significant increase in severe heat waves. Increasingly intense and prolonged heat periods can have dire health consequences and the elderly are at an increased risk of dying from heat exposure. The UK's ageing population and the increasing prevalence of chronic diseases, particularly multimorbidity, will exacerbate the impact of climate change, making people more vulnerable to extreme temperatures.

== Government response ==
The British government has historically been very lax about the issue, in 1984 at the UN Conference on Population in Mexico, the government at the time stated:

The United Kingdom('s) government does not pursue a population policy in the sense of actively trying to influence the overall size of the population, its age-structure, or the components of change except in the field of immigration. Nor has it expressed a view about the size of population, or the age-structure, that would be desirable. ...The current level of births has not been the cause of general anxiety. The prevailing view is that decisions about fertility and childbearing are for people themselves to make, but that it is proper for government to provide individuals with the information and the means necessary to make their decisions effective. To this end, the government provides assistance with family planning as part of the National Health Service. The ‘ageing’ of the population does raise social and economic issues. However, it is believed that these will prove manageable; and also, to a degree, that society will adapt....’

== Population pyramids ==
Population pyramids of the UK

UK population pyramid from 1950 to 2022

England

Northern Ireland

Scotland

Wales
Population pyramid, in individual frames

1851

1861

1881

1891

1911

1921

1931

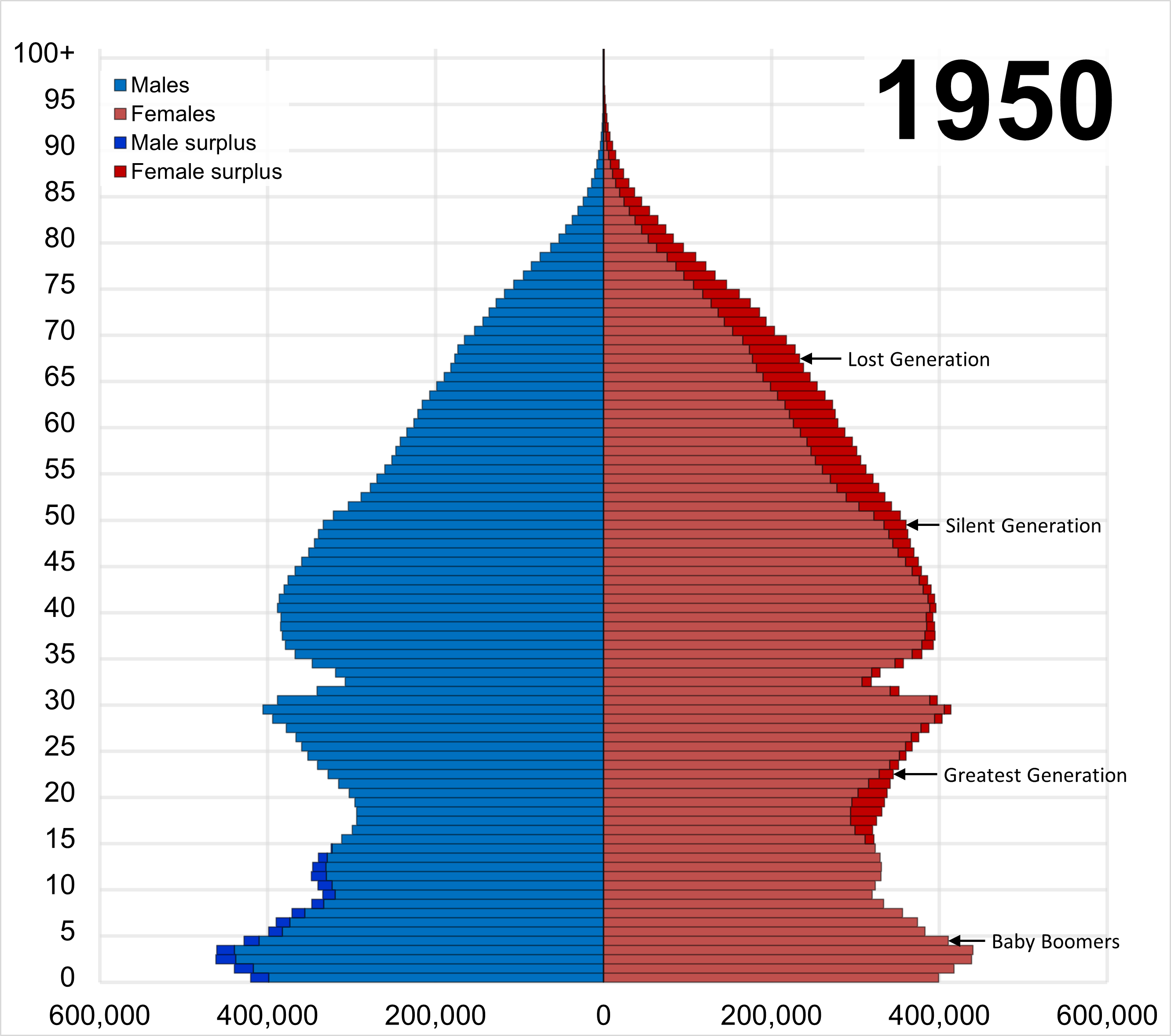
1950

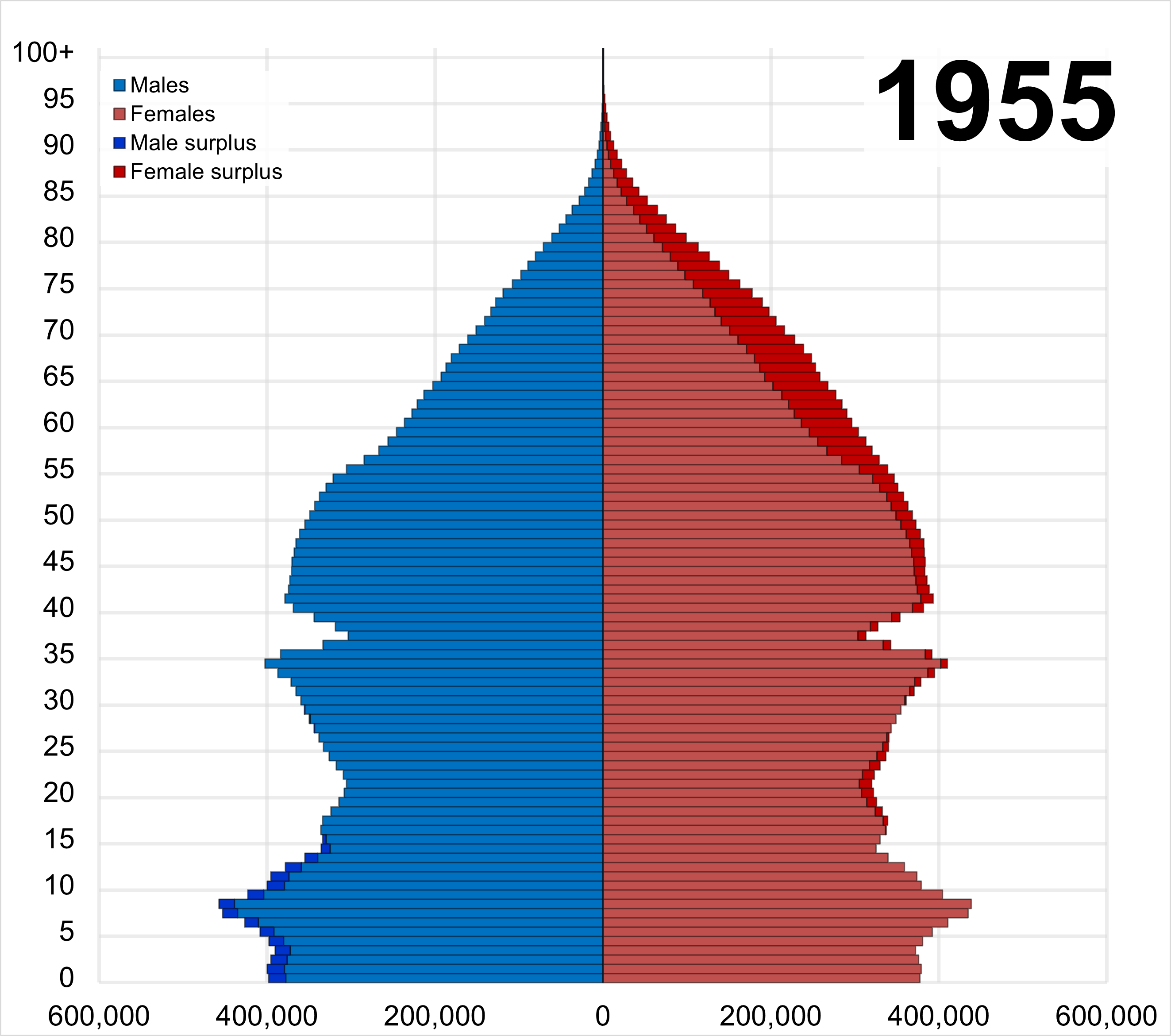
1955

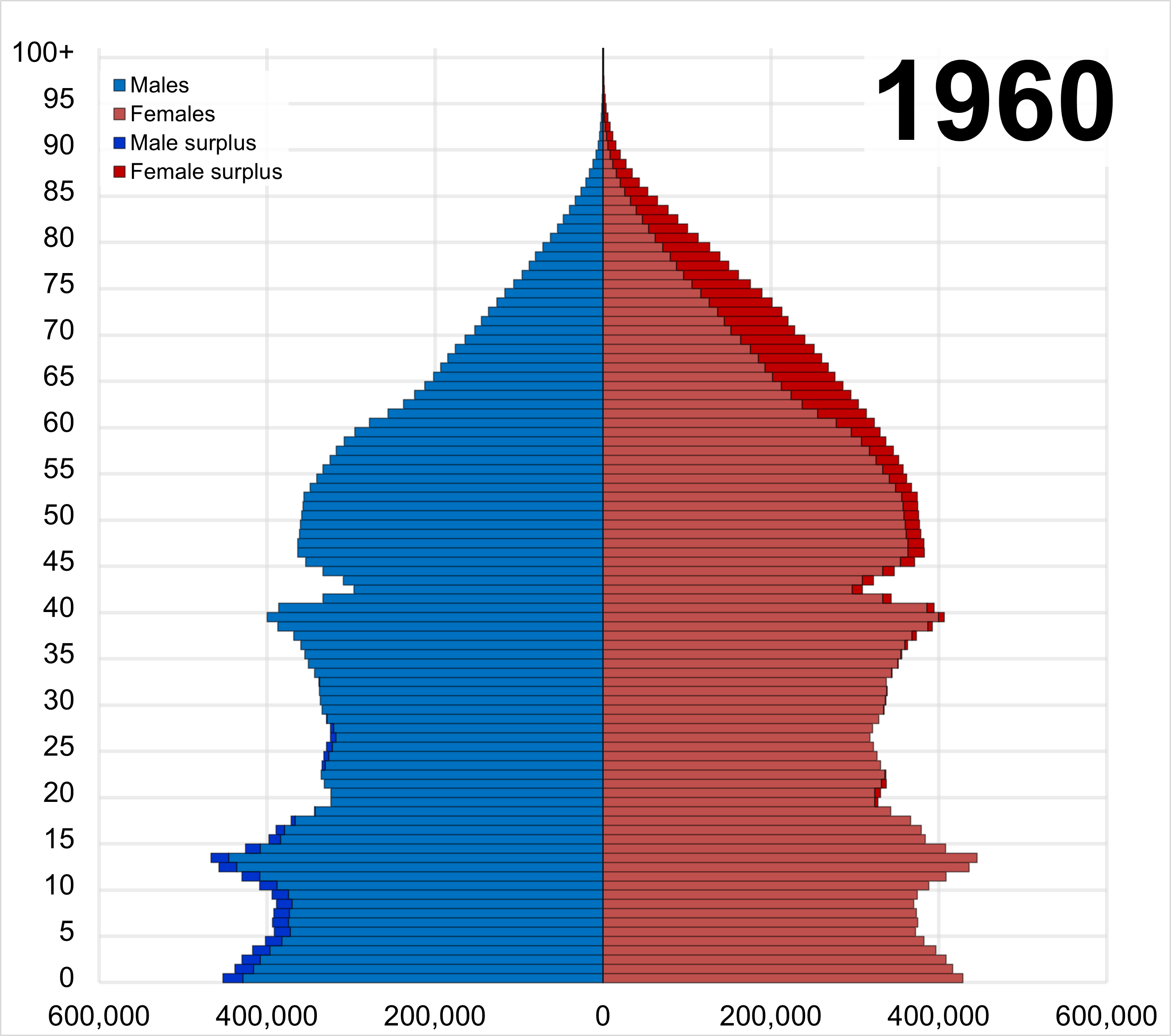
1960

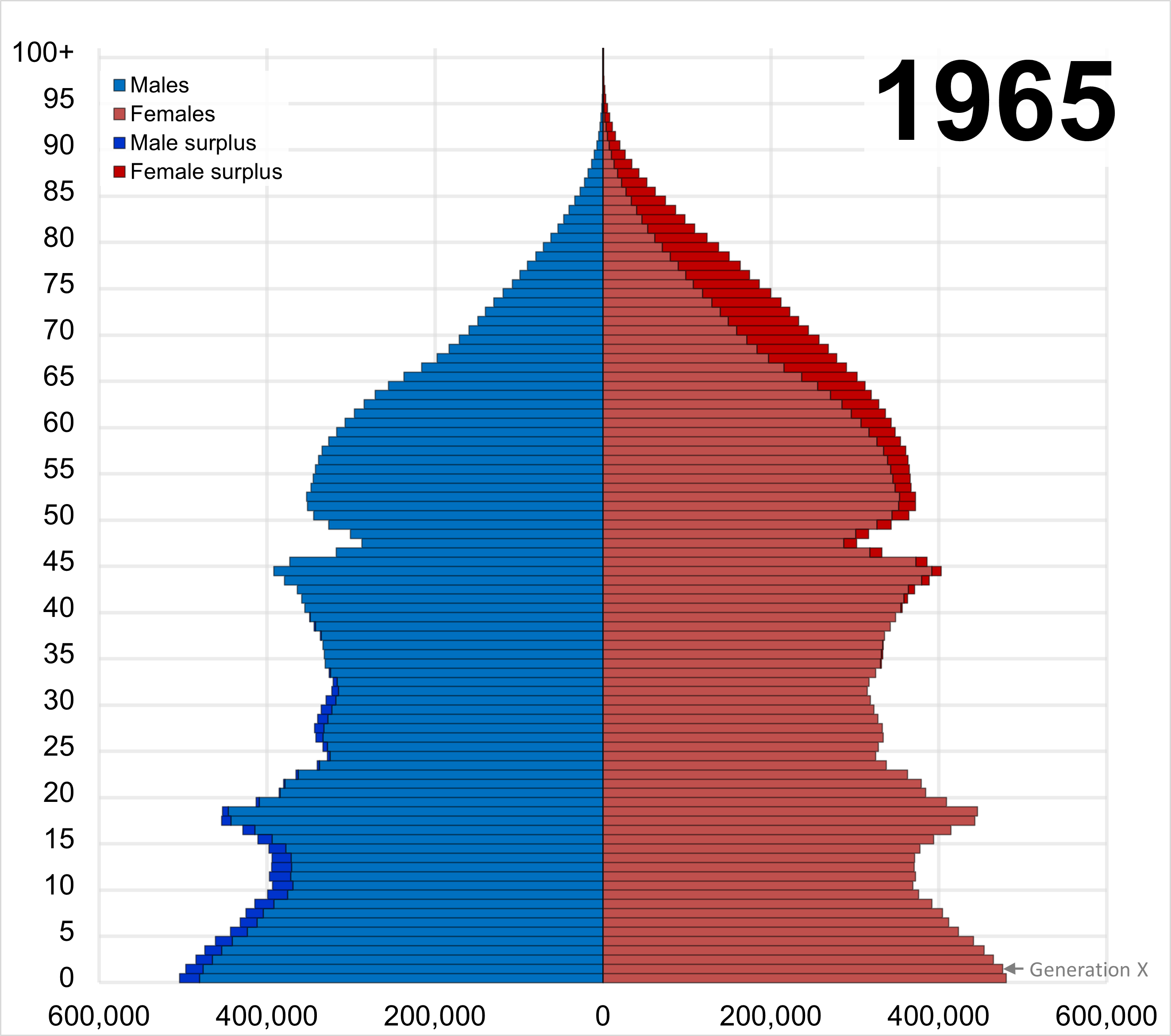
1965

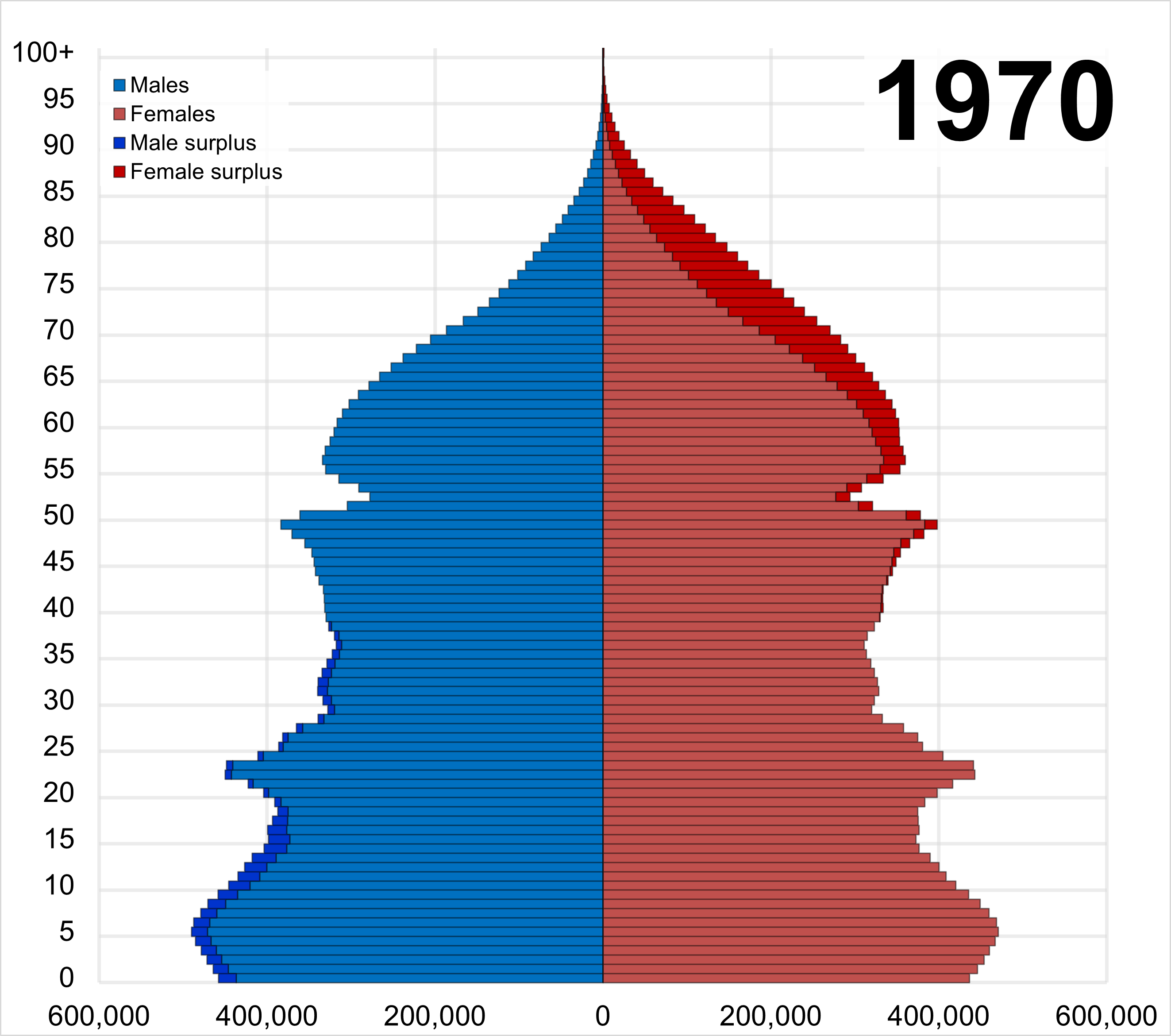
1970

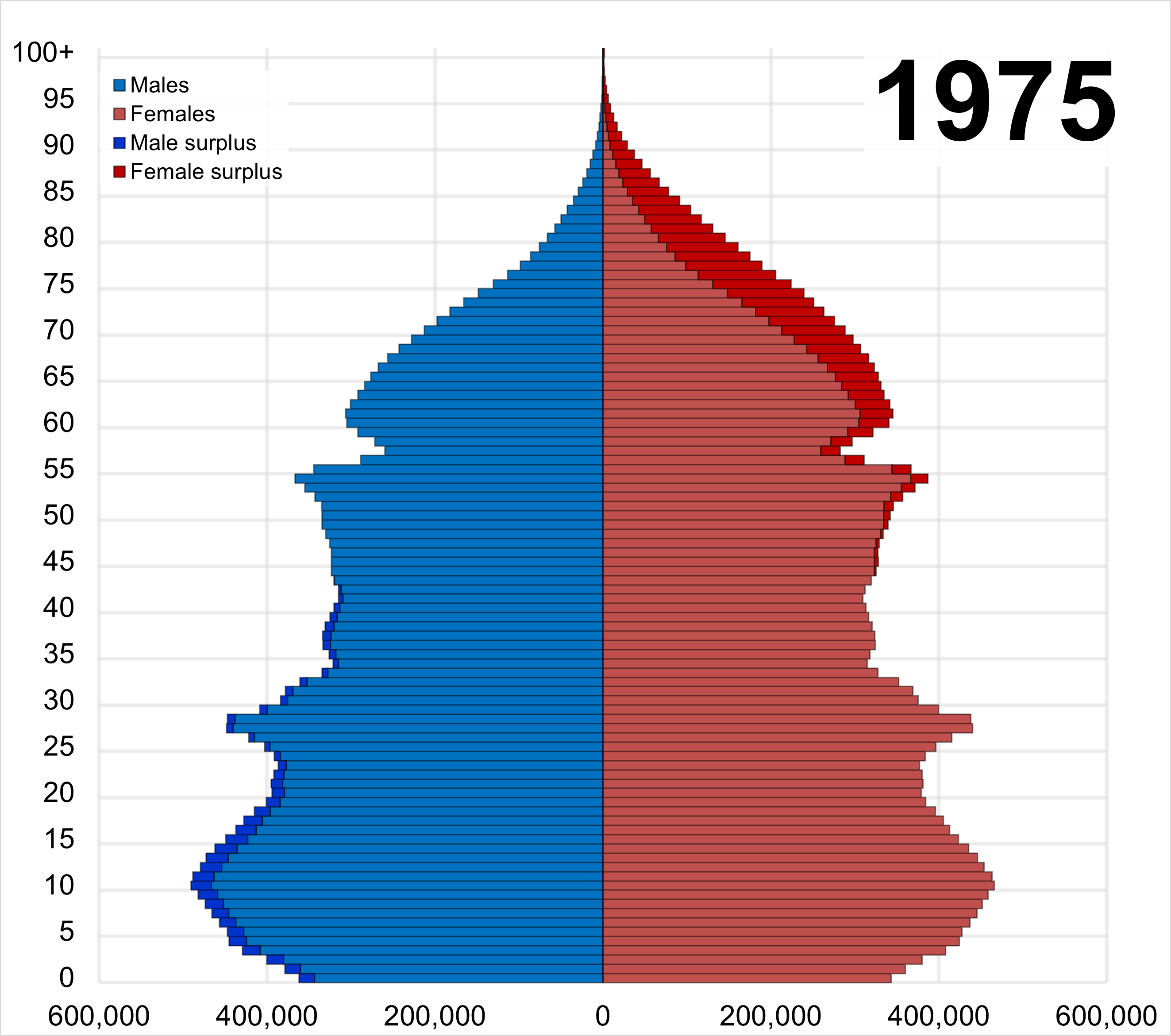
1975

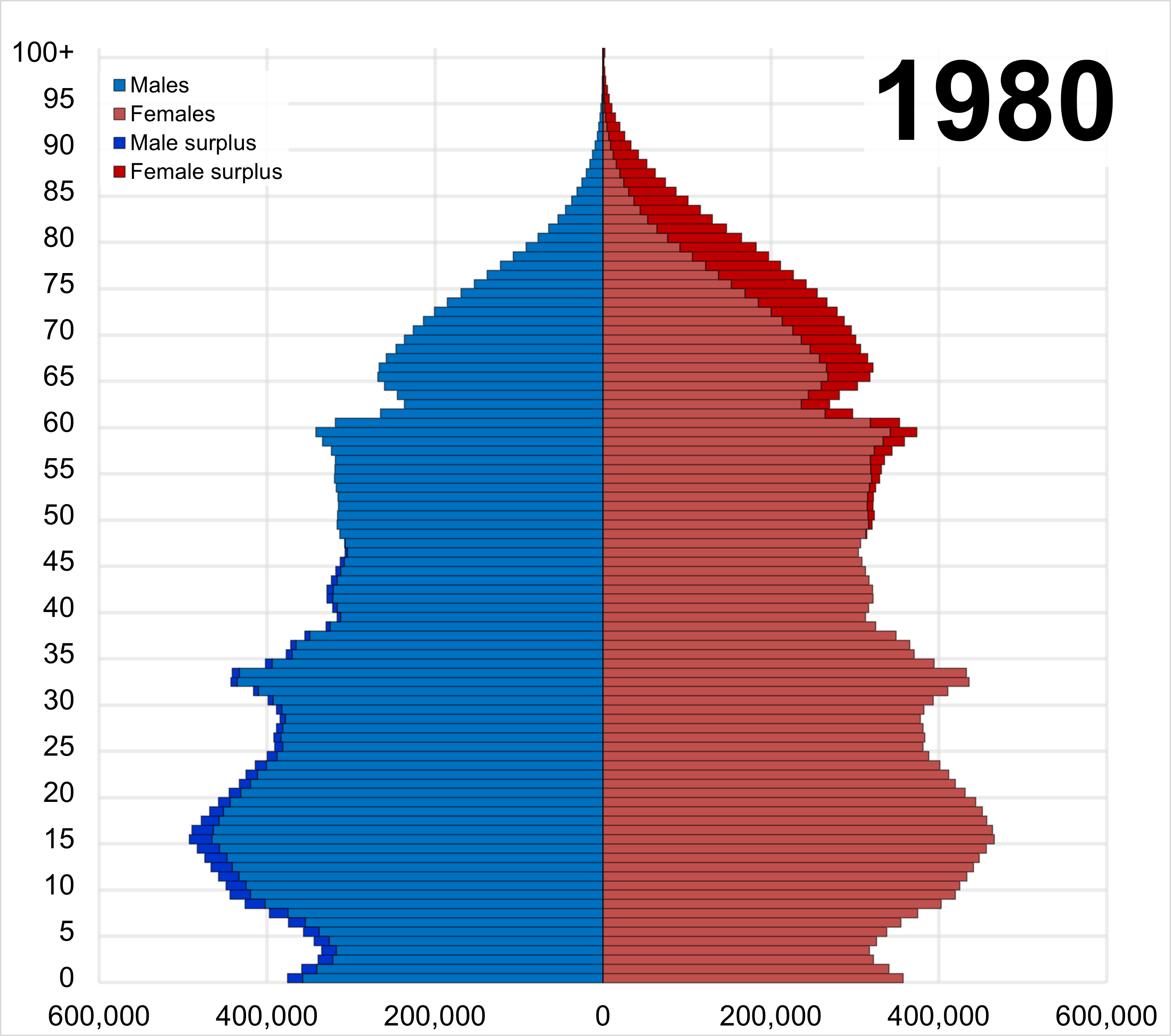
1980

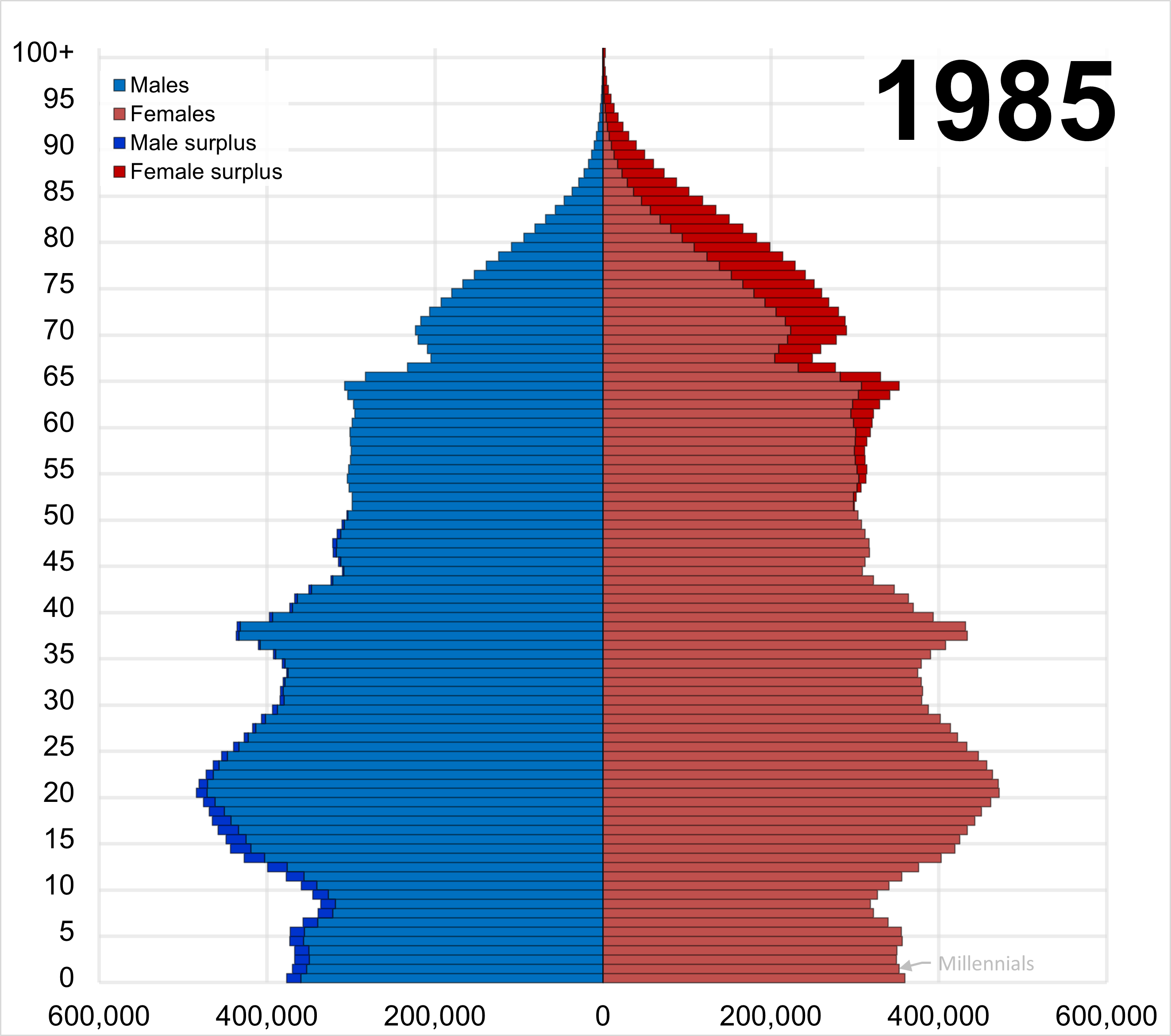
1985

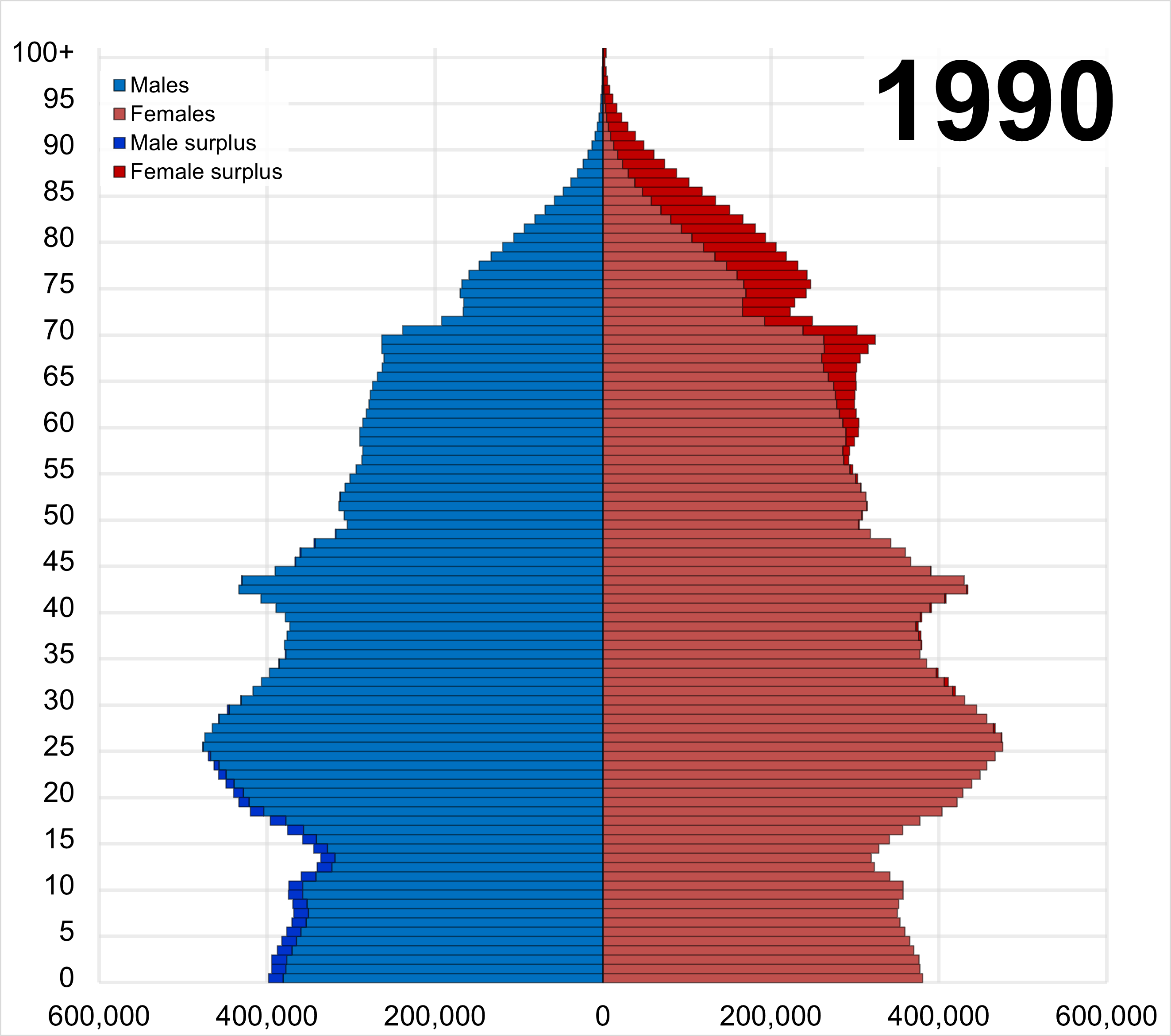
1990

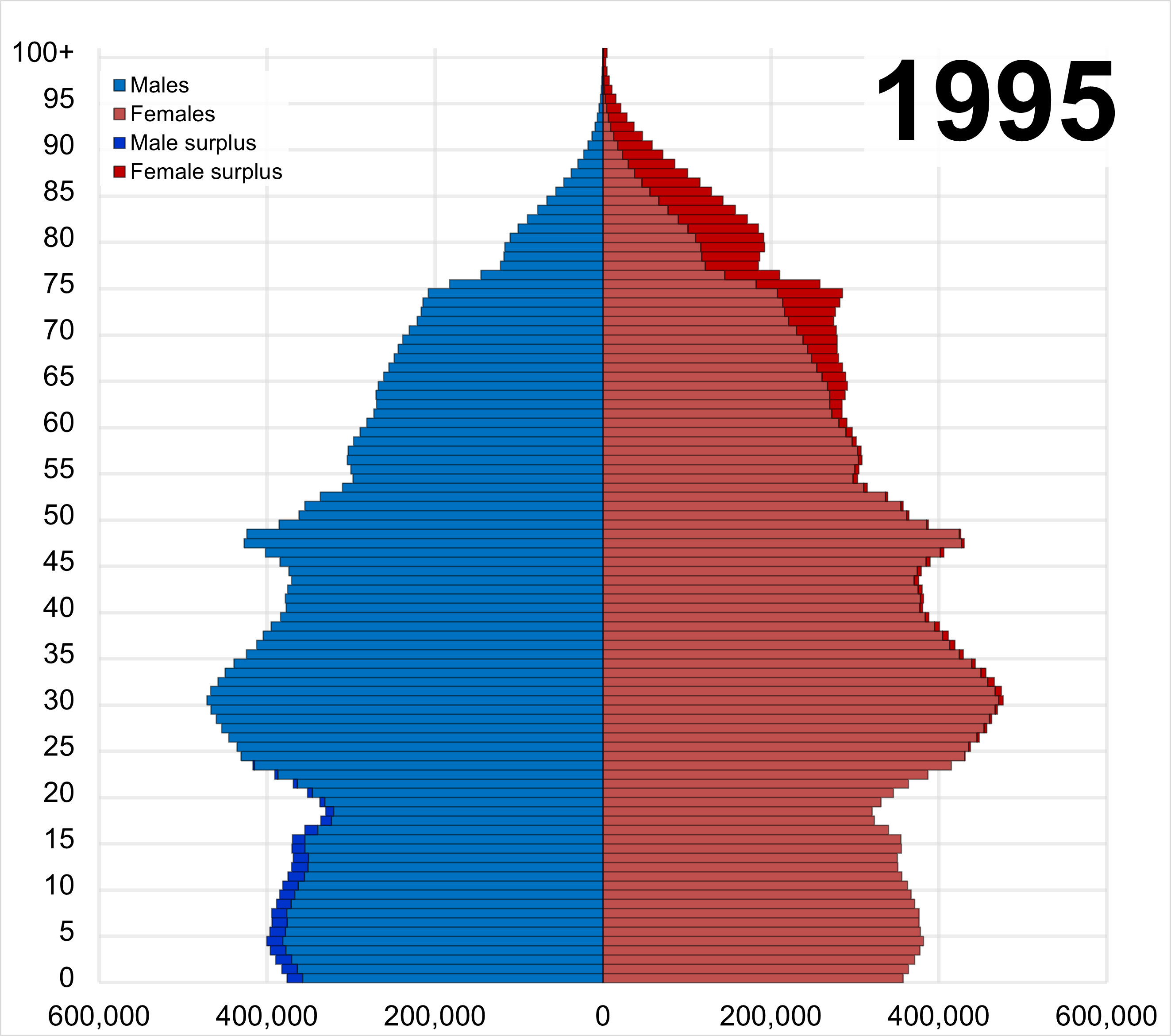
1995

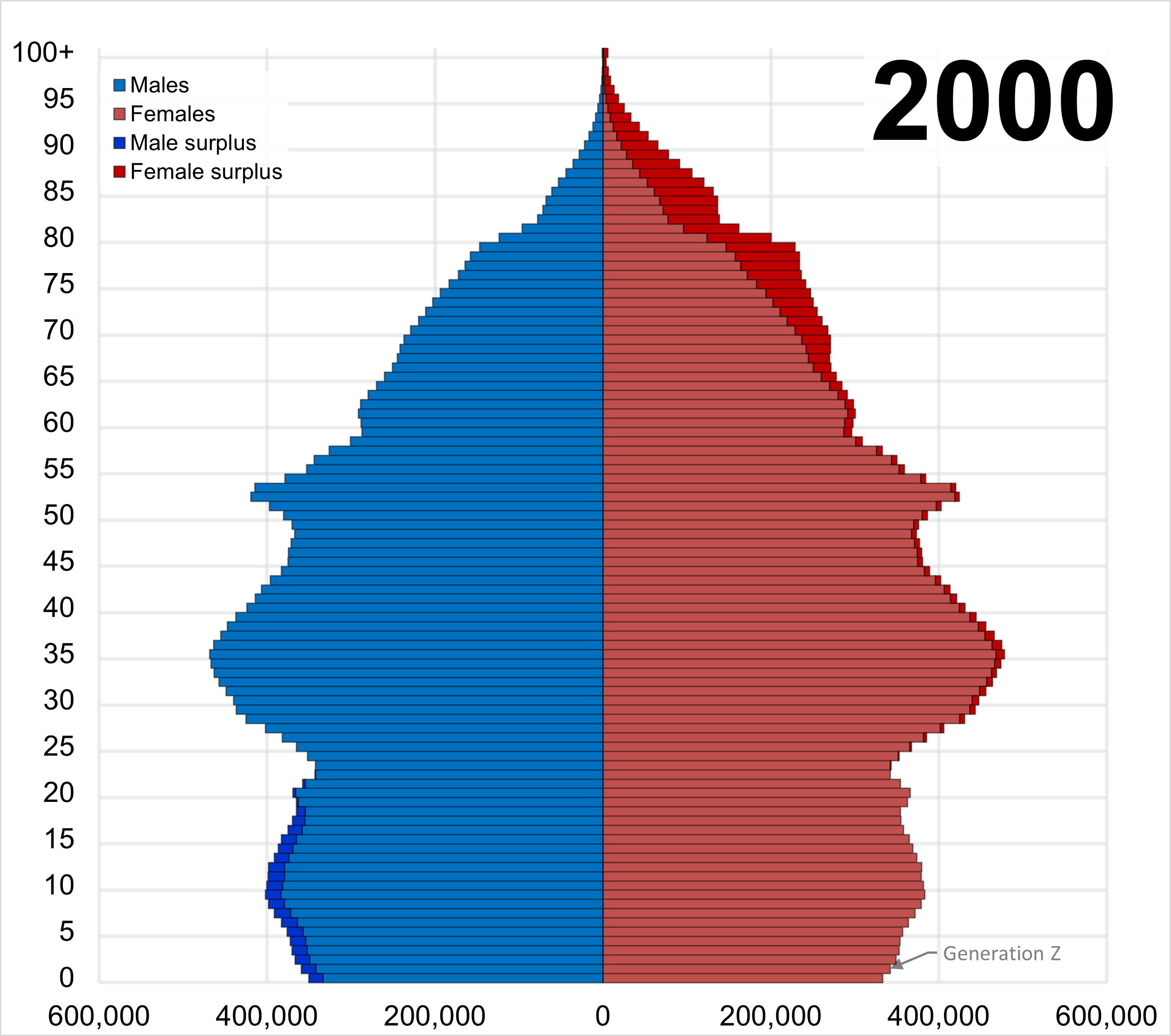
2000

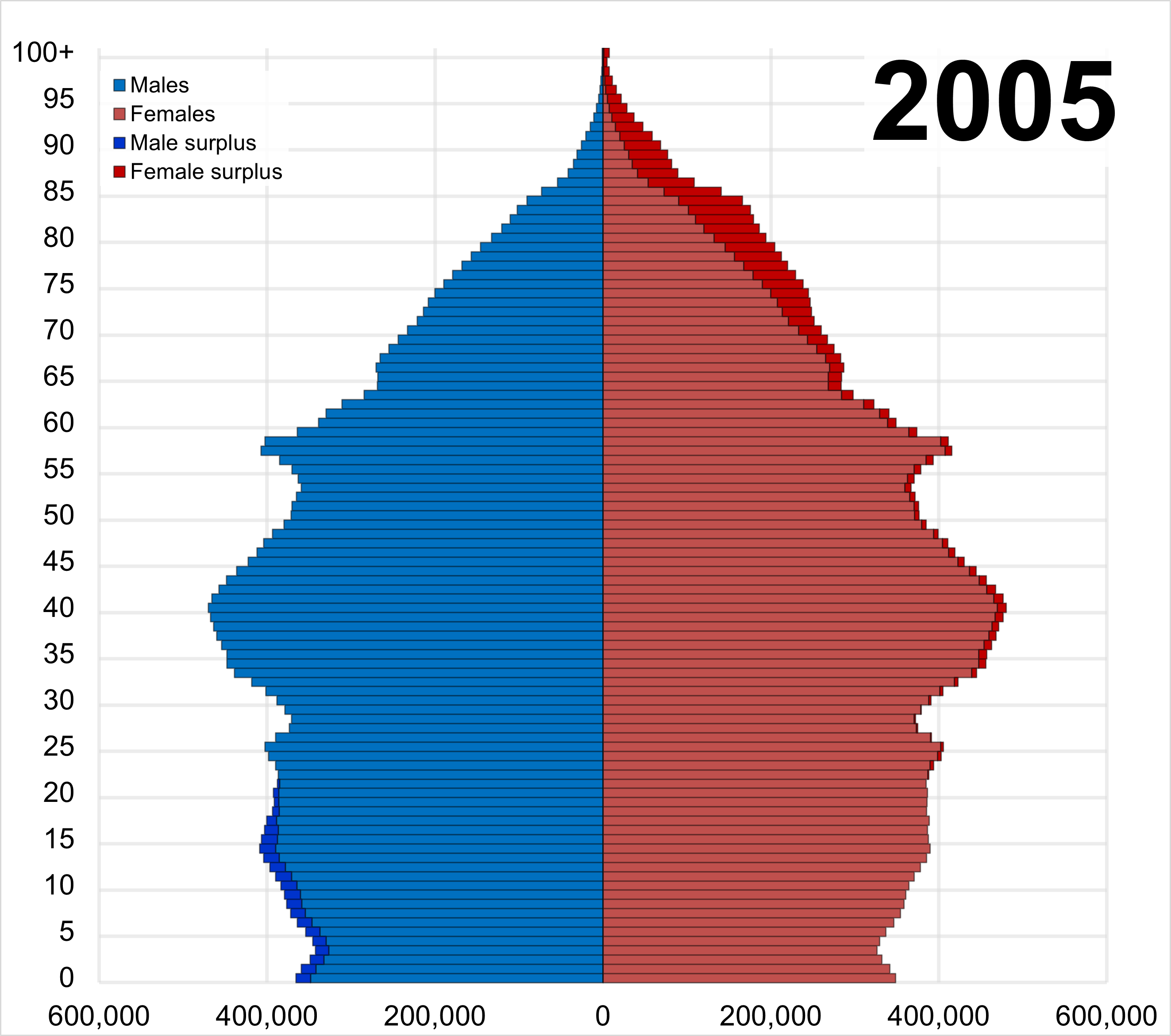
2005

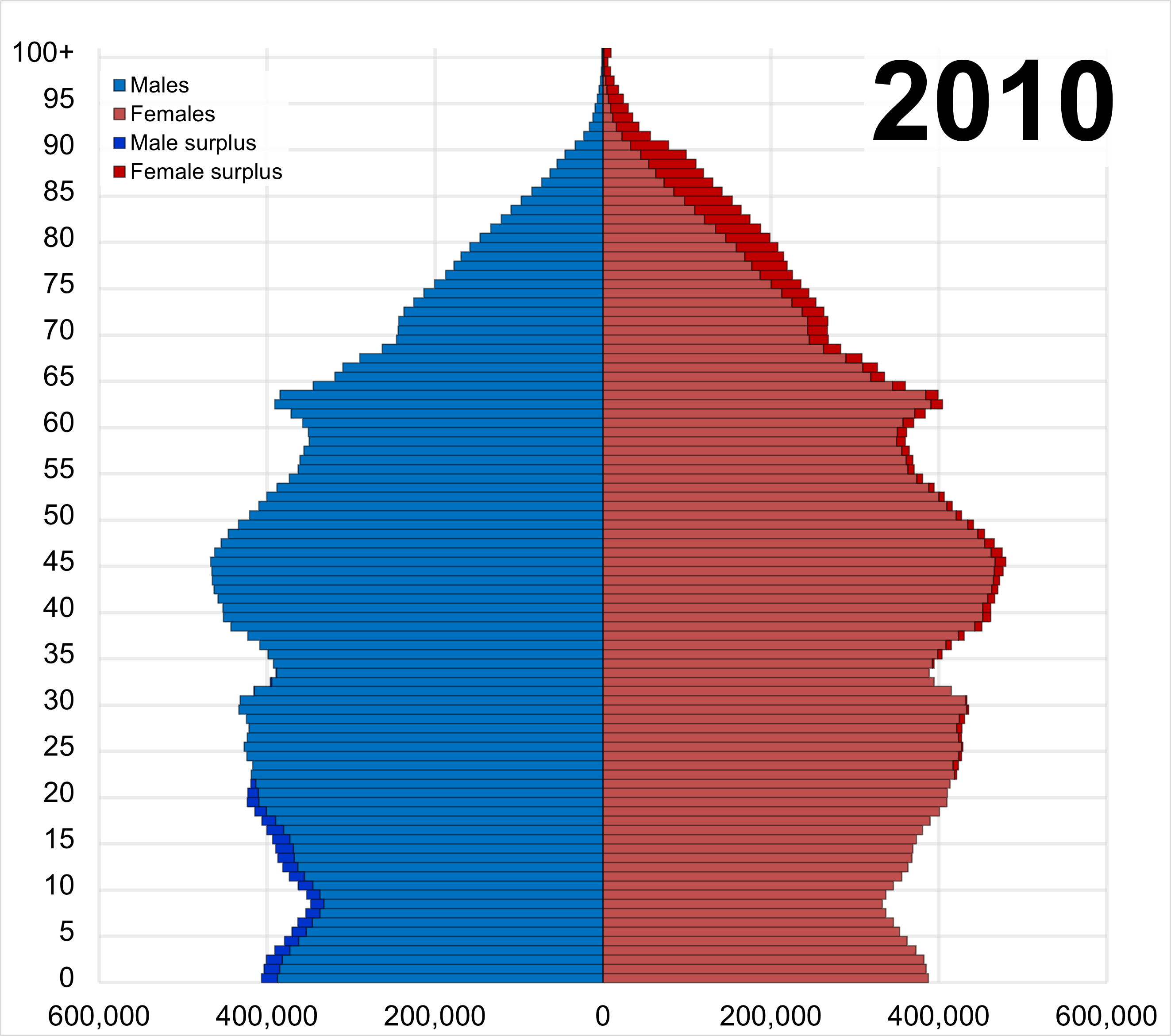
2010

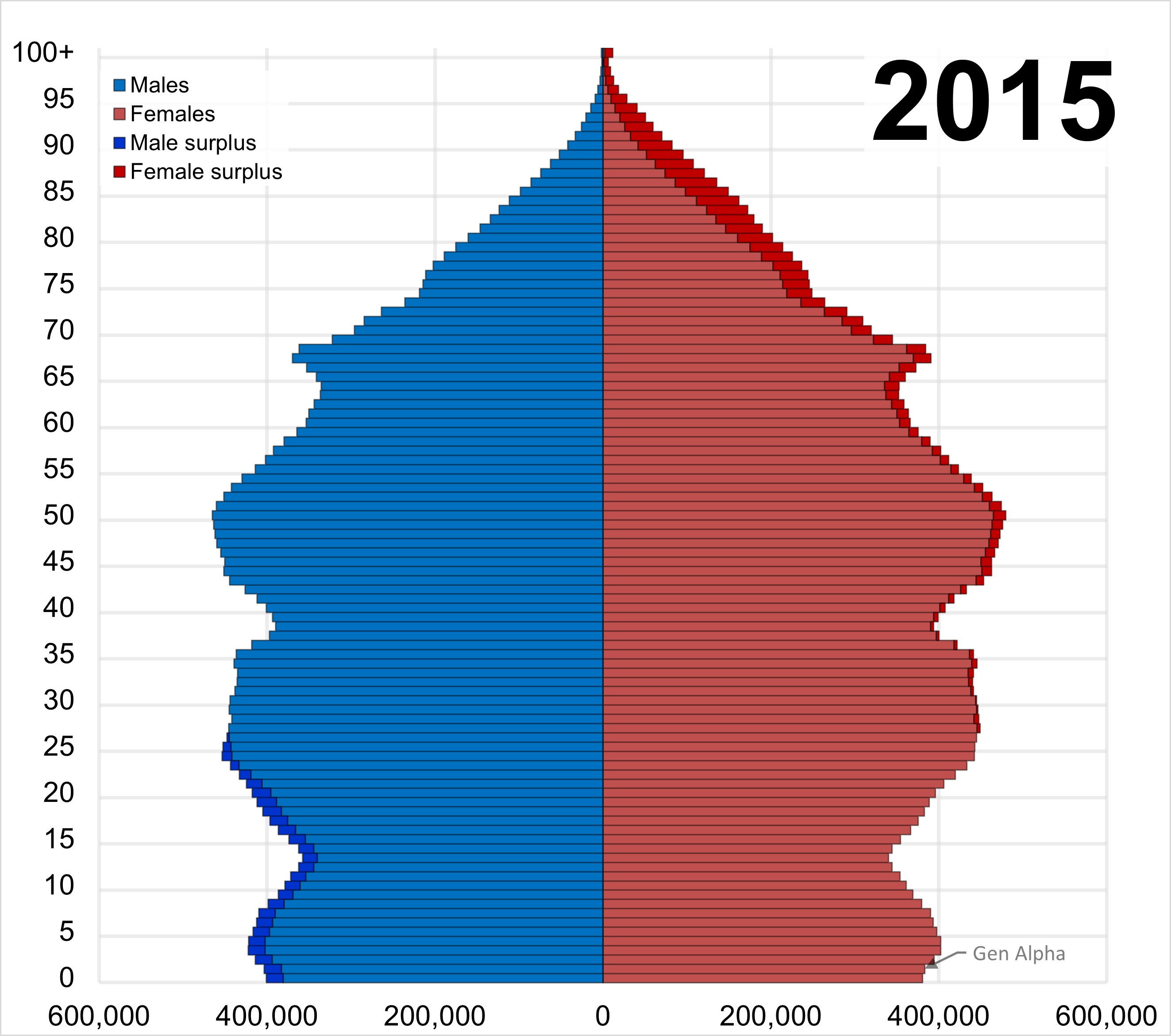
2015

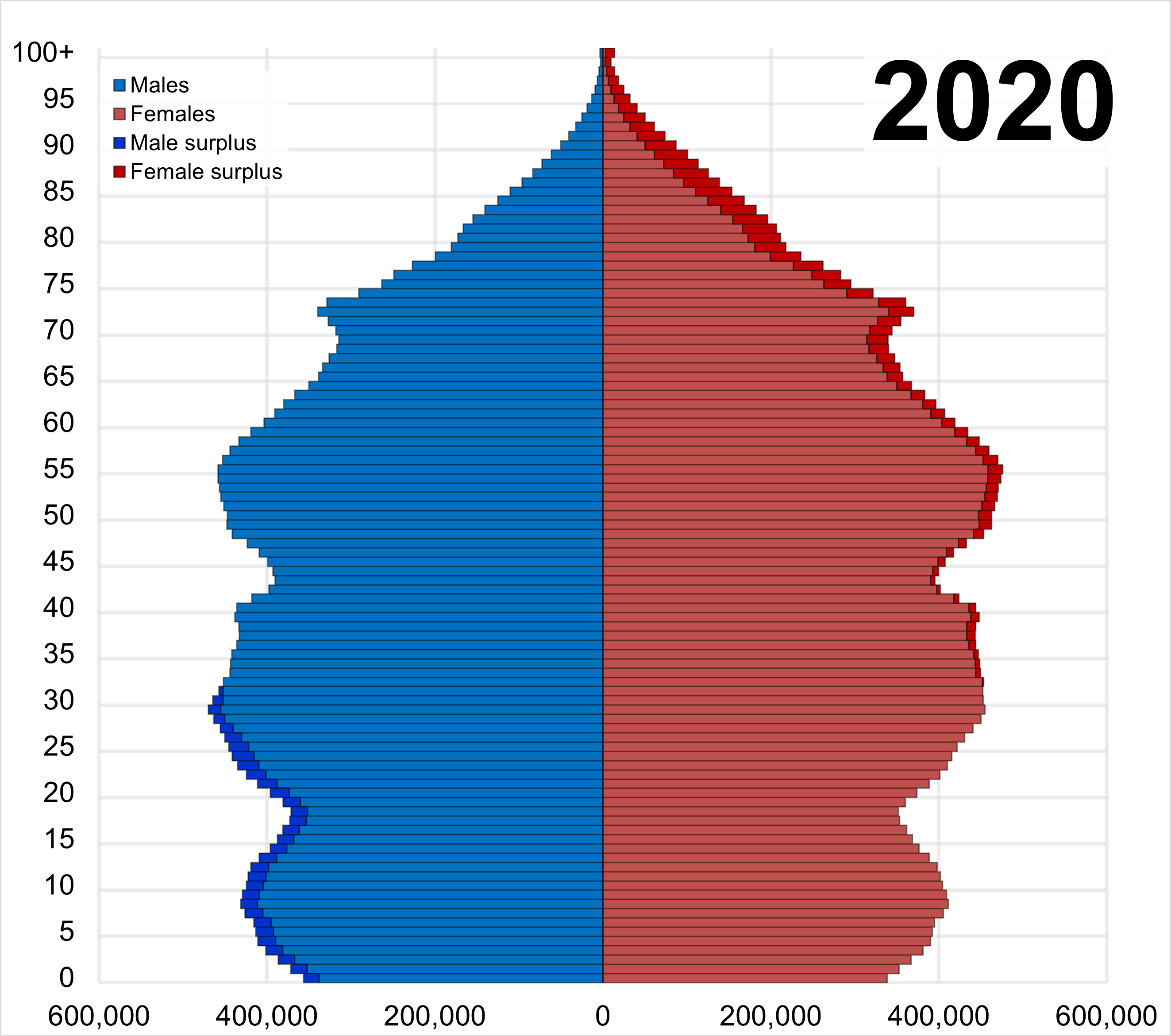
2020

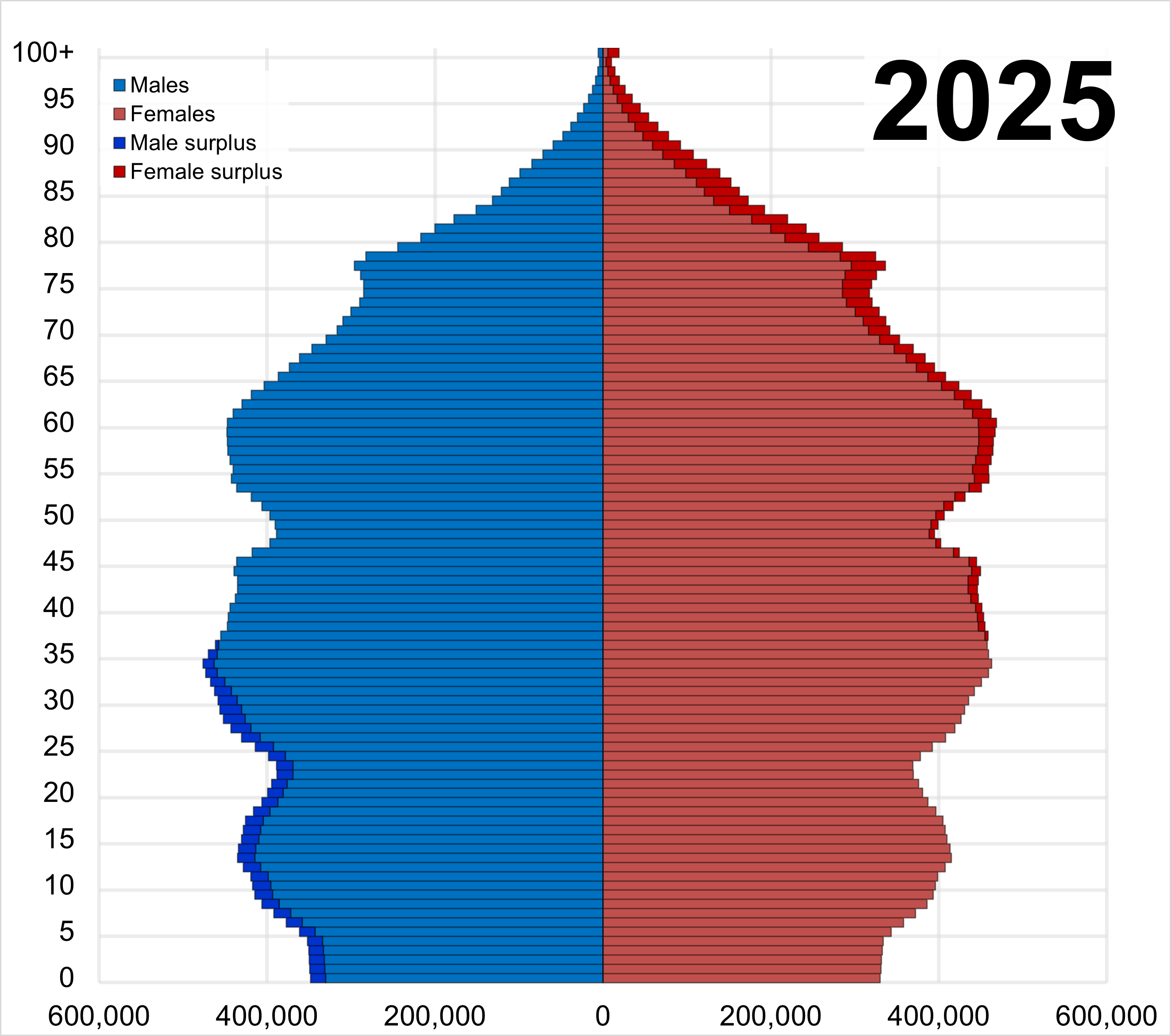
2025

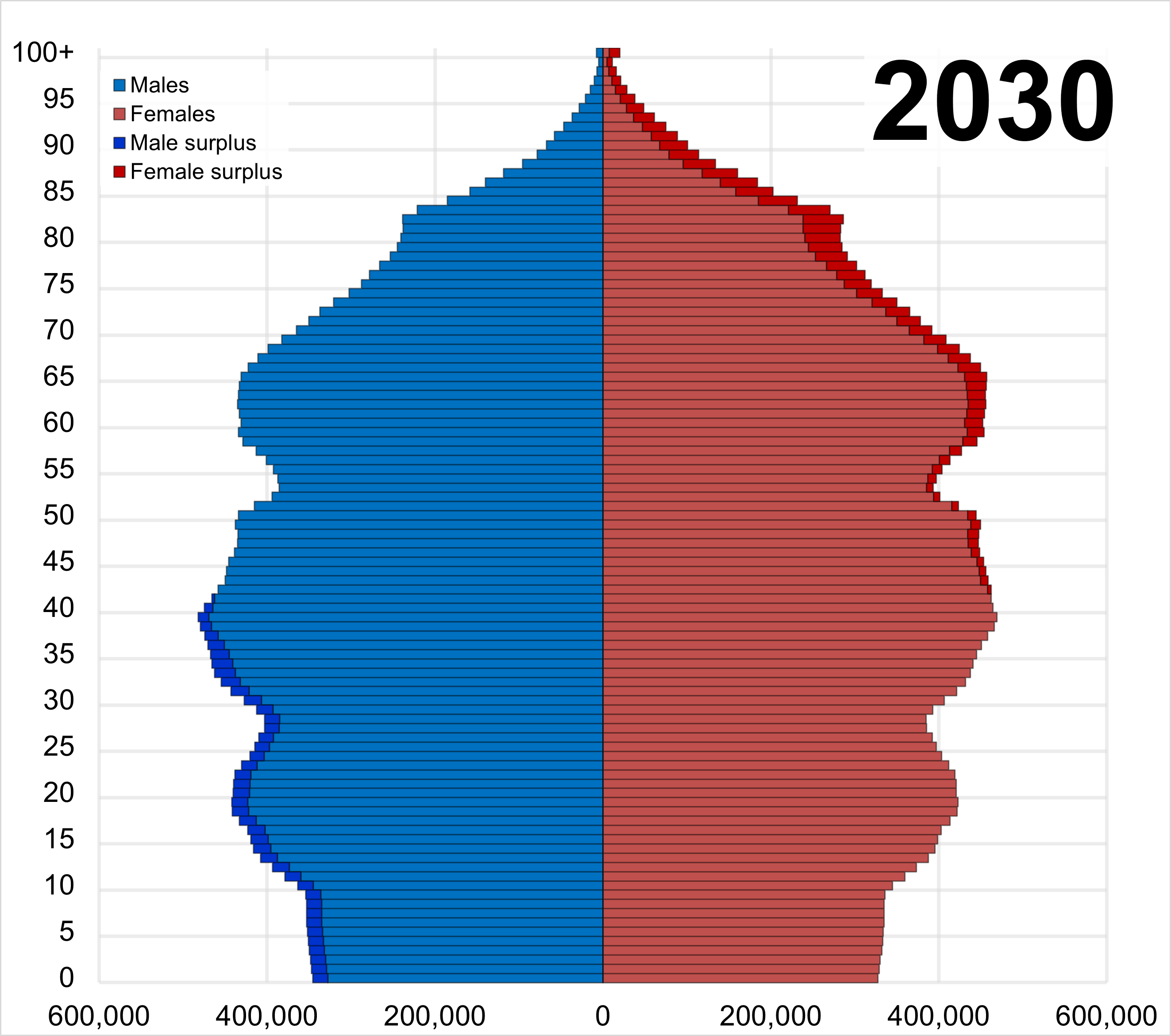
2030

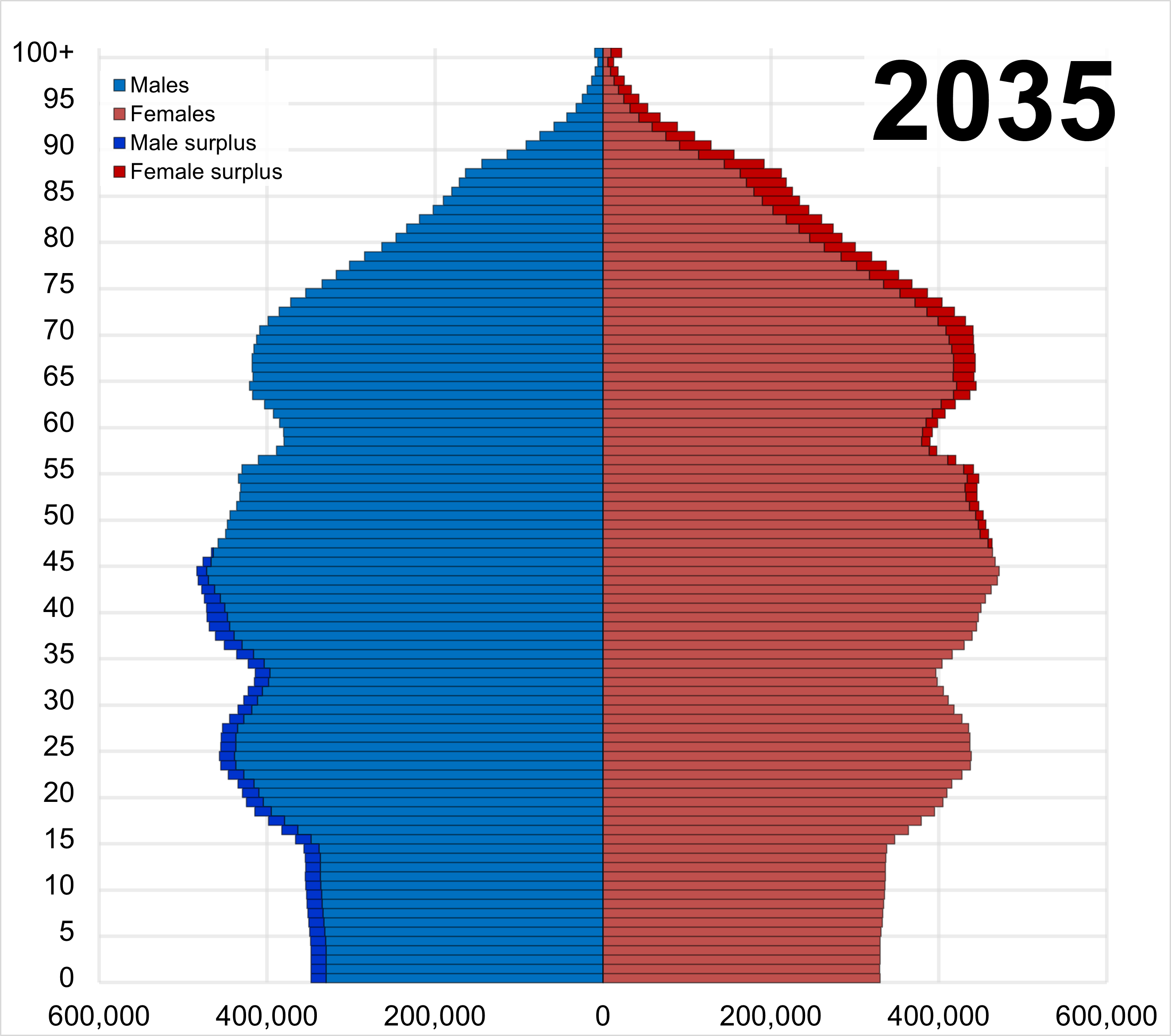
2035

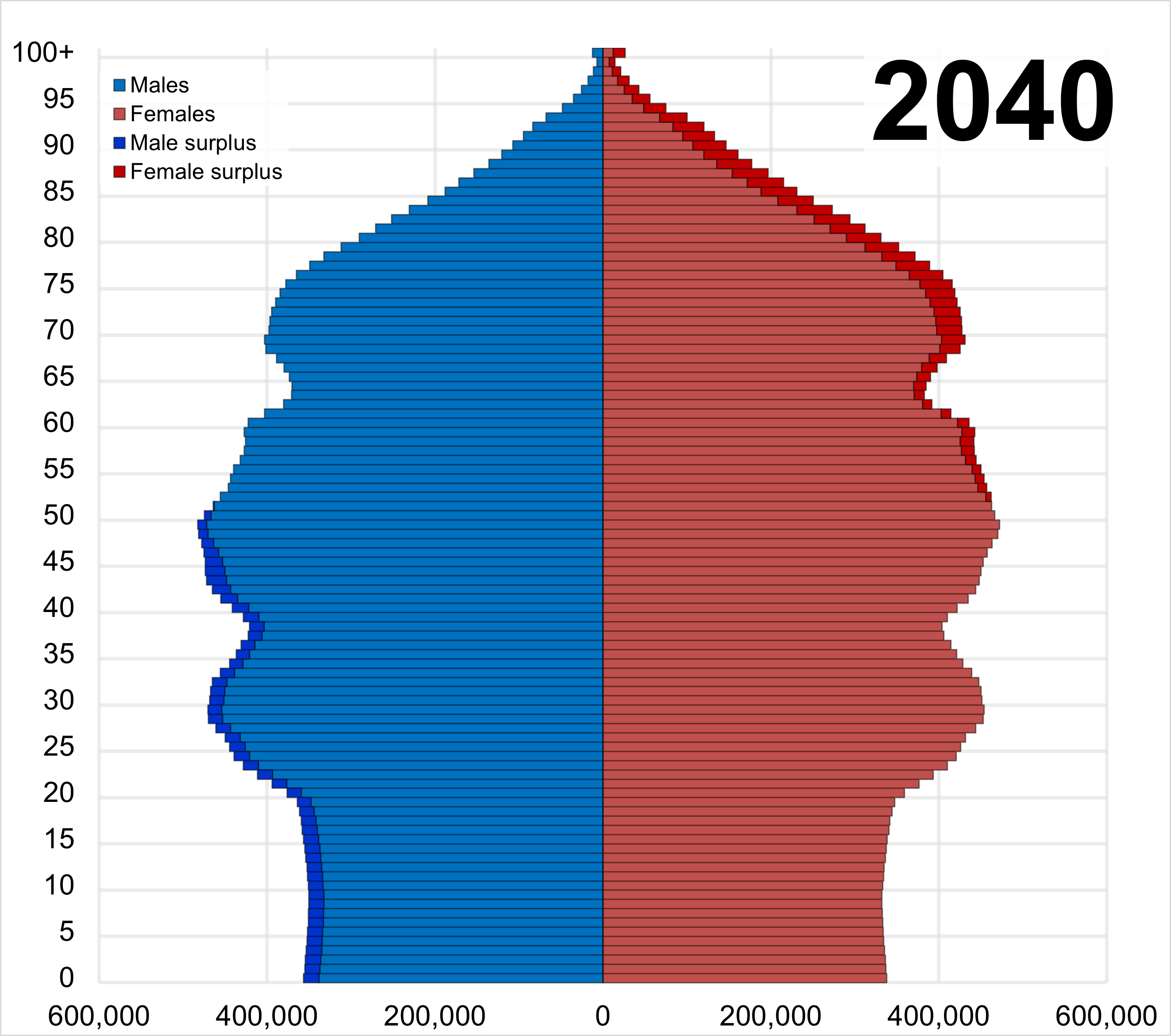
2040

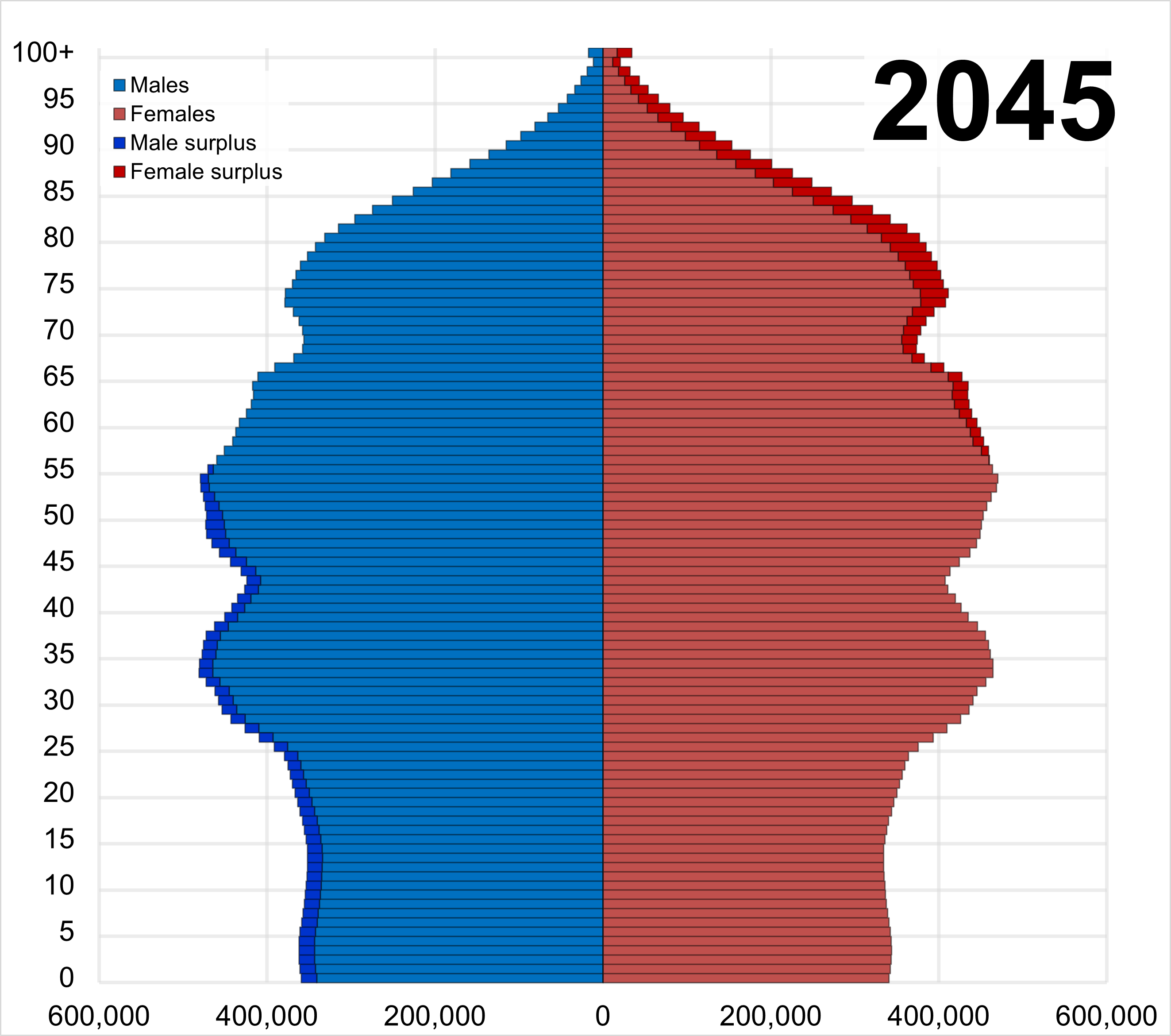
2045

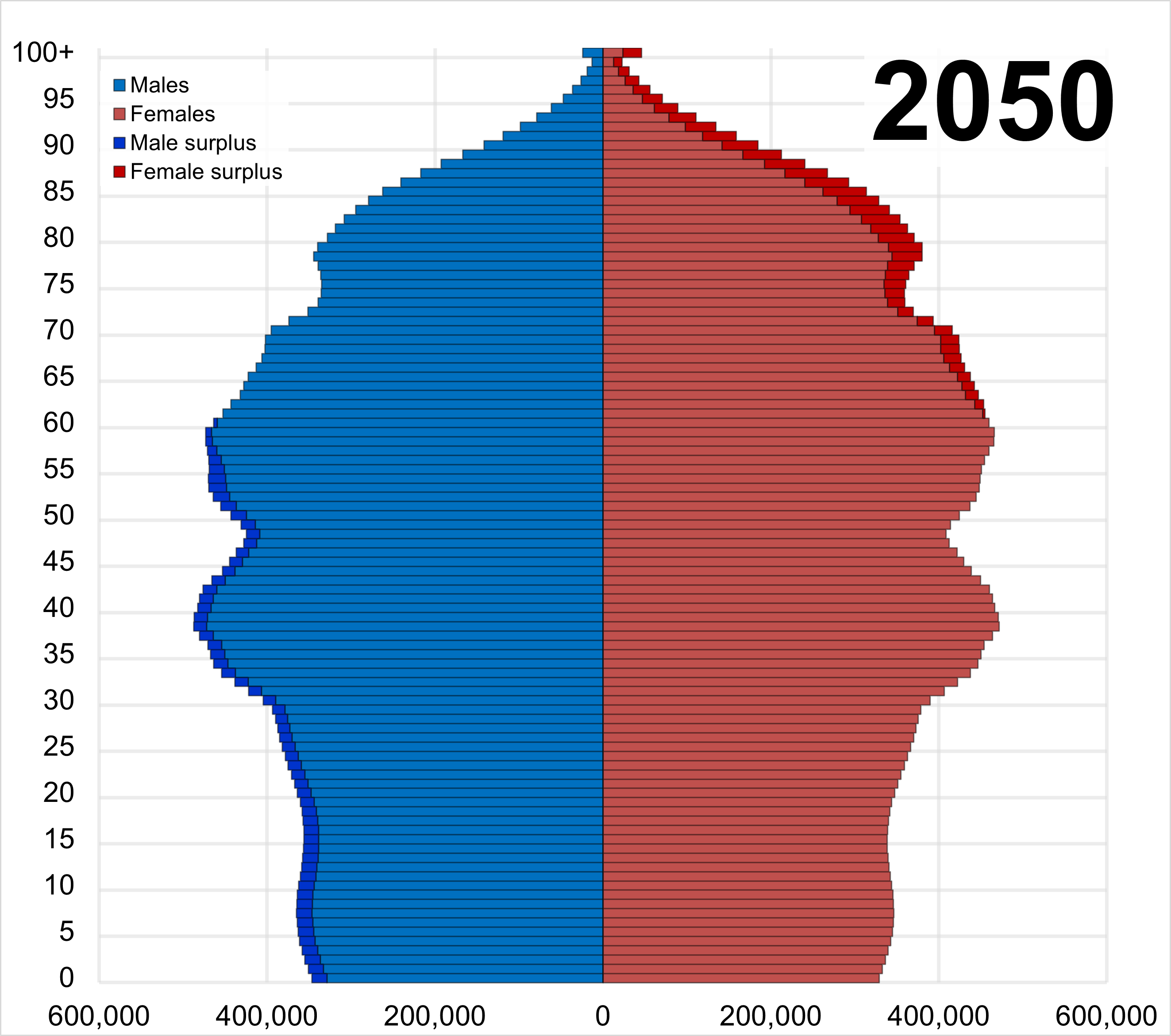
2050

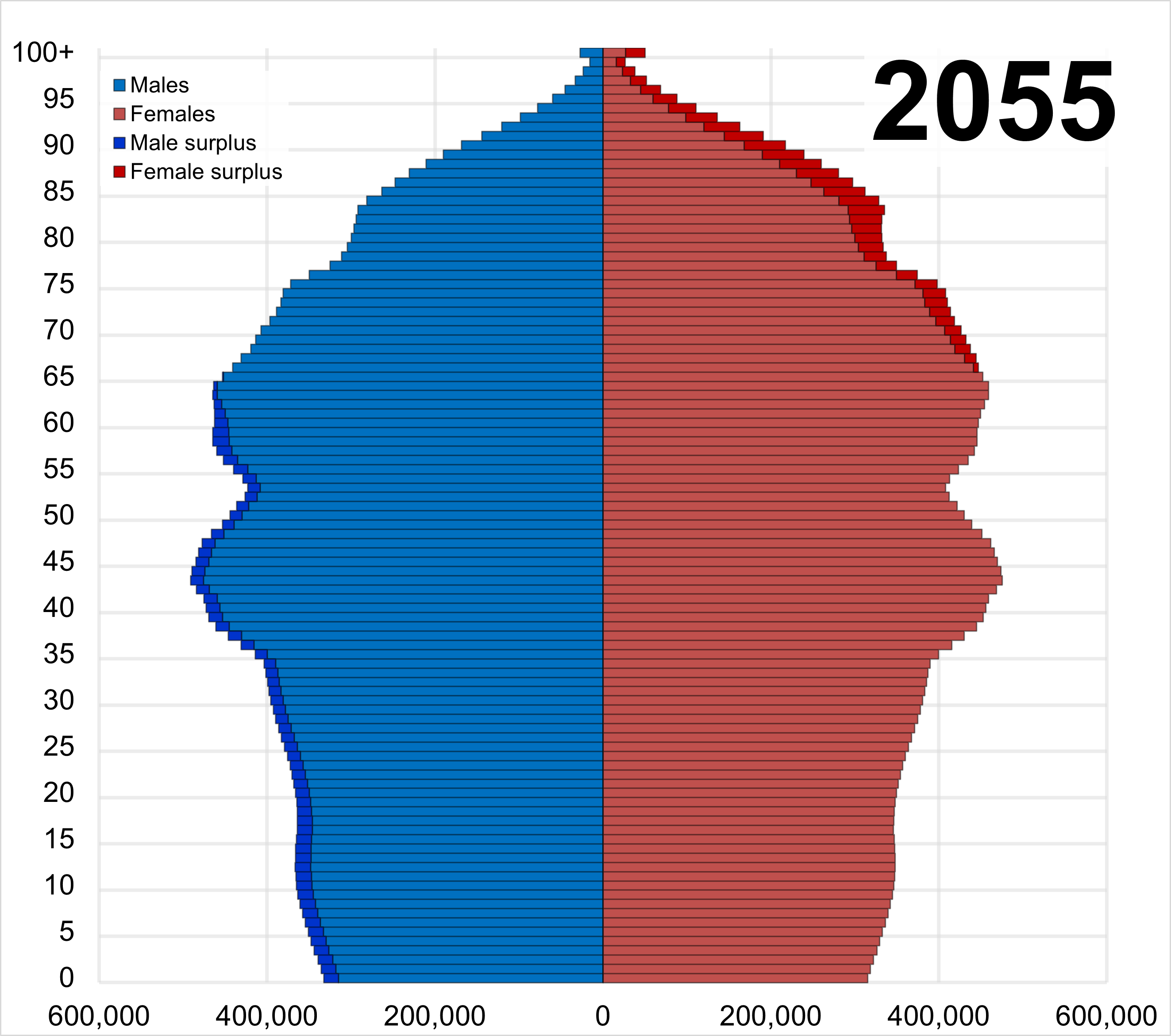
2055

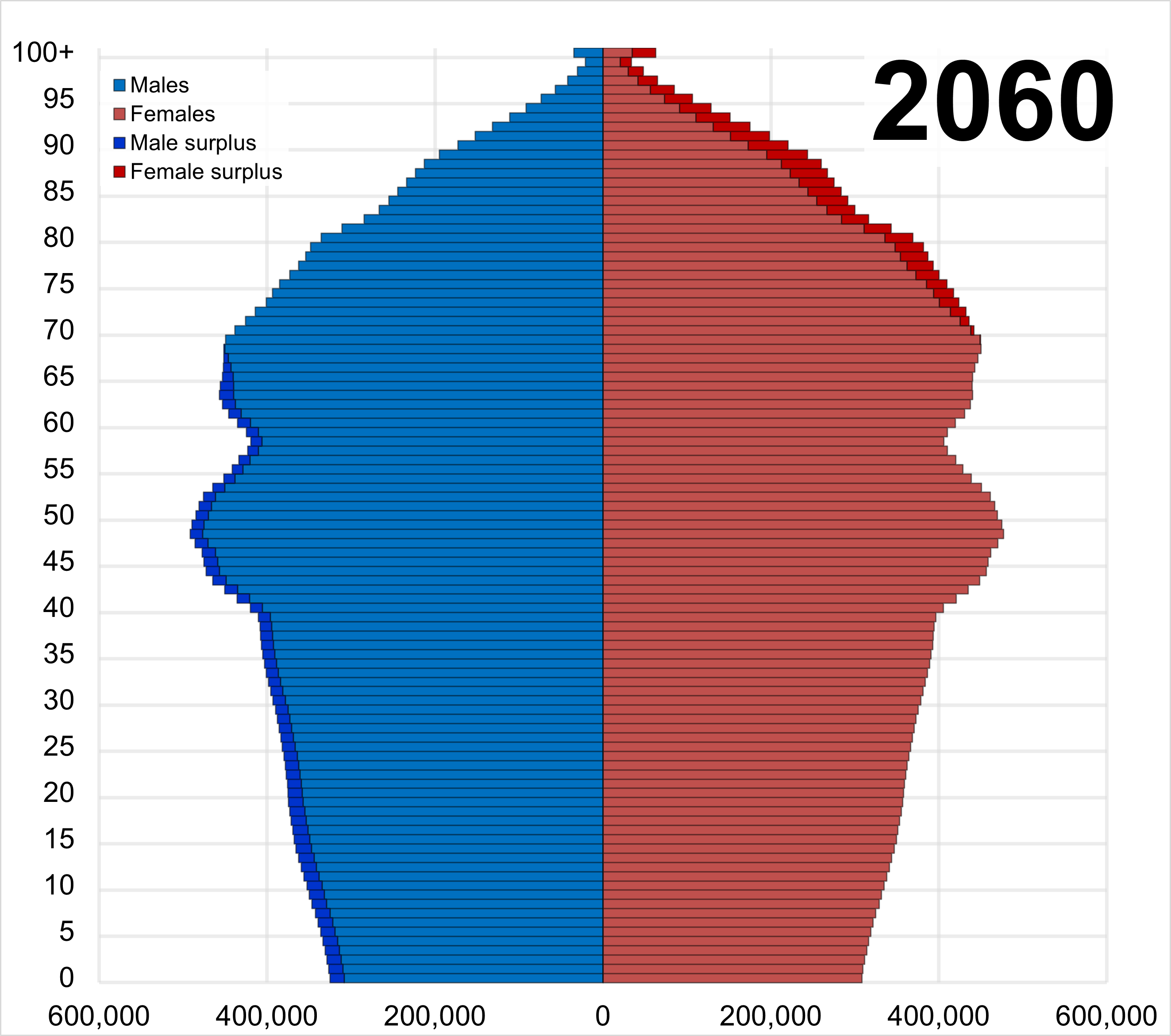
2060

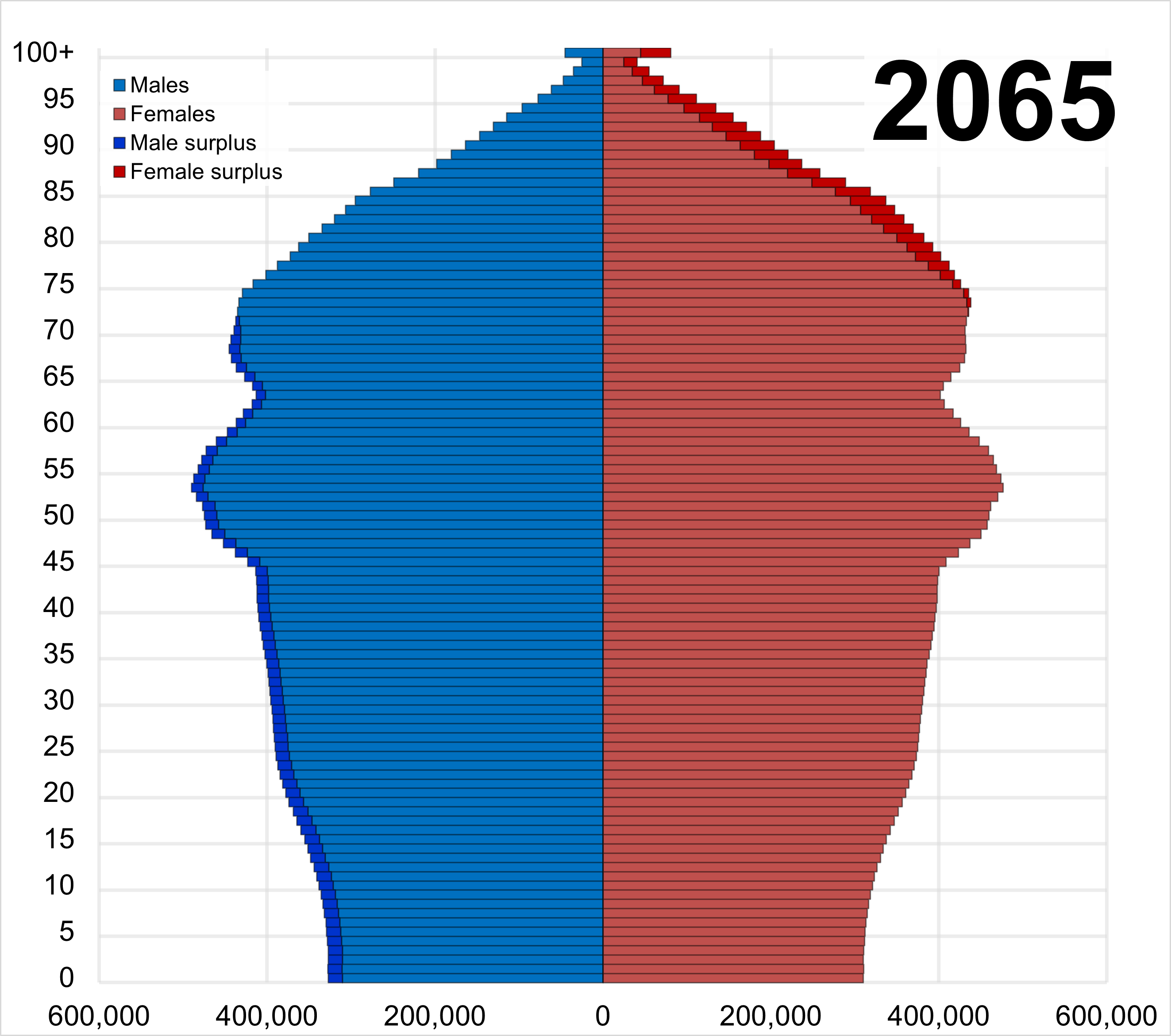
2065

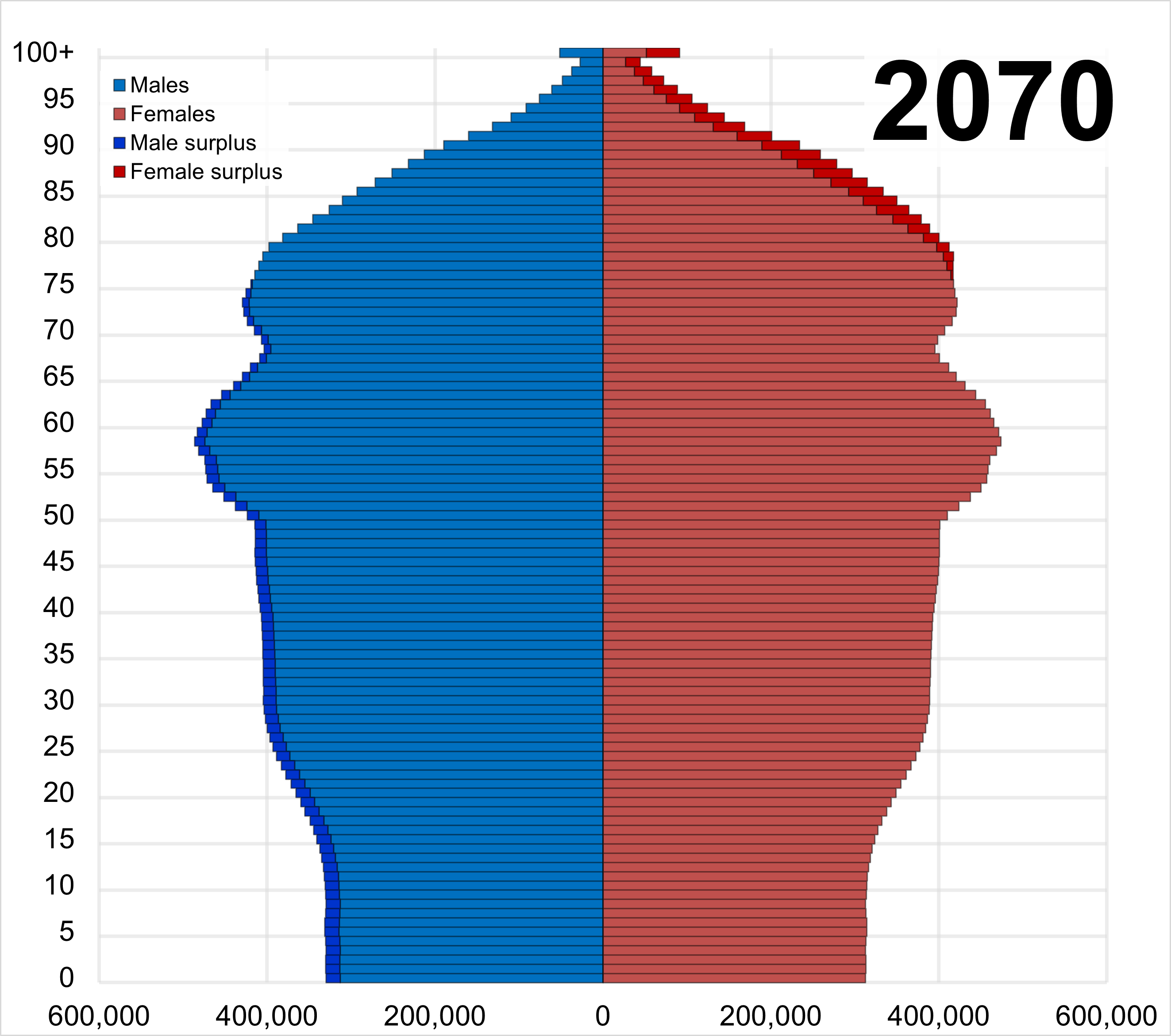
2070

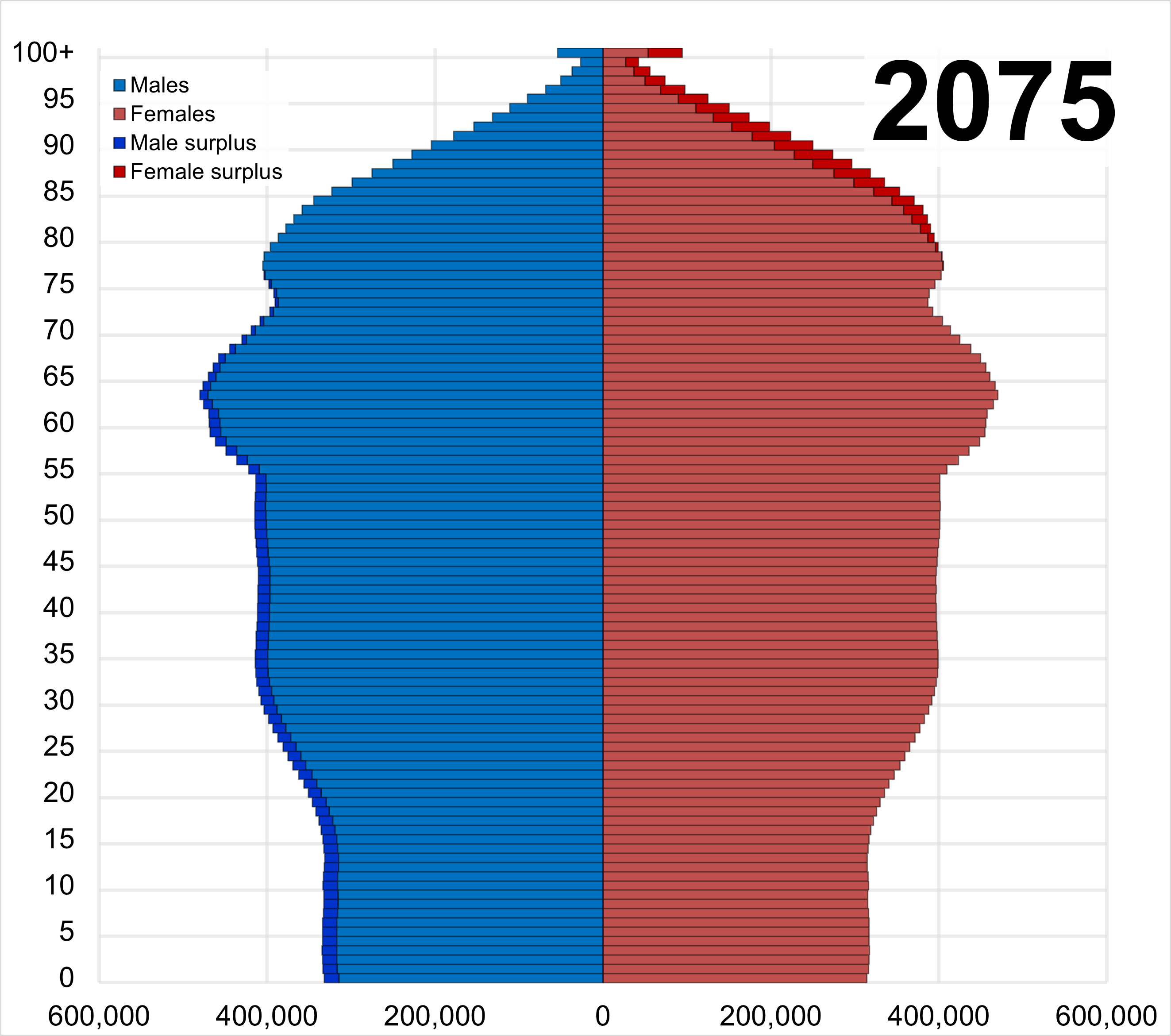
2075

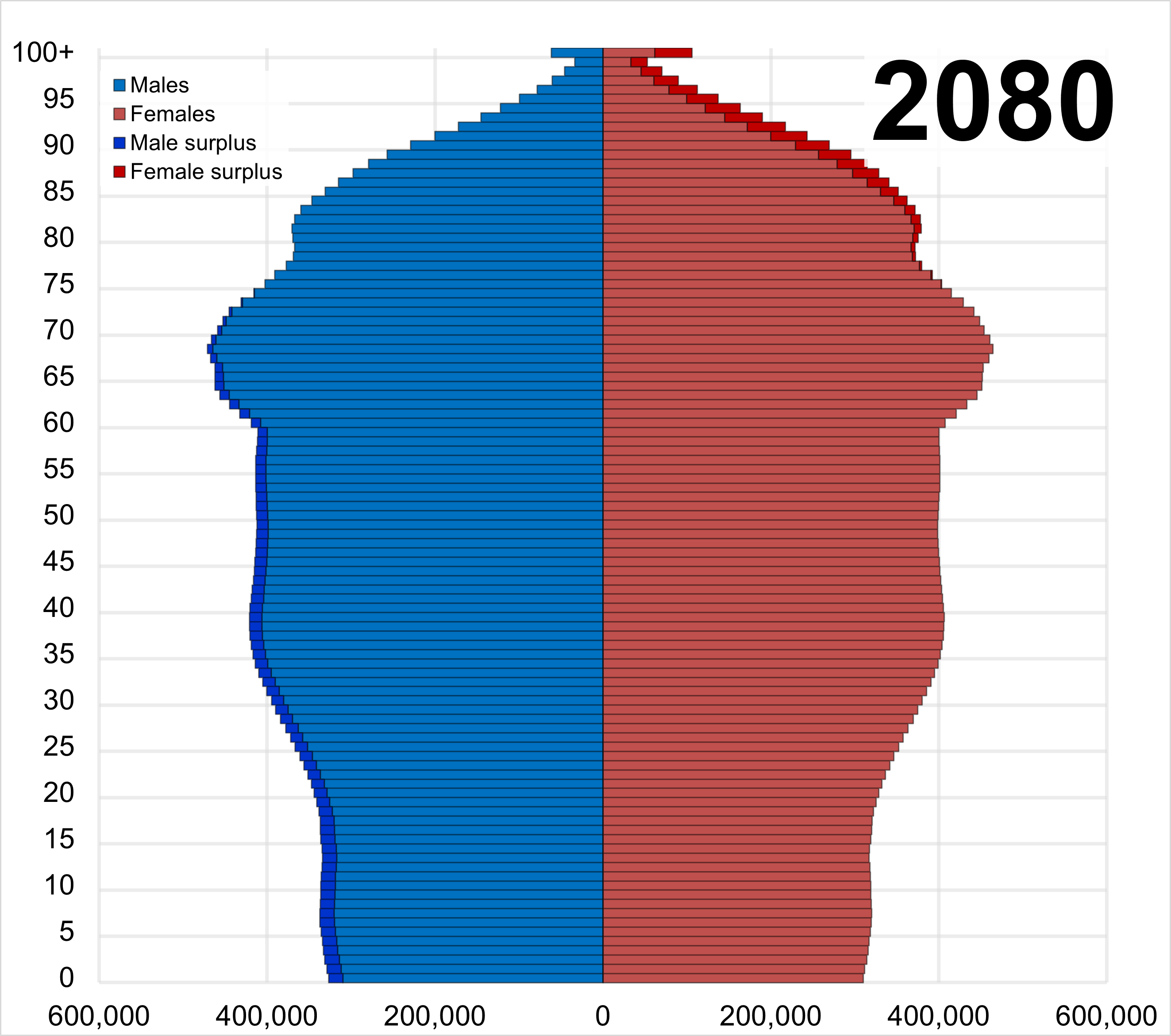
2080

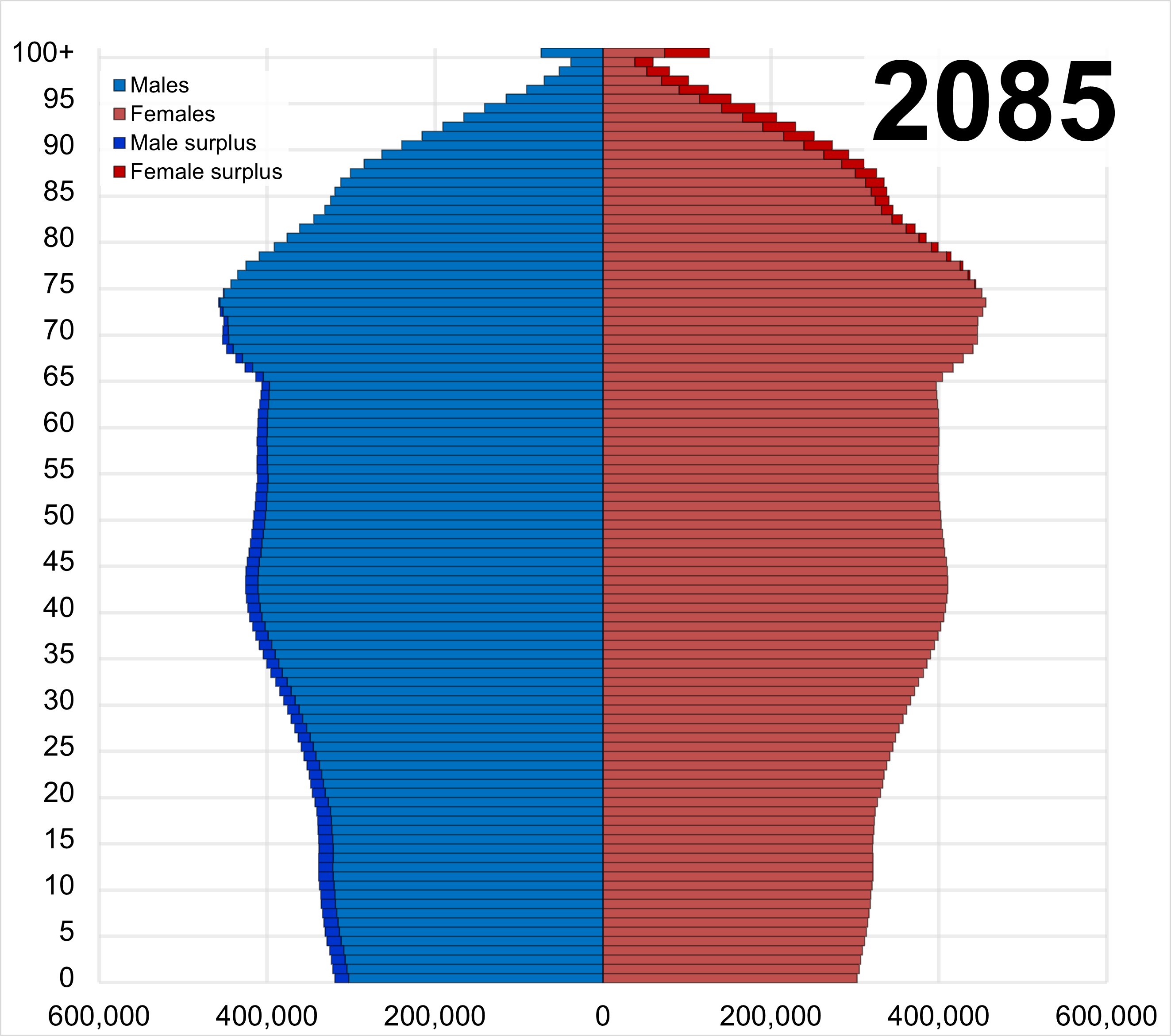
2085

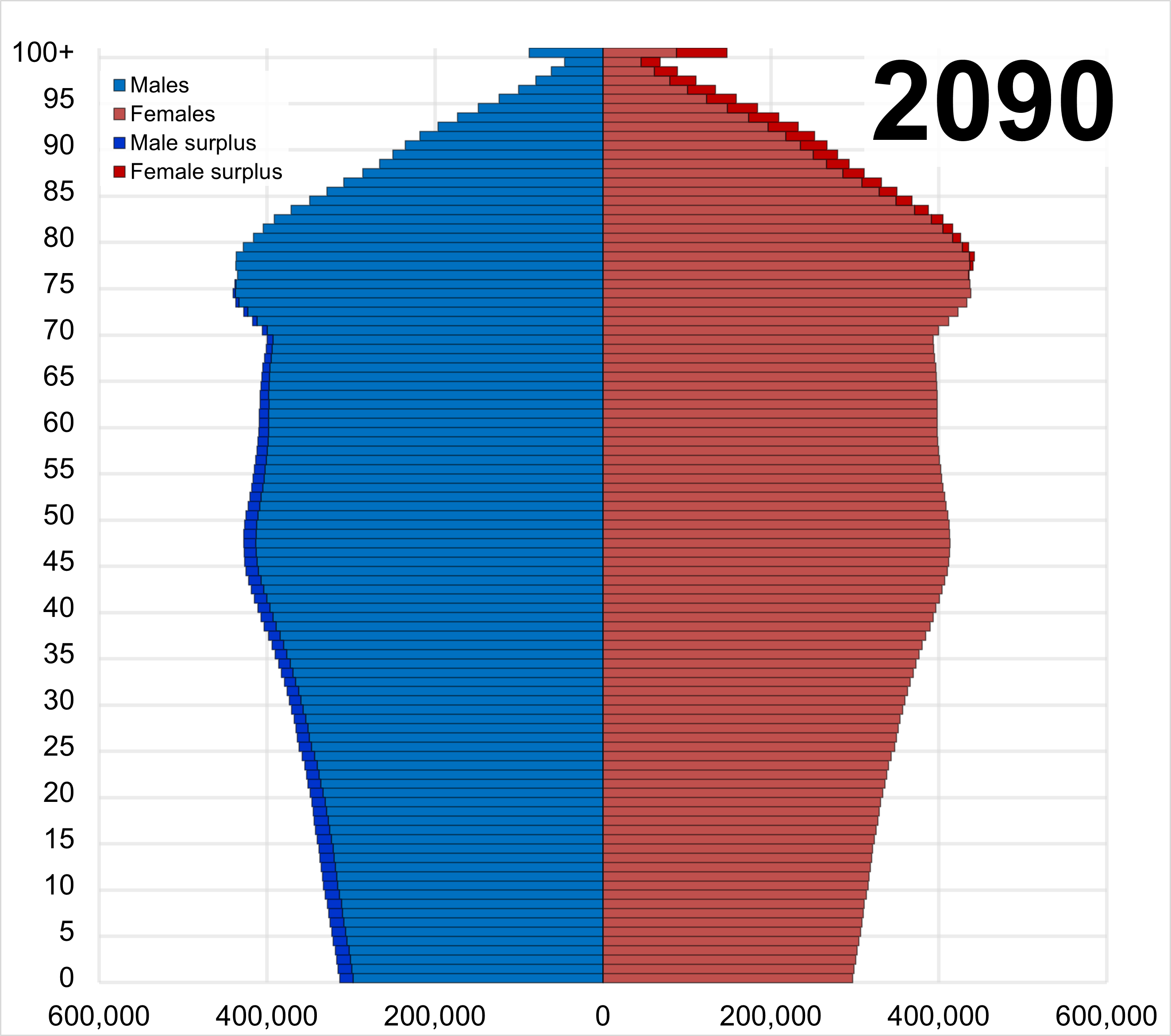
2090

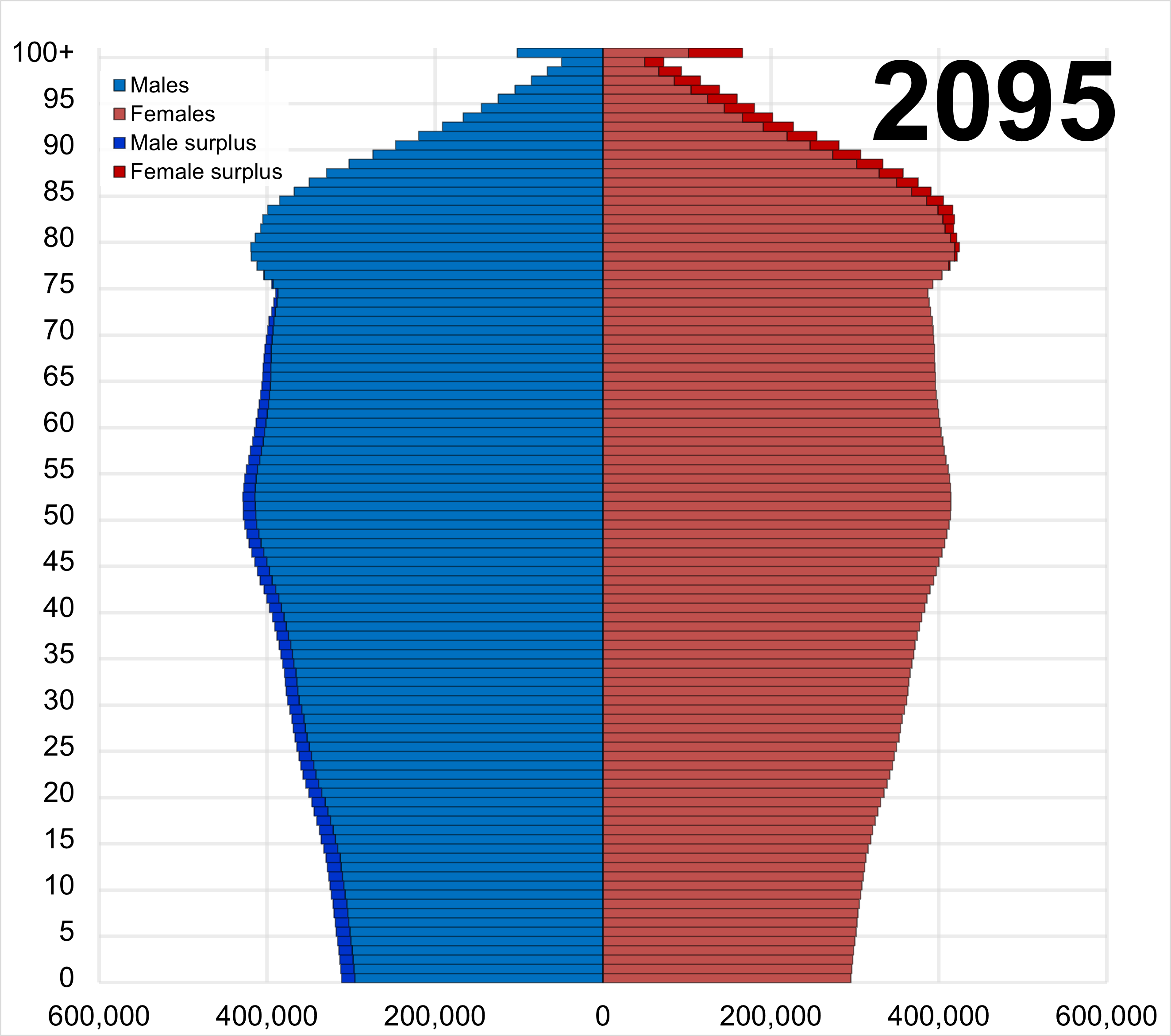
2095

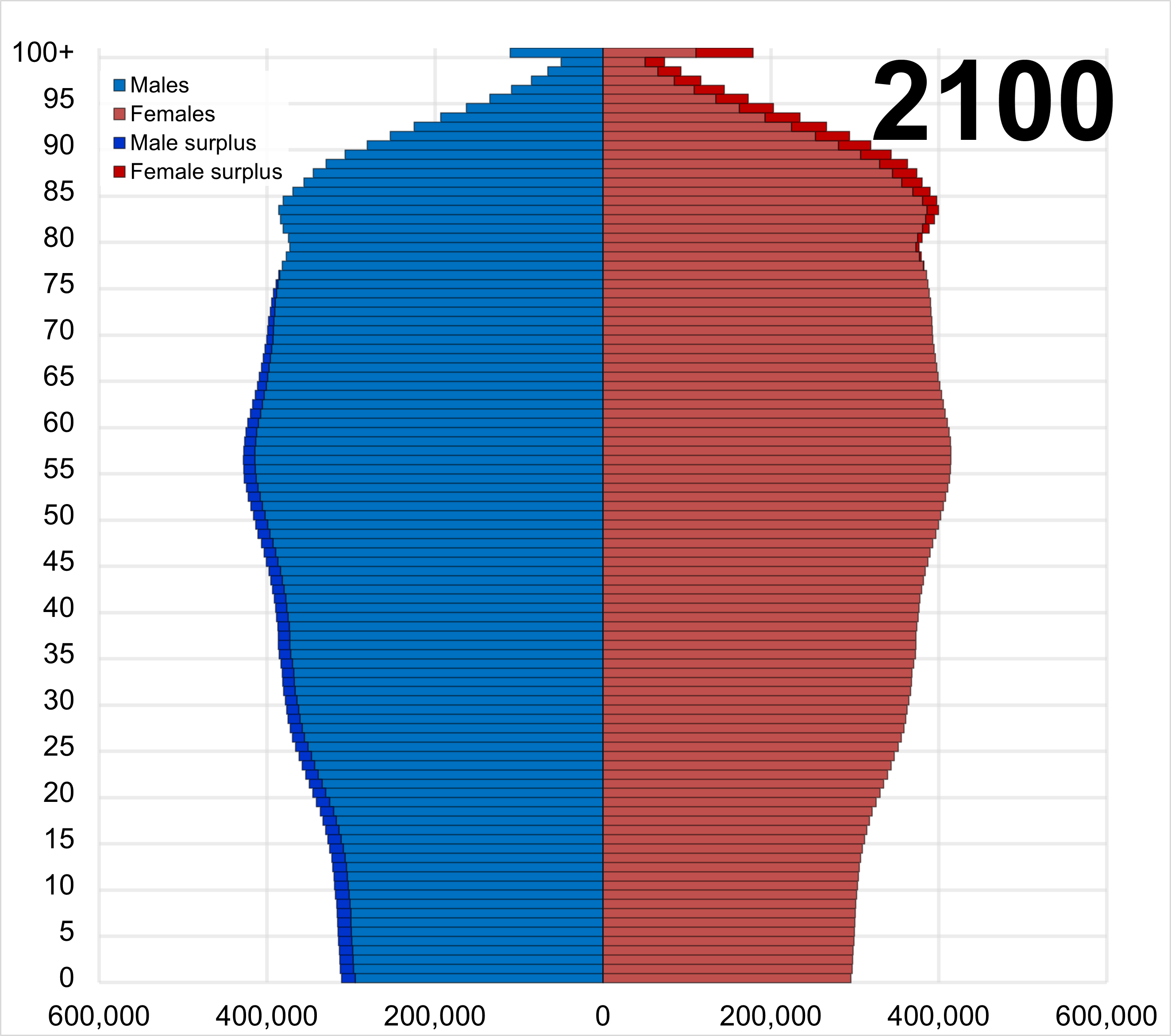
2100
