= Places of Worship Registration Act 1855 =

Act of the Parliament of the United Kingdom

Places of Worship Registration Act 1855 (Note: The citation of this act by this short title was authorised by section 1 of, and the first schedule to, the Short Titles Act 1896. Due to the repeal of those provisions it is now authorised by section 19(2) of the Interpretation Act 1978.)
- Act of Parliament
- Parliament of the United Kingdom
- Long title: An Act to amend the Law concerning the certifying and registering of Places of Religious Worship in England.
- Citation: 18 & 19 Vict. c. 81
- Territorial extent: England and Wales (Note: Section 14.)

Dates
- Royal assent: 30 July 1855
- Commencement: 30 July 1855 (Note: The Acts of Parliament (Commencement) Act 1793.)
Other legislation
| Repeals/revokes | Protestant Dissenters Act 1852 |
| Amended by | Irish Church Act 1869; Statute Law Revision Act 1892; Short Titles Act 1896; Public Expenditure and Receipts Act 1968; Registration of Births, Deaths and Marriages (Fees) Order 1968; Sharing of Church Buildings Act 1969; Statute Law (Repeals) Act 1977; Registration of Births, Deaths and Marriages (Fees) Order 1977; Interpretation Act 1978; Charities Act 1993; Transfer of Functions (Registration and Statistics) Order 1996; Transfer of Functions (Registration) Order 2008; Charities Act 2011; Immigration Act 2016 |
| Relates to | Toleration Act 1688, Roman Catholic Relief Act 1791, Places of Religious Worship Act 1812, Roman Catholic Charities Act 1832, Marriage Act 1836, Births and Deaths Registration Act 1836, Births and Deaths Registration Act 1837, Religious Disabilities Act 1846, Charitable Trusts Act 1853, Registration Service Act 1953, Births and Deaths Registration Act 1953 |

Status: Amended

Text of statute as originally enacted

Revised text of statute as amended

Text of the Places of Worship Registration Act 1855 as in force today (including any amendments) within the United Kingdom, from legislation.gov.uk.

The Places of Worship Registration Act 1855 (18 & 19 Vict. c. 81) is an act of the Parliament of the United Kingdom which governs the registration and legal recognition of places of worship. It applies only in England and Wales, and does not cover the Church of England (that country's established church) which is exempt from the act's requirements. Nor does it affect the Church in Wales, which remains part of the Anglican Communion although it is no longer the Established Church in Wales. Registration is not compulsory, but it gives certain financial advantages and is also required before a place of worship can be registered as a venue for marriages.

== Overview ==
Under the terms of the act, buildings, rooms or other premises can be registered as meeting places for religious worship upon payment of a fee; a record of their registration is then kept by the General Register Office for England and Wales, and the place of worship is assigned a "Worship Number". Registration is not mandatory, but an unregistered place of worship cannot be used for the solemnisation of marriages. There are also financial advantages: under the terms of the Charitable Trusts Act 1853 (as amended), registered places of worship are 'excepted charities', and do not have to subject their funds to inspection. Also, Council Tax is not levied on their premises. This exemption has applied since 1955. Since the passing of the Local Government Finance Act 1988, places of worship have not had to pay business rates; registration under the terms of the 1855 act, while apparently not essential to gain exemption, "is an additional piece of evidence that the property is actively used as a place of worship".

== Procedures ==
"Any person who is able to represent the congregation" of the place of worship—for example, a pastor, minister or trustee—may fill in a form published by the Home Office, Certifying a Place of Meeting for Religious Worship (Form 76), and send it to the Superintendent General of the General Register Office or a local Superintendent Registrar. A fee of £28.00 is payable. Details required on the form include the name, address and physical layout of the building or rooms, the Christian denomination or other faith group to which it belongs, an overview of the services that will take place, and details of the applicant. There is great flexibility in relation to the naming of the faith group for which the building is being registered: for example, the register contains entries for "Quaker", "Quakers", "Friends" and "Religious Society of Friends", all of which refer to the Quaker denomination. Furthermore, some faith groups do not have a name, or specifically reject the concept of denominational names. They are allowed to use the descriptions "Christians not otherwise designated" or "[a congregation or assembly of persons] who object to be designated by any distinctive religious appellation" respectively. As of 2010 there were more than 1,500 places of worship registered to "Christians not otherwise designated", representing more than 5% of the national total. (Note: 1,517 out of 29,372. A further 53 places of worship were registered with the "... who object to be designated ..." description.)

If a registered place of worship is demolished and rebuilt on a different site, it must be re-registered under its new identity and assigned a new Worship Number, but more minor structural alterations do not affect the registration. Changes of name must also be notified to the Superintendent General. A place of worship which falls out of use should be de-registered by submitting another form, Notice of Disuse of a Certified Place of Meeting for Religious Worship (Form 77), to the Superintendent General. Government advice states that this is a legal requirement, but research indicates that in practice not all disused places of worship are de-registered. Details of de-registered places of worship are recorded in The London Gazette. (Note: A standard form of wording is used to record de-registrations, as in this example from 1987: "The Registrar General, being satisfied that the Elim Church, 9 Hylton Road, Petersfield in the registration district of Petersfield in the non-metropolitan county of Hampshire and the Meeting Room, Brandreth Lane, Renders Corner, Plymouth in the registration district of Plymouth in the non-metropolitan county of Devon have wholly ceased to be used as places of worship by the congregations on whose behalf they were certified in accordance with the Places of Worship Registration Act 1855 has cancelled the record of their certifications.")

== History ==
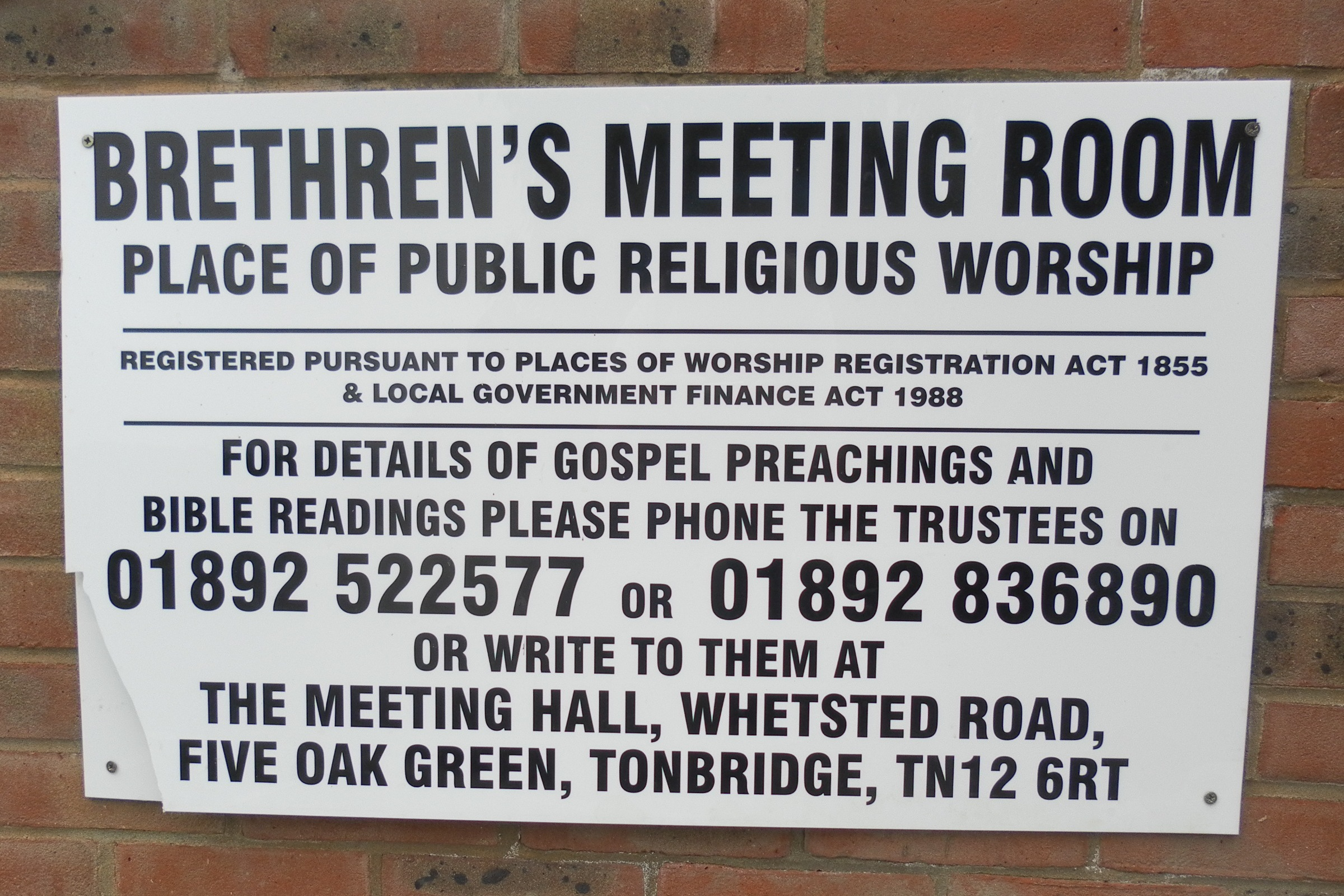
This sign at a Plymouth Brethren meeting hall in Five Oak Green, Kent, shows that it is registered according to the terms of the act.

The Toleration Act 1688 (1 Will. & Mar. c. 18)granted most Protestant Nonconformist denominations freedom to worship in public buildings or rooms that were registered for this purpose. Registration was done at a local level by a Clerk of the Peace or the local bishop. The Roman Catholic Relief Act 1791 (31 Geo. 3. c. 32) extended this freedom, and the obligation to register, to the Catholic Church. The Places of Religious Worship Certifying Act 1852 (15 & 16 Vict. c. 36) superseded these acts and gave the General Register Office the responsibility for maintaining the record of registered places of worship, but registration remained compulsory. The 1855 act made it optional, but for a building to be used for marriages it had to be registered for worship first (or at the same time).

The act stipulated that a list of all registered places of worship be published in 1856, "and also at such subsequent Periods as One of Her Majesty's Principal Secretaries of State shall from Time to Time in that Behalf order or direct". In practice, neither full details of all registered places of worship nor extracts from the list have routinely been published by the General Register Office, but the full list was published online in 2010 in response to a Freedom of Information Request. It lists all places of worship registered under the terms of the act (excluding those subsequently deregistered), and gives their local government district, Worship Number (their unique reference number), name, address and the denomination to which they belong. Also, a list of all registered places of worship was published on the government's gov.uk website on 17 March 2015 and has subsequently been updated regularly. It includes a list of around 30,000 records, including addresses and whether they are also registered for the solemnisation of marriages (opposite- and same-sex).

The fee for the registration of a place of worship has been revised upwards on many occasions. When the act was passed, registration cost 2s.6d. (equivalent to £11.64 in 2025). The most recent piece of legislation setting the fee at £28.00 was The Registration of Births, Deaths and Marriages (Fees) Order 2002, which came into effect from 1 April 2003.

== Case law ==
What counts as a place of worship has been the subject of litigation. An application by the Church of Scientology to have a chapel registered at Saint Hill Manor was rejected by the Registrar General in 1967. This rejection was upheld by the Court of Appeal in the case of R v Registrar General, ex p Segerdal. In 2013, the UK Supreme Court overturned Segerdal in the case of R (on the application of Hodkin and another) v Registrar General of Births, Deaths and Marriages, which concerned whether a marriage could be conducted at a Scientology property in London. Following the Hodkin decision, there is no longer a requirement of theistic belief in order to qualify as being a place of religious worship for the purpose of registration under the act.

== Subsequent developments ==
In section 2, the words from " by the said " to " mentioned and ", and in section 3, the words from " and no such " to " quarter sessions ", were repealed by section 1(1) of, and part V of schedule 1 to, the Statute Law (Repeals) Act 1977, which came into force on 16 June 1977. Section 13 of the act was repealed by section 1(1) of, and part XII of schedule 1 to, the 1977 act.
