= Liberty of Religious Worship Act 1855 =

Act of the Parliament of the United Kingdom

Liberty of Religious Worship Act 1855 (Note: The citation of this act by this short title was authorised by section 1 of, and the first schedule to, the Short Titles Act 1896. Due to the repeal of those provisions it is now authorised by section 19(2) of the Interpretation Act 1978.)
- Act of Parliament
- Parliament of the United Kingdom
- Long title: An Act for securing the Liberty of Religious Worship.
- Citation: 18 & 19 Vict. c. 86
- Territorial extent: United Kingdom

Dates
- Royal assent: 14 August 1855
- Commencement: 14 August 1855 (Note: Section 1.)
- Repealed: 16 November 1989
Other legislation
Amends	Toleration Act 1688; Places of Religious Worship Act 1812; Roman Catholic Charities Act 1832; Religious Disabilities Act 1846
Amended by	Statute Law (Repeals) Act 1977
Repealed by	Statute Law (Repeals) Act 1989

Status: Repealed

Text of statute as originally enacted

The Liberty of Religious Worship Act 1855 (18 & 19 Vict. c. 86) was an act of the Parliament of the United Kingdom.

Previously the Toleration Act 1689 (1 Will. & Mar. c. 18) (Note: This is the citation in The Statutes of the Realm.) required all Dissenting places of worship to be registered and the Places of Religious Worship Act 1812 (52 Geo. 3. c. 155) had reiterated that requirement for all Dissenting gatherings of over twenty people, at penalty of a forfeit of 20 shillings to £20 for building owners who failed to register. Part I of the 1855 act removed all penalties in the 1689 and 1812 acts and in the Protestant Dissenters Act 1852 for any services held by the curate or incumbent of any Church of England parish or ecclesiastical district, any congregation meeting in a "private Dwelling house or on the Premises belonging thereto" or any "Congregation or Assembly for Religious Worship" in a building or buildings "not usually appropriated to Purposes of Religious Worship", as well as all the penalties in those three acts for the buildings' owners for permitting their use for such services. Part II extended all post-1855 legislation on Dissenting congregations also to cover Roman Catholic and Jewish worship.

== Subsequent developments ==
The preamble to, and section 1 of, the act were repealed by section 1(1) of, and part V of schedule 1 to, the Statute Law (Repeals) Act 1977, which came into force on 16 June 1977.

The whole act was repealed by section 1(1) of, and part VIII of schedule 1 to, the Statute Law (Repeals) Act 1989, which came into force on 16 November 1989.
