= Commissioners for loyal and indigent officers =

Restoration-era English appointed offices

Distribution To Loyal Indigent Officers Act 1662
- Act of Parliament
- Parliament of England
- Long title: An Act for Distribution of Threescore thousand pounds amongst the truly Loyal & Indigent Commission Officers and for assessing of Offices and distributing the Moneys thereby raised for theire further supply.
- Citation: 14 Cha. 2. c. 8 (Note: This is the citation in The Statutes of the Realm.); 13 & 14 Cha. 2. c. 8 (Note: This is the citation in The Statutes at Large.)
- Territorial extent: England and Wales

Dates
- Royal assent: 19 May 1662
- Commencement: 7 January 1662 (Note: Start of session.)
- Repealed: 28 July 1863
Other legislation
Repealed by	Statute Law Revision Act 1863

Status: Repealed

Text of statute as originally enacted

The Commissioners for loyal and indigent officers were a body formed by the Distribution To Loyal Indigent Officers Act 1662 (14 Cha. 2. c. 8), an act of the Parliament of England to provide relief to impoverished Royalist officers who had served in the English Civil War.

After the English Restoration in 1660, the relief of those who had served Charles II and his father presented an important political issue. The act establishing the commission provided for the distribution of £60,000 among "loyal and indigent" officers certified by the commissioners.

The funds for relief were charged on the tax revenues of Cornwall, Rutland, Monmouthshire, Lancashire, Westmorland, and Anglesey authorised by the Taxation Act 1661 (13 Cha. 2. St. 2. c. 3). The commissioners were to choose a treasurer who would receive the funds from the receivers-general of those counties for disbursal. Commissioners were named for each county, who were to examine applicants and provide certificates attesting to the rank, service, loyalty, and indigence of former officers. These would be dispatched to regular meetings of some of the commissioners at Westminster, who would issue warrants for payment to the holders of certificates. Higher-ranking officers were to receive more relief, in proportion to the salaries of serving officers. The certificate-holders were also to be granted preference in admission to charities and hospitals. Distribution was to end on 29 September 1662.

A list of claimants was printed in 1663, which serves as a useful source for identification of Royalist officers. This was a response to the commissioners' difficulties in controlling fraud: some of the claimants were accused of having inflated their army rank to receive a greater share of the distribution, or of having made claims based on officers' commissions they never exercised in the field. However, modern scholars judge the published list to be fairly accurate; contemporary suspicions may have arisen due to regional rivalries, as the £60,000 appropriated proved to be inadequate to relieve the needs of the many claimants. The act was amended in 1663 to allow the commissioners to examine witnesses in certain cases of suspected fraud and extended the deadline for payment to 24 September 1663.

The Taxation Act 1670 (22 & 23 Cha. 2. c. 21) provided for a commission to take the accounts of the treasurers, receivers, and collectors for the £60,000.
