= List of acts of the Parliament of England from 1662 =

This is a list of acts of the Parliament of England for the year 1662.

For acts passed during the period 1707–1800, see the list of acts of the Parliament of Great Britain. See also the list of acts of the Parliament of Scotland, and the list of acts of the Parliament of Ireland.

For acts passed from 1801 onwards, see the list of acts of the Parliament of the United Kingdom. For acts of the devolved parliaments and assemblies in the United Kingdom, see the list of acts of the Scottish Parliament, the list of acts of the Northern Ireland Assembly, and the list of acts and measures of Senedd Cymru; see also the list of acts of the Parliament of Northern Ireland.

For medieval statutes, etc. that are not considered to be acts of Parliament, see the list of English statutes.

See also the List of ordinances and acts of the Parliament of England, 1642–1660 for ordinances and acts passed by the Long Parliament and other bodies without royal assent, and which were not considered to be valid legislation following the Restoration in 1660.

The number shown after each act's title is its chapter number. Acts are cited using this number, preceded by the years of the reign during which the relevant parliamentary session was held; thus the Union with Ireland Act 1800 is cited as "39 & 40 Geo. 3. c. 67", meaning the 67th act passed during the session that started in the 39th year of the reign of George III and which finished in the 40th year of that reign. The modern convention is to use Arabic numerals in citations (thus "41 Geo. 3" rather than "41 Geo. III"). Acts of the last session of the Parliament of Great Britain and the first session of the Parliament of the United Kingdom are both cited as "41 Geo. 3".

Acts passed by the Parliament of England did not have a short title; however, some of these acts have subsequently been given a short title by acts of the Parliament of the United Kingdom, such as the Short Titles Act 1896 (59 & 60 Vict. c. 14).

Acts passed by the Parliament of England were deemed to have come into effect on the first day of the session in which they were passed. Because of this, the years given in the list below may in fact be the year before a particular act was passed.

== 14 Cha. 2 ==
The third part of the first session of the 2nd Parliament of King Charles II (the 'Cavalier Parliament') which met from 7 January 1662 until 19 May 1662.

This session was also traditionally cited as 14 Car. 2, 14 Chas. 2 or 14 C. 2.

Cited as "14 Car. 2" (14 Cha. 2) in The Statutes of the Realm, and "13 & 14 Car. 2" (13 & 14 Cha. 2) in Ruffhead-Pickering The Statutes at Large.

=== Public acts ===
Short title	Citation	Royal assent
Long title
Quakers Act 1662 or the Quaker Act 1662 (repealed)	14 Cha. 2. c. 1 (Note: This is the citation in The Statutes of the Realm.); 13 & 14 Cha. 2. c. 1 (Note: This is the citation in The Statutes at Large.)	2 May 1662
An Act for preventing the Mischiefs and Dangers that may arise, by certain Persons called Quakers, and others, refusing to take lawful Oaths. (Repealed by Places of Religious Worship Act 1812 (52 Geo. 3. c. 155))
London and Westminster Streets Act 1662 (repealed)	14 Cha. 2. c. 2; 13 & 14 Cha. 2. c. 2	2 May 1662
An Act for repairing the High wayes and Sewers and for paving and keeping clean of the Streets in and about the Cities of London & Westminster and for reforming of Annoyances and Disorders in the Streets of and places adjacent to the said Cities and for the Regulating and Licensing of Hackney Coaches and for the enlarging of several strait & inconvenient Streets and Passages. (Repealed by Statute Law Revision Act 1948 (11 & 12 Geo. 6. c. 62))
City of London Militia Act 1662 or the Militia Act 1662	14 Cha. 2. c. 3; 13 & 14 Cha. 2. c. 3	19 May 1662
An Act for ordering the Forces in the several Counties of this Kingdom.
Act of Uniformity 1662 or the Bartholomew Act	14 Cha. 2. c. 4; 13 & 14 Cha. 2. c. 4	19 May 1662
An Act for the Uniformity of Publique Prayers and Administracion of Sacramentes & other Rites & Ceremonies and for establishing the Form of making ordaining and consecrating Bishops Preists and Deacons in the Church of England. (Repealed for Northern Ireland by Statute Law Revision Act 1950 (14 Geo. 6. c. 6))
Making of Stuffs in Norfolk and Norwich Act 1662 (repealed)	14 Cha. 2. c. 5; 13 & 14 Cha. 2. c. 5	19 May 1662
An Act for regulating the making of Stuffs in Norfolke and Norwich. (Repealed by Statute Law Revision Act 1863 (26 & 27 Vict. c. 125))
Highways Act 1662 (repealed)	14 Cha. 2. c. 6; 13 & 14 Cha. 2. c. 6	19 May 1662
An Act for enlarging and repairing of Common Highwayes. (Repealed by Statute Law Revision Act 1863 (26 & 27 Vict. c. 125))
Exportation of Leather Act 1662 (repealed)	14 Cha. 2. c. 7; 13 & 14 Cha. 2. c. 7	19 May 1662
An Act to restrain the Exportation of Leather and Raw Hides out of the Realme of England. (Repealed by Statute Law Revision Act 1863 (26 & 27 Vict. c. 125))
Distribution To Loyal Indigent Officers Act 1662 (repealed)	14 Cha. 2. c. 8; 13 & 14 Cha. 2. c. 8	19 May 1662
An Act for Distribution of Threescore thousand pounds amongst the truly Loyal & Indigent Commission Officers and for assessing of Offices and distributing the Moneys thereby raised for theire further supply. (Repealed by Statute Law Revision Act 1863 (26 & 27 Vict. c. 125))
Relief of Poor and Maimed Officers and Soldiers Act 1662 (repealed)	14 Cha. 2. c. 9; 13 & 14 Cha. 2. c. 9	19 May 1662
An Act for the releife of poore and maimed Officers and Souldiers who have faithfully served His Majesty and His Royal Father in the late Wars. (Repealed by Statute Law Revision Act 1863 (26 & 27 Vict. c. 125))
Fire-Hearth and Stoves Taxation Act 1662 (repealed)	14 Cha. 2. c. 10; 13 & 14 Cha. 2. c. 10	19 May 1662
An Act for establishing an additional Revenue upon His Majestie His Heires & Successors for the better support of His and theire Crown and Dignity. (Repealed by Hearth Money Act 1688 (1 Will. & Mar. c. 10))
Customs Act 1662 (repealed)	14 Cha. 2. c. 11; 13 & 14 Cha. 2. c. 11	19 May 1662
An Act for preventing Frauds and regulating Abuses in His Majesties Customes. (Repealed by Customs Law Repeal Act 1825 (6 Geo. 4. c. 105))
Poor Relief Act 1662 or the Settlement Act 1662 or the Settlement and Removal Act 1662 (repealed)	14 Cha. 2. c. 12; 13 & 14 Cha. 2. c. 12	19 May 1662
An Acte for the better Releife of the Poore of this Kingdom. (Repealed by Poor Law Act 1927 (17 & 18 Geo. 5. c. 14) and Statute Law Revision Act 1948 (11 & 12 Geo. 6. c. 62))
Foreign Bone-lace, etc. Act 1662 (repealed)	14 Cha. 2. c. 13; 13 & 14 Cha. 2. c. 13	19 May 1662
An Act prohibiting the Importacion of Forreign Bonelace Cutt worke Imbroidery Fringe Band-strings Buttons and Needle worke. (Repealed by Customs Law Repeal Act 1825 (6 Geo. 4. c. 105))
Prize Goods Act 1662 (repealed)	14 Cha. 2. c. 14; 13 & 14 Cha. 2. c. 14	19 May 1662
An Act directing the Prosecution of such as are accomptable for Prize Goods. (Repealed by Statute Law Revision Act 1863 (26 & 27 Vict. c. 125))
Silk Throwing Act 1662 (repealed)	14 Cha. 2. c. 15; 13 & 14 Cha. 2. c. 15	19 May 1662
An Act for regulating the Trade of Silk throwing. (Repealed by Statute Law Revision Act 1863 (26 & 27 Vict. c. 125))
Accountants Excepted from Act of Oblivion Act 1662 (repealed)	14 Cha. 2. c. 16; 13 & 14 Cha. 2. c. 16	19 May 1662
An Act for the more speedy and effectual bringing those persons to accompt whose Accompts are excepted in the Act of Oblivion. (Repealed by Statute Law Revision Act 1863 (26 & 27 Vict. c. 125))
Collectors of Public Money Act 1662 (repealed)	14 Cha. 2. c. 17; 13 & 14 Cha. 2. c. 17	19 May 1662
An Act for Releife of Collectors of Publick Moneys and theire Assistants and Deputies. (Repealed by Statute Law Revision Act 1863 (26 & 27 Vict. c. 125))
Wool Act 1662 (repealed)	14 Cha. 2. c. 18; 13 & 14 Cha. 2. c. 18	19 May 1662
An Act against exporting of Sheepe, Wooll, Woolfells, Mortlings, Shorlings, Yarn made of Wool, Woolflocks, Fullers Earth, Fulling Clay, and Tobacco pipe Clay. (Repealed by Repeal of Obsolete Statutes Act 1856 (19 & 20 Vict. c. 64))
Foreign Wool-cards etc. Act 1662 (repealed)	14 Cha. 2. c. 19; 13 & 14 Cha. 2. c. 19	19 May 1662
An Act against importing of Foreign Wool cards Card wire or Iron wire. (Repealed by Customs Law Repeal Act 1825 (6 Geo. 4. c. 105))
Navy and Ordnance Act 1662 (repealed)	14 Cha. 2. c. 20; 13 & 14 Cha. 2. c. 20	19 May 1662
An Act for providing Carriage by Land and by Water for the use of His Majesties Navy and Ordnance. (Repealed by Statute Law Revision Act 1863 (26 & 27 Vict. c. 125))
Expenses of Sheriffs Act 1662 (repealed)	14 Cha. 2. c. 21; 13 & 14 Cha. 2. c. 21	19 May 1662
An Act for preventing the unnecessary charge of Sheriffes and for ease in passing theire Accompts. (Repealed by Sheriffs Act 1887 (50 & 51 Vict. c. 55))
Moss Troopers Act 1662 (repealed)	14 Cha. 2. c. 22; 13 & 14 Cha. 2. c. 22	19 May 1662
An Act for preventing of Theft and Rapine upon the Northern Borders of England. (Repealed by Statute Law Revision Act 1863 (26 & 27 Vict. c. 125))
Policies of Assurance Act 1662 (repealed)	14 Cha. 2. c. 23; 13 & 14 Cha. 2. c. 23	19 May 1662
An Addicional Act concerning matters of Assurance used amongst Merchants. (Repealed by Statute Law Revision Act 1863 (26 & 27 Vict. c. 125))
Bankrupts Act 1662 (repealed)	14 Cha. 2. c. 24; 13 & 14 Cha. 2. c. 24	19 May 1662
An Act declaratory concerning Bankrupts. (Repealed by Bankruptcy Act 1825 (6 Geo. 4. c. 16))
Legal Proceedings During Commonwealth Act 1662 (repealed)	14 Cha. 2. c. 25; 13 & 14 Cha. 2. c. 25	19 May 1662
An Act for the restoring of all such Advowsons Rectories Impropriate Gleeb Lands & Tithes to His Majesties Loyal Subjects as were taken from them and making void certain charges imposed on them upon theire Compositions for Delinquency by the late usurped Powers. (Repealed by Statute Law Revision Act 1948 (11 & 12 Geo. 6. c. 62))
Packing of Butter Act 1662 (repealed)	14 Cha. 2. c. 26; 13 & 14 Cha. 2. c. 26	19 May 1662
An Act for reforming of Abuses committed in the Weight and false Packing of Butter. (Repealed by Sale of Butter Act 1796 (36 Geo. 3. c. 86))
Dover Harbour Repairs Act 1662 (repealed)	14 Cha. 2. c. 27; 13 & 14 Cha. 2. c. 27	19 May 1662
An Act for repairing of Dover Harbour. (Repealed by Statute Law Revision Act 1948 (11 & 12 Geo. 6. c. 62))
Pilchard Fishing Act 1662 (repealed)	14 Cha. 2. c. 28; 13 & 14 Cha. 2. c. 28	19 May 1662
An Act for the regulating of the Pilchard Fishing in the Counties of Devon and Cornwall. (Repealed by Sea Fisheries Act 1868 (31 & 32 Vict. c. 45))
Strafford Attainder Act 1662 (repealed)	14 Cha. 2. c. 29 (Note: Also listed as 14 Cha. 2. c. 5 Pr.); 13 & 14 Cha. 2. c. 29	19 May 1662
An Act for the reversing the Earle of Strafford his Attainder. (Repealed by Statute Law Revision Act 1948 (11 & 12 Geo. 6. c. 62))
Madder Act 1662 (repealed)	14 Cha. 2. c. 30; 13 & 14 Cha. 2. c. 30	19 May 1662
An Act for the importing of Madder pure and unmixed. (Repealed by Fisheries, etc. Act 1663 (15 Cha. 2. c. 16))
Coin Act 1662 (repealed)	14 Cha. 2. c. 31; 13 & 14 Cha. 2. c. 31	19 May 1662
An Act to prevent the Inconvenience arising by melting the Silver Coyn of this Realm. (Repealed by Resumption of Cash Payments, etc. Act 1819 (59 Geo. 3. c. 49))
Woollen Cloth Act 1662 (repealed)	14 Cha. 2. c. 32; 13 & 14 Cha. 2. c. 32	19 May 1662
An Act for the better regulating of the Manufacture of Broad Woollen Cloath within the West Riding of the County of Yorke. (Repealed by Statute Law Revision Act 1863 (26 & 27 Vict. c. 125))
Licensing of the Press Act 1662 or the Printing Act 1662 or the Licensing Act 1662 (repealed)	14 Cha. 2. c. 33; 13 & 14 Cha. 2. c. 33	19 May 1662
An Act for preventing the frequent Abuses in printing seditious treasonable and unlicensed Books and Pamphlets and for regulating of Printing and Printing Presses. (Repealed by Statute Law Revision Act 1863 (26 & 27 Vict. c. 125))

=== Private acts ===
Short title	Citation	Royal assent
Long title
Settlement of estate of James Duke of Richmond and Lenos (Lennox) according to the agreement between Charles Duke of Richmond and Lenos, Mary Dowager Duchess of Richmond and Lenos, her trustees and her daughter Lady Mary.	14 Cha. 2. c. 1 Pr.	19 May 1662
An Act for settling of the Estate of James late Duke of Richmond and Lenos, according to Agreement of Charles Duke of Richmond and Lenos, Mary Dutchess Dowager of Richmond and Lenos, and the Lady Mary her Daughter, and the Trustees of the said Dutchess.
Duke of Albemarle: confirmation of letters patent granting him honours, manors and hereditaments.	14 Cha. 2. c. 2 Pr.	19 May 1662
An Act for Confirmation of certain Letters Patents made, and to be made, to the Right Noble Lord George Duke of Albemarle, of several Honours, Manors, and Hereditaments, granted, or mentioned to be granted, to him by His Majesty.
Confirmation of John Marquis of Winchester's estate in certain manors and lands whose deeds and evidences were burnt and lost at the taking of Basing Castle (Hampshire).	14 Cha. 2. c. 3 Pr.	19 May 1662
An Act for confirming the Estate of John Marquis of Winchester, in certain Manors and Lands whereof the Deeds and Evidences were burnt and lost at the Taking of the Castle of Basing.
Ferdinando Earl of Huntingdon's Estate Act 1662	14 Cha. 2. c. 4 Pr.	19 May 1662
An Act to confirm the Sale of certain Lands, sold by Ferdinando late Earl of Huntingdon, for the Payment of his own and his Father's Debts."
Strafford Attainder Act 1662 (repealed)	14 Cha. 2. c. 5 Pr. (Note: Also listed as 14 Cha. 2. c. 29.)	19 May 1662
An Act for the reversing the Earle of Strafford his Attainder. (Repealed by the Statute Law Revision Act 1948 (11 & 12 Geo. 6. c. 62))
Settling upon Viscount Campden a mansion house in Kensington.	14 Cha. 2. c. 6 Pr.	19 May 1662
An Act for settling a Capital Messuage, or Mansion-house, with the Appurtenances, in Kensington, in the County of Midd. upon Baptist Viscount Campden and his Heirs.
Confirmation of an Act for Lord Culpeper's restoration.	14 Cha. 2. c. 7 Pr.	19 May 1662
An Act for confirming an Act, (Note: Restoration of Lord Colepeper Act 1660 (12 Cha. 2. c. 9 Pr.)) for restoring to Thomas Lord Culpeper, Son and Heir and sole Executor of John Lord Culpeper, Baron of Thorsway, and Master of The Rolls, deceased, all his Honours, Manors, Lands, and Tenements, Leases not determined, and Hereditaments whatsoever, whereof the said John Lord Culpeper was in Possession on the 20th Day of May 1642, or at any Time after, which have not been sold or aliened by the said John late Lord Culpeper, by Acts or Assurances to which himself was Party and consenting.
Enabling Bishop of London to lease out tenements built on the site of his palace in London.	14 Cha. 2. c. 8 Pr.	19 May 1662
An Act to enable the Bishop of London to lease out Tenements, now built upon the Site of his Palace in London.
Naturalization of Philadelphia, Lady Wentworth Act 1662	14 Cha. 2. c. 9 Pr.	19 May 1662
An Act for the Naturalizing of Philadelphia Wife of the Right Honourable Thomas Lord Wentworth.
Confirmation of several Acts (12 Cha. 2 cc. 6, 15, 20 and 25).	14 Cha. 2. c. 10 Pr.	19 May 1662
An Act for confirming several Acts, (Note: Restoration of Sir George Lane Act 1660 (12 Cha. 2. c. 6 Pr.)) (Note: Lord Ormond (Restoration of Lands, etc., in Ireland) Act 1660 (12 Cha. 2. c. 15 Pr.)) (Note: Sir George Hamilton Restoration Act 1660 (12 Cha. 2. c. 20 Pr.)) (Note: Naturalization of John Boreel Act 1660 (12 Cha. 2. c. 25 Pr.)) therein mentioned.
Confirmation of two Acts (12 Cha. 2 cc. 5 and 14).	14 Cha. 2. c. 11 Pr.	19 May 1662
An Act for confirming of Two Acts, (Note: Restoration of Marquis of Newcastle Act 1660 (12 Cha. 2. c. 5 Pr.)) (Note: Estate of Sir George Booth Act 1660 (12 Cha. 2. c. 14 Pr.)) therein mentioned.
Viscount Scudamore's endowment of churches in Ireland.	14 Cha. 2. c. 12 Pr.	19 May 1662
An Act for the Endowment of several Churches, by the Lord Viscount Scudamore, of Sligo, in the Realm of Ireland.
Disuniting the hundreds of Dudston and Kings Barton from the county of the city of Gloucester and restoring them to the county of Gloucester.	14 Cha. 2. c. 13 Pr.	19 May 1662
An Act for the disuniting the Hundreds of Dudston and Kingsbarton from the County of the City of Gloucester, and restoring them to be Part of the County of Gloucester.
Rivers Stour and Salwarpe Navigation Act 1662	14 Cha. 2. c. 14 Pr.	19 May 1662
An Act for making navigable the Rivers of Stower and Salwerp, and the Rivulets and Brooks running into the same, in the Counties of Worcester and Stafford.
Rivers Wye and Lugg Navigation Act 1662 (repealed)	14 Cha. 2. c. 15 Pr.	19 May 1662
An Act for making navigable the Rivers of Wye and Lugg, and the Rivers and Brooks running into the same, in the Counties of Hereford, Gloucester, and Monmouth. (Repealed by Gloucester Harbour Revision (Constitution) Order 2002 (SI 2002/3268))
Sir James Enyons' Estate Act 1662	14 Cha. 2. c. 16 Pr.	19 May 1662
An Act for settling certain Manors and Lands, late of Sir James Enyons Baronet, on Sir Henry Puckering, alias Newton, Baronet, and Sir Charles Aderley Knight, his surviving Trustees, to sell, for Payment of his Debts.
River Ancholm Level Act 1662	14 Cha. 2. c. 17 Pr.	19 May 1662
An Act for confirming of several Decrees of Sewers, made by the Commissioners of the Limits of the Level of the River of Antholme, in the County of Lyncolne.
Confirmation of decree made for Thomas Derham and the improvements, exchanges and allotments mentioned in it.	14 Cha. 2. c. 18 Pr.	19 May 1662
An Act for confirming a Decree made on the Behalf of Thomas Deereham Esquire, and the Improvements, Exchanges, and Allotments, therein mentioned.
Sir Thomas Lee's Estate Act 1662	14 Cha. 2. c. 19 Pr.	19 May 1662
An Act for the enabling Sir Thomas Lee Baronet to exchange some Lands, settled upon the Marriage of Dame Anne Lee his now Wife, in Consideration of another Settlement of Lands of equal Value, in Lieu thereof.
Discharge of manors of Stodscomb and Holwell and other lands in Devon from the trust of 150 years made to Earls of Exeter, Bridgewater and Bolingbrooke.	14 Cha. 2. c. 20 Pr.	19 May 1662
An Act for discharging the Manors of Stodscombe and Hollwell, and other Lands in the County of Devon, from the Trust of One Hundred and Fifty Years, made unto John Earl of Exon, John Earl of Bridgwater, and Oliver Earl of Bolingbrooke.
Rectification of defect in a deed for settling manors and lands on Sir Henry Frederick Thynne.	14 Cha. 2. c. 21 Pr.	19 May 1662
An Act for supplying a supposed Defect of the Words ["stands and be seised"] in a Deed for settling of divers Manors and Lands on Sir Henry Frederick Thynn."
Confirmation of estates of a number of his Majesty's copyhold tenants within the honour of Clitheroe (Lancashire).	14 Cha. 2. c. 22 Pr.	19 May 1662
An Act for confirming the Estates of divers of His Majesty's Copyhold Tenants, within the Honour of Clitheroe, in the County Palatine of Lancaster, according to several Decrees in the Court of Dutchy Chamber of the said County Palatine.
Confirmation of estates of several tenants and copyholders of the manors of Rannes, Irchester, Rushdon and others (Lancashire).	14 Cha. 2. c. 23 Pr.	19 May 1662
An Act for Confirmation of the Estates of divers Tenants and Copyholders of the Manors of Rannes, Irchester, Rushden, and several other Manors, Parcels of the Dutchy of Lancaster.
Piedmont Protestants collection Act confirmation, explanation and enlargement.	14 Cha. 2. c. 24 Pr.	19 May 1662
An Act for confirming, explaining, and enlarging an Act, intituled, "An Act for the levying of certain Monies, due upon the Collections for the Protestants of Piedmont." (Note: Protestants of Piedmont Levy Act 1660 (12 Cha. 2. c. 24 Pr.))
William Milward's Estate Act 1662	14 Cha. 2. c. 25 Pr.	19 May 1662
An Act to enable the Sale of some of the Lands of William Milward Esquire, for Payment of some of his Debts.
Sir Robert and William Dallison's Estate Act 1662	14 Cha. 2. c. 26 Pr.	19 May 1662
An Act vesting certain Lands in Bleasby, in Sir John Mounson the Younger, Robert Thorold Esquire, and Anthony Eyre the Elder, Esquire, and their Heirs, to sell Land, for Payment of the Debts of Sir Robert Dallyson and William Dallyson.
Henry Nevil's Estate Act 1662	14 Cha. 2. c. 27 Pr.	19 May 1662
An Act to enable the Trustees of Henry Nevill Esquire to sell certain Manors, Lands, and Tenements, in the Counties of Yorke and Leicester, for Payment of his and his Son William Nevill's Debts; and likewise to confirm and strengthen the Sale of such Lands as they have already sold in the County of Yorke.
Making void certain fines levied by Sir Edward and Dame Mary Powel.	14 Cha. 2. c. 28 Pr.	19 May 1662
An Act for the making void certain Fines unduly procured to be levied, by Sir Edward Powell Knight and Baronet, and Dame Mary his Wife.
Sir Robert Slingsby's Estate Act 1662	14 Cha. 2. c. 29 Pr.	19 May 1662
An Act for Sale of Sir Robert Slyngsby, deceased, his Land, for Payment of his Debts.
Sir Anthony Brown's Estate Act 1662	14 Cha. 2. c. 30 Pr.	19 May 1662
An Act for enabling Sir Anthony Browne to sell Lands, for Payment of Debts.
Anthony Etrick's Estate Act 1662	14 Cha. 2. c. 31 Pr.	19 May 1662
An Act for enabling Anthony Ettrick to sell Lands, for Payment of his Debts.
Naturalization of Anna Ferrers and others.	14 Cha. 2. c. 32 Pr.	19 May 1662
An Act for the Naturalizing of Anna Ferrers, and several other Persons named therein.
Naturalization of Mark le Pla and others.	14 Cha. 2. c. 33 Pr.	19 May 1662
An Act for the Naturalization of Mark Le Pla and others.
Bengeworth Bridge (Worcestershire) Repair Act 1662 (repealed)	14 Cha. 2. c. 34 Pr.	19 May 1662
An Act for the Repairing of Bengworth Bridge. (Repealed by the Statute Law (Repeals) Act 1998 (c. 43))
Rowland Okeover's Estate Act 1662	14 Cha. 2. c. 35 Pr.	19 May 1662
An Act to enable Rowland Okeover Esquire to sell certain Lands, in the County of Derby.
Edward Rivers' Estate Act 1662	14 Cha. 2. c. 36 Pr.	19 May 1662
An Act to enable Mistress Clemence Rivers and Mistress Rose Rivers to sell certain Lands and Houses, for Payment of the Debts of Edward Rivers Esquire, deceased, and Provision for his Younger Children.
Thomas Peck's Estate Act 1662	14 Cha. 2. c. 37 Pr.	19 May 1662
An Act enabling Thomas Peck Esquire to sell a Manor, and some Lands, in the County of Norffolke, for the Payment of his Debts, and other Uses.
Confirmation of agreements between Thomas Bushell and the miners of Rowpits (Somerset) for recovering their drowned and deserted works.	14 Cha. 2. c. 38 Pr.	19 May 1662
An Act for Confirmation of Agreements made between Thomas Bushell Esquire and the Miners of Row-pitts in Somersetshire, for recovering their drowned and deserted Works.
Francis Tindal's Estate Act 1662	14 Cha. 2. c. 39 Pr.	19 May 1662
An Act for the settling certain Lands belonging to Francis Tyndall Gentleman, upon Trustees, to be sold, for the Payment of Debts.
Confirmation of three Acts (12 Cha. 2 cc. 21, 31 and 34).	14 Cha. 2. c. 40 Pr.	19 May 1662
An Act for Confirmation of Three Acts, (Note: Royston (Hertfordshire and Cambridgeshire) Vicarage Act 1660 (12 Cha. 2. c. 21 Pr.)) (Note: Sir Edward Gostwicke Maintenance Act 1660 (12 Cha. 2. c. 31 Pr.)) (Note: Preston (Lancashire) Rectory Act 1660 (12 Cha. 2. c. 34 Pr.)) therein mentioned.

=== Sources ===
- Raithby, John, ed. (1963) [1819]. "14° Car. II.". Statutes of the Realm. Vol. 5: The Statutes of King Charles I and King Charles II (1625–1680). London: Dawsons. pp. 350–435 – via HathiTrust.
- Raithby, John, ed. (1819). Statutes of the Realm. Vol. 5: 1628-80 – via British History Online.
- Pickering, Danby, ed. (1763). "Anno decimo tertio & quarto Caroli II". The Statutes at Large. Vol. 8: From the Twelfth Year of King Charles II to the Last Year of King James II. Inclusive. Cambridge: Joseph Bentham. pp. 32–148 – via Internet Archive.
- Journals of the House of Commons. Vol. 8. London: His Majesty's Stationery Office. 1803.
- Journal of the House of Lords. Vol. 11: 1660-1666. London: His Majesty's Stationery Office. 1830. pp. 358–477 – via British History Online.
- Chronological Table of and Index to the Statutes. Vol. 1: To the End of the Session 59 Vict. Sess. 2 (1895) (13th ed.). London: Her Majesty's Stationery Office. 1896. pp. 69–70 – via Google Books.
- Chronological Table of the Statutes: Covering the Period from 1235 to the End of 1971. London: Her Majesty's Stationery Office. 1972. pp. 67–68. ISBN 978-0-11-840096-1 – via Google Books.
- "Acts of the English Parliament from 1662". legislation.gov.uk. The National Archives.
- "Chronological Tables of the Private and Personal Acts: Part 3 (1660–1680)". legislation.gov.uk. The National Archives.

== See also ==
- List of acts of the Parliament of England
