= Places of Religious Worship Act 1812 =

Act of the Parliament of the United Kingdom

Places of Religious Worship Act 1812 (Note: The citation of this act by this short title was authorised by section 1 of, and the first schedule to, the Short Titles Act 1896. Due to the repeal of those provisions it is now authorised by section 19(2) of the Interpretation Act 1978.)
- Act of Parliament
- Parliament of the United Kingdom
- Long title: An Act to repeal certain Acts, and amend other Acts relating to Religious Worship and Assemblies and Persons teaching or preaching therein.
- Citation: 52 Geo. 3. c. 155
- Territorial extent: United Kingdom

Dates
- Royal assent: 29 July 1812
- Commencement: 29 July 1812 (Note: The Acts of Parliament (Commencement) Act 1793.)
- Repealed: 16 June 1977
Other legislation
Amends	Toleration Act 1688
Repeals/revokes	Quakers Act 1662; Five Mile Act 1665; Conventicles Act 1670
Amended by	Protestant Dissenters Act 1852; Liberty of Religious Worship Act 1855; Promissory Oaths Act 1871; Statute Law Revision Act 1873; Summary Jurisdiction Act 1884; Statute Law Revision Act 1887; Statute Law Revision Act 1888; Public Authorities Protection Act 1893; Territorial Army and Militia Act 1921; Courts Act 1971
Repealed by	Statute Law (Repeals) Act 1977
Relates to	Places of Worship Registration Act 1855

Status: Repealed

Text of statute as originally enacted

The Places of Religious Worship Act 1812 (52 Geo. 3. c. 155) was an act of the Parliament of the United Kingdom. It updated the system of registration established by the Toleration Act 1688 (1 Will. & Mar. c. 18) for places of worship used by Protestant Dissenters except Quakers and set up a system of punishments for offenders against the act.

== Provisions ==
Section 1 of the act repealed the Quakers Act 1662 (14 Cha. 2. c. 1) (Note: This is the citation in The Statutes of the Realm.), the Five Mile Act 1665 (17 Cha. 2. c. 2) and the Conventicles Act 1670 (22 Cha. 2. c. 1).

== Subsequent developments ==
The whole act, "as relates to any oaths, or to any declaration other than the declaration set forth in the part of 19 Geo. 3. c. 44. not repealed by this Act" was repealed by section 1 of, and part II of schedule one to, the Promissory Oaths Act 1871 (34 & 35 Vict. c. 48), which came into force on 13 July 1871.

Section 18 of the act was repealed by section 2 of, and the schedule to, the Public Authorities Protection Act 1893 (56 & 57 Vict. c. 61), which came into force on 1 January 1894.

The whole act was repealed by section 1(1) of, and part V of schedule 1 to, the Statute Law (Repeals) Act 1977, which came into force on 16 June 1977.
