= Registration Service Act 1953 =

Act of the Parliament of the United Kingdom

Registration Service Act 1953 (Note: Section 24(1).)
- Act of Parliament
- Parliament of the United Kingdom
- Long title: An Act to consolidate certain enactments relating to the registration service in England and Wales with corrections and improvements made under the Consolidation of Enactments (Procedure) Act 1949.
- Citation: 1 & 2 Eliz. 2. c. 37
- Territorial extent: England and Wales (Note: Section 24(2).)

Dates
- Royal assent: 31 July 1953
- Commencement: 1 October 1953 (Note: Section 24(3).)

Other legislation
- Amends: See § Repealed enactments
- Repeals/revokes: See § Repealed enactments
- Amended by: London Government Act 1963; Minister for the Civil Service Order 1968; Local Government Act 1972; Statute Law (Repeals) Act 1974; Statute Law (Repeals) Act 1976; Statute Law (Repeals) Act 1977; Criminal Justice Act 1982; Statute Law (Repeals) Act 1986; Local Government (Wales) Act 1994; Statute Law (Repeals) Act 2004; Civil Partnership Act 2004 (Overseas Relationships and Consequential, etc. Amendments) Order 2005; Statistics and Registration Service Act 2007; Transfer of Functions (Registration) Order 2008; Welfare Reform Act 2012; Immigration Act 2016; Digital Economy Act 2017; Data Protection Act 2018; Data (Use and Access) Act 2025
- Relates to: Births and Deaths Registration Act 1953

Status: Amended

Text of statute as originally enacted

Text of the Registration Service Act 1953 as in force today (including any amendments) within the United Kingdom, from legislation.gov.uk.

The Registration Service Act 1953 (1 & 2 Eliz. 2. c. 37) is an act of the Parliament of the United Kingdom that consolidated enactments relating to the registration service in England and Wales.

== Provisions ==
=== Repealed enactments ===
Section 23(2) of the act repealed 14 enactments, listed in the second schedule to the act.

Citation	Short title	Extent of repeal
6 & 7 Will. 4. c. 85	Marriage Act 1836	The whole act.
6 & 7 Will. 4. c. 86	Births and Deaths Registration Act 1836	Sections two, three, five to nine, thirteen, fourteen, fifteen, twenty-nine, thirty-four and thirty-nine.
7 Will. 4. & 1 Vict. c. 22	Births and Deaths Registration Act 1837	Sections nine to twelve, fourteen, fifteen, eighteen, twenty and twenty-two.
3 & 4 Vict. c. 92	Non-parochial Registers Act 1840	Section three from the beginning to the word "and".
15 & 16 Vict. c. 25	General Register Office Act 1852	The whole act.
17 & 18 Vict. c. 94	Public Revenue and Consolidated Fund Charges Act 1854	In Schedule B, the words "salaries and contingencies of the General Register Office of Births, Deaths and Marriages, England—6 & 7 Will. 4. c. 86".
19 & 20 Vict. c. 119	Marriage and Registration Act 1856	Sections fifteen and sixteen.
37 & 38 Vict. c. 88	Births and Deaths Registration Act 1874	Sections twenty-one, twenty-four to twenty-seven, thirty-one, thirty-two and thirty-three.
19 & 20 Geo. 5. c. 17	Local Government Act 1929	Sections twenty-one to twenty-five, twenty-seven and twenty-eight; in section one hundred and thirty-one, in proviso (b) to subsection (2), the words from "or a scheme" to "Minister" where next occurring; in the Tenth Schedule, paragraphs 6 and 7 and sub-paragraph (a) of paragraph 24.
1 & 2 Geo. 6. c. 12	Population (Statistics) Act 1938	In section three, subsection (1) so far as it relates to England and Wales; and subsection (2).
9 & 10 Geo. 6. c. 26	Emergency Laws (Transitional Provisions) Act 1946	In the Second Schedule, the entry relating to the Births and Deaths Registration Act 1874.
12, 13 & 14 Geo. 6. c. 76	Marriage Act 1949	Subsection (6) of section fifty-seven; subsection (2) of section fifty-eight from "so" onwards; in section fifty-nine the words from "in accordance with section" onwards; subsection (4) of section sixty-five; and in paragraph (a) of section seventy-four the words "superintendent registrars, registrars and".
14 Geo. 6. c. 26	Adoption Act 1950	Subsection (5) of section seventeen.
1 & 2 Eliz. 2. c. 20	Births and Deaths Registration Act 1953	Subsection (3) of section forty-three.

== Subsequent developments ==
The act has been amended on several occasions. The Statistics and Registration Service Act 2007 restructured the role of the Registrar General and removed certain administrative provisions. The Immigration Act 2016 removed provisions relating to general fees. The Digital Economy Act 2017 inserted new provisions enabling disclosure of registration information to public authorities. The Data Protection Act 2018 and the Data (Use and Access) Act 2025 made further amendments.

Section 23(2) of, and schedule 2 to, the act were repealed by section 1 of, and part XI of the schedule to, the Statute Law (Repeals) Act 1974, which came into force on 27 June 1974.

Section 17 of the act was repealed by section 1(1) of, and group 2 of part VII of schedule 1 to, the Statute Law (Repeals) Act 1986, which came into force on 2 May 1986.
