= R v Registrar General, ex parte Segerdal =

British Scientology court case

R v Registrar General ex parte Segerdal and another
- Court: Court of Appeal of England and Wales
- Decided: 7 July 1970
- Citation: [1970] 2 QB 697, [1970] 3 All ER 886

Court membership
- Judges sitting: Lord Denning MR, Winn LJ, Buckley LJ

R v Registrar General ex parte Segerdal and another was a court case heard by the Court of Appeal of England and Wales, which was instrumental in determining whether the Church of Scientology was to be considered a bona fide religion in England and Wales, and by extension what defines a religion in English law. The case, heard in 1969–70, focused on the question of whether a chapel at the Scientologists' UK headquarters should be registered as a meeting place for religious worship under an 1855 law. The Church's initial application was refused and it appealed the case to the courts, arguing that Scientology was a genuine religion and that it used the chapel for religious purposes. In dismissing the appeal, the Court of Appeal found that Scientology's practices "did not reveal any form whatever of worship". Ten years later, the Segerdal ruling was drawn upon to define a religion for the purposes of English common law as requiring "faith in a god and worship of that god". The Segerdal ruling was later overturned by the Supreme Court in 2013 who redefined the term "religion" in a modern context and ruled that Scientology is to be recognised as a religion in the UK.

== Facts ==
The case arose from a bid in 1967 by the Church of Scientology of California to have its "chapel" at Saint Hill Manor, East Grinstead registered as a place of worship under the Places of Worship Registration Act 1855. Such a status would convey tax benefits and other advantages. The move followed the worldwide publicity that accompanied the 1965 publication of the Anderson Report, a highly condemnatory report into the practices and effects of Scientology in Victoria, Australia. As Sir John Foster later noted in a British official report on Scientology (the Foster Report), prior to the publication of the Anderson Report little serious effort was made to present Scientology as a religion. Following the report, however, the leadership of the Church of Scientology made a concerted effort to present Scientology as having a religious character. Scientology was now described as "an applied 'religious' philosophy, processing as a 'religious' technology, auditors as 'Scientology Ministers', auditing as 'Confessionals', and so on." In an HCO Executive Letter of 12 March 1966 the founder of Scientology, L. Ron Hubbard, informed Scientologists that a new corporate structure was being set up using the Church of Scientology of California as a vehicle. Scientology "auditors" would be presented as ministers of religion, as "ministers have in many places special privileges including tax and housing allowances" and "Parliaments don't attack religions".

At the start of 1967 the church and its acting chaplain, Michael Segerdal, submitted a request to the Registrar General for the chapel to be registered under the 1855 Act. The Registrar General made enquiries following the application and was sent booklets titled Ceremonies of the Founding Church of Scientology and Scientology and the Bible. He turned down the application as he did not believe that Scientology qualified as a religion.

== Judgment ==
=== Queen's Bench hearing ===
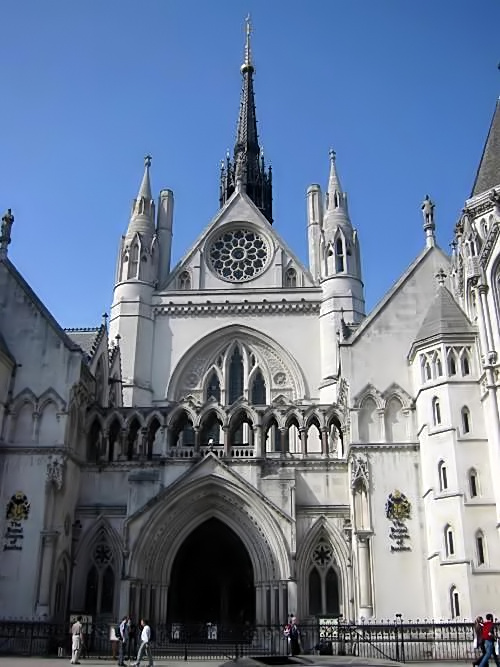
The Royal Courts of Justice, where the case was heard

In response, Segerdal and the Church brought an application for a writ of mandamus – essentially a request to overrule the Registrar General – to the Queen's Bench Division of the High Court of Justice in London. The case was heard by a panel of three judges: Lord Parker, the Lord Chief Justice, Mr Justice Ashworth and Mr Justice Cantley. In its ruling, issued on 14 November 1969, the court dismissed the application with costs awarded against the plaintiffs. Justice Ashworth commented: "While Scientology may be wholly admirable, I find it difficult to reach the conclusion that it is a religion."

The plaintiffs' contention that Scientology was a bona fide religion was supported by the two booklets on Scientology's "creeds". Scientology and the Bible contended that "Scientology is a religion in the oldest sense of the word, a study of wisdom. Scientology is a study of man as a spirit, in his relationship to life and the physical universe. It is non-denominational. By that is meant that Scientology is open to people from all religious beliefs and in no way tries to persuade a person from his religion, but assists him to better understanding as a spiritual being." Justice Ashworth commented that this formulation did not seem to support at all the assertion that Scientology was a religion; rather, it came across more as "a meeting point for persons of all religious beliefs, through which they might better appreciate their spiritual character."

The central issue in the case was whether the chapel was "a place of meeting for religious worship", as required by the 1855 Act. In support of the application, Segerdal described in an affidavit how the chapel was used. He told the court that "Sunday services" were held there at which the chaplain addressed a congregation and delivered a sermon on aspects of Scientology, possibly accompanied by a taped lecture from L. Ron Hubbard. It was followed by a short period for quiet contemplation or prayer and concluded with announcements of things happening in the forthcoming week. Segerdal also stated that other religious activities were conducted there such as christening or naming ceremonies, funeral services and wedding services.

The court ruled that for worship to take place, there had to be "both a worshipper and an object of worship." For it to be religious worship, it had to be associated with a bona fide religion. This was a problem for Scientology, as its religious status was controversial and unclear. The court found that the evidence did not support Scientology's claims of religious status, nor did its practices amount to religious worship. The services described by Segerdal were better described as services of instruction rather than worship.

=== Court of Appeal ===
The case was appealed to the Court of Appeal, where it was heard by Lord Denning, the Master of the Rolls, Lord Justice Winn and Lord Justice Buckley. Counsel for the Scientologists argued that the Registrar General was obliged to accept certifications of a place's use for religious worship, but the court rejected this proposition. Lord Denning found that the Registrar General was obliged to determine whether a place was truly being used for religious worship, as it would lead to abuses if he merely "rubber-stamped" such applications.

The court debated what "religious worship" meant but identified the phrase "place of meeting for religious worship" in the 1855 Act as being the key issue. To Lord Denning's mind, this meant "a place of which the principal use was as a place where people came together as a congregation to do reverence" to a deity, whether it was the Christian God or some other. The judges agreed that Scientology's practices "did not reveal any form whatever of worship. [Scientologists] did not humble themselves in reverence or recognition of the dominant power and control of any entity or being outside their own bodies and life." As Lord Denning put it, "There is considerable stress on the spirit of Man, and adherents of this religion or philosophy believe that a man's spirit is everlasting and moves from one human frame to another. But it is still, as far as I can see, the spirit of Man and not God." The court found that there was no evidence of religious worship taking place in the chapel and dismissed the appeal. Permission to appeal to the House of Lords was refused.

== Significance ==
The Segerdal case has continued to have relevance for many years since it was heard in 1969–70. In 1974, the Immigration Appeal Tribunal relied upon Segerdal in ruling that Scientologists could not take advantage of the privileges given in immigration law to ministers of religion.

The Segerdal ruling was heavily relied upon in 1980 to put forward a definition of religion in the case Re South Place Ethical Society. The Society, which proclaimed itself to be concerned with "the study and dissemination of ethical principles and the cultivation of a rational religious sentiment", had applied for charitable status for the purpose of advancement of religion. Justice Dillon drew on the Segerdal case's comments on what constituted a religion and observed: "Religion, as I see it, is concerned with man's relations with God, and ethics are concerned with man's relations with man. The two are not the same, and are not made the same by sincere inquiry into the question: what is God?" Dillon defined religion as requiring "faith in a god and worship of that god".

Dillon's definition and the Segerdal findings were of key importance in 1999 when the Charity Commission decided to reject the Church of Scientology's application for charitable status. The Commission held that the Church was not established for the advancement of religion because although "it is accepted that Scientology believes in a supreme being", the "core practices of Scientology, being auditing and training, do not constitute worship as they do not display the essential characteristic of reverence or veneration for a supreme being."

The Segerdal definition of "a place of religious worship" still applies to registrations of such places. The court found that in order to be registered, the principal use of the place would have to be religious, regardless of how heavily (or little) it was used for that purpose. As Julian Rivers points out, the law "assumes that religious and non-religious uses are easy to disentangle", which may not always be the case.

A thirty-year retrospective on Segerdal can be found in Chapter 5 of the first report of the House of Lords Select Committee on Religious Offences in England and Wales.

== Supreme Court decision 2013 ==
On 11 December 2013, the Supreme Court in the UK overruled Segerdal in R (on the application of Hodkin and another) v Registrar General of Births, Deaths and Marriages.

In the Supreme Court's judgement, it established a new legal definition for religion as "a spiritual or non-secular belief system, held by a group of adherents, which claims to explain mankind’s place in the universe and relationship with the infinite, and to teach its adherents how they are to live their lives in conformity with the spiritual understanding associated with the belief system." Lord Toulson concluded that Scientology would meet that definition of a religion in the UK and subsequently ordered the Registrar General to recognize the Chapel at the Church of Scientology in London as a place of worship and as a place for the solemnisation of marriages under section 41(1) of the Marriage Act.

== See also ==
- British administrative law
- United Kingdom constitutional law
