= Civil Partnerships, Marriages and Deaths (Registration etc) Act 2019 =

Act of Parliament of the United Kingdom

Civil Partnerships, Marriages and Deaths (Registration etc) Act 2019 (Note: Section 6(4).)
- Act of Parliament
- Parliament of the United Kingdom
- Long title: An Act to make provision about the registration of marriage; to make provision for the extension of civil partnerships to couples not of the same sex; to make provision for a report on the registration of pregnancy loss; to make provision about the investigation of still-births; and for connected purposes.
- Citation: 2019 c. 12
- Introduced by: Tim Loughton (Commons); Baroness Hodgson of Abinger (Lords)
- Territorial extent: England & Wales; Scotland (sections 5 and 6); Northern Ireland (sections 5 and 6); (Note: Section 6(1)–(2).)

Dates
- Royal assent: 26 March 2019
- Commencement: 26 May 2019 (Note: Section 6(3).)
Other legislation
Relates to	Marriage of British Subjects (Facilities) Act 1915; Marriage of British Subjects (Facilities) Act 1916; Marriage Act 1949; Births and Deaths Registration Act 1953; Civil Partnership Act 2004; Coroners and Justice Act 2009; Marriage (Same Sex Couples) Act 2013

Status: Current legislation

History of passage through Parliament

Text of statute as originally enacted

Revised text of statute as amended

The Civil Partnerships, Marriages and Deaths (Registration etc) Act 2019 (c. 12) is an act of the Parliament of the United Kingdom which changes civil partnerships to include heterosexual couples, the way in which stillbirths are recorded and how a Coroner's inquest into stillbirths are conducted.

== Background ==
The act was created in response to the unanimous judgement of the Supreme Court of the United Kingdom in the case R (on the application of Steinfeld and Keidan) v Secretary of State for International Development in 2018 that ruled after the Marriage (Same Sex Couples) Act 2013, the Government was not justified in spending years reviewing the inequality between heterosexual and homosexual couples in relation to civil partnerships. The court made a declaration of incompatibility based on Article 14 (prohibition on discrimination) and Article 8 (right to respect for private life) of the European Convention on Human Rights (ECHR) on the basis that the Civil Partnership Act 2004 discriminates against heterosexual couples by precluding them from entering into civil partnerships.

Before the act, the Births and Deaths Registration Act 1953 (1 & 2 Eliz. 2. c. 20) required all still-births (where a baby is still-born after 24 weeks gestation) to be registered by a registrar. Parents of babies who were still-born receive a medical certificate certifying the still-birth and, upon registration, could register the baby's name and receive a certificate of registration of still-birth. When a pregnancy ended before 24 weeks gestation, however, there was no formal process for parents to legally register the loss.

== Provisions ==
The act has the following effects:

- to allow opposite sex couples to enter a civil partnership to reform how marriages are registered, and register the names of the mother of each party in a marriage or civil partnership
- to require the Secretary of State to report on whether the law should be changed to allow the registration of pregnancy losses which cannot be registered as still-births under the Births and Deaths Registration Act 1953
- to report on giving coroners powers to investigate stillborn deaths

== See also ==
- Civil Partnership and Certain Rights and Obligations of Cohabitants Act 2010
- Civil partnership in the United Kingdom
