= Marriage Act 1836 =

Act of the Parliament of the United Kingdom

Marriage Act 1836 (Note: The citation of this act by this short title was authorised by section 1 of, and the first schedule to, the Short Titles Act 1896. Due to the repeal of those provisions it is now authorised by section 19(2) of the Interpretation Act 1978.)
- Act of Parliament
- Parliament of the United Kingdom
- Long title: An Act for Marriages in England.
- Citation: 6 & 7 Will. 4. c. 85
- Territorial extent: England and Wales (Note: Section 45.)

Dates
- Royal assent: 17 August 1836
- Commencement: 1 January 1837 (Note: Section 1.)
- Repealed: 1 October 1953
Other legislation
Amended by	Births and Deaths Registration Act 1837; Statute Law Revision Act 1874; Marriage Act 1949
Repealed by	Registration Service Act 1953
Relates to	Clandestine Marriages Act 1753; Places of Worship Registration Act 1855

Status: Repealed

Text of statute as originally enacted

A bill for marriages in England (1836)

The Marriage Act 1836 (6 & 7 Will. 4. c. 85), also known as the Act for Marriages in England 1836 or the Broomstick Marriage Act, was an act of the Parliament of the United Kingdom that legalised civil marriage in what is now England and Wales from 30 June 1837.

Since the Clandestine Marriages Act 1753 (26 Geo. 2. c. 33), the only legally recognised marriages in England and Wales had been those performed by the Church of England, Jews and Quakers. This meant that Roman Catholics and members of other Christian congregations, as well as atheists, Muslims, Hindus and members of any other religious body, had to be married according to (the Anglican) rites and ceremonies which they did not support, and by a priest who they believed had no authority. If they did not do so, they had no legal rights as married people. Roman Catholic priests often recommended that their parishioners be married in the Roman Church but then have their marriage legalised in an Anglican parish church. When asked why he recommended this, one priest "declared gloomily that almost every day the wife of an Irish labourer was deserted by her husband and could get no redress".

The act allowed marriages to be legally registered in buildings belonging to other religious groups. Religious groups could apply for registration for their buildings with the Registrar General and subsequently could conduct weddings if a Registrar and two witnesses were present.

One of the most vocal opponents of the bill was Henry Phillpotts, Bishop of Exeter. The Times of 13 October 1836 reports that he denounced the bill as being "a disgrace to British legislation. [It] is pretended to be called for to prevent clandestine marriages, but I think it will greatly facilitate such proceedings. Not solemnised by the church of England, may be celebrated without entering into a consecrated building, may be contracted by anybody, and will be equally valid, whether it takes place in the house of God, or in the house of a registering clerk, one of the lowest functionaries of the state. The parties may take one another for better and for worse, without calling God to witness their plighted troth. No blessing sought; no solemn vows of mutual fidelity; no religious solemnity whatever ..."

== Subsequent developments ==
The whole act, except sections 3 and 17 and 45, was repealed by section 79(1) of, and part I of schedule 5 to, the Marriage Act 1949 (12, 13 & 14 Geo. 6. c. 76), which came into force on 1 January 1950.

The whole act was repealed by section 23(2) of, and schedule 2 to, Registration Service Act 1953 (1 & 2 Eliz. 2. c. 37), which came into force on 1 October 1953.

== Bibliography ==
- Richard Matthews. An Act for Marriages in England, 6 & 7 William IV., c. 85. Saunders and Benning. London. 1836. Google Books
- John Mounteney Lely. "The Marriage Act, 1836". The Statutes of Practical Utility. (Chitty's Statutes). Fifth Edition. Sweet and Maxwell. Stevens and Sons. London. 1895. Volume 7. Title "Marriage". Pages 23 to 36.
