= Toleration Act 1688 =

Act of the Parliament of England, giving freedom of worship to some nonconformists

Toleration Act 1688 (Note: The citation of this act by this short title was authorised by section 5 of, and the second schedule to, the Statute Law Revision Act 1948. Due to the repeal of those provisions, it is now authorised by section 19(2) of the Interpretation Act 1978.) (Note: Before the Acts of Parliament (Commencement) Act 1793, acts were held to have taken effect at the start of the parliamentary session in which they received royal assent. The Convention Parliament was deemed to have formally begun its session on 13 February 1688. Under Old Style dates, the year changed on 25 March, and hence all the acts of that parliament are dated 1688, even though that same date would now be written as 13 February 1689 in New Style dates.)
- Act of Parliament
- Parliament of England
- Long title: An Act for Exempting their Majestyes Protestant Subjects dissenting from the Church of England from the Penalties of certaine Lawes. (Note: These words are printed against this act in the second column of the second schedule to the Statute Law Revision Act 1948, which is headed "Title".)
- Citation: 1 Will. & Mar. c. 18 (Note: This is the citation in The Statutes of the Realm.); 1 Will. & Mar. Sess. 1. c. 18 (Note: This is the citation in The Statutes at Large.)
- Territorial extent: England and Wales

Dates
- Royal assent: 24 May 1689
- Commencement: 13 February 1689 (Note: Start of session.)
- Repealed: 30 July 1948
Other legislation
Amended by	Nonconformist Relief Act 1779; Places of Religious Worship Act 1812; Doctrine of the Trinity Act 1813; Protestant Dissenters Act 1852; Liberty of Religious Worship Act 1855; Statute Law Revision Act 1863
Repealed by	Promissory Oaths Act 1871; Statute Law Revision Act 1888; Statute Law Revision Act 1948; Statute Law (Repeals) Act 1969
Relates to	Conventicle Act 1664; Five Mile Act 1665; Places of Worship Registration Act 1855

Status: Repealed

Text of statute as originally enacted

The Toleration Act 1688 (1 Will. & Mar. c. 18), also referred to as the Act of Toleration or the Toleration Act 1689, was an act of the Parliament of England. Passed in the aftermath of the Glorious Revolution, it was authored by Daniel Finch, 2nd Earl of Nottingham, and received royal assent on 24 May 1689.

The act allowed for freedom of worship to nonconformists who had pledged to the oaths of Allegiance and Supremacy and rejected transubstantiation, i.e., to Protestants who dissented from the Church of England such as Baptists, Congregationalists or English Presbyterians, but not to Roman Catholics. Nonconformists were allowed their own places of worship and their own schoolteachers, so long as they accepted certain oaths of allegiance.

The act intentionally did not apply to Roman Catholics, Jews, nontrinitarians, and atheists. Further, it continued the existing social and political disabilities for dissenters, including their exclusion from holding political offices and also from the universities. Dissenters were required to register their meeting houses and were forbidden from meeting in private homes. Any preachers who dissented had to be licensed.

Between 1772 and 1774, Edward Pickard gathered together dissenting ministers, to campaign for the terms of the act for dissenting clergy to be modified. Under his leadership, Parliament twice considered bills to modify the law, but both were unsuccessful and it was not until Pickard and many others had ended their efforts that a new attempt was made in 1779. The act was amended in 1779 by the Nonconformist Relief Act 1779 (19 Geo. 3. c. 44), which substituted belief in the Christians' Scriptures for belief in the Thirty-Nine Articles of the Anglican churches, but some penalties on holding property remained. Penalties against Unitarians were finally removed in the Doctrine of the Trinity Act 1813 (53 Geo. 3. c. 160).

== Background ==
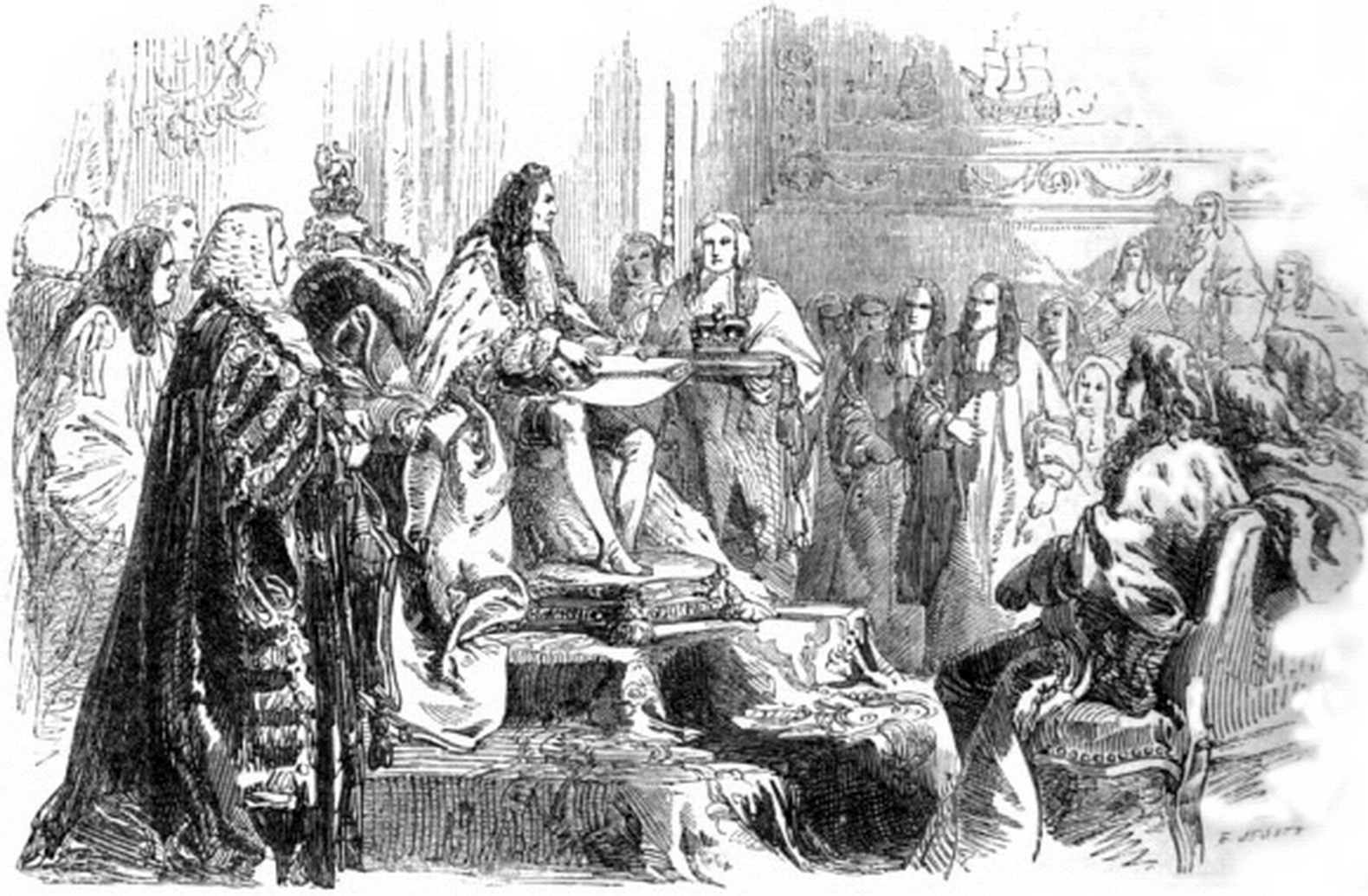
William III giving his royal assent to the Toleration Act.

During both the English Commonwealth and the reign of Charles II, nonconforming dissenters including Roman Catholics, were subject to religious persecution and precluded from holding official office. Following the restoration of Charles II, Anglican leaders debated in correspondence and public sermon the extent to which the Anglican church should allow doctrinal latitude; this debate was related to the corresponding debate on broadening church membership and tolerating dissenters. The succession of the Roman Catholic James II was challenged on religious grounds prior to his accession in what became known as the Exclusion Crisis and after he took the crown in 1686 in the Monmouth Rebellion. However, the Tory leadership of the Anglican church initially supported his right to rule based on the theology of active obedience to the monarch. James II sought a repeal of the Test Acts, which imposed various civil disabilities on both Catholics and Protestant non-conformists, to broaden his political support and allow for the appointment of Roman Catholics to civilian and military roles. Failing to secure parliamentary support, James II's attempt to dispense with the Test Acts through the 1687 and 1688 Declarations of Indulgence helped spark the constitutional crises that culminated in the Glorious Revolution and the accession of William and Mary, who became joint sovereigns. A series of acts of parliament assured a new constitutional settlement of this situation; these include the Bill of Rights 1689 (1 Will. & Mar. Sess. 2. c. 2), the Crown and Parliament Recognition Act 1689 (2 Will. & Mar. c. 1), the Mutiny Act 1689, the Toleration Act 1688, and later the Act of Settlement 1701 (12 & 13 Will. 3. c. 2) and the Act of Union 1707 (6 Ann. c. 11).

The historian Kenneth Pearl sees the Act of Toleration as "in many ways a compromise bill. To get nonconformists' (Protestants who were not members of the Church of England) support in the crucial months of 1688". Both the Whig and Tory parties that had rallied around William and Mary had promised nonconformists that such an act would be enacted if the revolution succeeded. James II had himself issued a declaration of indulgence that suspended the laws against religious nonconformity, but nonconformists believed James II's efforts to undermine their civil liberties and circumvent parliament placed the religious liberties provided via the Declarations of Indulgence at risk.

Catholics and Unitarians were not hunted down after the act was passed but they still had no right to assemble and pray. As there still remained a Test Act, non-Anglicans (including all Protestant non-Conformists, Jews, Catholics, and Unitarians) could not sit in Parliament even following the passage of the act. The Scottish Episcopalians Act 1711 (10 Ann. c. 10), passed following the union between Scotland and England, granted limited toleration, specifically the right to worship for Scottish Episcopalians who prayed for the monarch and used the English Book of Common Prayer. Unitarians were only granted toleration after the Doctrine of the Trinity Act 1813 (53 Geo. 3. c. 160); prior to that time, denying the Trinity was a capital offence in Scotland.

The act remained in force until the nineteenth century.

== Influences ==
Historians (such as John J. Patrick) see John Locke's A Letter Concerning Toleration advocating religious toleration (written in 1685 and published in 1689) as "the philosophical foundation for the English Act of Toleration of 1689". While Locke had advocated coexistence between the Church of England (the established church) and dissenting Protestant denominations (including Congregationalists, Baptists, Presbyterians, and Quakers) he had excluded Catholics from toleration – the same policy that the Act of Toleration enacted.

== Implementation in the overseas colonies ==
The terms of the Act of Toleration within the English colonies in America were applied either by charter or by acts by the royal governors. The ideas of toleration as advocated by Locke (which excluded Roman Catholics) became accepted through most of the colonies, even in the Congregational strongholds within New England which had previously punished or excluded dissenters. The colonies of Pennsylvania, Rhode Island, Delaware, and New Jersey went further than the Act of Toleration by outlawing the establishment of any church and allowing a greater religious diversity. Within the colonies in the year 1700 Roman Catholics were allowed to practice their religion freely only in Rhode Island.

== Provisions ==
=== Section 5 ===
This section, from "bee it" to "aforesaid that" was repealed by section 1 of, and Part I of the schedule to, the Statute Law Revision Act 1888 (51 & 52 Vict. c. 3).

In this section, the words "as aforesaid" were repealed by section 1 of, and schedule 1 to, the Statute Law Revision Act 1948 (11 & 12 Geo. 6. c. 62).

=== Section 8 ===
This section, from "bee it" to "aforesaid that" was repealed by section 1 of, and Part I of the schedule to, the Statute Law Revision Act 1888.

=== Section 15 ===
This section, from "bee it" to "aforesaid" was repealed by section 1 of, and Part I of the schedule to, the Statute Law Revision Act 1888.

In this section, the words "after the tenth day of June" were repealed by section 1 of, and schedule 1 to, the Statute Law Revision Act 1948.

=== Section 18 ===
Section 6 of the Ecclesiastical Courts Jurisdiction Act 1860 (23 & 24 Vict. c. 32) provided that nothing contained thereinbefore in that act was to be taken to repeal or alter section 18 of the Toleration Act 1688.

== Subsequent developments ==
Toleration of worship was later extended to Protestants who did not believe in Trinitarian doctrine in the Unitarians Relief Act 1813 (53 Geo. 3. c. 160). Catholics were allowed to worship under strict conditions through the Roman Catholic Relief Act 1791 (31 Geo. 3. c. 32). As time went on, oaths and tests that barred non-conformists and Roman Catholics from holding public offices, keeping schools, and owning land were rescinded by laws such as Roman Catholic Relief Act 1778 (18 Geo. 3. c. 60), the Roman Catholic Charities Act 1832 (2 & 3 Will. 4. c. 115), the Test Abolition Act 1867 (30 & 31 Vict. c. 62), the Promissory Oaths Act 1868 (31 & 32 Vict. c. 72), the Promissory Oaths Act 1871 (34 & 35 Vict. c. 48) and the Oaths Act 1978. The Roman Catholic Relief Act 1829 allowed followers of that religion to be elected to Parliament and to hold most offices under the Crown, while the Jews Relief Act 1858 (21 & 22 Vict. c. 49) had a similar effect for adherents of Judaism. The Religious Disabilities Act 1846 (9 & 10 Vict. c. 59) ended restrictions on Roman Catholics for education, charities, and owning property, although Oxford, Cambridge, and Durham universities were allowed to continue to exclude Roman Catholics until Universities Tests Act 1871 (34 & 35 Vict. c. 26) took effect. By the passage of the Places of Worship Registration Act 1855 (18 & 19 Vict. c. 81), an optional system of registration for non-Anglican places of worship was passed which gave certain legal and fiscal advantages for those that registered, and "alternative religion was not only lawful, but was often facilitated by the law."

Section 2 of the act was repealed by section 1 of, and the schedule to, the Statute Law Revision Act 1867 (30 & 31 Vict. c. 59), which came into force on 15 July 1867.

The whole act, except section 5 and so much of section 8 as specified the service and offices from which certain persons were exempt and section 15, was repealed by section 1 of, and part II of schedule one to, the Promissory Oaths Act 1871 (34 & 35 Vict. c. 48), which came into force on 13 July 1871.

The whole act was repealed by section 1 of, and part II of the schedule to, the Statute Law (Repeals) Act 1969, which came into force on 1 January 1970.

== See also ==
- Baptist Confession of Faith of 1689 – Particular Baptist creedal statement of 1689
- Catholic Emancipation – Reduction in anti-Catholicism laws
- Declaration of Indulgence (1672) – Decree by King Charles II of England granting liberty to all Christians
- Declaration of Indulgence (1687) – Pair of proclamations made by James II
- Freedom of religion – Human right to practice, or not, a religion without conflict from governing powers
- Maryland Toleration Act – 1649 religious tolerance act in the Maryland Colony
- Puritan's Pit – Pit in Devon, England
- Religion in the United Kingdom
- Religious toleration – Allowing or permitting a religion of which one disapproves
