= Conventicles Act 1670 =

Act of the Parliament of England

- Act of Parliament
- Parliament of England
- Long title: An Act to prevent and suppress Seditious Conventicles.
- Citation: 22 Cha. 2. c. 1
- Territorial extent: England and Wales

Dates
- Royal assent: 11 April 1670
- Commencement: 11 May 1670 (Note: Start of session.)
- Repealed: 29 July 1812
Other legislation
Repealed by	Places of Religious Worship Act 1812

Status: Repealed

Text of statute as originally enacted

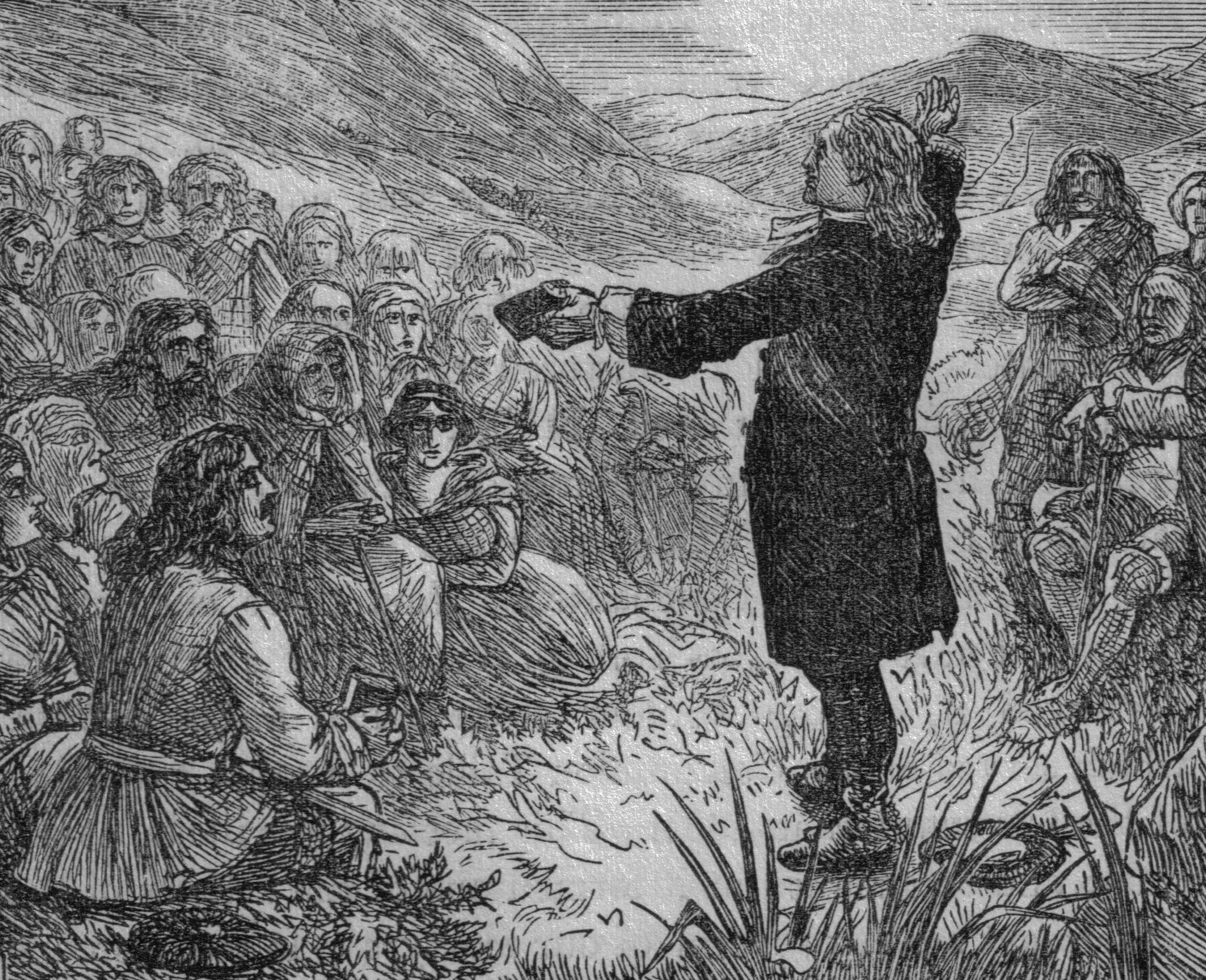
A Covenanters Conventicle.

The Conventicles Act 1670 (22 Cha. 2. c. 1) was an act of the Parliament of England with the long title "An Act to prevent and suppress Seditious Conventicles".

The act imposed a fine on any person who attended a conventicle (any religious assembly other than the Church of England) of five shillings for the first offence and ten shillings for a second offence. Any preacher or person who allowed their house to be used as a meeting house for such an assembly could be fined 20 shillings and 40 shillings for a second offence.

== Subsequent developments ==
The whole act was repealed by section 1 of the Places of Religious Worship Act 1812 (52 Geo. 3. c. 155), which came into force on 29 July 1812.

== See also ==
- Conventicle Act 1664

== Bibliography ==
- Lawson, Rev. R. (1885). Maybole Past and Present. J. & R. Parlane. p. 49.
- Noorthouck, John (1773). "Book 1, Chapter 15: From the Fire to the death of Charles II". A New History of London: Including Westminster and Southwark. pp. 230–255.
- Raithby, John, ed. (1819). Charles II, 1670: An Act to prevent and suppress Seditious Conventicles. Statutes of the Realm (1628–80). Vol. 5. pp. 648–651.
