= Quakers Act 1662 =

Act of the Parliament of England

- Act of Parliament
- Parliament of England
- Long title: An Act for preventing the Mischiefs and Dangers that may arise, by certain Persons called Quakers, and others, refusing to take lawful Oaths.
- Citation: 14 Cha. 2. c. 1 (Note: This is the citation in The Statutes of the Realm.); 13 & 14 Cha. 2. c. 1 (Note: This is the citation in The Statutes at Large.)
- Territorial extent: England and Wales

Dates
- Royal assent: 2 May 1662
- Commencement: 24 March 1661 (Note: Section 1.)
- Repealed: 29 July 1812
Other legislation
Repealed by	Places of Religious Worship Act 1812

Status: Repealed

Text of statute as originally enacted

The Quaker Act 1662 (14 Cha. 2. c. 1) was an act of the Parliament of England which required subjects to swear an oath of allegiance to the king, which Quakers did not do out of religious conviction. It set out specific penalties for first (a fine of up to £5, or three months' imprisonment with hard labour), second (a fine of up to £10, or six months imprisonment with hard labour), and third (transportation) offence. It also allowed that should the defendant subsequently agree to swear oaths and not attend unlawful assemblies (as defined by the Act) then all penalties would be cancelled.

== Subsequent developments ==
The whole act was repealed by section 1 of the Places of Religious Worship Act 1812 (52 Geo. 3. c. 155), which came into force on 29 July 1812.
