= Births and Deaths Registration Act 1874 =

Act of the Parliament of the United Kingdom

Births and Deaths Registration Act 1874 (Note: Section 53.)
- Act of Parliament
- Parliament of the United Kingdom
- Long title: An Act to amend the Law relating to the Registration of Births and Deaths in England, and to consolidate the Law respecting the Registration of Births and Deaths at Sea.
- Citation: 37 & 38 Vict. c. 88
- Territorial extent: England and Wales (Note: Section 51.)

Dates
- Royal assent: 7 August 1874
- Commencement: 1 January 1875 (Note: Section 50.)

Other legislation
- Amends: See § Repealed enactments
- Amended by: Elementary Education Act 1876; Statute Law Revision Act 1883; Statute Law Revision (No. 2) Act 1893; Forgery Act 1913; Births and Deaths Registration Act 1926; Local Government Act 1929; Marriage Act 1949; Births and Deaths Registration Act 1953; Registration Service Act 1953; Registration of Births, Deaths and Marriages (Special Provisions) Act 1957; National Health Service Reorganisation Act 1973; Statute Law (Repeals) Act 1977; Statute Law (Repeals) Act 1993

Status: Amended

Text of statute as originally enacted

Revised text of statute as amended

Text of the Births and Deaths Registration Act 1874 as in force today (including any amendments) within the United Kingdom, from legislation.gov.uk.

The Births and Deaths Registration Act 1874 (37 & 38 Vict. c. 88) is an act of the Parliament of the United Kingdom that consolidated enactments relating to the registration of births and deaths in England and Wales and at sea.

The act closed loopholes within the Births and Deaths Registration Act 1836 (6 & 7 Will. 4. c. 86) and provided that it was the responsibility of parents to register births.

As of 2026 parts of the act remains in force in England and Wales, although the majority of the act was repealed by the Births and Deaths Registration Act 1953 (1 & 2 Eliz. 2. c. 20) and the Registration Service Act 1953 (1 & 2 Eliz. 2. c. 23).

== Provisions ==
=== Repealed enactments ===
Section 54 of the act repealed 7 enactments, listed in the fifth schedule to the act.

Citation	Short title	Description	Extent of repeal
6 & 7 Will. 4. c. 86	Births and Deaths Registration Act 1836	An Act for registering births, deaths, and marriages in England.	Sections one, four, twelve, and sixteen, section eighteen from “as herein-” after provided at a reasonable price “to the end of the section, sections nineteen to twenty-eight, section thirty-six, section thirty-nine from ” ac-“cording to the pro-” visions of" to the end of the section, so much of sections forty - one, forty-two, and forty-four as relates to registrars or registers of births and deaths, sections forty-five and fifty, and schedules (E.), (P.), and (G)
7 Will. 4. & 1 Vict. c. 22	Births and Deaths Registration Act 1837	An Act to explain and amend two Acts passed in the last session of Parliament, for-marriages, and for registering births, deaths, and marriages in England.	Sections two, four, six, thirteen, sixteen, twenty-one, twenty-five, and thirty-one.
17 & 18 Vict. c. 80	Registration of Births, Deaths, and Marriages (Scotland) Act 1854	An Act to provide for the better registration of births, deaths, and marriages in Scotland.	Sections thirty and forty-three.
17 & 18 Vict. c. 104	Merchant Shipping Act 1854	The Merchant Shipping Act, 1854.	Sections two hundred and seventy-three and two hundred and eighty-two, so far as they relate to the entry of any birth or death.
18 & 19 Vict. c. 119.	Passengers Act 1855	Passengers Act, 1855	Section sixteen from “and ” the said master shall “note in writing ” down to “An Act for registering ”births, deaths, and marriages in England,“and section one hundred from ” such emigration or customs officer " to the end of the section.
21 & 22 Vict. c. 25.	Births and Deaths Registration Act 1858	An Act to amend the Act concerning non-parochial registers, and the Acts for marriages, and for registering births, deaths, and marriages in England, and concerning vaccination.	The whole Act, except sections one to four.
26 & 27 Vict. c 11	Registration of Births and Deaths (Ireland) Act 1863	An Act for the registration of births and deaths in Ireland.	Sections thirty-nine and forty.

== Subsequent developments ==
Sections 21, 24-27 and 31-33 of the act were repealed by section 23(2) of, and schedule 2 to, Registration Service Act 1953 (1 & 2 Eliz. 2. c. 37), which came into force on 1 October 1953.

Section 45 of the act was repealed by section 1(1) of, and group 1 of part I of schedule 1 to, the Statute Law (Repeals) Act 1993, which came into force on 5 November 1993.
