= Protestant Dissenters Act 1852 =

Act of the Parliament of the United Kingdom

- Act of Parliament
- Parliament of the United Kingdom
- Long title: An Act to amend the Law relating to the certifying and registering Places of Religious Worship of Protestant Dissenters.
- Citation: 15 & 16 Vict. c. 36
- Territorial extent: England and Wales (Note: Section 1.)

Dates
- Royal assent: 30 June 1852
- Commencement: 30 June 1852 (Note: The Acts of Parliament (Commencement) Act 1793.)
- Repealed: 30 July 1855
Other legislation
Amends	Places of Religious Worship Act 1812; Toleration Act 1688
Repealed by	Places of Worship Registration Act 1855

Status: Repealed

Text of statute as originally enacted

The Protestant Dissenters Act 1852 (15 & 16 Vict. c. 36) was an act of the Parliament of the United Kingdom regarding places of worship for Protestant Dissenters. It replaced the requirement of the Toleration Act 1688 (1 Will. & Mar. c. 18) (Note: This is the citation in The Statutes of the Realm.) to register such places of worship with the Clerk of the Peace or a settlement's Anglican bishop or archdeacon with registration with the Registrar General. It also gave every clerk of the peace three months after the act's passing to make a return of all such places of worship registered under the old system.

It consisted of three sections:

1. Outline of the changes brought by the act
2. Set a 2s 6d fee for certification
3. Required the Registrar General to create an annual list of the places of worship, which was to be accessible for free at the office of every Superintendent Registrar of Births, Marriages and Deaths in England

== Subsequent developments ==
The whole act was repealed by section 1 of the Places of Worship Registration Act 1855 (18 & 19 Vict. c. 81), which came into force on 30 July 1855.
