= Births and Deaths Registration Act 1953 =

Act of the Parliament of the United Kingdom

Births and Deaths Registration Act 1953 (Note: Section 44(1).)
- Act of Parliament
- Parliament of the United Kingdom
- Long title: An Act to consolidate certain enactments relating to the registration of births and deaths in England and Wales with corrections and improvements made under the Consolidation of Enactments (Procedure) Act 1949.
- Citation: 1 & 2 Eliz. 2. c. 20
- Territorial extent: England and Wales (Note: Section 44(2).)

Dates
- Royal assent: 14 July 1953
- Commencement: 30 September 1953 (Note: Section 44(3).)

Other legislation
- Amends: See § Repealed enactments
- Repeals/revokes: See § Repealed enactments
- Amended by: Registration Service Act 1953; Family Law Reform Act 1969; Criminal Justice Act 1972; Statute Law (Repeals) Act 1974; Children Act 1975; Statute Law (Repeals) Act 1977; Forgery and Counterfeiting Act 1981; Family Law Reform Act 1987; Coroners Act 1988; Children Act 1989; Statute Law (Repeals) Act 1993; Adoption and Children Act 2002; Human Fertilisation and Embryology (Deceased Fathers) Act 2003; Human Fertilisation and Embryology Act 2008; Coroners and Justice Act 2009; Welfare Reform Act 2009
- Relates to: Civil Partnerships, Marriages and Deaths (Registration etc) Act 2019

Status: Amended

Text of statute as originally enacted

Revised text of statute as amended

Text of the Births and Deaths Registration Act 1953 as in force today (including any amendments) within the United Kingdom, from legislation.gov.uk.

The Births and Deaths Registration Act 1953 (1 & 2 Eliz. 2. c. 20) is an act of the Parliament of the United Kingdom that consolidated enactments relating to the registration of births and deaths in England and Wales.

== Provisions ==
=== Repealed enactments ===
Section 43(2) of the act repealed 8 enactments, listed in the second schedule to the act.

Citation	Short title	Extent of repeal
6 & 7 Will. 4. c. 86	Births and Deaths Registration Act 1836	In section fourteen the words from "and the register" to "box" where next occurring; sections seventeen, eighteen, and thirty-two; section thirty-four from the beginning to "supplied" and from "and the certified" onwards; in section thirty-five the words from "and every" to "marriages"; sections thirty-seven, thirty-eight, forty-six, forty-seven and forty-nine; and schedules A, B and D.
7 Will. 4. & 1 Vict. c. 22	Births and Deaths Registration Act 1837	Sections eight, twenty-six, twenty-eight and thirty.
37 & 38 Vict. c. 88	Births and Deaths Registration Act 1874	Sections one to five, seven to sixteen, twenty, twenty-three and thirty; in section thirty-two, the first and third paragraphs; sections thirty-five and thirty-six; in section thirty-seven, the words from the beginning to "effect," paragraph (1) from "and shall" onwards, paragraphs (2), (3), (4) and (5), and in paragraph (6) the words "under the provisions of this section"; sections thirty-eight to forty-four; in section forty-five the words from the beginning to "Act and" and the words from "where" onwards; sections forty-seven to forty-nine; section fifty-two; and the First, Second and Third Schedules.
16 & 17 Geo. 5. c. 48	Births and Deaths Registration Act 1926	Section two; subsection (2) of section three; sections six and seven; subsection (3) of section thirteen from the words "and the" onwards; and the First Schedule.
16 & 17 Geo. 5. c. 59	Coroners (Amendment) Act 1926	Subsection (2) of section twenty-one.
16 & 17 Geo. 5. c. 60	Legitimacy Act 1926	Paragraphs 1, 3 and 5 of the Schedule.
19 & 20 Geo. 5. c. 17	Local Government Act 1929	Section twenty-six.
10 & 11 Geo. 6. c. 12	Births and Deaths Registration Act 1947	The whole act.

== Subsequent developments ==
Section 43(2) of, and schedule 2 to, the act were repealed by section 1 of, and part XI of the schedule to, the Statute Law (Repeals) Act 1974, which came into force on 27 June 1974.

The act has been amended on several occasions. The Family Law Reform Act 1987 and the Children Act 1989 amended provisions relating to the registration of fathers of illegitimate children. The Human Fertilisation and Embryology (Deceased Fathers) Act 2003 and the Human Fertilisation and Embryology Act 2008 amended provisions relating to the registration of parentage in cases involving assisted reproduction. The Adoption and Children Act 2002, the Coroners and Justice Act 2009, and the Welfare Reform Act 2009 made further amendments.
