= George Rose (barrister) =

Sir George Rose (1782–1873) was an English barrister and law reporter, a master in chancery.

== Life ==
Rose, eldest son of James Rose, barge-owner, of Tooley Street, Southwark, was born in London on 1 May 1782. He received a presentation to Westminster School, and became king's scholar in 1797. He was admitted to Trinity College, Cambridge, but did not take a degree. On 5 May 1809 he was called to the bar at the Inner Temple, and commenced attendance in the common-law courts and on the northern circuit. Rose was a witty man, and his first success is attributed to the publicity he attained by the composition while in court, when Lord Eldon was the presiding judge, of the following verse:

Mr. Leach made a speech,
Angry, neat, and long;
Mr. Hart, on the other part,
Was right, but dull and long.
Mr. Parker made that darker
Which was dark enough without;
Mr. Cook quoted his book,
And the Chancellor said I doubt.

In May 1827 he was named a king's counsel, and in the same year became a bencher of his inn, of which he was reader in 1834 and treasurer in 1835. The misfortune of his father's bankruptcy attracted his attention to the bankruptcy branch in chancery, where he obtained a fair practice. He published Reports of Cases in Bankruptcy decided by Lord Eldon, vol. i. 1812, reprinted 1813; vol. ii. 1816, reprinted 1821; this book was continued by J. W. Buck. In 1813 he published An Inquiry into the Nature of Trading as a Scrivener. On 5 December 1831 he was sworn in as one of the four judges of the Court of Review, which had jurisdiction in bankruptcy cases, and on 7 December he was knighted at St. James's Palace.

On some change being made in the court of review, Lord Cottenham gave Rose on 7 Dec. 1840 the lucrative and comparatively easy post of a mastership in chancery, which he held till the masterships were abolished on 1 February 1858; he then retired on his full salary of £2,500 a year.

Rose was the first chairman of the Law Life Insurance Society in 1844, and attended the board meetings until 1859. On 5 June 1834 he was elected a fellow of the Royal Society, and later on became a fellow of the Geographical Society. He was one of the old school of wits. Many of his jokes were of a professional character, and referred to legal proceedings long since obsolete; others, however, related to general matters, and were remarkable for their readiness and originality. To Westminster School he always felt grateful, and with it kept up a friendly connection; he was a steward of the anniversaries in 1827, 1833, and 1848, a constant attendant at the plays, and sometimes aided in the preparation of the prologue and epilogue.

He died at Brighton on 3 December 1873, having married Anne, daughter of Captain Robert Pouncey.
