= General Register Office for England and Wales =

Civil registration office for England and Wales

Births and Deaths Registration Act 1836 (Note: The citation of this act by this short title was authorised by section 1 of, and the first schedule to, the Short Titles Act 1896. Due to the repeal of those provisions it is now authorised by section 19(2) of the Interpretation Act 1978.)
- Act of Parliament
- Parliament of the United Kingdom
- Long title: An Act for registering Births, Deaths, and Marriages in England.
- Citation: 6 & 7 Will. 4. c. 86
- Territorial extent: England and Wales (Note: Long title.)

Dates
- Royal assent: 17 August 1836
- Commencement: 1 March 1837 (Note: Section 1.)
Other legislation
Amends	Parochial Registers Act 1812; Marriage Act 1823
Amended by	Births and Deaths Registration Act 1837; Criminal Statutes Repeal Act 1861; Statute Law Revision Act 1874; Births and Deaths Registration Act 1874; Summary Jurisdiction Act 1884; Statute Law Revision Act 1890; Perjury Act 1911; Marriage Act 1949; Births and Deaths Registration Act 1953; Parochial Registers and Records Measure 1978

Status: Partially repealed

Text of statute as originally enacted

The General Register Office for England and Wales (GRO) is the section of HM Passport Office responsible for the civil registration of births (including stillbirths), adoptions, marriages, civil partnerships and deaths in England and Wales and for those same events outside the UK if they involve a UK citizen and qualify to be registered in various miscellaneous registers. With a small number of historic exceptions involving military personnel, it does not deal with records of such events occurring within the land or territorial waters of Scotland, Northern Ireland or the Republic of Ireland; those entities' registration systems have always been separate from England and Wales.

The GRO was founded in 1836 by the Births and Deaths Registration Act 1836 (6 & 7 Will. 4. c. 86), and civil registration commenced in 1837. Its head is the Registrar General. Probably the most distinguished person associated with the GRO in the 19th century, although he was never its head, was William Farr.

The GRO supplies copies of birth, marriage, civil partnership certificates and death certificates, either online or from one of the local register offices that act on behalf of the GRO.

== History of the GRO ==
=== Establishment ===
Prior to the creation of the General Register Office (GRO) in 1837, there was no national system of civil registration in England and Wales. Baptisms, marriages and burials were recorded in parish registers maintained by Church of England (Anglican) clergy. However, with the great increase in nonconformity and the gradual relaxation of the laws against Catholics and other dissenters from the late 17th century, more and more baptisms, marriages and burials were going unrecorded in the registers of the Anglican Church.

The increasingly poor state of English parish registration led to numerous attempts to shore up the system in the 18th and early 19th centuries. The Clandestine Marriages Act 1753 (26 Geo. 2. c. 33) attempted to prevent "clandestine" marriages by imposing a standard form of entry for marriages, which had to be signed by both parties to the marriage and by witnesses. Additionally, except in the case of Jews and Quakers, legal marriages had to be carried out according to the rites of the Church of England. Sir George Rose's Parochial Registers Act 1812 (52 Geo. 3. c. 146) laid down that all events had to be entered on standard entries in bound volumes. It also declared that the church registers of Nonconformists were not admissible in court as evidence of births, marriages and deaths. Only those maintained by the clergy of the Church of England could be presented in court as legal documents, and this caused considerable hardship for Nonconformists. A number of proposals were presented to Parliament to set up centralised registries for recording vital events in the 1820s but none came to fruition.

Eventually, increasing concern that the poor registration of baptisms, marriages and burials undermined property rights by making it difficult to establish lines of descent, coupled with the complaints of Nonconformists, led to the establishment in 1833 of a parliamentary select committee on parochial registration. This took evidence on the state of the parochial system of registration, and made proposals that were eventually incorporated into the Births and Deaths Registration Act 1836 and the Marriage Act 1836 (6 & 7 Will. 4. c. 85). In addition, the government wanted to survey matters such as infant mortality, fertility and literacy to bring about improvements in health and social welfare. The medical establishment advocated this because a rapidly growing population in the northern industrial towns – caused by the Industrial Revolution – had created severe overcrowding, and the links between poor living conditions and short life expectancy were now known.

The answer was the establishment of a civil registration system. It was hoped that improved registration of vital events would protect property rights through the more accurate recording of lines of descent. Civil registration would also remove the need for Nonconformists to rely upon the Church of England for registration, and provide medical data for research. As a result, in 1836, legislation was passed that ordered the civil registration of births, marriages and deaths in England and Wales. This took effect from 1 July 1837. A General Register Office was set up in London and the office of Registrar General was established.

England and Wales were divided into 619 registration districts (623 from 1851), each under the supervision of a superintendent registrar. The districts were based on the recently introduced poor law unions. The registration districts were further divided into sub-districts (there could be two or more), each under the charge of registrars who were appointed locally.

=== Early history ===
Although the GRO was not specifically established to undertake statistical research, the early Registrars General, Thomas Henry Lister (1836–42) and George Graham (1842–79), built up a Statistical Department to compile medical, public health and actuarial statistics. Much of this work was undertaken in the early to mid-Victorian period by William Farr, the GRO's Superintendent of Statistics. Under these men the Annual reports of the Registrar General became a vehicle for administrative and social reform. In 1840 the GRO also took over responsibility for the decennial census of England and Wales.

In 1871, the GRO came under the supervision of the Local Government Board. During the First World War the GRO was responsible for co-ordinating National Registration, which underpinned recruitment to the armed forces, the movement of workers into the munitions industries, and rationing. National Registration was not, however, continued after the war and the GRO was absorbed into the Ministry of Health in 1919.

=== Departmental responsibility ===
In 1970 the GRO became part of the newly created Office of Population Censuses and Surveys (OPCS), with the Registrar General in overall charge. Until then it had had several statistical functions, including the conduct of population censuses and the production of annual population estimates; all these were moved elsewhere within the new organisation. The GRO then became a division within OPCS, headed by a Deputy Registrar General. Then in 1996 the OPCS, and therefore the GRO, became part of the newly created Office for National Statistics, and the office of Registrar General was merged with that of Head of the Government Statistical Service.

==== Becoming part of the Home Office ====
On 1 April 2008, the General Register Office for England and Wales (GRO) became a subsidiary of the Identity and Passport Service (IPS), then an executive agency of the Home Office. The decision to make the transfer of GRO to IPS was finalised following the outcome of the Comprehensive Spending Review in 2007. The move followed changes to make Office for National Statistics (ONS) more independent of the British Government, which included relinquishing the registration role.

In 2013, IPS was renamed HM Passport Office, while remaining an agency of the Home Office.

=== Location ===
From its beginnings in 1836, the General Register Office was based within the North Wing of Somerset House in London. There it remained until 1970 when it moved within London to St Catherine's House on Kingsway. For a short time after the move the death records were stored at Alexandra House (on the opposite side of Kingsway), until room was found for all the records at St Catherine's House. In 1997 the GRO staff were moved to Southport, Merseyside while public access to the records and indexes was made available at a new Family Records Centre (FRC) in Clerkenwell. This facility was jointly operated by the National Archives so that public access to census returns was also available at the same location. The FRC was closed in 2008, in response to steadily decreasing visitor numbers caused by the increased online availability of the records.

The GRO is now located at Smedley Hydro in Southport, a former hydropathic hotel that has been converted into offices for the GRO and the NHS Information Centre, formerly the NHS Central Register.

== The GRO registration process ==
=== Births ===
In the early days of the system, it was up to each local registrar to find out what births had taken place in his sub-district, often employing help to do so. Mark Herber gives an estimate that in some parts of England up to 15% of births between 1837 and 1875 were not registered, although some perceived omissions were due to missing indexes, wrongly indexed entries and spelling errors. As a result of the Births and Deaths Registration Act 1874 (37 & 38 Vict. c. 38), from 1875 the onus was on parents to inform the registrar when they had a child, and penalties were imposed on those who failed to register. Births had to be registered within 42 days at the district or sub-district office, usually by the mother or father, or for a fee the registrar could visit the home.

Until 1926, there were no registrations at all of stillborn children. For illegitimate children, the original 1836 legislation provided that "it shall not be necessary to register the name of any father of a bastard child". From 1850, instructions to registrars were clarified to state that, "No putative father is allowed to sign an entry in the character of 'Father'." However, the law was changed again in 1875 to allow a father of an illegitimate child to record his name on his child's birth certificate if he attended the register office with the mother. In 1953 a child's father could also be recorded on the birth certificate, if not married to the mother, without being physically present to sign the register.

=== Marriages ===
Clergy of the established Church of England are registrars for marriage. In each parish church two identical registers of marriages are kept and when they are complete, one is sent to the superintendent registrar. In the meantime, every three months it is required that a return certified by a clergy person detailing the marriages that had taken place, or else that no marriages had taken place, in the preceding three months, be submitted directly to the superintendent registrar.

The Marriage Act 1836 (6 & 7 Will. 4. c. 85) also permitted marriages by licence to take place in approved churches, chapels and nonconformist meeting houses, other than those of the Church of England. Marriages were only legally binding if they were notified to the superintendent registrar by the officiating minister so in effect, this required the presence of a local registration officer as the authorising person. When a nonconformist minister or other religious official, such as a rabbi, performed the ceremony it was necessary for the local registrar or his assistant to be present so that the marriage was legal. This legislation was not repealed until 1898, after which date, nonconformist ministers and other religious leaders could take on the role of notifying official, if so appointed, and on the condition that their premises were licensed for the solemnising of marriage. The civil authorities, i.e. the local registrar, could also perform marriage by certificate in a register office. Changes in marriage laws since 1836 have also affected how marriages are registered, for example, civil partnerships for same-sex couples were introduced by the British Government in 2004 and the GRO records these ceremonies through its civil registration system.

=== Deaths ===
A death was to be registered by someone who had been present at the death or during the final illness. If that was not possible, it could be registered by the owner of the building where the person died, or if the dead person was the owner, by some other occupier of the building. There were more complicated arrangements for eventualities such as unidentified bodies being found, and cases where there was a coroner's inquest. A death was supposed to be registered within eight days.

Since there was not necessarily a unique person clearly responsible for registering a death, in order to make sure deaths were registered, clergymen were made responsible for checking the death certificate before performing any funeral or burial service. However, they were given some leeway in case the death had not yet been registered, and could go ahead with the service provided they notified the registrar themselves within seven days. If they failed to do so they were liable for a £10 fine. This was inadequate to guarantee all deaths were registered, since in principle a body could be buried without a religious service, and those who had not been baptised (mostly young children) did not qualify for Christian burial.

Between 1858 and 1874, a certificate should state whether the death had been certified by a doctor or not. From 1875 the cause of death had to be certified by a doctor before the certificate could be issued. A death would normally be registered in the district in which it occurred. Once a death had been registered, the registrar would normally issue a Certificate for Burial or Cremation, unless the death were being investigated by the coroner or there were an inquest.

The Births and Deaths Registration Act 1874 (37 & 38 Vict. c. 38) tried to ensure all deaths were registered, by placing a duty on the persons who were supposed to register the death to do so. No specific penalty was imposed if they failed to do so, but if the registrar became aware of any deaths that had not been registered within the past year, then the registrar had a duty, and was empowered, to summon the negligent parties to the register office to get it registered. If the death had occurred more than a year previously, it was not to be registered late without special permission.

A different registration system operates in other parts of the United Kingdom.

== The GRO indexes ==
Every three months, at the end of March, June, September and December, the superintendent registrars send a copy of each entry of birth, marriage and death registered by their office in that quarter, to the Registrar General in London. From these returns the General Register Office produces indexes to its records, which are open to public inspection, and the indexes can be used to order birth, marriage and death certificates.

With the exception of some extra details recorded on death certificates since 1969, the information given on certificates of birth, marriage and death has not changed since 1837, but the amount of information given in the index volumes has increased from time to time. Until 1983, the copies received by the Registrar General were bound into volumes, and three separate alphabetical indexes were prepared on a quarterly basis. The number of volumes depends on the number of people registered in each quarter. Thus there might be 10 volumes for some quarters: Vol.1 A-B, Vol.2 C-D, Vol.3 E-G and so on. From their inception, the alphabetical indexes give the surname, the forenames if registered, the registration district and the volume and the page on which the entry may be found. These details enable the appropriate record to be located. Before 1866, the indexes were written by hand on heavy parchment, though some have been replaced by printed copies. From 1984, the indexes are in annual instead of quarterly volumes. The indexes from 1984 give the month of registration as the first and second digits in the document reference number, and the next two digits give the year. Thus the reference number 0485 9 2128 refers to an event registered in April 1985. From 1860 the GRO death index specifies an age of death and from 1911 the birth index also specifies the maiden name of a child's mother.

The GRO indexes are a major tool for persons tracing their family history, as well as those needing duplicate copies of their own birth or marriage certificates. The indexes can be viewed on microfiche at the National Archives, major libraries, county record officers, and LDS Family History Centres, and can also be searched on a pay-per-view basis on several family history websites. A free, searchable, index can be consulted online via the official General Register Office website after signing up or via the FreeBMD website. FreeBMD is an ongoing project to transcribe the whole GRO Index.

Other parts of the United Kingdom have their own indexing system.

=== Other registers and indexes ===
In addition to the registers already mentioned, the GRO has charge of a number of other records in its Overseas Section. These indexes can be searched online at pay-per-view family history websites and at the National Archives. They generally contain similar information to the main GRO indexes and registers. The Regimental Registers, Chaplains' Returns, Consular Returns, Army Births, Marriages and Deaths and the War Deaths are some of the most significant. The civil registration records that pertain to British people in India and countries in the Far East, formerly part of the British Empire, are found in the Oriental and India Office Collections of the British Library.

== GRO certificates and their content ==
Using the information obtained from the GRO Index it is possible to obtain a certificate online from the certificate ordering service. The GRO currently charge £12.50 for each certificate of birth, marriage or death, although a more expensive premium service is available for those who need copies of documents quickly. GRO certificates are used as a source by family historians to trace ancestry as well as being used for official purposes like applying for a passport.

Birth certificates issued by the GRO are printed on a red form and contain the following information:

- the registration district and sub-district;
- the entry number;
- the name of the child (if already bestowed);
- the date and place of birth;
- the sex;
- the name of the father;
- the name and maiden name of the mother;
- and the profession or occupation of the father;
- the name, address and position of the informant (e.g. mother)
- the date of registration and the name of the registrar
- a name given after registration e.g. if they were given a different name after baptism if within 12 months of the birth being registered.

Marriage certificates issued by the GRO are printed on a green form and give the following information:

- the date and place of solemnisation of the marriage;
- the names, addresses and condition (formerly bachelor or widower, now single, previous marriage dissolved etc) of both parties to the marriage;
- the rank or profession of both their parents (since May 2021, previously just fathers);
- the name of at least two witnesses and the officiating minister or registrar;
- whether the marriage was by banns, licence or registrar's certificate.

Death certificates issues by the GRO are printed on a black and purple form and give the following information:

- the registration district and sub-district
- the entry number;
- name of the deceased, their supposed age at death and occupation
- the cause of death
- date and place of death
- the informant and their relationship to the deceased
- the name of the registrar;
- from 1969 death certificates also record the date and place of birth of the deceased and, if applicable, the maiden name of a woman.

Certificates issued in other parts of the United Kingdom contain different or additional information and have a different format.

Certificates issued by the GRO clearly state that they are certified copies of the register entries, that they are not evidence of a person's identity, and that there are criminal offences relating the unlawful amendment or falsification of a certificate, or using or possessing a false certificate. Certificates contain the seal of the General Register Office and show an abridged version of the Royal Coat of Arms.

== Digitisation and Indexing (D&I) Project ==
A project, called DoVE (Digitisation of Vital Events), to digitise the GRO's records of birth, marriage and death was initiated in 2005. Implementation of the project was outsourced to Siemens IT Solutions and Services in a three-year contract which expired at the end of July 2008. The process of scanning, digitising and indexing suffered severe delays, with only (roughly) half the records delivered by the end of the contract period. By mutual agreement between the IPS and Siemens, the contract was not extended. Digitisation of birth records up to 1934 and death records up to 1957 had been completed when the contract ended.

The records that have been digitised – over 130 million of them – form part of a system (called EAGLE, for "Electronic Access to GRO Legacy Events") which is used within the GRO to fulfil requests for certificates from the general public. A different system, known as MAGPIE ("MultiAccess to GRO Public Index of Events"), was intended to make the indexes available to the public via a website, but this will not now be implemented. Instead, following a lengthy review of options, a new project, called the Digitisation and Indexing (D&I) Project, was initiated.

The D&I Project was planned to: complete the digitisation of birth, marriage and death records; create an online index to those records; and improve the certificate ordering process. In September 2010 this project was suspended pending the outcome of the latest UK Government Comprehensive Spending Review. The IPS expected to reach a decision on the future of the digitisation project during financial year 2011/12, but in August 2012 it was announced that "there are no current plans to resume this work". However, the IPS says it "will continue to monitor the scope for future opportunities to digitise all birth, death and marriage records".

== Registrars General ==
- Thomas Henry Lister, 1836–1842
- George Graham, 1842–1880
- Brydges Powell Henniker, 1880–1900
- Reginald MacLeod, 1900–1902
- William Cospatrick Dunbar, 1902–1909
- Bernard Mallet, 1909–1920
- Sylvanus Percival Vivian, 1920–1945
- George Cecil North, 1945–1958
- Edward Michael Tyndall Firth, 1958–1963
- Michael Reed, 1963–1974
- George Paine, 1974–1978
- Arthur Roger Thatcher, 1978–1986
- Gillian Theresa Banks, 1986–1990
- Peter John Wormald, 1990–1996
- David "Tim" Holt, 1996–2000
- Isobel Mary Macdonald-Davies, 2000
- Leonard Warren Cook, 2000–2005
- Karen Hope Dunnell, 2005–2008
- James Douglas Ellis Hall, 2008–2010
- Sarah Oonagh Rapson, 2010–2014
- Paul William Pugh, 2014–2015
- Mark Thomson, 2015–2020 (also Director General of HM Passport Office, and on the executive management board of the Home Office)
- Myrtle Lloyd, 2020
- Abi Tierney 2020–2023
- Tom Grieg 2024–

== See also ==
- General Register Office
- General Register Office for Northern Ireland
- General Register Office for Scotland
- HM Land Registry
